= Parashah =

Section of a biblical book in the Masoretic Text

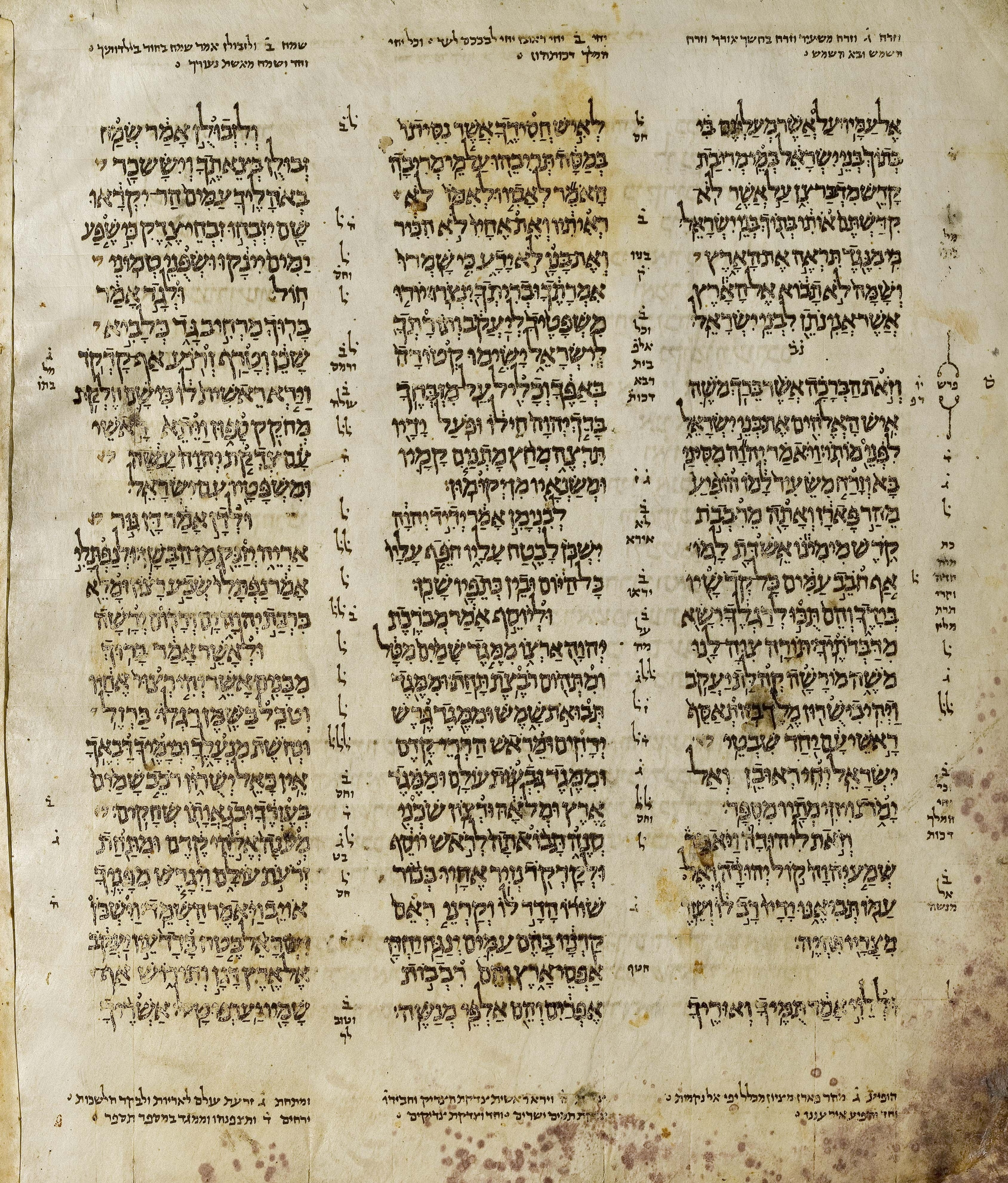
A page from the Aleppo Codex, Deuteronomy 32:50–33:29. Parashah breaks visible on this page are as follows: {P} 33:1–6 (right column blank line 8th from top) {S} 33:7 (right column indentation line 23) {P} 33:8–11 (right column blank line 2nd from bottom) {S} 33:12 (middle column 1st indentation) {S} 33:13–17 (middle column 2nd indentation) {S} 33:18–19 (left column indentation at top) {S} 33:20–21 (left column space in middle of 6th line) {S} 33:22 (left column 13th line indentation) {S} 33:24–39 (left column 17th line indentation).

The term parashah (Hebrew: פָּרָשָׁה Pārāšâ, "portion", Tiberian /pɔrɔˈʃɔ/, Sephardi /paraˈʃa/, plural: parshiot, also called parsha) formally means a section of a biblical book in the Masoretic Text of the Tanakh (Hebrew Bible). In common usage today the word often refers to the weekly Torah portion (a shortened form of Parashat HaShavua). This article deals with the first, formal meaning of the word. In the Masoretic Text, parashah sections are designated by various types of spacing between them, as found in Torah scrolls, scrolls of the books of Nevi'im (Prophets) or Ketuvim (Writings) (especially the Megillot), masoretic codices from the Middle Ages and printed editions of the Masoretic Text.

The division of the text into parshiot for the biblical books is independent of chapter and verse numbers, which are not part of the masoretic tradition. Parshiot are not numbered, but some have special names.

The division of parshiot found in the modern-day Torah scrolls of all Jewish communities is based upon the systematic list provided by Maimonides in Mishneh Torah, Laws of Tefillin, Mezuzah and Torah Scrolls, chapter 8. Scholars mostly (see footnote) believe that Maimonides based his division of the parshiot of the Torah on the Aleppo Codex. The division of parshiot for the books of Nevi'im and Ketuvim was never completely standardized in printed Hebrew bibles and handwritten scrolls, though important attempts were made to document it and create fixed rules.

Incorrect division of the text into parshiot, either by indicating a parashah in the wrong place or by using the wrong spacing technique, halakhically invalidates a Torah scroll according to Maimonides.

== Purpose ==
A parashah break creates a textual pause, roughly analogous to a modern paragraph break. Such a pause usually has one of the following purposes:

1. In most cases, a new parashah begins where a new topic or a new thought is clearly indicated in the biblical text.
2. In many places, however, the parashah divisions are used even in places where it is clear that no new topic begins, in order to highlight a special verse by creating a textual pause before it or after it (or both).
3. A special example of #2 is for lists: The individual elements in many biblical lists are separated by parashah spacing of one type or another.

To decide exactly where a new topic or thought begins within a biblical text involves a degree of subjectivity on the part of the reader. This subjective element may help explain differences amongst the various masoretic codices in some details of the section divisions (though their degree of conformity is high). It may also explain why certain verses which might seem like introductions to a new topic lack a section division, or why such divisions sometimes appear in places where no new topic seems indicated. For this reason, the parashah divisions may at times contribute to biblical exegesis.

== History ==
Parshiot appear in manuscripts as early as the Dead Sea Scrolls, in which the division is generally similar to that found in the masoretic text. The idea of spacing between portions, including the idea of "open" and "closed" portions, is mentioned in early midrashic literature and in the Talmud. Early masoretic lists detailing the Babylonian tradition include systematic and detailed discussion of exactly where portions begin and which type they are.

As a group, Tiberian Masoretic codices share similar but not identical parashah divisions throughout the Bible. Unlike the Babylonian mesorah, however, Tiberian masoretic notes never mention the parashah divisions or attempt to systematize them. This is related to the fact that the Babylonian lists are independent compositions, while the Tiberian notes are in the margins of the biblical text itself, which shows the parshiot in a highly visible way.

In the centuries following the Tiberian Masoretic Text, there were ever-increasing efforts to document and standardize the details of the parashah divisions, especially for the Torah, and even for Nevi'im and Ketuvim as time went on.

== Spacing techniques ==
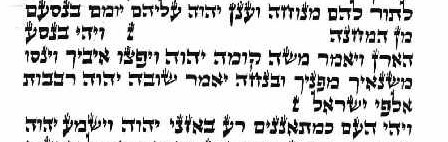
Illustration of a closed section followed by an open section in a modern Torah scroll (closed at Numbers 10:35 and open at 11:1). Note the rare occurrence of "inverted Nun" at these two points.

In most modern Torah scrolls and Jewish editions of the Bible, there are two types of parshiot, an "open portion" (parashah petuhah) and a "closed portion" (parashah setumah). An "open portion" is roughly similar to a modern paragraph: The text of the previous portion ends before the end of the column (leaving a space at the end of the line), and the new "open" portion starts at the beginning of the next line (but with no indentation). A "closed portion", on the other hand, leaves a space in the middle of the line of text, where the previous portion ends before the space, and the next portion starts after it, towards the end of the line of text.

In some manuscripts and in many printed editions, an "open portion" (petuhah) is abbreviated with the Hebrew letter "פ" (peh), and a "closed portion" (setumah) with the Hebrew letter "ס" (samekh), often in place of the visual gap in the line. Rough English equivalents are "P" and "S" respectively.

In masoretic codices and in medieval scrolls, these two spacing techniques allowed for a larger range of options:

- An "open portion" always started at the beginning of a new line. This could happen the way described above, but also by leaving a blank line between the two portions, thus allowing the previous portion to sometimes entirely fill its last line of text.
- A "closed portion" never began at the beginning of a line. This could happen as in modern scrolls (a space in the middle of a line), but also by the previous portion ending before the end of the line, and the new portion beginning on the next line after an indentation.

Open portions often seem to reflect the beginning of a new topic or a major subdivision within a biblical book, while closed portions seem to reflect smaller units or minor subdivisions.

Most printed Hebrew bibles today represent the parshiot using the more limited techniques found in typical modern Torah scrolls: A space in the middle of a line for a closed portion, and beginning at the start of the next line for an open portion (not a blank line). A notable exception is The Jerusalem Crown (The Bible of the Hebrew University of Jerusalem, 2000), whose typography and layout is fashioned after the Aleppo Codex, and follows the medieval spacing techniques for parashah divisions by leaving an empty line for {P} and starts {S} on a new line with an indentation.

Medieval Ashkenazic sources beginning with the Mahzor Vitry also refer to a third spacing technique called a parashah sedurah. This involved starting a new parashah at the same point in the line where the previous parashah ended on the line above.

== Halakhic significance ==
=== Validity of scrolls ===
According to the ruling of Maimonides, any error regarding a parashah completely invalidates a Torah scroll. This includes a parashah in the wrong place, of the wrong type, or a missing parashah.

However, there is also a responsum by Maimonides in which he ruled that one may recite a blessing over reading from an invalid scroll, based on the reasoning that the commandment is in the reading itself, not in the text being read from.

Maimonides' strict ruling that any error in the parshiot completely invalidates a Torah scroll led to a major halakhic debate that continues to this day. Among those who ruled against Maimonides' stricture in practice were his son, Abraham Maimonides, Menachem Meiri, Moshe Chalava, Judah Minz, and Ovadia Yosef.

All of the above authorities rule that a scroll containing parshiot based on alternative scribal traditions that disagree with Maimonides' list of parshiot is nevertheless a valid scroll. However, even according to the lenient opinion, a blatant error with no source in any scribal tradition invalidates a Torah scroll.

=== Rules and customs for public reading ===
One basic halakhic rule for public reading of the Torah is that no fewer than three verses at a time be read. As a corollary to this, there is a specific rule regarding parshiot: One may not leave off reading less than three verses before the end of a parashah, nor may one end off reading by starting a new parashah but leaving off less than three verses from its beginning.

When a Torah portion is read in public from a scroll as part of the synagogue service, it is divided into smaller sections among several people (for instance, 3 short sections on weekdays or 7 on the Sabbath). The points at which the portion is subdivided often take the parshiot into account, but there is no hard and fast rule for this.

The selections from Nevi'im that are read as haftarot are based on custom. At times, some of these customs choose the exact beginning or end of a haftarah because it coincides with a parashah division.

== Torah ==
Due to the influence of Maimonides, parashah divisions in the Torah have become highly standardized, and there is close to exact agreement among Torah scrolls, printed Jewish bibles, and similar online texts. The following list thus presents the parashah divisions as found in (a) modern Torah scrolls, (b) Maimonides' Mishneh Torah, and (c) the Aleppo Codex (based on several witnesses besides Maimonides to the parshiot in its missing parts). Rare inconsistencies between these three sources are explained in footnotes.

The list is constructed as follows:

- Only breaks between two sections are listed: Any open or closed parashah break, {P} or {S}, must always appear between two biblical sections. The symbols {P} and {S} always indicate the status of the following section. In Genesis, for instance, "{S} 5:32–6:4 {P}" indicates a closed section (setumah) because it begins with {S}. Therefore, no section break is indicated before the first portion of a biblical book, or after its last portion.
- The five books of the Torah have been broken down into their weekly Torah readings for convenience. The weekly Torah readings always begin at a parashah break, with the single exception of Vayechi (Genesis 47:28). The division into weekly readings is a prominent feature of the Tiberian masoretic codices along with the division into smaller parshiot, and they are indicated with a special flourish in the margin parallel to the line in which each one begins.
- Special series of parshiot used for special types of text (such as chronologies, lists, step-by-step sequences, repeating formulas) are indicated.
- When a parashah ignores a chapter break, this is indicated for convenience by spelling out the exact verses from each chapter found in that parashah; for instance: {P} 32:4–33; 33:1–17 {S}. This system allows for immediate calculation of the number verses in the parashah, and also facilitates easier comparison between the parshiot and the chapter divisions.
- Variations found in alternative masoretic traditions (such as in the Leningrad Codex) are provided separately at the end of each book.
- Unusual data (such as an unusually lengthy parashah) is underlined to draw special attention, followed by a parenthetical note identifying the contents of the parashah at hand.
- The first words of a parashah are sometimes provided in Hebrew for clarity, especially for parshiot that appear within a verse. A prominent example is for the Ten Commandments. The titles of prominent parshiot mentioned in rabbinic literature are also sometimes given.
- The verse numbering in this list is according to the system commonly found in most Hebrew editions. The numbers in translations (and even in some Hebrew editions such as BHS) may differ slightly.

Symbols:

- {P} = parashah **p**etuhah ("open portion"), resembles a new **p**aragraph with the end of the line open
- {S} = parashah **s**etumah ("closed portion"), typically represented as a blank **s**pace in the middle of a line with the space completely enclosed by the text
- {-} = no parashah break indicated
- {SONG} = Special format for songs; details of the special layout will be described in separate sections.

=== Genesis ===
A page of the Aleppo Codex was photographed in 1887 by William Wickes, containing Genesis 26:35 (החתי) to 27:30 (ויהי אך). It shows a single closed parashah break {S} at 27:1 (ויהי כי זקן יצחק); that parashah is in bold within the list below for Parashat Toledot.

- Parashat Bereshit (Genesis 1:1–6:8):
  - Seven days:1:1–5 {P} 1:6–8 {P} 1:9–13 {P} 1:14–19 {P} 1:20–23 {P} 1:24–31 {P} 2:1–3
  - {P} 2:4–2:25; 3:1–3:15 {S} 3:16 {S} 3:17–21 {P} 3:22–24 {S} 4:1–26
  - From Adam to Noah: {S} 5:1–5 {S} 5:6–8 {S} 5:9–11 {S} 5:12–14 {S} 5:15–17 {S} 5:18–20 {S} 5:21–24 {S} 5:25–27 {S} 5:28–31 {S} 5:32; 6:1–4
  - {P} 6:5–8
- Parashat Noach (Genesis 6:9–11:32):
  - {P} 6:9–12 {S} 6:13–22; 7:1–24; 8:1–14 {S} 8:15–22; 9:1–7 {S} 9:8–17 {P} 9:18–29 {P} 10:1–14 {S} 10:15–20 {S} 10:21–32 {P} 11:1–9
  - From Noah to Abraham: {P} 11:10–11 {S} 11:12–13 {S} 11:14–15 {S} 11:16–17 {S} 11:18–19 {S} 11:20–21 {S} 11:22–23 {S} 11:24–25 {S} 11:26–32
- Parashat Lekh Lekha (Genesis 12:1–17:27):
  - {P} 12:1–9 {P} 12:10–20;13:1–18 {P} 14:1–24 {S} 15:1–21 {S} 16:1–16 {S} 17:1–14 {S} 17:15–27
- Parashat Vayera (Genesis 18:1–22:24):
  - {P} 18:1–33; 19:1–38 {S} 20:1–18 {S} 21:1–21 {P} 21:22–34 {P} 22:1–19 {P} 22:20–24
- Parashat Chayyei Sarah (Genesis 23:1–25:18):
  - {P} 23:1–20 {S} 24:1–67 (Eliezer and Rebeccah) {P} 25:1–11 {P} 25:12–18
- Parashat Toledot (Genesis 25:19–28:9):
  - {P} 25:19–34 {P} 26:1–33 {S} 26:34–35 **{S}** 27:1–46; 28:1–9 (blessings of Isaac & Jacob; see image)
- Parashat Vayetzei (Genesis 28:10–32:3):
  - {S} 28:10–22; 29:1–35; 30:1–43; 31:1–55; 32:1–3 (Jacob in Haran)
- Parashat Vayishlach (Genesis 32:4–36:43):
  - {P} 32:4–33; 33:1–17 {S} 33:18–20 {S} 34:1–31 {P} 35:1–8 {P} 35:9–22a {P} 35:22b–29 {P} 36:1–19 {S} 36:20–30 {P} 36:31-43
- Parashat Vayeshev (Genesis 37–40):
  - {P} 37:1–36 {P} 38:1–30 {S} 39:1–23 {P} 40:1–23
- Parashat Miketz (Genesis 41:1–44:17):
  - {P} 41:1–57; 42:1–38; 43:1–34; 44:1–17 (Joseph in Egypt)
- Parashat Vayigash (Genesis 44:18–47:27) and Parashat Vayechi (Genesis 47:28–50:26):
  - {S} 44:18–34; 45:1–28; 46:1–7 (Reconciliation) {S} 46:8–27 {S} 46:28–34; 47:1–31 {P} 48:1–22
  - Jacob's blessings: {P} 49:1–4 {P} 49:5–7 {P} 49:8–12 {P} 49:13 {P} 49:14–15 {S} 49:16–18 {S} 49:19 {S} 49:20 {S} 49:21 {S} 49:22–26 {P} 49:27–33; 50:1–26

Total: Petuhot (Open): 43, Setumot (Closed): 48, Combined: 91.

Variants:

- Leningrad Codex: {P} 5:1 {S} 5:3 {P} 5:21 {P} 5:25 {P} 5:28 {S} 7:1 {S} 12:1 {S} 23:1 {S} 25:12 {S} 26:1 {S} 40:1 {P} 46:28 {S} 49:8 {S} 49:14 {-} 49:19

=== Exodus ===
- Parashat Shemot (Exodus 1:1–6:1):
  - 1:1–7 {P} 1:8–22 {P} 2:1–22 {P} 2:23–25 {S} 3:1–22; 4:1–17 {P} 4:18–26 {P} 4:27–31; 5:1–23; 6:1
- Parashat Va'era (Exodus 6:2–9:35):
  - {S} 6:2–9 {P} 6:10–12 {P} 6:13 {S} 6:14–28 {S} 6:29–30 {P} 7:1–7 {P} 7:8–13 {S} 7:14–18 {S} 7:19–25 {P} 7:26–29;8:1–11 {S} 8:12–15 {S} 8:16–28 {P} 9:1–7 {P} 9:8–12 {S} 9:13–21 {P} 9:22–35
- Parashat Bo (Exodus 10:1–13:16):
  - {P} 10:1–11 {S} 10:12–20 {P} 10:21–29 {P} 11:1–3 {S} 11:4–8 {S} 11:9–10 {S} 12:1–20 {P} 12:21–28 {S} 12:29–36 {P} 12:37–42 {P} 12:43–50 {S} 12:51 {P} 13:1–10 {P} 13:11–16
- Parashat Beshallach (Exodus 13:17–17:16):
  - {S} 13:17–22 {P} 14:1–14 {P} 14:15–25 {P} 14:26–31
  - {P} **Song of the Sea: {SONG} 15:1–19 {SONG}**
  - {P} 15:20–26 {S} 15:27;16:1–3 {S} 16:4–10 {P} 16:11–27 {S} 16:28–36 {P} 17:1–7 {P} 17:8–13 {P} 17:14–16
- Parashat Yitro (Exodus 18:1–20:23):
  - {P} 18:1–27 {P} 19:1–24
  - Ten Commandments: {S} 20:1 וידבר {S} 20:2–5 אנכי {S} 20:6 לא תשא {P} 20:7–10 זכור {S} 20:11 כבד {S} 20:12a לא תרצח {S} 20:12b לא תנאף {S} 20:12c לא תגנב {S} 20:12d לא תענה {S} 20:13a לא תחמד בית רעך {S} 20:13b לא תחמד אשת רעך
  - {P} 20:14–17 {S} 20:18–22
- Parashat Mishpatim (Exodus 21:1–24:18):
  - Laws: {P} 21:1–6 {S} 21:7–11 {S} 21:12–13 {S} 21:14 {S} 21:15 {S} 21:16 {S} 21:17 {S} 21:18–19 {S} 21:20–21 {S} 21:22–25 {S} 21:26–27 {P} 21:28–32 {S} 21:33–34 {S} 21:35–36 {S} 21:37;22:1–3 {S} 22:4 {S} 22:5 {S} 22:6–8 {S} 22:9–12 {S} 22:13–14 {S} 22:15–16 {S} 22:17–18 {S} 22:19–23 {P} 22:24–26 {S} 22:27–30 {S} 23:1–3 {S} 23:4 {S} 23:5 {S} 23:6–19
  - {P} 23:20–25 {S} 23:26–33 {P} 24:1–11 {S} 24:12–18
- Parashat Terumah (Exodus 25:1–27:19):
  - {P} 25:1–9 {S} 25;10–22 {P} 25:23–30 {P} 25:31–40 {S} 26:1–14 {P} 26:15–30 {S} 26:31–37 {S} 27:1–8 {S} 27:9–19
- Parashat Tetzaveh (Exodus 27:20–30:10):
  - {S} 27:20–21 {S} 28:1–5 {P} 28:6–12 {S} 28:13–14 {S} 28:15–30 {S} 28:31–35 {S} 28:36–43 {S} 29:1–37 {S} 29:38–46 {P} 30:1–10
- Parashat Ki Tissa (Exodus 30:11–34:35):
  - {P} 30:11–16 {P} 30:17–21 {P} 30:22–33 {S} 30:34–38 {S} 31:1–11 {P} 31:12–17 {S} 31:18;32:1–6 {P} 32:7–14 {P} 32:15–35 {S} 33:1–11 {P} 33:12–16 {P} 33:17–23 {S/P} 34:1–26 {P} 34:27–35
- Parashat Vayakhel (Exodus 35:1–38:20):
  - {S} 35:1–3 {P} 35:4–29 {P} 35:30–35; 36:1–7 {S} 36:8–13 {P} 36:14–19 {S} 36:20–38 {P} 37:1–9 {P} 37:10–16 {P} 37:17–24 {P} 37:25–29 {S} 38:1–7 {S} 38:8 {S} 38:9–20
- Parashat Pekudei (Exodus 38:21–40:38):
  - {S} 38:21–23 {S} 38:24–31; 39:1 {P} 39:2–5 {S} 39:6–7 {P} 39:8–21 {P} 39:22–26 {S} 39:27–29 {S} 39:30–31 {S} 39:32 {P} 39:33–43 {P} 40:1–16 {S} 40:17–19 {S} 40:20–21 {S} 40:22–23 {S} 40:24–25 {S} 40:26–27 {S} 40:28–29 {S} 40:30–32 {S} 40:33 {P} 40:34–38

Variants:

- Leningrad Codex: {S} 2:1 {P} 6:29 {P} 7:14 {P} 10:12 {P} 12:1 {S} 13:11 {S} 16:6 {P} 20:18 {-} 21:16 {S} 21:27 {S} 22:18 {S} 23:2 {S} 23:20 {-} 23:26 {P} 26:7 {S} 33:12 {S} 34:1 {S} 36:14 {P} 38:1 {-} 39:6 {-} 39:22 {P} 40:28

=== Leviticus ===
- Parashat Vayikra (Leviticus 1:1–5:26):
  - 1:1–9 {S} 1:10–13 {P} 1:14–17 {S} 2:1–3 {S} 2:4 {S} 2:5–6 {S} 2:7–13 {S} 2:14–16 {P} 3:1–5 {P} 3:6–11 {P} 3:12–17 {P} 4:1–12 {P} 4:13–21 {P} 4:22–26 {P} 4:27–31 {P} 4:32–35 {P} 5:1–10 {S} 5:11–13 {S} 5:14–16 {P} 5:17–19 {P} 5:20–26
- Parashat Tzav (Leviticus 6:1–8:36):
  - {P} 6:1–6 {S} 6:7–11 {P} 6:12–16 {P} 6:17–23 {P} 7:1–10 {P} 7:11–21 {P/-} 7:22–27 {P/-} 7:28–38 {P} 8:1–36
- Parashat Shemini (Leviticus 9:1–11:47):
  - {S} 9:1–24; 10:1–7 {P} 10:8–11 {P} 10:12–20 {P} 11:1–28 {S} 11:29–38 {S} 11:39–47
- Parashat Tazria (Leviticus 12:1–13:59):
  - {P} 12:1–8 {P} 13:1–8 {P} 13:9–17 {P} 13:18–23 {S} 13:24–28 {P} 13:29–37 {S} 13:38–39 {S} 13:40–46 {S} 13:47–59
- Parashat Metzora (Leviticus 14:1–15:33):
  - {P} 14:1–20 {S} 14:21–32 {P} 14:33–57 {P} 15:1–15 {S} 15:16–18 {P} 15:19–24 {S} 15:25–33
- Parashat Acharei Mot (Leviticus 16:1–18:30):
  - {P} 16:1–34 {P} 17:1–16 {P} 18:1–5
  - Forbidden relations: {S} 18:6 {S} 18:7 {S} 18:8 {S} 18:9 {S} 18:10 {S} 18:11 {S} 18:12 {S} 18:13 {S} 18:14 {S} 18:15 {S} 18:16 {S} 18:17–30
- Parashat Kedoshim (Leviticus 19:1–20:27):
  - {P} 19:1–22 {P} 19:23–32 {S} 19:33–37 {P} 20:1–27
- Parashat Emor (Leviticus 21:1–24:23):
  - {P} 21:1–9 {S} 21:10–15 {S} 21:16–24 {P} 22:1–16 {P} 22:17–25 {S} 22:26–33 {P} 23:1–3 {P} 23:4–8 {P} 23:9–14 {S} 23:15–22 {P} 23:23–25 {S} 23:26–32 {P} 23:33–44 {P} 24:1–4 {P} 24:5–9 {S} 24:10–12 {P} 24:13–23
- Parashat Behar (Leviticus 25:1–26:2):
  - {P} 25:1–7 {S} 25:8–24 {S} 25:25–28 {S} 25:29–34 {S} 25:35–38 {S} 25:39–46 {S} 25:47–26:2
- Parashat Bechukotai (Leviticus 26:3–27:34):
  - {P} 26:3–13 {P} 26:14–26 {S} 26:27–46 {P} 27:1–8 {S} 27:9–34

Variants:

- Leningrad Codex: {P} 7:22 {P} 7:28 {S} 11:21 {S} 15:1 {P} 15:17 {-} 15:18 {P} 15:25 {S} 17:13 {P} 19:20 {P} 19:33 {P} 21:16 {S} 22:14 {P} 22:26 {S} 23:23 {-} 25:29 {S} 26:3 {S} 26:18 {S} 27:26

=== Numbers ===
- Parashat Bemidbar (Numbers 1:1–4:20):
  - 1:1–19 {S} 1:20–21 {P} 1:22–23 {P} 1:24–25 {P} 1:26–27 {P} 1:28–29 {P} 1:30–31 {P} 1:32–33 {P} 1:34–35 {P} 1:36–37 {P} 1:38–39 {P} 1:40–41 {P} 1:42–43 {P} 1:44–47 {P} 1:48–54 {P} 2:1–9 {S} 2:10–16 {S} 2:17 {S} 2:18–24 {S} 2:25–31 {P} 2:32–34 {P} 3:1–4 {P} 3:5–10 {P} 3:11–13 {P} 3:14–26 {S} 3:27–39 {S} 3:40–43 {P} 3:44–51 {P} 4:1–16 {P} 4:17–20
- Parashat Naso (Numbers 4:21–7:89):
  - {P} 4:21–28 {S} 4:29–37 {S} 4:38–49 {P} 5:1–4 {P} 5:5–10 {P} 5:11–31 {P} 6:1–21 {P} 6:22–23 {S} 6:24 {S} 6:25 {S} 6:26 {S} 6:27 {S} 7:1–11 {S} 7:12–17 {P} 7:18–23 {P} 7:24–29 {P} 7:30–35 {P} 7:36–41 {P} 7:42–47 {P} 7:48–53 {P} 7:54–59 {P} 7:60–65 {P} 7:66–71 {P} 7:72–77 {P} 7:78–83 {P} 7:84–89
- Parashat Beha'alotekha (Numbers 8:1–12:16):
  - {P} 8:1–4 {P} 8:5–22 {S} 8:23–26 {P} 9:1–8 {P} 9:9–14 {S} 9:15–23 {P} 10:1–10 {P} 10:11–28 {S} 10:29–34 {S} נ 10:35–36 נ {P} 11:1–15 {P} 11:16–22 {P} 11:23–35 {P} 12:1–3 {S} 12:4–13 {P} 12:14–16
- Parashat Shelach (Numbers 13:1–15:41):
  - {P} 13:1–33;14:1–10 {P} 14:11–25 {P} 14:26–45 {P} 15:1–16 {P} 15:17–21 {S} 15:22–26 {S} 15:27–31 {P} 15:32–34 {S} 15:35–36 {P} 15:37–41
- Parashat Korach (Numbers 16:1–18:32):
  - {P} 16:1–19 {S} 16:20–22 {S} 16:23–35 {S} 17:1–5 {P} 17:6–7 {S} 17:8–15 {P} 17:16–24 {P} 17:25–26 {P} 17:27–28 {S} 18:1–7 {P} 18:8–20 {S} 18:21–24 {P} 18:25–32
- Parashat Chukkat (Numbers 19:1–22:1):
  - {P} 19:1–22 {P} 20:1–6 {P} 20:7–11 {S} 20:12–13 {S} 20:14–21 {P} 20:22–29 {S} 21:1–3 {P} 21:4–16 {S} 21:17–20 {P} 21:21–35;22:1
- Parashat Balak (Numbers 22:2–25:9):
  - {S} 22:2–41; 23:1–30; 24:1–25 (Balaam & Balak) {P} 25:1–9
- Parashat Pinchas (Numbers 25:10–30:1):
  - {P} 25:10–15 {P} 25:16–18; 26:1a
  - Census: {P} 26:1b–11 {S} 26:12–14 {S} 26:15–18 {S} 26:19–22 {S} 26:23–25 {S} 26:26–27 {S} 26:28–32 {S} 26:33–34 {S} 26:35–37 {S} 26:38–41 {S} 26:42–43 {S} 26:44–47 {S} 26:48–51
  - {P} 26:52–56 {S} 26:57–65 {S} 27:1–5 {P} 27:6–11 {P} 27:12–14 {S} 27:15–23
  - Offerings: {P} 28:1–8 {P} 28:9–10 {P} 28:11–15 {S} 28:16–25 {S} 28:26–31 {P} 29:1–6 {S} 29:7–11
  - Sukkot offerings: {S} 29:12–16 {S} 29:17–19 {S} 29:20–22 {S} 29:23–25 {S} 29:26–28 {S} 29:29–31 {S} 29:32–34 {S} 29:35–39; 30:1
- Parashat Mattot (Numbers 30:2–32:42):
  - {P} 30:2–17 {P} 31:1–12 {S} 31:13–20 {S} 31:21–24 {S} 31:25–54 {P} 32:1–4 {S} 32:5–15 {S} 32:16–19 {P} 32:20–42
- Parashat Masei (Numbers 33:1–36:13):
  - {P} 33:1–39 {S} 33:40–49 {S} 33:50–56 {P} 34:1–15 {P} 34:16–29 {P} 35:1–8 {P} 35:9–34 {P} 36:1–13

Variants:

- Leningrad Codex: {P} 1:20 {S} 2:7 {-} 3:1 {S} 3:14 {-} 3:27 {S} 4:17 {P} 4:29 {P} 7:1 {P} 9:15 {S} 10:18 {S} 10:22 {S} 10:25 {S} 11:1 {P} 16:20 {P} 16:23 {P} 17:1 {-} 17:6 {P} 17:9 {S} 17:25 {S} 17:27 {S} 18:8 {S} 27:6 {S} 27:12 {P} 27:15 {S} 28:11 {P} 29:12 {P} 29:32 {P} 29:35 {P} 31:25

=== Deuteronomy ===
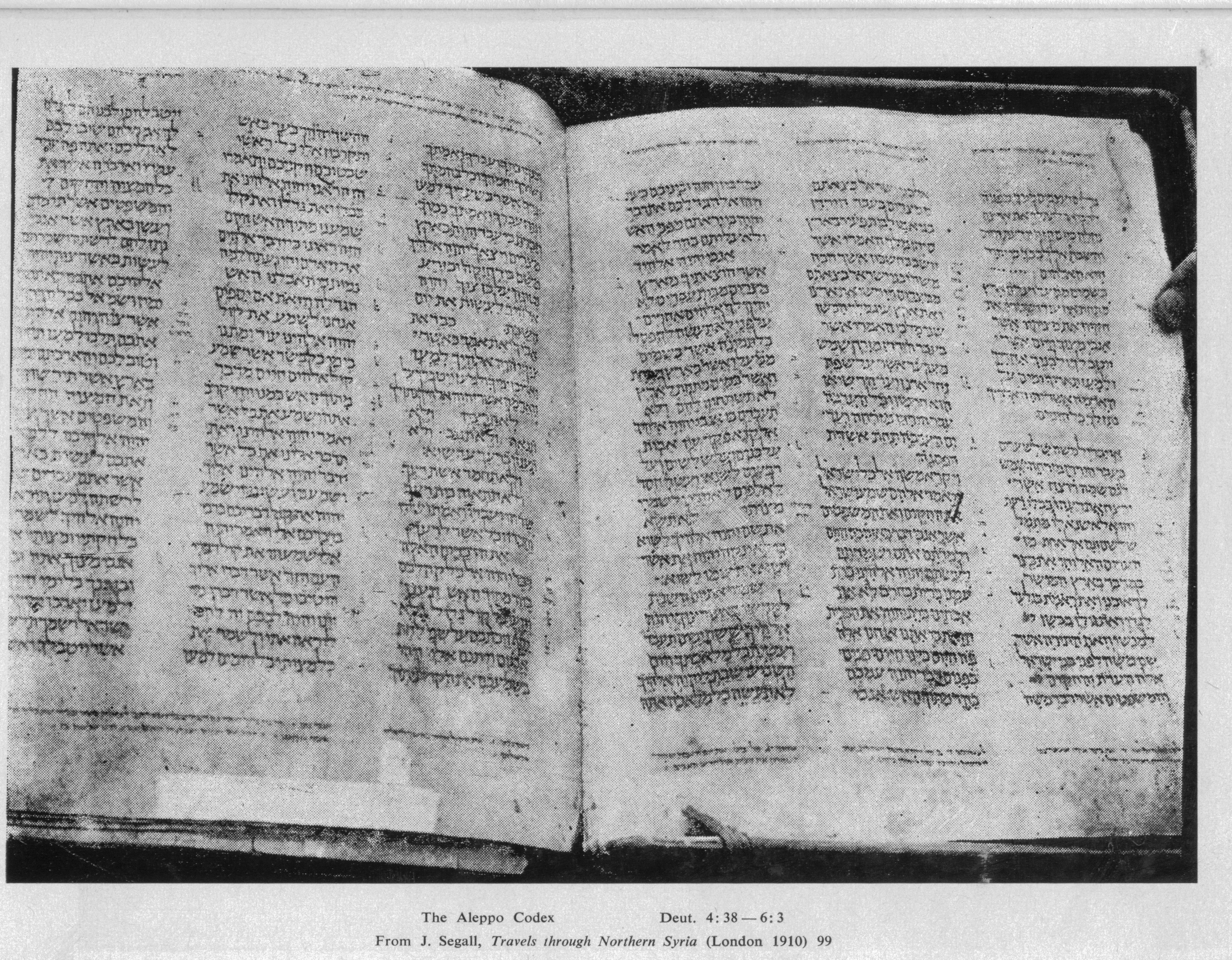
Two consecutive pages of the Aleppo Codex from the now-missing part of Deuteronomy were photographed in 1910 by Joseph Segall, containing the Ten Commandments. The image shows Deuteronomy 4:38 (גדלים) to 6:3 (ואשר), including the following parashah breaks: {P} 4:41 אז יבדיל {P} 5:1 ויקרא משה {S} 5:6 אנכי {S} 5:10 לא תשא {S} 5:11 שמור {S} 5:15 כבד {S} 5:16a לא תרצח {S} 5:16b ולא תנאף {S} 5:16c ולא תגנב {S} 5:16d ולא תענה {S} 5:17a ולא תחמד {S} 5:21b ולא תתאוה {S} את הדברים 5:22. These parshiot are shown in bold within the list below for Parashat Va'etchannan.

The Aleppo Codex is intact starting at Deuteronomy 28:17 (משארתך). Parshiot from the extant parts are in bold, as are the parshiot shown in the Segall photograph (image at right).

- Parashat Devarim (Deuteronomy 1:1–3:22):
  - 1:1–46; 2:1 {S} 2:2–8a {S} 2:8b–16 ונפן {S} 2:17–30 {S} 2:31–37; 3:1–22
- Parashat Va'etchannan (Deuteronomy 3:23–7:11):
  - {S} 3:23–29 {P} 4:1–24 {P} 4:25–40 **{P}** 4:41–49 **{P}** 5:1–5
  - Ten Commandments: **{S}** 5:6–9 אנכי **{S}** 5:10 לא תשא **{S}** 5:11–14 שמור **{S}** 5:15 כבד **{S}** 5:16a לא תרצח **{S}** 5:16b ולא תנאף **{S}** 5:16c ולא תגנב **{S}** 5:16d ולא תענה **{S}** 5:17a ולא תחמד **{S}** 5:17b ולא תתאוה
  - **{S}** 5:18–29;6:1–3 {P} 6:4–9 שמע {S} 6:10–15 {S} 6:16–18 {S} 6:19–25 {S} 7:1–11
- Parashat Ekev (Deuteronomy 7:12–11:25):
  - {P} 7:12–16 {S} 7:17–26 {P} 8:1–18 {P} 8:19–20 {P} 9:1–29 {P} 10:1–11 {P} 10:12–22;11:1–9 {S} 11:10–12 {S} 11:13–21 {S} 11:22–25
- Parashat Re'eh (Deuteronomy 11:26–16:17):
  - {S} 11:26–28 {S} 11:29–32;12:1–19 {S} 12:20–28 {S} 12:29–31;13:1 {P} 13:2–6 {S} 13:7–12 {S} 13:13–19 {S} 14:1–2 {S} 14:3–8 {S} 14:9–10 {S} 14:11–21 {P} 14:22–29 {S} 15:1–6 {S} 15:7–11 {S} 15:12–18 {P} 15:19–23 {P} 16:1–8 {S} 16:9–12 {P} 16:13–17
- Parashat Shofetim (Deuteronomy 16:18–21:9):
  - {S} 16:18–20 {S} 16:21–22 {S} 17:1 {S} 17:2–7 {P} 17:8–13 {S} 17:14–20 {S} 18:1–2 {S} 18:3–5 {S} 18:6–8 {S} 18:9–22 {S} 19:1–10 {P} 19:11–13 {S} 19:14 {S} 19:15–21 {S} 20:1–9 {S} 20:10–18 {S} 20:19–20 {P} 21:1–9
- Parashat Ki Tetzei (Deuteronomy 21:10–25:19):
  - {S} 21:10–14 {S} 21:15–17 {S} 21:18–21 {S} 21:22–23 {S} 22:1–3 {S} 22:4 {S} 22:5 {P} 22:6–7 {S} 22:8–9 {S} 22:10–11 {S} 22:12 {S} 22:13–19 {S} 22:20–21 {S} 22:22 {S} 22:23–24 {S} 22:25–27 {S} 22:28–29 {S} 23:1 {S} 23:2 {S} 23:3 {S} 23:4–7 {S} 23:8–9 {S} 23:10–15 {S} 23:16–17 {S} 23:18–19 {S} 23:20–21 {S} 23:22–24 {S} 23:25 {S} 23:26 {S} 24:1–4 {S} 24:5–6 {S} 24:7 {S} 24:8–9 {S} 24:10–13 {S} 24:14–15 {S} 24:16 {S} 24:17–18 {S} 24:19 {S} 24:20–22 {S} 25:1–4 {S} 25:5–10 {S} 25:11–12 {S} 25:13–16 {P} 25:17–19
- Parashat Ki Tavo (Deuteronomy 26:1–29:8):
  - {P} 26:1–11 {S} 26:12–15 {S} 26:16–19 {P} 27:1–8 {S} 27:9–10 {S} 27:11–14 {S} 27:15 {S} 27:16 {S} 27:17 {S} 27:18 {S} 27:19 {S/-} 27:20 {S} 27:21 {S} 27:22 {S} 27:23 {S} 27:24 {S} 27:25 {S} 27:26 {P} 28:1–14 {P} 28:15–68 **{S}** 28:69 **{P}** 29:1–8
- Parashat Nitzavim (Deuteronomy 29:9–30:20):
  - **{P}** 29:9–29:28 **{S}** 30:1–10 **{S}** 30:11–14 **{S}** 30:15–20
- Parashat Vayelekh (Deuteronomy 31:1–30):
  - **{P}** 31:1–6 **{S}** 31:7–13 **{P}** 31:14–30
- Parashat Ha'azinu (Deuteronomy 32:1–52):
  - **{P}** **Song of Moses: {SONG} 32:1–43 {SONG}**
  - **{P}** 32:44–47 **{P}** 32:48–52
- Parashat Vezot Haberakhah (Deuteronomy 33:1–34:12):
  - **{P}** 33:1–6 **{S}** 33:7 **{P}** 33:8–11 **{S}** 33:12–17 **{S}** 33:18–19 **{S}** 33:20–21 **{S}** 33:22–23 **{S}** 33:24–29 **{S}** 34:1–12

Variants:

- Leningrad Codex: {S} 7:7 {-} 13:7 {S} 16:22 {S} 18:14 {S} 19:8 {S} 19:11 {S} 22:9 {S} 22:11 {S} 23:8b לא תתעב מצרי {S} 24:6 {S} 24:9 {S} 24:21 {S} 25:4 {S} 25:14 {S} 27:1 {S} 27:20 {-} 24:8 {-} 24:20 {S} 28:15 {P} 30:11 {P} 31:7 {S} 31:16 {S} 33:8

== Nevi'im ==
parshiot in Nevi'im are listed here according to the Aleppo Codex, with variants from other masoretic traditions noted at the end of each book's section.

The Aleppo Codex is intact for the bulk of Nevi'im. The few parshiot noted here from its missing parts are listed according to the notes taken by Joshua Kimhi, who recorded the parshiot of the Aleppo Codex in the nineteenth century in the bible of Rabbi Shalom Shachna Yellin. These are indicated by an asterisk.

=== Joshua ===
- 1:1–9 {P} 1:10–11 {P} 1:12–18 {P} 2:1–24 {S} 3:1–4 {P} 3:5–6 {S} 3:7–8 {P} 3:9–17;4:1a {P} 4:1b–3 {S} 4:4–13 {S} 4:14 {P} 4:15–24 {P} 5:1 {P} 5:2–8 {P} 5:9–12 {S} 5:13–15;6:1 {S} 6:2–11 {P} 6:12–25 {P} 6:26 {S} 6:27;7:1 {S} 7:2–26 {P} 8:1–17 {P} 8:18–29 {P} 8:30–35;9:1–2 {P} 9:3–27 {P} 10:1–7 {P} 10:8–11 {S} 10:12–14 {S} 10:15–28 {S} 10:29–30 {S} 10:31–32 {P} 10:33–35 {P} 10:36–37 {S} 10:38–43 {P} 11:1–5 {P} 11:6–9 {S} 11:10–20 {S} 11:21–23 {S} 12:1–8
- {P} Canaanite Kings: {SONG} 12:9–24 {SONG}
- {P} 13:1–14 {P} 13:15–23 {P} 13:24–32 {P} 13:33 {S} 14:1–5 {P} 14:6–15 {P} 15:1–19
- Cities of Judah: {P} 15:20–32 {S} 15:33–36 {S} 15:37–41 {S} 15:42–46 {S} 15:47 {S} 15:48–49 {S} 15:50–51 {S} 15:52–54 {S} 15:55–57 {S} 15:58–59 {P} 15:60 {S} 15:61–63
- {P} 16:1–10 {P} 17:1–13 {S} 17:14–18 {P} 18:1–10 {P} 18:11–20 {P} 18:21–28 {P} 19:1–9 {P} 19:10–16 {P} 19:17–23 {P} 19:24–31 {P} 19:32–39 {P} 19:40–48 {S} 19:49–51 {P} 20:1–9
- Levite cities: {P} 21:1–2 {P} 21:3–4 {S} 21:5 {S} 21:6 {S} 21:7 {S} 21:8 {S} 21:9–12 {S} 21:13–16 {S} 21:17–19 {S} 21:20–22 {S} 21:23–26 {S} 21:27 {S} 21:28–29 {S} 21:30–31 {S} 21:32–33 {S} 21:34–35 {S} 21:36–40 {S} 21:41–43
- {P} 22:1–6 {P} 22:7–8 {P} 22:9–12 {P} 22:13–20 {S} 22:21–29 {P} 22:30–34 {P} 23:1–16 {P} 24:1–15 {P} 24:16–26 {P} 24:27–28 {P} 24:29–33

=== Judges ===
- 1:1–7 {P} 1:8–15 {P} 1:16–21 {P} 1:22–26 {P} 1:27–28 {S} 1:29 {S} 1:30 {S} 1:31–32 {S} 1:33–36 {P} 2:1a {P} 2:1b–5 {P} 2:6–10 {P} 2:11–23 {P} 3:1–6 {P} 3:7–11 {P} 3:12–30 {P} 3:31 {P} 4:1–3 {P} 4:4–24
- {P} Song of Deborah: {SONG} 5:1–31 {SONG}
- {P} 6:1–6 {P} 6:7–10 {P} 6:11–19 {P} 6:20–24 {S} 6:25–32 {S} 6:33–40 {P} 7:1 {S} 7:2–3 {S} 7:4–6 {S} 7:7–8 {P} 7:9–14 {P} 7:15–18 {P} 7:19–25;8:1–9 {P} 8:10–21 {P} 8:22–28 {P} 8:29–32 {P} 8:33–35 {P} 9:1–5 {S} 9:6–25 {P} 9:26–45 {P} 9:46–49 {P} 9:50–57 {P} 10:1–2 {P} 10:3–4 {P} 10:6–10 {P} 10:11–16 {P} 10:17–18 {P} 11:1–3 {P} 11:6–11 {P} 11:12–31 {P} 11:32–33 {P} 11:34–40 {P} 12:1–7 {P} 12:8–10 {P} 12:11–12 {P} 12:13–15 {P} 13:1 {P} 13:2–7 {P} 13:8–14 {S} 13:15–18 {P} 13:19–25 {P} 14:1–20 {P} 15:1–8 {P} 15:9–20 {P} 16:1–3 {P} 16:4–22 {P} 16:23–31 {P} 17:1–6 {P} 17:7–13 {P} 18:1 {P} 18:2–6 {P} 18:7–31 {P} 19:1–30 {P} 20:1–2 {P} 20:3–11 {P} 20:12–16 {P} 20:17–23 {P} 20:24–29 {P} 20:30–34 {P} 20:35–48 {P} 21:1–4 {P} 21:5–12 {P} 21:13–18 {S} 21:19–22 {S} 21:23–24 {P} 21:25

=== Samuel ===
- (1Sam) 1:1–28 {S} 2:1–10 {P} 2:11–21 {S} 2:22–26 {P} 2:27–36 {P} 3:1 {S} 3:2–3 {P} 3:4–5 {S} 3:6–10 {P} 3:11–18 {P} 3:19–20 {S} 3:21 {P} 4:1–17 {P} 4:18–22 {P} 5:1–5 {P} 5:6–8 {S} 5:9–12 {S} 6:1–2 {S} 6:3–14 {S} 6:15–16
- Philistine offering: {S} 6:17a {S} 6:17b {S} 6:17c {S} 6:17d {S} 6:17e {S} 6:17f
- {S} 6:18–21;7:1 {P} 7:2 {S} 7:3–4 {P} 7:5–17 {P} 8:1–3 {P} 8:4–6 {P} 8:7–9 {S} 8:10 {S} 8:11–21 {P} 8:22 {P} 9:1–14 {S} 9:15–20 {S} 9:21 {S} 9:22–27 {P} 10:1–9 {S} 10:10–11a {S} 10:11b–16 {S} 10:17–18a {P} 10:18b–22a {S} 10:22b–24 {S} 10:25–27 {P} 11:1–10 {S} 11:11–15 {P} 12:1–5 {P} 12:6–17 {S} 12:18–25 {P} 13:1–12 {S} 13:13–14 {S} 13:15–18 {S} 13:19=23 {S} 14:1–5 {S} 14:6–7 {S} 14:8–12a {P} 14:12b–16 {P} 14:17–19a {P} 14:19b–24 {S} 14:25–35 {P} 14:36–40 {S} 14:41–43 {S} 14:44–45 {S} 14:46–48 {P} 14:49–51 {S} 14:52 {P} 15:1 {S} 15:2–3 {S} 15:4–9 {P} 15:10–15 {P} 15:16 {S} 15:17–19 {S} 15:20–21 {S} 15:22–23 {S} 15:24–26 {S} 15:27 {S} 15:28 {S} 15:29–31 {S} 15:32 {S} 15:33 {S} 15:34–35 {P} 16:1–6 {S} 16:7–12a {P} 16:12b–16 {P} 16:17–23 {P} 17:1–11 {P} 17:12–14 {S} 17:15–16 {P} 17:17–19 {S} 17:20–15 {P} 17:26–33 {S} 17:34–26 {S} 17:37a {S} 17:37b–44 {S} 17:45–47 {S} 17:48–54 {S} 17:55–56 {S} 17:57–58;18:1–5 {P} 18:6–9 {S} 18:10–13 {S} 18:14–16 {P} 18:17 {S} 18:18–27 {S} 18:28–29 {P} 18:30 {S} 19:1–3 {S} 19:4–7 {S} 19:8–10 {P} 19:11–13 {S} 19:14 {S} 19:15–16 {S} 19:17–21a {P} 19:21b–24 {P} 20:1–4 {P} 20:5–8 {P} 20:9 {S} 20:10 {S} 20:11 {S} 20:12–17 {S} 20:18–23 {S} 20:24–26 {S} 20:27a {P} 20:27b–29 {S} 20:30–31 {S} 20:32–33 {S} 20:34 {S} 20:35–39 {S} 20:40–42 {P} 21:1–5 {P} 21:6–9 {S} 21:10a {S} 21:10b–14 {S} 21:15–16 {P} 22:1–4 {S} 22:5 {S} 22:6–8 {S} 22:9–11 {S} 22:12–13 {S} 22:14–17 {S} 22:18–23 {S} 23:1–2a {S} 23:2b–3 {S} 23:4–5 {S} 23:6–9 {S} 23:10–11a {S} 23:11b {S} 23:12 {S} 23:13–15 {S} 23:16–18 {S} 23:19–29 {S} 24:1 {S} 24:2–7 {S} 24:8 {S} 24:9–15 {P} 24:16–22 {S} 25:1 {P} 25:2–31 {S} 25:32–44 {S} 26:1–7 {S} 26:8–9 {P} 26:10–14 {P} 26:15–24 {P} 26:25 {P} 27:1–4 {S} 27:5–6 {P} 27:7–12 {P} 28:1–2 {P} 28:3–14 {S} 28:15 {S} 28:16–25 {P} 29:1–3 {P} 29:4–5 {S} 29:6–7 {S} 29:8–11 {S} 30:1–6 {S} 30:7–12 {S} 30:13–21 {S} 30:22 {S} 30:23–24 {S} 30:25 {P} 30:26
- Spoils: {S} 30:27a {S} 30:27b {S} 30:27c {S} 30:28a {S} 30:28b {S} 30:28c {S} 30:29a {S} 30:29b {S} 30:29c {S} 30:30a {S} 30:30b {S} 30:30c {S} 30:31
- {P} 31:1–7 {P} 31:8–13 {P} (2Sam) 1:1–12 {P} 1:13–16 {P} 1:17–27 {P} 2:1–4 {S} 2:5–7 {P} 2:8–9 {P} 2:10–11 {S} 2:12–32;3:1 {S} 3:2–5 {P} 3:6–8 {S} 3:9–11 {S} 3:12–13 {S} 3:14–30 {S} 3:31–32 {S} 3:33–37 {S} 3:38–39 {P} 4:1–3 {S} 4:4–12 {P} 5:1–3 {S} 5:4–10 {P} 5:11–12 {S} 5:13–16 {P} 5:17–19a {P} 5:19b–21 {P} 5:22–25 {P} 6:1–20a {S} 6:20b–23 {P} 7:1–4a {S} 7:4b–5a {S} 7:5b–17 {P} 7:18–24 {S} 7:25–29 {P} 8:1–8 {S} 8:9–18 {S} 9:1–13 {P} 10:1–16 {S} 10:17–19 {P} 11:1 {S} 11:2–15 {S} 1:16–24 {S} 11:25–27 {P} 12:1–6 {S} 12:7a {S} 12:7b–10 {S} 12:11–12 {S} 12:13a {S} 12:13b–25 {P} 12:26–31 {P} 13:1–22 {P} 13:23–27 {S} 13:28–30 {P} 13:31 {S} 13:32–33 {P} 13:34–39 14:1–4 {S} 14:5–7 {P} 14:8–9 {S} 14:10–12 {S} 14:13–17 {P} 14:18–20 {S} 14:21–23 {S} 14:24 {S} 14:25–27 {P} 14:28–30 {P} 14:31–33 {S} 15:1–6 {P} 15:7–9 {P} 15:10–18 {S} 15:19–24 {S} 15:25–26 {S} 15:27–37 {S} 16:1–9 {S} 16:10 {S} 16:11–13a {S} 16:13b {P} 16:14–19 {P} 16:20–23 {S} 17:1–4 {S} 17:5–6 {S} 17:7–13 {P} 17:14a {S} 17:14b {S} 17:15–20 {S} 17:21–23 {S} 17:24–26 {S} 17:27–29 {S} 18:1–2a {S} 18:2b–3 {S} 18:4–18 {S} 18:19–28a {S} 18:28b {S} 18:29–31 {S} 18:32 {S} 19:1–5 {S} 19:6–8a {S} 19:8b {S} 19:9 {S} 19:10–11 {S} 19:12–21 {S} 19:22 {S} 19:23–24 {S} 19:25–29 {P} 19:30–31 {S} 19:32–38 {S} 19:39–40 {S} 19:41–42 {S} 19:43 {S} 19:44{S} 20:1–3 {S} 20:4–5 {S} 20:6–8 {S} 20:9–14a {S} 2–:14b–19 {P} 2–:20–22 {S} 20:23–26 {S} 21:1a {S} 21:1b–6 {P} 21:7–14 {P} 21:15–17 {P} 21:18 {S} 21:19 {S} 21:20–22
- {P} Song of David: {SONG} 22:1–51 {SONG}
- {P} 23:1–7 {P} 23:8 {S} 23:9–10 {S} 23:11–12 {S} 23:13–15 {S} 23:16–17 {S} 23:18–19 {S} 23:20–23
- David's Thirty Champions: {S} 23:24 {S} 23:25a {S} 23:25b {S} {S} 23:26a {S} 23:26b {S} 23:26c {S} 23:27a {S} 23:27b {S} {S} 23:28a {S} 23:28b {S} {S} 23:29a {S} 23:29b {S} {S} 23:30a {S} 23:30b {S} 23:31a {S} 23:31b {S} {S} 23:32a {S} 23:32b {S} {S} 23:33a {S} 23:33b {S} {S} 23:34a {S} 23:34b {S} {S} 23:35a {S} 23:35b {S} {S} 23:36a {S} 23:36b {S} {S} 23:37a {S} 23:37b {S} {S} 23:38a {S} 23:38b {S} 23:39
- {P} 24:1–2 {S} 24:3–10a {P} 24:10b–11a {P} 24:11b–13 {S} 24:14–16 {S} 24:17 {P} 24:18–23a {S} 24:23b–25

=== Kings ===
The Aleppo Codex is missing three folios from II Kings that included 14:21 (את עזריה) to 18:13 (שנה). parshiot listed from the missing section are based upon Kimhi's notes on the codex and marked with an asterisk (*).

- (1Kings) 1:1–19a {P} 1:19b–27 {S} 1:28–31 {P} 1:32–53 {P} 2:1–10 {P} 2:11–12 {S} 2:13–22 {P} 2:23–25 {S} 2:26–27 {P} 2:28–38 {S} 2:39–40 {S} 2:41–46;3:1–2 {P} 3:3–14 {S} 3:15 {P} 3:16–23 {P} 3:24–27 {S} 3:28
- Solomon's officials: {S} 4:1 {S} 4:2 {S} 4:3a {S} 4:3b {S} 4:4a {S} 4:4b {S} 4:5a {S} 4:5b {S} 4:6a {S} 4:6b {S} 4:7 {S} 4:8 {S} 4:9 {S} 4:10 {S} 4:11 {S} 4:12 {S} 4:13 {S} 4:14 {S} 4:15 {S} 4:16 {S} 4:17 {S} 4:18 {S} 4:19–20;5:1
- {P} 5:2–5 {S} 5:6–8 {S} 5:9–14 {S} 5:15 {S} 5:16–25 {P} 5:26–28 {S} 5:29–30 {S} 5:31–32 {P} 6:1–10 {P} 6:11–13 {P} 6:14–38;7:1–12 {P} 7:13–26 {P} 7:27–37 {S} 7:38–39 {S} 7:40–50 {P} 7:51 {P} 8:1–11 {P} 8:12–21 {S} 8:22–34 {S} 8:35–36 {S} 8:37–53 {P} 8:54–66;9:1 {P} 9:2–9 {P} 9:10–13 {P} 9:14–22 {S} 9:23–28 {P} 10:1–13 {P} 10:14–17 {P} 10:18–25 {S} 10:26–29 {P} 11:1–6 {S} 11:7–10 {P} 11:11–13 {S} 11:14–25 {P} 11:26–28 {S} 11:29–39 {S} 11:40 {S} 11:41–43 {S} 12:1–17 {P} 12:18–19 {S} 12:20–21 {P} 12:22–24 {S} 12:25–33 {P} 13:1–10 {P} 13:11–20a {P} 13:20b–32 {P} 13:33–34 {P} 14:1–4 {P} 14:5–20 {P} 14:21–24 {P} 14:25–31 {P} 15:1–8 {P} 15:9–14 {S} 15:15–24 {P} 15:25–32 {P} 15:33–34 {S} 16:1–7 {P} 16:8–14 {P} 16:15–20 {P} 16:21–22 {P} 16:23–28 {P} 16:29–34 {S} 17:1 {S} 17:2–7 {S} 17:8–16 {P} 17:17–24 {P} 18:1–14 {S} 18:15–46;19:1–14 {S} 19:15–21 {P} 20:1–22 {P} 20:23–25 {P} 20:26–34 {S} 20:35–43 {P} 21:1–16 {P} 21:17–26 {P} 21:27 {P} 21:28–29;22;1 {P} 22:2–18 {S} 22:19–40 {P} 22:41–51 {S} 22:52–54;1:1–2(2Kings) {S} 1:3–14 {S} 1:15–17a {P} 1:17b {S} 1:18 {P} 2:1–18 {S} 2:19–22 {P} 2:23–25 {P} 3:1–3 {P} 3:4–10 {S} 3:11–27 {P} 4:1–7 {P} 4:8–37 {P} 4:38–41 {S} 4:42–44 {P} 5:1–19 {S} 5:20–27;6:1–7 {P} 6:8–23 {P} 6:24–33 {P} 7:1–2 {P} 7:3–20 {S} 8:1–4 {S} 8:5–6 {P} 8:7–15 {P} 8:16–24 {P} 8:25–29 {P} 9:1–28 {P} 9:29–37 {S} 10:1–14 {S} 10:15–17 {P} 10:18–29 {P} 10:30–36 {P} 11:1–3 {P} 11:4–12 {S} 11:13–16 {S} 11:17–20 {S} 12:1 {P} 12:2–6 {P} 12:7–17 {P} 12:18–22 {P} 13:1–9 {P} 13:10–13 {P} 13:14–19 {P} 13:20–21 {P} 13:22–25 {P} 14:1–7 {P} 14:8–16 {P} 14:17–22 {P*} 14:23–29 {P*} 15:1–7 {P*} 15:8–12 {P*} 15:13–16 {P*} 15:17–22 {P*} 15:23–26 {P*} 15:27–31 {P*} 15:32–38 {P*} 16:1–20 {P*} 17:1–6 {P*} 17:7–23 {P*} 17:24–41 {P*} 18:1–8 {P*} 18:9–12 {P*} 18:13–16 {P} 18:17–37;19:1–14 {P} 19:15–19 {S} 19:20–31 {S} 19:32–37 {P} 20:1–3 {S} 20:4–11 {P} 20:12–21 {P} 21:1–11 {S} 21:12–18 {P} 21:19–26 {P} 22:1–2 {P} 22:3–20;23:1–30 (Josiah's deeds) {P} 23:31–35 {S} 23:36–37;24:1–7 {P} 24:8–17 {P} 24:18–20 {S} 25:1–7 {S} 25:8–24 {P} 25:25–26 {P} 25:27–30

=== Isaiah ===
- Prophecies about Judah and Israel (1–12): 1:1–9 {P} 1:10–17 {S} 1:18–20 {P} 1:21–23 {S} 1:24–31 {P} 2:1–4 {P} 2:5–11 {P} 2:12–22 {P} 3:1–12 {P} 3:13–15 {S} 3:16–17 {S} 3:18–26;4:1 {S} 4:2–6 {P} 5:1–7 {P} 5:8–10 {S} 5:11–17 {S} 5:18–19 {S} 5:20 {S} 5:21 {S} 5:22–23 {P} 5:24–30 {P} 6:1–13 {P} 7:1–2 {S} 7:3–6 {P} 7:7–9 {P} 7:10–17 {P} 7:18–20 {P} 7:21–22 {S} 7:23–25 {P} 8:1–3a {S} 8:3b–4 ויאמר ה' אלי {S} 8:5–8 {S} 8:9–10 {S} 8:11–15 {P} 8:16–18 {S} 8:19–23;9:1–6 {P} 9:7–12 {S} 9:13–20 {S} 10:1–4 {P} 10:5–11 {P} 10:12–15 {P} 10:16–19 {S} 10:20–23 {P} 10:24–32 {P} 10:33–34 {S} 11:1–9 {S} 11:10 {P} 11:11–16;12:1–6
- Prophecies about the Nations (13–23): {S} 13:1–5 {S} 13:6–22;14:1–2 {S} 14:3–27 {P} 14:28–32 {P} 15:1–9;16:1–4 {S} 16:5–12 {S} 16:13–14 {P} 17:1–3 {P} 17:4–8 {S} 17:9–11 {S} 17:12–14 {P} 18:1–3 {S} 18:4–6 {S} 18:7 {S} 19:1–17 {S} 19:18 {S} 19:19–22 {S} 19:23 {S} 19:24–25 {S} 20:1–2 {S} 20:3–6 {P} 21:1–5 {S} 21:6–10 {P} 21:11–12 {P} 21:13–15 {S} 21:16–17 {S} 22:1–14 {P} 22:15–25 {P} 23:1–14 {S} 23:15–18
- Prophecies about Judah and Israel (24–35): {P} 24:1–15 {S} 24:16–20 {S} 24:21–23 {P} 25:1–5 {P} 25:6–8 {P} 25:9–12 {S} 26:1–10 {P} 26:11 {S} 26:12 {S} 26:13–15 {P} 26:16–19 {P} 26:20–21 {P} 27:1 {S} 27:2–6 {P} 27:7–11 {P} 27:12 {P} 27:13 {P} 28:1–4 {S} 28:5–6 {S} 28:7–8 {P} 28:9–13 {P} 28:14–15 {P} 28:16–17 {S} 28:18–22 {P} 28:23–29 {P} 29:1–8 {P} 29:9–12 {S} 29:13–14 {S} 29:15–21 {P} 29:22–24 {S} 30:1–5 {S} 30:6–11 {S} 30:12–14 {S} 30:15–18 {P} 30:19–26 {P} 30:27–33 {P} 31:1–3 {S} 31:4–9 {P} 32:1–8 {S} 32:9–20 {S} 33:1 {S} 33:2–6 {P} 33:7–9 {S} 33:10–12 {P} 33:13–24 {S} 34:1–17 {S} 35:1–2 {P} 35:3–10
- Narrative (36–39): {S} 36:1–10 {S} 36:11–16a {P} 36:16b–22 כי כה אמר {S} 37:1–14 {S} 37:15–32 {S} 37:33–35 {S} 37:36–38 {S} 38:1–3 {S} 38:4–8 {S} 38:9–22 {S} 39:1–2 {S} 39:3–8
- Consolations (40–66): {P} 40:1–2 {S} 40:3–5 {P} 40:6–8 {S} 40:9–11 {S} 40:12–16 {P} 40:17–20 {S} 40:21–24 {S} 40:25–26 {S} 40:27–31 {S} 41:1–7 {S} 41:8–13 {S} 41:14–16 {S} 41:17–20 {P} 41:21–24 {P} 41:25–29 {P} 42:1–4 {P} 42:5–9 {P} 42:10–13 {S} 42:14–17 {P} 42:18–25;43:1–10 {S} 43:11–13 {S} 43:14–15 {S} 43:16–21 {S} 43:22–28 {P} 44:1–5 {P} 44:6–20 {S} 44:21–23 {S} 44:4–28 {P} 45:1–7 {P} 45:8 {S} 45:9 {S} 45:10 {S} 45:11–13 {S} 45:14–17 {P} 45:18–25;46:1–2 {P} 46:3–4 {S} 46:5–7 {S} 46:8–11 {S} 46:12–13 {S} 47:1–3 {P} 47:4–7 {P} 47:8–15 {S} 48:1–2 {S} 48:3–11 {P} 48:12–16 {P} 48:17–19 {S} 48:20–22 {P} 49:1–4 {S} 49:5–6 {S} 49:7 {S} 49:8–13 {S} 49:14–21 {P} 49:22–23 {S} 49:24 {S} 49:25–26 {S} 50:1–3 {P} 50:4–9 {S} 50:10 {S} 50:11 {S} 51:1–3 {S} 51:4–6 {P} 51:7–8 {S} 51:9–11 {S} 51:12–16 {S} 51:17–21 {P} 51:22–23 {P} 52:1–2 {S} 52:3 {S} 52:4–6 {S} 52:7–10 {S} 52:11–12 {S} 52:13–15 {S} 53:1–12 {P} 54:1–8 {S} 54:9–10 {S} 54:11–17 {S} 55:1–5 {S} 55:6–13 {P} 56:1–2 {S} 56:3 {P} 56:4–5 v{S} 56:6–9 {P} 56:10–12;57:1–2 {S} 57:3–14 {S} 57:15–21 {P} 58:1–14 {P} 59:1–14 {S} 59:15–21 {S} 60:1–22 {S} 61:1–9 {P} 61:10–11;62:1–9 {S} 62:10–12 {S} 63:1–6 {S} 63:7–19;64:1–2 {S} 64:3–11 {P} 65:1–7 {S} 65:8–12 {P} 65:13–25 {S} 66:1–4 {S} 66:5–9 {S} 66:10–11 {S} 66:12–14 {S} 66:15–24

=== Jeremiah ===
Jeremiah is divided into distinct prophecies, each of which begins with an announcement of "the word of the Lord to Jeremiah" or a similar phrase. Each such prophecy begins a new open parashah {P} in the Aleppo Codex, with the single exception of the sixth prophecy (14:1) that begins with a closed parashah {S}.

The Aleppo Codex is missing two folios from Jeremiah, and the folio following them is also partly torn. The missing text included parts of chapters 29–32. parshiot listed from the missing parts are based upon Kimhi's notes on the codex and marked with an asterisk (*).

Prophecies of Destruction (1–25):

- First prophecy (1): 1:1–3 {P} 1:4–6 {S} 1:7–10 {P} 1:11–12 {S} 1:13–19
- Second prophecy (2:1–3:5): {P} 2:1–3 {P} 2:4–28 {S} 2:29–37;3:1–5
- Third prophecy (3:6–6:30): {P} 3:6–10 {S} 3:11–17 {S} 3:18–25 {S} 4:1–2 {S} 4:3–8 {P} 4:9 {S} 4:10–18 {P} 4:19–21 {P} 4:22–31 {S} 5:1–9 {S} 5:10–13 {S} 5:14–19 {P} 5:20–29 {S} 5:30–31; 6:1–5 {P} 6:6–8 {P} 6:9–15 {S} 6:16–21 {P} 6:22–30
- Fourth prophecy (7–10): {P} 7:1–2 {S} 7:3–15 {P} 7:16–20 {P} 7:21–28 {S} 7:29–31 {P} 7:32–34;8:1–3 {S} 8:4–12 {P} 8:13–16 {P} 8:17 {S} 8:18–22 {S} 8:23 {S} 9:1–5 {S} 9:6–8 {S} 9:9–10 {S} 9:11 {S} 9:12–13 {P} 9:14–15 {P} 9:16–18 {S} 9:19–21 {S} 9:22–23 {S} 9:24–25 {P} 10:1–5 {P} 10:6–10 {P} 10:11 {S} 10:12–16 {S} 10:17 {S} 10:18 {S} 10:19–21 {P} 10:22 {S} 10:23–25
- Fifth prophecy (11–13): {P} 11:1–5 {P} 11:6–8 {S} 11:9–10 {S} 11:11–13 {S} 11:14 {S} 11:15–17 {P} 11:18–20 {S} 11:21 {P} 11:22–23 {S} 12:1–3 {P} 12:4–6 {S} 12:7–12 {S} 12:13 {P} 12:14–17 {S} 13:1–2 {P} 13:3–7 {P} 13:8–10 {S} 13:11–12a {S} 13:12b–17 כה אמר {S} 13:18–19 {S} 13:20–27
- Sixth prophecy (14–17): {S} 14:1–9 {S} 14:10 {P} 14:11–12 {S} 14:13 {S} 14:14 {S} 14:15–18 {S} 14:19–22 {P} 15:1–9 {S} 15:10 {S} 15:11–14 {S} 15:15–16 {S} 15:17–18 {S} 15:19–21 {S} 16:1–2 {S} 16:3–4 {S} 16:5–8 {P} 16:9–13 {P} 16:14–5 {P} 16:16–18 {P} 16:19–21 {S} 17:1–4 {S} 17:5–6 {S} 17:7–10 {S} 17:11–13 {P} 17:14–18 {S} 17:19–27
- Seventh prophecy (18–20): {P} 18:1–4 {S} 18:5–6 {S} 18:7–8 {S} 18:9–10 {S} 18:11–12 {P} 18:13–17 {S} 18:18–23 {S} 19:1–5 {P} 19:6–13 {P} 19:14 {S} 19:15;20:1–3 {S} 20:4–6 {P} 20:7–12 {S} 20:13 {S} 20:14–18
- Eighth prophecy (21–24): {P} 21:1–3 {S} 21:1–3 {S} 21:4–10 {S} 21:11–14;22:1–5 {P} 22:6–9 {S} 22:10–12 {S} 22:13–17 {S} 22:18–19 {S} 22:20–27 {P} 22:28–30 {P} 23:1 {S} 23:2–4 {S} 23:5–6 {P} 23:7–8 {P} 23:9–14 {P} 23:15 {P} 23:16–22 {S} 23:23–29 {S} 23:30–40 {P} 24:1–2 {P} 24:3 {P} 24:4–7 {S} 24:8–10
- Ninth prophecy (25): {P} 25:1–7 {P} 25:8–14 {P} 25:15–27a {P} 25:27b–31 כה אמר {S} 25:32–38

Prophecies interwoven with narratives about the prophet's life (26–45):

- Tenth prophecy (26–29): {P} 26:1–6 {P} 26:7–10 {S} 26:11–15 {S} 26:16–24 {P} 27:1–22 {P} 28:1–11 {P} 28:12–17 {P} 29:1–9 {P*} 29:10–15 {S*} 29:16 {S*} 29:17–20 {P*} 29:21–23 {S*} 29:24–29 {P*} 29:30–32
- Consolations (30–33):
  - Eleventh prophecy (30–31): {P*} 30:1–3 {P*} 30:4–9 {S*} 30:10–11 {S*} 30:12–17 {S*} 30:18–22 {S*} 30:23–25 {S*} 31:1–5 {P*} 31:6–8 {P*} 31:9–13 {P*} 31:14 {S*} 31:15–19 {S*} 31:20–21 {P*} 31:22–25 {S*} 31:26–29 {S*} 31:30–33 {S*} 31:34–35 {S} 31:36 {S} 31:37–39
  - Twelfth prophecy (32–33): {P} 32:1–5 {P} 32:6–14 {S*} 32:15 {P*} 32:16–25 {S} 32:26–35 {S} 32:36–41 {S} 32:42–44 {P} 33:1–3 {P} 33:4–9 {S} 33:10–11 {S} 33:12–13 {S} 33:14–16 {S} 33:17–18 {P} 33:19–22 {S} 33:23–24 {S} 33:25–26
- Thirteenth prophecy (34): {P} 34:1–5 {S} 34:6–7 {P} 34:8–11 {P} 34:12–16 {S} 34:17–22
- Fourteenth prophecy (35): {P} 35:1–11 {P} 35:12–19
- Fifteenth prophecy (36–39): {P} 36:1–3 {S} 36:4–8 {P} 36:9–18 {S} 36:19–26 {S} 36:27–29 {S} 36:30–32 {P} 37:1–5 {P} 37:6–8 {P} 37:9–11 {S} 37:12–21;38:1–2 {S} 38:3–6 {S} 38:7–13 {S} 38:14–16 {S} 38:17a {S} 38:17b–18 כה אמר {S} 38:19–23 {S} 38:24–26 {P} 38:27–28a {S} 38:28b; 39:1–14 והיה כאשר {S} 39:15–18
- Sixteenth prophecy (40–45): {P} 40:1–6 {P} 40:7–12 {S} 40:13–16 {P} 41:1–10 {S} 41:11–15 {S} 41:16–18 {P} 42:1–6 {P} 42:7–22 {S} 43:1 {S} 43:2–7 {S} 43:8–13 {P} 44:1–6 {S} 44:7–10 {S} 44:11–14 {P} 44:15–19 {S} 44:20–23 {S} 44:24–25 {S} 44:26–29 {P} 44:30 {S} 45:1–5

Prophecies against the nations (46–51):

- Against the nations (46–49): {P} 46:1–12 {P} 46:13–19 {S} 46:20–26 {P} 46:27–28 {P} 47:1–7 {P} 48:1–11 {S} 48:12–39 {S} 48:40–47 {S} 49:1–6 {P} 49:7–11 {S} 49:12–19 {S} 49:20–22 {P} 49:23–27 {P} 49:28–33 {S} 49:34–39
- Against Babylon (50–51): {P} 50:1–7 {S} 50:8–16 {S} 50:17 {P} 50:18–20 {P} 50:21 {S} 50:22–27 {S} 50:28–30 {P} 50:31–32 {S} 50:33–46 {S} 51:1–10 {S} 51:11–14 {S} 51:15–19 {P} 51:20–24 {S} 51:25–32 {S} 51:33–35 {S} 51:36–51 {P} 51:52–53 {S} 51:54–57 {S} 51:58 {S} 51:59–64

Narrative (52):

- Destruction and Hope (52): {P} 52:1–23 {S} 52:24–27 {S} 52:28–30 {S} 52:31–34

=== Ezekiel ===
- Prophecies before the Fall of Jerusalem (1–24): 1:1–28 {P} 2:1–2 {P} 2:3–5 {P} 2:6–7 {P} 2:8–10 {S} 3:1–3 {P} 3:4–9 {P} 3:10–16a {P} 3:16b–21ויהי דבר {P} 3:22–27 {P} 4:1–3 {P} 4:4–12 {S} 4:13–14 {S} 4:15 {S} 4:16–17 {P} 5:1–4 {P} 5:5–6 {S} 5:7–9 {P} 5:10 {S} 5:11–17 {P} 6:1–10 {P} 6:11–14 {P} 7:1–4 {P} 7:5–22 {P} 7:23–27 {P} 8:1–6 {P} 8:7–8 {S} 8:9–14 {S} 8:15–18;9:1–3 {P} 9:4–11 {P} 10:1–22;11:1 {P} 11:2–3 {S} 11:4–6 {P} 11:7–13 {P} 11:14–15 {S} 11:16 {S} 11:17–25 {P} 12:1–7 {P} 12:8–16 {P} 12:17–20 {P} 12:21–25 {P} 12:26–28 {P} 13:1–7 {S} 13:8–12 {S} 13:13–16 {P} 13:17–19 {S} 13:20–23;14:1 {P} 14:2–3 {S} 14:4–5 {S} 14:6–8 {S} 14:9–11 {P} 14:12–20 {P} 14:21–23 {P} 15:1–5 {S} 15:6–8 {P} 16:1–35 {P} 16:36–50 {S} 16:51–58 {S} 16:59–63 {P} 17:1–10 {P} 17:11–18 {S} 17:19–21 {P} 17:22–24 {P} 18:1–20 {S} 18:21–23 {S} 18:24–26 {S} 18:27–32 {P} 19:1–9 {P} 19:10–14 {P} 20:1 {S} 20:2–26 {S} 20:27–29 {S} 20:30–31a {S} 20:31b–44 ואני אדרש {P} 21:1–5 {P} 21:6–10 {S} 21:11–12 {P} 21:13–18 {P} 21:19–22 {P} 21:23–28 {S} 21:29 {P} 21:30 {S} 21:31–32 {P} 21:33–37 {P} 22:1–16 {P} 22:17–18 {S} 22:19–22 {P} 22:23–31 {P} 23:1–10 {S} 23:11–21 {S} 23:22–27 {P} 23:28–31 {S} 23:32–34 {S} 23:35 {S} 23:36–45 {S} 23:46–49 {P} 24:1–5 {S} 24:6–8 {P} 24:9–14 {P} 24:15–24 {S} 24:25–27
- Prophecies about the Nations (25–32): {P} 25:1–5 {P} 25:6–7 {P} 25:8–11 {P} 25:12–17 {P} 26:1–6 {P} 26:7–14 {S} 26:15–18 {S} 26:19–21 {P} 27:1–3 {S} 27:4–36 {P} 28:1–5 {S} 28:6–10 {P} 28:11–19 {P} 28:20–24 {P} 28:25–26 {P} 29:1–7 {S} 29:8–12 {S} 29:13–16 {P} 29:17–18 {S} 29:19–21 {P} 30:1–5 {P} 30:6–9 {S} 30:10–12 {S} 30:13–19 {P} 30:20–21 {S} 30:22–26 {P} 31:1–9 {P} 31:10–14 {P} 31:15–18 32:1–2 {S} 32:3–10 {P} 32:11–16 {P} 32:17–32
- Prophecies after the Fall of Jerusalem (33–39): {P} 33:1–6 {P} 33:7–9 {P} 33:10–11 {P} 33:12–20 {P} 33:21–22 {P} 33:23–24 {S} 33:25–26 {S} 33:27–29 {P} 33:30–33 {P} 34:1–10 {S} 34:11–19 {P} 34:20–31 {P} 35:1–10 {S} 35:11–13 {S} 35:14–15 {P} 36:1–12 {S} 36:13–15 {P} 36:16–21 {P} 36:22–32 {S} 36:33–36 {S} 36:37–38 {P} 37:1–9a {S} 37:9b–14 כה אמר {P} 37:15–28 {P} 38:1–9 {S} 38:10–13 {S} 38:14–16 {S} 38:17 {S} 38:18–23 {S} 39:1–10 {S} 39:11–16 {P} 39:17–24 {S} 39:25–29
- Visions of the Future Jerusalem (40–48): {P} 40:1–49;41:1–26;42:1–20;43:1–9 (the future Temple) {S} 43:10–27a {S} 43:27b והיה ביום השמיני {S} 44:1–8 {S} 44:9–14 {P} 44:15–31 {P} 45:1–8 {P} 45:9–15 {P} 45:16–17 {S} 45:18–25 {S} 46:1–5 {S} 46:6–11 {P} 46:12–15 {S} 46:16 {S} 46:17–24;47:1–12 {P} 47:13–23 {P} 48:1–29 {S} 48:30–35

=== Twelve Minor Prophets ===
The Aleppo Codex leaves four empty lines between each of the books of the Twelve Minor Prophets. The Leningrad Codex leaves three lines. parshiot within each of the twelve individual books are listed below.

The Aleppo Codex is missing seven folios from two different sections of the Twelve Minor Prophets. parshiot listed from the missing sections are based upon Kimhi's notes on the codex and marked with an asterisk (*). The two sections are: (a) three missing folios that included Amos 8:13 to the end, Obadiah, Jonah, Micah until 5:1 (מקדם); (b) four missing folios that included Zephaniah 3:10 (הארץ) to the end, Haggai, Zechariah until 9:17 (דגן).

- Hosea: 1:1–2a {P} 1:2b–9 {P} 2:1–15 {S} 2:16–22 {P} 2:23–25 {P} 3:1–5 {P} 4:1–19 {P} 5:1–7 {S} 5:8–15;6:1–11 {P} 7:1–12 {S} 7:13–16;8:1–14 {P} 9:1–9 {P} 9:10–17 {S} 10:1–8 {P} 10:9–15; 11:1–11 {S} 12:1–15; 13:1–11 {P} 13:12–15; 14:1 {P} 14:2–10
- Joel: 1:1–12 {S} 1:13–20 {S} 2:1–14 {P} 2:15–27 {P} 3:1–5;4:1–8 {P} 4:9–17 {S} 4:18–21
- Amos:
  - Three and four transgressions: 1:1–2 {P} 1:3–5 {P} 1:6–8 {P} 1:9–10 {P} 1:11–12 {P} 1:13–15 {P} 2:1–2 {P} 2:4–5 {P} 2:6–16
  - {P} 3:1–10 {P} 3:11–15 {S} 4:1–9 {S} 4:10–13 {P} 5:1–15 {S} 5:16–17 {P} 5:18–27 {P} 6:1–10 {S} 6:11–14 {P} 7:1–6 {P} 7:7–9 {S} 7:10–11 {S} 7:12–17 {P} 8:1–3 {P} 8:4–8 {P} 8:9–10 {P} 8:11–14 {P*} 9:1–6 {P*} 9:7–12 {P*} 9:13–15
- Obadiah: There are no parashah divisions in the 21 verses of Obadiah (1:1–21).
- Jonah: 1:1–16;2:1–10 {P*} 2:11 {S*} 3:1–10;4:1–3 {P*} 4:4–11
- Micah: 1:1–16 {S*} 2:1–2 {S*} 2:3–13 {P*} 3:1–4 {P*} 3:5–8 {P*} 3:9–12 {P*} 4:1–5 {P*} 4:6–7 {P*} 4:8–14 {S*} 5:1–5 {P*} 5:6 {P} 5:7–14 {P} 6:1–8 {S} 6:9–16 {P} 7:1–8 {P} 7:9–13 {P} 7:14–20
- Nahum: 1:1–11 {S} 1:12–14 {P} 2:1–14 {P} 3:1–19
- Habakkuk: 1:1–17 {S} 2:1–4 {S} 2:5–8 {P} 2:9–11 {P} 2:12–14 {P} 2:15–18 {S} 2:19–20 {S} 3:1–13 {P} 3:14–19
- Zephaniah: 1:1–11 {S} 1:12–18 {S} 2:1–4 {S} 2:5–15 {P} 3:1–13 {P*} 3:14–15 {P*} 3:16–20
- Haggai: 1:1–2 {P*} 1:3–6 {P*} 1:7–11 {P*} 1:12–14 {P*} 1:15; 2:1–5 {P*} 2:6–9 {P*} 2:10–19 {P*} 2:20–23
- Zechariah: 1:1–6 {P*} 1:7–17 {P*} 2:1–2 {P*} 2:3–4 {S*} 2:5–9 {P*} 2:10–11 {P*} 2:12–13 {S*} 2:14–17 {P*} 3:1–10; 4:1–7 {P*} 4:8–14; 5:1–8 {S*} 5:9–11 {P*} 6:1–8 {P*} 6:9–15 {P*} 7:1–3 {S*} 7:4–7 {P*} 7:8–14 {P*} 8:1–5 {P*} 8:6 {P*} 8:7–8 {P*} 8:9–13 {S*} 8:14–17 {P*} 8:18–19 {P*} 8:20–22 {S*} 8:23 {P*} 9:1–8 {S*} 9:9–17; 10:1–2 {P} 10:3–12 {P} 11:1–3 {P} 11:4–11 {S} 11:12–14 {P} 11:15–17 {P} 12:1–14; 13:1–6 {P} 13:7–9 {P} 14:1–11; 14:12–21
- Malachi: 1:1–13 {S} 1:14; 2:1–9 {P} 2:10–12 {P} 2:13–16 {P} 2:17; 3:1–12 {P} 3:13–18 {P} 3:19–21 {S} 3:22–24

== Poetic layout of Psalms, Proverbs and Job ==
The three poetic books of Psalms, Proverbs and Job are collectively known as Sifrei Emet (see the article on Ketuvim). These three books share a unique system of cantillation unlike that of the other 21 books in Tanakh, a system designed to highlight the parallelisms in their verses.

In the Tiberian masoretic codices, the unique system of cantillation for Sifrei Emet is complemented by a scribal layout unlike that of the rest of the Bible: Instead of the three narrow columns per page typical of these codices, Sifrei Emet are written in two wide columns per page. In each line of these wide columns text begins on the right, followed by a gap, and then continued by further text until the left margin of the column. Although there is ample evidence that the scribes attempted to place the gaps in the middle of the lines at the points where the cantillation divides the verses, they often did not succeed in doing so because of space limitations. Modern editions based upon the Aleppo Codex have implemented the idea fully by allowing wide full-page columns for Psalms, Proverbs, and Job.

In poetic layout, parashah divisions are typically indicated by a blank line for an open parashah. The gaps in the middle of lines are not considered parashah divisions, and each scribe formatted the verses as he saw fit for aesthetic and practical reasons. An exception to this rule, however, is for the introductory titles of many individual psalms which are followed by formal parashah breaks, often by continuing the text at the beginning of the next line. These formal breaks will be indicated in the list of parshiot for Psalms.

The special poetic cantillation and layout are not implemented for the narrative opening and conclusion of the book of Job (1:1-3:1 and 42:7-17).

== Ketuvim ==
parshiot in Ketuvim are listed here according to the Aleppo Codex, with variants from other Masoretic traditions noted at the end of each book's section. The books of Ketuvim are presented in the order they appear in most printed Hebrew bibles. In Tiberian and early Sephardic Masoretic codices (such as the Aleppo Codex) the order is as follows: Chronicles, Psalms, Job, Proverbs, Ruth, Song of Songs, Ecclesiastes, Lamentations, Esther, Daniel, Ezra–Nehemiah.

The Aleppo Codex is largely intact until the word ציון ("Zion") in Song of Songs 3:11. It is missing the rest of Song of Songs, as well as the final books of Ketuvim in their entirety: Ecclesiastes, Lamentations, Esther, Daniel and Ezra–Nehemiah. It is also missing two folios which included about 10 psalms (15:1–25:1). Parshiot listed here from its missing parts are according to the notes taken by Joshua Kimhi, who recorded the parshiot of the Aleppo Codex for Rabbi Shalom Shachna Yellin in the nineteenth century. These are indicated by an asterisk. For some of the books that are largely or completely missing, charts have been provided below to allow for easy comparison of the parallel data found in the Masoretic manuscripts.

Key to symbols for variants:

- A = Aleppo Codex.
- A* = Aleppo Codex (parshiot in the lost parts based on Kimhi's notes).
- L = Leningrad Codex.
- Y = Cambridge University Library Add. Ms. 1753 (Yemenite). Yeivin regards this manuscript of Ketuvim as "a second or third hand copy" of a Tiberian manuscript "no less accurate and reliable than the Aleppo Codex."
- S1 = Sassoon 1053 (10th century). Yeivin judges this manuscript to be carelessly prepared by comparison with other accurate Tiberian codices.
- L34 = EBP. II B 34 of the Russian National Library in St. Petersburg, a carefully prepared manuscript of Ketuvim but with many gaps.
- F = Finfer, Pesah. Masoret HaTorah VehaNevi'im.
  - Ff = Finfer, "few books" (קצת ספרים). If a "few books" say one thing and a "few books" another, these are indicated by Ff1 & Ff2.
  - Fo = Finfer, "other books" (שאר ספרים).
  - C="Cairo"
  - D="Damascus"
  - Finfer also sometimes notes a tiqqun.
  - {-} Finfer notes that there is no parashah break at this verse.
  - (-) Finfer doesn't list this verse at all.

=== Psalms ===
The Aleppo Codex leaves two empty lines between the five Books of Psalms (following psalms 41, 72, 89, 106). Otherwise there is one blank line between each two psalms, the standard way of indicating an open parashah break {P} in poetic layout.

There is no break at all, however, between psalms 114–115, which were apparently considered a single psalm by the scribes. Psalm 119, which has sets of eight verses for each letter of the Hebrew alphabet, has an open parashah break (a blank line) between each set of eight verses.

The titles of individual Psalms have formal rules. Symbols for representing these rules are as follows, based on examples:

- 1 {-} = The psalm contains no format title, such as Psalm 1. The entire psalm is written in regular poetic layout.
- 3:1a {S/T} = There is a **closed** parashah within the **title verse** of a psalm. E.g. the title of psalm 3 is more than minimal, an entire verse containing more than one hemistich. There is a **closed** parashah division after the first hemistich. In masoretic manuscripts, this gap in the middle of the first title verse often closely resembles the poetic layout of the body of the psalm following the title verse.
- 4:1 {P} = The **first full verse** of a psalm is a **title** followed by an open parashah break, such as in Psalm 4. The text of the body of the psalm starts at the beginning of the next line.
- 11:1a {P} = The **beginning of the first verse** of a psalm is a **title** followed by an open parashah break in the middle of that verse, such as in Psalm 11. The text of the body of the psalm starts at the beginning of the next line. Besides formal titles, this form is also found after the word "halleluyah" at the beginning of a number of psalms (e.g. Psalm 106).
- 15:1a {S} = There is a closed parashah division following a title at the beginning of the first verse of the psalm, such as in Psalm 15. This is also found twice for a **full-verse title** in Psalms 70:1 {S} and 108:1 {S}.
- 26 {-/T} The beginning of the first verse of a psalm is a title, but there is no parashah division, such as in Psalm 26.

Book One (Psalms 1-41):

- 1 {-} · 2 {-} · 3:1a {S/T} · 4:1 {P} · 5:1a {S/T} · 6:1a {S/T} · 7:1a {S/T} · 8:1a {S/T} · 9:1a {S/T} · 10:1 {-} · 11:1a {P} · 12:1 {S/T} · 13:1 {P} · 14:1a {P} · 15:1a {S*} · 16:1a {P*} · 17:1a {P*} · 18:1a {P*} · 19:1 {P*} · 20:1 {P*} · 21:1 {P*} · 22:1a {S/T*} · 23:1a {S*} · 24:1a {P*} · 25:1a {S*} · 26 {-/T} · 27:1a {S} · 28 {-/T} · 29:1a {S} · 30:1 {P} · 31:1 {P} · 32:1a {S} · 33 {-} · 34:1a {S/T} · 35:1a {S} · 36:1 {P} · 37 {-/T} · 38:1 {P} 39:1 {P} · 40:1 {P} · 41:1 {P}

Book Two (Psalms 42-72):

- 42:1 {P} · 43 {-} · 44:1 {P} 45:1a {S/T} · 46:1a {S/T} · 47:1 {P} · 48:1 {P} · 49:1 {P} · 50:1a {P} · 51:1 {P} · 52:1 {P} · 53:1 {P} · 54:1 {P} · 55:1 {P} · 56:1a {S/T} · 57:1a {S/T} · 58:1 {P} · 59:1a {S/T} · 60:1a {S/T} · 61:1 {P} · 62:1a {S/T} · 63:1a {S/T} · 64:1 {P} · 65:1 {P} · 66:1a {S/T} · 67:1 {P} · 68:1 {P} · 69:1 {P} · 70:1 {S} · 71 {-} · 72:1a {S}

Book Three (Psalms 73-89):

- 73:1a {S} · 74:1a {S} · 75:1 {P} · 76:1 {P} · 77:1 {P} · 78:1a {P} · 79:1a {P} · 80:1a {S/T} · 81:1 {P} · 82:1a {P} · 83:1 {P} · 84:1 {P} · 85:1 {P} · 86:1a {P} · 87:1a {S/T} · 88:1a {P} 88:1b {S/T} · 89:1 {P}

Book Four (Psalms 90-106):

- 90:1a {P} · 91 {-} · 92:1 {P} · 93 {-} · 94 {-} · 95 {-} · 96 {-} · 97 {-} · 98 {-/T} · 99:1a {S} (not a title) · 100:1a {S} · 101:1a {S} · 102 {-/T} (first verse is title) · 103 {-/T} · 104 {-} · 105 {-} · 106:1a {P}

Book Five (Psalms 107-150):

- 107 {-} · 108:1 {S} · 109:1a {P} · 110:1a {P} [...] · 111:1a {P} · 112:1a {P} · 113:1a {P} · 114-115 {-} · 116 {-} · 117 {-} · 118 {-} · 119:1-8 {P} 119:9-16 {P} 119:17-24 {P} 119:25-32 {P} 119:33-40 {P} 119:41-48 {P} 119:49-56 {P} 119:57-64 {P} 119:65-72 {P} 119:73-80 {P} 119:81-88 {P} 119:89-96 {P} 119:97-104 {P} 119:105-112 {P} 119:113-120 {P} 119:121-128 {P} 119:129-136 {P} 119:137-144 {P} 119:145-152 {P} 119:153-160 {P} 119:161-168 {P} 119:169-176 · 120:1a {P} · 121:1a {P} · 122:1a {P} · 123:1a {P} · 124:1a {P} · 125:1a {P} · 126:1a {P} · 127:1a {P} · 128:1a {P} · 129:1a {P} · 130:1a {P} · 131:1a {P} · 132:1a {P} · 133:1a {P} · 134:1a {P} · 135:1a {P} · 136 {-} · 137 {-} · 138 {-/T} 139:1a {P} · 140:1 {P} · 141:1a {P} · 142:1a {P} · 143:1a {P} · 144 {-/T} 145:1a {P} · 146:1a {P} · 147:1a {P} · 148:1a {P} · 149:1a {P} · 150:1a {P}

=== Proverbs ===
- 1:1–7 {P} 1:8–19 {P} 1:20–33 {P} 2:1–22 {P} 3:1–10 {P} 3:11–18 {P} 3:19–35 {P} 4:1–19 {P} 4:20–27 {P} 5:1–6 {P} 5:7–23 {P} 6:1–5 {P} 6:6–11 {P} 6:12–15 {P} 6:16–19 {P} 6:20–26 {P} 6:27–35 {P} 7:1–27 {P} 8:1–31 {P} 8:32–36; 9:1–18
- Centered title: "The Proverbs of Solomon" **10:1a** (10:1b–19:9). There are no parashah divisions following the centered title until 19:10, an unusually large amount of unbroken text (278 verses).
- {P} 19:10–29; 20:1–30; 21:1–30 {P} 21:31; 22:1–29 {P} 23:1–5 {P} 23:6–35; 24:1–14 {P} 24:15–18 {P} 24:19–22 {P} 24:23–27 {P} 24:28–29 {P} 24:30–34
- {P} גם אלה משלי שלמה אשר העתיקו אנשי חזקיה מלך יהודה 25:1-13{P} 25:14–20 {P} 25:21–28; 26; 1–21 {P} 26:22–25; 27:1–22 {P} 27:23–27; 28:1–4 {P} 28:5–10 {P} 28:11–16 {P} 28:17–28; 29:1–17 {P} 29:18–27 {P} 30:1–6 דברי אגור בן יקה המשא {P} 30:7–9 {P} 30:10–14 {P} 30:15–17 {P} 30:18–20 {P} 30:21–23 {P} 30:24–28 {P} 30:29–33 {P} 31:1–7 דברי למואל מלך משא אשר יסרתו אמו {P} 31:8–9 {P} 31:10–31 אשת חיל.

=== Job ===
I. Narrative Opening (1:1–3:1):

- Common layout and regular cantillation: 1:1–5 {P} 1:6–22 {P} 2:1–10 {P} 2:11–13; 3:1.

II. Poetic Disputations: The disputations, which constitute the bulk of the book of Job, employ the special poetic layout in common with Psalms and Proverbs, along its associated poetic cantillation. In Tiberian masoretic codices, the formal title of each individual speech appears in the center of its line, while the body of the reply appears in poetic form (as in Psalms and Proverbs). The break between the title and the body is considered an open parashah, and the verse numbers for these titles appear in bold in the list. Blank lines as open parshiot are also used occasionally, and these are noted as {P}.

- Main Disputation (3:2–32:1):
  - Centered titles: **3:2** (Job 3:3–26)
    - First cycle: **4:1** (Eliphaz 4:2–21;5:1–27), **6:1** (Job 6:2–30; 7:1–21), **8:1** (Bildad 8:2–22), **9:1** (Job 9:2–35; 10:1–22), **11:1** (Zophar 11:2–20), **12:1** (Job 12:2–25; 13:1–28; 14:1–22)
    - Second cycle: **15:1** (Eliphaz 15:2–35), **16:1** (Job 16:2–22; 17:1–16), **18:1** (Bildad 18:2–21), **19:1** (Job 19:2–29), **20:1** (Zophar 20:2–29), **21:1** (Job 21:2–34), **22:1** (Eliphaz 22:2–30), **23:1** (Job 23:2–17; 24:1–25), **25:1** (Bildad 25:2–6), **26:1** (Job I 26:2–14), **27:1** (Job II 27:2–23; 28:1–28), **29:1** (Job III 29:2–25; 30:1–31; 31:1–40).
  - Conclusion of the main disputation: {P} 32:1.
- Elihu (32:2–37:24):
  - Introduction: {P} 32:2–5
  - Speech: {P} 32:6–22; 33:1–33 (Elihu I). Centered titles: **34:1** (Elihu II 34:2–37), **35:1** (Elihu III 35:2–16), **36:1** (Elihu IV 36:2–33; 37:1–24).
- God and Job (38:1–42:6):
  - God: {P} 38:1–41; 39:1–18 {P} 39:19–30.
  - God and Job (centered titles): **40:1** (God 40:2), **40:3** (Job 40:4–5).
  - God: {P} 40:6–32; 41:1–26 {P}.
  - Job (centered title): **42:1** (Job 42:2–6).

III. Narrative Conclusion (42:7–17):

- Common layout and regular cantillation: {P} 42:7 {S} 42:8–17.

=== Song of Songs ===
The Aleppo Codex is extant until the word ציון ("Zion") in Song of Songs 3:11. Bibles that show parshiot in the Song of Songs based upon the Aleppo Codex (with reconstruction of its missing parts based on Kimhi's notes) include two editions following the Breuer method (Horev and The Jerusalem Crown). The flow of text in such bibles is as follows:

- 1:1–4 {P} 1:5–8 {P} 1:9–14 {S} 1:15–17; 2:1–7 {S} 2:8–13 {S} 2:14 {S} 2:15–17 {S} 3:1–5 {S} 3:6–8 {S} 3:9–11 {S*} 4:1–7 {S*} 4:8–16;5:1 {S*} 5:2–16; 6:1–3 {S*} 6:4–9 {S*} 6:10 {S*} 6:11–12; 7:1–11 {S*} 7:12–14;8:1–4 {S*} 8:5–7 {S*} 8:8–10 {P*} 8:11–14

The Tiberian Masoretic codices are nearly identical in the parts at which they show parashah breaks in the text. However, while A and L have {S} almost exclusively, Y (which is usually very close to A) shows {P} for the large majority of parshiot, as shown in the chart below:

Words	Verse no.	Tiberian tradition			Other traditions
		A/A*	L	Y	Finfer
שחורה אני	1:5	{P}	{S}	{P}	{S}
לססתי	1:9	{P}	{S}	{S}	{S} Ff={P}
הנך יפה... עיניך יונים	1:15	{S}	{S}	{S}	{S}
קול דודי	2:8	{S}	{S}	{S}	{S}
יונתי	2:14	{S}	{S}	{P}	{S}
אחזו לנו	2:15	{S}	{S}	{P}	{S}
על משכבי	3:1	{S}	{S}	{P}	{S}
מי זאת עלה... כתימרות	3:6	{S}	{S}	{P}	{S}
אפריון	3:9	{S}	{S}	{P}	{S}
הנך יפה... מבעד לצמתך	4:1	{S*}	{S}	{P}	{S}
אתי מלבנון	4:8	{S*}	{S}	{P}	{S}
גן נעול	4:12	{-*}	{S}	{-}	{S}
אני ישנה	5:2	{S*}	{S}	{P}	{S} Ff={P}
יפה את רעיתי כתרצה	6:4	{-*}	{S}	{P}	{P}
מי זאת הנשקפה	6:10	{S*}	{S}	{S}	{S} Ff={P}
אל גנת אגוז	6:11	{S*}	{S}	{P}	(-)
לכה דודי נצא	7:12	{S*}	{S}	{P}	{-} Fo={S}
מי זאת עלה... מתרפקת	8:5	{-*}	{S}	{P}	{S}
אחות לנו קטנה	8:8	{S*}	{S}	{P}	{S}
כרם היה לשלמה	8:11	{-*}	{P}	{P}	{-} Ff={S} Fo={P}

=== Ruth ===
In the Tiberian Masoretic codices, the only parashah found in Ruth is for the short chronology at the end of the book:

- {P} 4:18–22 ואלה תולדות פרץ

Variant:

- While A, Y, L, and Ff1 all have {P} at 4:18, other traditions noted by Finfer differ: F={-}, Ff2={S}.

=== Lamentations ===
The Aleppo Codex lacks Lamentations in its entirety. Parshiot listed here are based upon Kimhi's notes on the codex.

- First lamentation (1:1–22): {S} between each of the 22 verses and {P} following the last one.
- Second lamentation (2:1–22): {S} between each of the 22 verses and {P} following the last one.
- Third lamentation (3:1–66): {S} between each of 66 verses and {P} following the last one.
- Fourth lamentation (4:1–22): {S} between each of the 22 verses and {P} following the last one.
- Fifth lamentation (5:1–22): 5:1–18 {P} 5:19–22

Variants:

- In the third lamentation, the Leningrad Codex has {S} between each set of three verses beginning with the same letter.

=== Ecclesiastes ===
The Aleppo Codex lacks Ecclesiastes in its entirety. Parshiot listed here are based upon Kimhi's notes on the codex.

- 1:1–11 {P*} 1:12–18; 2:1–26; 3:1
- {S*} **Song of the Seasons {SONG*} 3:2–8 {SONG*}**
- {S*} 3:9

There are no further parashah divisions at all in the rest of the book (3:9-12:14) according to Kimhi's notes on the Aleppo Codex, an unusually large amount of unbroken text (170 verses) that is confirmed by Y. The Leningrad Codex has a solitary parashah break: {S} at 9:11. The following chart compares the meager parashah breaks for Ecclesiastes as found in manuscripts:

Words	Verse no.	Tiberian tradition				Other traditions
		A*	Y	L	L34	Finfer
אין זכרון לראשונים	1:11	{-*}	{-}	{-}	{-}	{-} Ff={S}
אני קהלת הייתי מלך	1:12	{P*}	{S}	{P}	{S}	{-} Ff={S}
לכל זמן ועת לכל חפץ	3:1	{-*}	{-}	{-}	{-}	{-} Ff={S}
עת ללדת	3:2	{S*}	{S}	{S}	{P}	{-} Ff={S}
עת ללדת... ועת שלום	3:2-8	{S/P} **Song of the Seasons {SONG}** {S}				
שמר רגלך	4:17	{-*}	{-}	{-}	{S}	{-}
טוב שם משמן טוב	7:1	{-*}	{-}	{-}	{-}	{-} Fo={S}
לך אכל בשמחה לחמך	9:7	{-*}	{-}	{-}	{-}	{-} Ff={S}
שבתי וראה תחת השמש	9:11	{-*}	{-}	{S}	{S}	{-}
שמח בחור בילדותיך	11:9	{-*}	{-}	{-}	{S}	{-} Fo={S}

=== Esther ===
The book of Esther is traditionally read by Jews on the holiday of Purim from a handwritten scroll on parchment that must be halakhically valid. This means that the rules of open and closed parshiot are of more practical relevance for Esther than for any other book in Nevi'im or Ketuvim. Despite this—or perhaps because of the large numbers of scrolls of Esther that have been written, and the special attention that has therefore been paid to the problem by rabbis and scribes—manuscripts of Esther and opinions about how they should be written betray a relatively large number of discrepancies regarding the parashah divisions.

In the nineteenth century, Rabbi Shlomo Ganzfried published a manual for scribes called Keset HaSofer, in which he follows the rule that all parshiot in Esther are closed {S} (Keset HaSofer 28:5). This is currently the dominant tradition for Ashkenazic and Sephardic megillot (scrolls of Esther) today. But the Tiberian Masoretic codices contain both open and closed portions. Also, Yemenite scribes did not entirely adopt the tradition of closed portions, leaving the divisions in many scrolls of Esther similar to what is found in the Masoretic codices.

Ganzfried ruled that a scroll of Esther with open portions is invalid, but added that "some authorities validate it." When discussing these authorities in his additional notes, Ganzfried cites a list open parshiot found in the book Orḥot Ḥayyim (=OḤ), and concludes: "And even though our custom is that all of these are closed, it nevertheless seems that if some or all of these are open one may read from the scroll with a blessing." These have been listed in the chart below as "OḤ" under Keset HaSofer, and they are very similar to what is found in the Tiberian masoretic codices.

Words	Verse no.	Tiberian tradition				Other traditions	
		A*	Y	L	L34	Finfer	Keset HaSofer
גם ושתי המלכה	1:9	{-}	{-}	{-}		{S} DC={P}	{S}
ביום השביעי	1:10	{S}	{S}	{S}		(-)	{-}
ויאמר המלך לחכמים	1:13	{-}	{S}	{-}		(-)	{S}
ויאמר ממוכן	1:16	{P}	{P}	{S}		{S} DC={P}	{S} OḤ={P}
אחר הדברים האלה כשוך	2:1	{P}	{P}	{P}	{P}	{S} C={P}	{S} OḤ={P}
איש יהודי	2:5	{P}	{P}	{S}	{P}	{S} C={P}	{S} OḤ={P}
ובכל יום ויום	2:11	{S}	{-}	{-}	{-}	(-)	{-}
בימים ההם ומרדכי יושב בשער מלך	2:21	{S}	{S}	{S}	{S}	{S} C={P}	{S}
אחר הדברים האלה גדל	3:1	{P}	{P}	{P}	{P}	{S} C={P}	{S} OḤ={P}
ויאמר המן למלך	3:8	{S}	{S}	{S}	{S}	{S} C={P}	{S}
ומרדכי ידע	4:1	{S}	{S}	{P}	{P}	{S} C={P}	{S} OḤ={P}
ויאמר מרדכי להשיב	4:13	{P}	{P}	{P}	{P}	(-)	{-}
ויהי ביום השלישי ותלבש	5:1	{S}	{S}	{S}	{S}	(-)	{-}
ויאמר לה המלך מה לך	5:3	{S}	{-}	{S}	{S}	(-)	{-}
בלילה ההוא נדדה	6:1	{S}	{S}	{P}	{P}	{S} C={P}	{S}
ויאמר המלך אחשורוש ויאמר לאסתר המלכה	7:5	{S}	{S}	{S}	{S}	{S} C={P}	{S}
ויאמר חרבונה	7:9	{S}	{S}	{S}	{S}	(-)	{-}
ביום ההוא נתן המלך אחשורוש	8:1	{P}	{P}	{P}	{P}	{S} C={P}	{S} OḤ={P}
ותוסף אסתר ותדבר	8:3	{S}	{S}	{P}	{P}	{S} C={P}	{S}
ויאמר המלך אחשורוש לאסתר המלכה ולמרדכי	8:7	{S}	{S}	{S}	{S}	{S} C={P}	{S}
ומרדכי יצא מלפני המלך	8:15	{S}	{S}	{P}		{S} C={P}	{S}
ויכו היהודים בכל איביהם	9:5	{-}	{-}	{P}		(-)	{-}
ואת פרשנדתא... ואת ויזתא	9:7-9	{S} **Haman's Sons {SONG}** {S}					
ויאמר המלך לאסתר המלכה בשושן הבירה	9:12	{-}	{-}	{S}		(-)	{-}
ויכתב מרדכי את הדברים האלה	9:20	{S}	{S}	{P}	{P}	(-)	{-}
ותכתב אסתר המלכה	9:29	{S}	{S}	{S}	{S}	{-} Fo1={P} Fo2+tiqqun={S}	{S}
וישם המלך אחשורוש מס	10:1	{S}	{S}	{P}	{P}	{S} C={P}	{S}

Most printed Jewish bibles, even those based on manuscripts, show the flow of text in Esther according to the widespread tradition based on Keset HaSofer (only closed parshiot). Such editions include the Koren edition (Jerusalem, 1962), Breuer's first edition (Jerusalem, 1982) and Dotan's editions (which are otherwise based upon the Leningrad Codex). The flow of text in such bibles is as follows:

- 1:1–8 {S} 1:9–12 {S} 1:13–15 {S} 1:16–22 {S} 2:1–4 {S} 2:5–20 {S} 2:21–23 {S} 3:1–7 {S} 3:8–15 {S} 4:1–17; 5:1–14 {S} 6:1–14;7:1–4 {S} 7:5–8 {S} 7:9–10 {S} 8:1–2 {S} 8:3–6 {S} 8:7–14 {S} 8:15–17; 9:1–6
- {S} **Haman's Sons: {SONG} 9:7–9 {SONG}**
- {S} 9:10–28 {S} 9:29–32 {S} 10:1–3

Bibles that show the parshiot in Esther based upon a reconstruction of the Aleppo Codex include two editions following the Breuer method (Horev and The Jerusalem Crown). The flow of text in such bibles is as follows:

- 1:1–9 {S*} 1:10–15 {P*} 1:16–22 {P*} 2:1–4 {P*} 2:5–10 {S*} 2:11–20 {S*} 2:21–23 {P*} 3:1–7 {S*} 3:8–15 {S*} 4:1–12 {P*} 4:13–17 {S*} 5:1–2 {S*} 5:3–14 {S*} 6:1–14;7:1–4 {S*} 7:5–8 {S*} 7:9–10 {P*} 8:1–2 {S*} 8:3–6 {S*} 8:7–14 {S*} 8:15–17;9:1–6
- {S*} **Haman's Sons: {SONG*} 9:7–9 {SONG*}**
- {S*} 9:10–19 {S*} 9:20–28 {S*} 9:29–32 {S*} 10:1–3

=== Daniel ===
The Aleppo Codex lacks Daniel in its entirety. parshiot listed here are based upon Kimhi's notes on the codex.

- 1:1–21 {S} 2:1–13 {S} 2:14–16 {S} 2:17–24 {S} 2:25–28 {S} 2:29–30 {S} 2:31–45 {S} 2:46–49 {P} 3:1–18 {P} 3:19–23 {P} 3:24–30 {P} 3:31–33; 4:1–25 {P} 4:26–34 {P} 5:1–7 {S} 5:8–12 {P} 5:13–16 {P} 5:17–30 {P} 6:1–6 {S} 6:7–11 {S} 6:12–14 {P} 6:15 {S} 6:16–29
- {P} 7:1–14 {P} 7:15–28 {P} 8:1–27 {P} 9:1–27 {S} 10:1–3 {P} 10:4–21 {P} 11:1–45; 12:1–3 {P} 12:4–13

=== Ezra–Nehemiah ===
The Aleppo Codex lacks Ezra–Nehemiah in its entirety. parshiot listed here are based upon Kimhi's notes on the codex.

- (Ezra) 1:1–8 {S} 1:9 {S} 1:10–11
- People of the province who returned to Jerusalem: {P} 2:1–2 {S} 2:3 {S} 2:4 {S} 2:5 {S} 2:6 {S} 2:7 {S} 2:8 {S} 2:9 {S} 2:10 {S} 2:11 {S} 2:12 {S} 2:13 {S} 2:14 {S} 2:15 {S} 2:16 {S} 2:17 {S} 2:18 {S} 2:19 {S} 2:20 {S} 2:21 {S} 2:22 {S} 2:23 {S} 2:24 {S} 2:25 {S} 2:26 {S} 2:27 {S} 2:28 {S} 2:29 {S} 2:30 {S} 2:31 {S} 2:32 {S} 2:33 {S} 2:34 {S} 2:35 {S} 2:36 {S} 2:37 {S} 2:38 {S} 2:39 {S} 2:40 {S} 2:41 {S} 2:42 {S} 2:43 {S} 2:44 {S} 2:45 {S} 2:46 {S} 2:47 {S} 2:48 {S} 2:49 {S} 2:50 {S} 2:51 {S} 2:52 {S} 2:53 {S} 2:54 {S} 2:55 {S} 2:56 {S} 2:57 {S} 2:58 {S} 2:59 {P} 2:60 {S} 2:61 {S} 2:62–66 {S} 2:67 {P} 2:68–69 {S} 2:70
- {S} 3:1a {S} 3:1b {S} 3:2–7 {P} 3:8–9a {S} 3:9b–13 בני חנדד {P} 4:1–6 {S} 4:7 {P} 4:8–11 {P} 4:12 {S} 4:13 {S} 4:14–16 {P} 4:17 {P} 4:18–22 {S} 4:23 {S} 4:24 {P} 5:1 {S} 5:2 {P} 5:3–5 {P} 5:6–7 {S} 5:8–10 {P} 5:11–12 {P} 5:13–15 {P} 5:16–17 {P} 6:1–2 {P} 6:3–4 {S} 6:5 {S} 6:6–12 {P} 6:13–15 {P} 6:16–18 {P} 6:19–22 {P} 7:1–6 {P} 7:7–10 {S} 7:11 {P} 7:12–24 {P} 7:25–26 {P} 7:27–28
- Chiefs of the clans: {P} 8:1 {S} 8:2a {S} 8:2b {S} 8:2c {S} 8:3a מבני שכניה {S} 8:3b מבני פרעש {S} 8:4 {S} 8:5 {S} 8:6 {S} 8:7 {S} 8:8 {S} 8:9 {S} 8:10 {S} 8:11 {S} 8:12 {S} 8:13 {S} 8:14
- {S} 8:15-18a {S} 8:18b-19 מבני מחלי {S} 8:20-30 {P} 18:31-34 {P} 18:35 {P} 18:36 {S} 9:1–9 {S} 9:10–14 {S} 9:15 {P} 10:1 {P} 10:2–3 {P} 10:4 {P} 10:5–8 {P} 10:9 {P} 10:10–11 {S} 10:12–14 {S} 10:15–17
- Priestly families who were found to have foreign women: {P} 10:18–19 {S} 10:20 {S} 10:21 {S} 10:22 {S} 10:23 {S} 10:24 {S} 10:25 {S} 10:26 {S} 10:27 {S} 10:28 {S} 10:29 {S} 10:30 {S} 10:31 {S} 10:32 {S} 10:33 {S} 10:34 {S} 10:35 {S} 10:36 {S} 10:37 {S} 10:38 {S} 10:39 {S} 10:40 {S} 10:41 {S} 10:42 {S} 10:43–44
- {P} (Nehemiah) 1:1–11 {P} 2:1–9 {P} 2:10–18 {P} 2:19–20
- Builders: {P} 3:1 {S} 3:2 {S} 3:3 {S} 3:4b {S} 3:4c {S} 3:4a {S} 3:5 {S} 3:6 {S} 3:7 {S} 3:8a {S} 3:8b {S} 3:9 {S} 3:10 {S} 3:11 {S} 3:12 {S} 3:13–14 {S} 3:15 {S} 3:16 {S} 3:17a {S} 3:17b {S} 3:18 {S} 3:19 {S} 3:20 {S} 3:21 {S} 3:22–23a {S} 3:23b {S} 3:24–25 {S} 3:26 {S} 3:27–28 {S} 3:29a {S} 3:29b {S} 3:30a {S} 3:30b {S} 3:31–32
- {P} 3:33–35 {P} 3:36–38 {P} 4:1–8 {P} 4:9–17 {P} 5:1–8 {P} 5:9–19 6:1–4 {P} 6:5–7 {P} 6:8–13 {P} 6:14–15 {P} 6:16–19 {P} 7:1–5
- People of the province who returned to Jerusalem: {P} 7:6–7 {S} {S} 7:7 {S} 7:8 {S} 7:9 {S} 7:10 {S} 7:11 {S} 7:12 {S} 7:13 {S} 7:14 {S} 7:15 {S} 7:16 {S} 7:17 {S} 7:18 {S} 7:19 {S} 7:20 {S} 7:21 {S} 7:22 {S} 7:23 {S} 7:24 {S} 7:25 {S} 7:26 {S} 7:27 {S} 7:28 {S} 7:29 {S} 7:30 {S} 7:31 {S} 7:32 {S} 7:33 {S} 7:34 {S} 7:35 {S} 7:36 {S} 7:37 {S} 7:38 {P} 7:39 {S} 7:40 {S} 7:41 {S} 7:42 {S} 7:43 {S} 7:44 {S} 7:45 {P} 7:46 {S} 7:47 {S} 7:48 {S} 7:49 {S} 7:50 {S} 7:51 {S} 7:52 {S} 7:53 {S} 7:54 {S} 7:55 {S} 7:56 {S} 7:57 {S} 7:58 {S} 7:59a {S} 7:59b בני פרכת {P} 7:60 {P} 7:61 {S} 7:62 {S} 7:63–67 {S} 7:68–69 {S} 7:70–72a {S} 7:72b; 8:1–4 ויגע החדש השביעי {S} 8:5–8 {P} 8:9–12 {P} 8:13–15 {S} 8:16 {S} 8:17–18 {P} 9:1–3 {P} 9:4–37 {P} 10:1–14 {S} 10:15–34 {S} 10:35–40;11:1–2 {P} 11:3–6 {P} 11:7–9 {P} 11:10–14 {S} 11:15–18 {P} 11:19–21 {P} 11:22–36 {P} 12:1–7 {P} 12:8–22 {P} 12:23–26 {P} 12:27–34 {P} 12:35–47 {P} 13:1–9 {P} 13:10–13 {P} 13:14–18 {P} 13:19–21 {P} 13:22 {P} 13:23–30a {P} 13:30b–31 ואעמידה משמרות.

=== Chronicles ===
- Chronology until David (1 Chronicles 1–10): 1:1–4 {S} 1:5 {S} 1:6 {S} 1:7 {S} 1:8–9 {S} 1:10 {S} 1:11–12 {S} 1:13–16 {S} 1:17 {S} 1:18–23 {S} 1:24–27 {S} 1:28 {S} 1:29–31 {S} 1:32 {S} 1:33 {S} 1:34 {S} 1:35 {S} 1:36 {S} 1:37 {S} 1:38 {S} 1:39 {S} 1:40 {S} 1:41–42 {P} 1:43–51a {P} 1:51b–54 ויהיו אלופי אדום {P} 2:1–2 {P} 2:3 {S} 2:4 {S} 2:5 {S} 2:6 {S} 2:7 {S} 2:8 {S} 2:9–20 {S} 2:21–22 {S} 2:23–24 {S} 2:25–26 {S} 2:27–32 {S} 2:33–41 {S} 2:42–46 {S} 2:47–49 {S} 2:50–53 {S} 2:54–55 {S} 3:1–4 {S} 3:5–9 {P} 3:10–23 {S} 3:24 {S} 4:1–2 {S} 4:3–10 {S} 4:11–12 {S} 4:13–14 {P} 4:15–18 {S} 4:19–23 {S} 4:24–27 {S} 4:28–33a {S} 4:33b–43 זאת מושבתם {P} 5:1–2 {S} 5:3–10 {S} 5:11–13 {S} 5:14–17 {P} 5:18–22 {P} 5:23–26 {P} 5:27–28 {S} 5:29a {S} 5:29b–41 ובני אהרן {P} 6:1–3 {S} 6:4–13 {S} 6:14–15 {P} 6:16–23 {S} 6:24–28 {S} 6:29–32 {S} 6:33–34 {P} 6:35–38 {S} 6:39–41 {S} 6:42–44 {S} 6:45 {S} 6:46 {P} 6:47 {S} 6:48 {S} 6:49–50 {S} 6:51–55 {P} 6:56–58 {S} 6:59–60 {S} 6:61 {S} 6:62–66 {S} 7:1 {S} 7:2 {S} 7:3–5 {S} 7:6–13 {P} 7:14–19 {P} 7:20–29 {P} 7:30–40 {S} 8:1–32 {S} 8:33–40 {P} 9:1 {S} 9:2–4 {S} 9:5–9 {S} 9:10–11 {S} 9:12–34 {S} 9:35–38 {S} 9:39 –44 {P} 10:1–4a {S} 10:4b–5 ויקח שאול {S} 10:6–7 {S} 10:8–10 {S} 10:11–14
- King David (1 Chronicles 11–29):
  - {P} 11:1–3 {S} 11:4–9 {P} 11:10 {S} 11:11–21 {S} 11:22–25
  - David's champions (11:26–47): {S} 11:26a {S} 11:26b אלחנן {S} 11:27a {S} 11:27b חלץ {S} 11:28a {S} 11:28b אביעזר {S} 11:29a {S} 11:29b עילי {S} 11:30a {S} 11:30b חלד {S} 11:31a {S} 11:31b בניה {S} 11:32a {S} 11:32b אביאל {S} 11:33a {S} 11:33b אליחבא {S} 11:34a {S} 11:34b יונתן {S} 11:35a {S} 11:35b אליפל {S} 11:36 {S} 11:37a {S} 11:37b נערי {S} 11:38a {S} 11:38b מבחר {S} 11:39 {S} 11:40a {S} 11:40b גרב {S} 11:41a {S} 11:41b זבד {S} 11:42a {S} 11:42b חנן {S} 11:43 {S} 11:44a {S} 11:44b שמע {S} 11:45 {S} 11:46a {S} 11:46b–47a ויתמה {S} 11:47b ויעשיאל.
  - {P} 12:1–5 {S} 12:6–14 {S} 12:15–16 {P} 12:17–18 {S} 12:19 {P} 12:20–23
  - David's supporters in Hebron: {P} 12:24 {S} 12:25 {S} 12:26 {S} 12:27 {S} 12:28 {S} 12:29 {S} 12:30 {S} 12:31 {S} 12:32 {S} 12:33 {S} 12:34 {S} 12:35 {S} 12:36 {S} 12:37 {S} 12:38 {S} 12:38–41
  - {P} 13:1–14 {S} 14:1–2 {S} 14:3–7 {P} 14:8–12 {P} 14:13–17;15:1–2 {P} 15:3–4 Levites: {S} 15:5 {S} 15:6 {S} 15:7 {S} 15:8 {S} 15:9 {S} 15:10 {P} 15:11 {S} 15:12–15 {P} 15:16 {P} 15:17a {S} 15:17b–25 ומן בני מררי {P} 15:26–29 {P} 16:1–4 {S} 16:5–7
  - {P} **Song of Assaf: {SONG} 16:8–22 {P} 16:23–36 {SONG}**
  - {P} 16:37–38 {S} 16:39–43 {P} 17:1–2 {S} 17:3–7a {S} 17:7b–15 כה אמר {P} 17:16–27 18:1–8 {P} 18:9–17 {P} 19:1–5 {S} 19:6–7a {S} 19:7b ובני עמון {S} 19:8–12a {S} 19:12b–15 ואם בני עמון {S} 19:16–19 {S} 20:1–3 {S} 20:4–5 {S} 20:6–8 {P} 21:1–7 {S} 21:8 {P} 21:9–12 {S} 21:13–15 {S} 21:16–17 {S} 21:18–26 {S} 21:27–30 {S} 22:1 {P} 22:2–4 {P} 22:5–6 {S} 22:7–17 {S} 22:18–19 {P} 23:1–5 {S} 23:6 {S} 23:7 {S} 23:8 {S} 23:9 {S} 23:10–11 {S} 23:12 {S} 23:13–14 {S} 23:15–17 {S} 23:18–23 {S} 23:24–32 {P} 24:1–5 {S} 24:6
  - {P} 24:7a {S} 24:7b לידעיה {S} 24:8a {S} 24:8b לשערים {S} 24:9a {S} 24:9b למימן {S} 24:10a {S} 24:10b לאביה {S} 24:11a {S} 24:11b לשכניהו {S} 24:12a {S} 24:12b ליקים {S} 24:13a {S} 24:13b לישבאב {S} 24:14a {S} 24:14b לאמר {S} 24:15a {S} 24:15b להפצץ {S} 24:16a {S} 24:16b ליחזקאל {S} 24:17a {S} 24:17b לגמול {S} 24:18a {S} 24:18b למעזיהו.
  - {P} 24:19 {P} 24:20 {S} 24:21 {S} 24:22 {S} 24:23 {S} 24:24 {S} 24:25 {S} 24:26 {S} 24:27 {S} 24:28 {S} 24:29 {S} 24:30–31 {S} 25:1–3 {S} 25:4–8 {P} 25:9a {S} 25:9b גדליהו {S} 25:10 {S} 25:11 {S} 25:12 {S} 25:13 {S} 25:14 {S} 25:15 {S} 25:16 {S} 25:17 {S} 25:18 {S} 25:19 {S} 25:20 {S} 25:21 {S} 25:22 {S} 25:23 {S} 25:24 {S} 25:25 {S} 25:26 {S} 25:27 {S} 25:28 {S} 25:29 {S} 25:30 {S} 25:31 {P} 26:1–5 {S} 26:6–13 {P} 26:14–16 {S} 26:17a {S} 26:17b–20 ולאספים {S} 26:21 {S} 26:22 {S} 26:23–24 {S} 26:25–28 {P} 26:29–32 {P} 27:1 {P} 27:2 {S} 27:3 {S} 27:4 {S} 27:5–6 {S} 27:7 {S} 27:8 {S} 27:9 {S} 27:10 {S} 27:11 {S} 27:12 {S} 27:13 {S} 27:14 {S} 27:15 {P} 27:16a {S} 27:16b לשמעוני {S} 27:17 {S} 27:18a {S} 27:18b ליששכר {S} 27:19a {S} 27:19b לנפתלי {S} 27:20 {S} 27:21a {S} 27:16b לבנימן 27:22–24 {S} 27:25a {S} 27:25b ועל האצרות {S} 27:26 {S} 27:27a {S} 27:27b ועל שבכרמים {S} 27:28a {S} 27:28b ועל אצרות השמן {S} 27:29a {S} 27:29b ועל הקבר {S} 27:30a {S} 27:30b ועל האתנות {S} 27:31 {S} 27:32 {S} 27:33 {S} 27:34
  - {P} 28:10 {P} 28:11–19 {P} 28:20–21 {S} 29:1–9 {P} 29:10–19 {P} 29:20–25 {P} 29:26–20
- King Solomon (2 Chronicles 1–9): {P} 1:1–10 {S} 1:11–13 {P} 1:14–18;2:1 {P} 2:2–9 {S} 2:10–15 {P} 2:16–17;3:1–7 {S} 3:8–13 {S} 3:14 {S} 3:15 {S} 3:16–17 {S} 4:1 {S} 4:2–5 {S} 4:6 {S} 4:7 {S} 4:8 {S} 4:9–18 {S} 4:19–22;5:1a {S} 5:1b ויבא שלמה {P} 5:2–10 {P} 5:11–14 {S} 6:1–13 {P} 6:14a ויאמר {P} 6:14b–23 ה' אלהי ישראל {S} 6:24–25 {P} 6:26–27 {S} 6:28–31 {S} 6:32–40 {S} 6:41–42 {P} 7:1–4 {S} 7:5–6 {S} 7:7–11 {P} 7:12–22 {P} 8:1–9 {P} 8:10–11 {P} 8:12–16 {S} 8:17–18 {P} 9:1–12 {P} 9:13–21 {P} 9:22–24 {S} 9:25–31
- The Davidic Dynasty (2 Chronicles 10–36): {P} 10:1–5 {S} 10:6–11 {P} 10:12–16 {S} 10:17–18a {S} 10:18b והמלך רחבעם התאמץ {S} 10:19;11:1 {P} 11:2–4 {P} 11:5–12 {S} 11:13–23;12:1 {P} 12:2–4 {S} 12:5–8 {S} 12:9–12 {S} 12:13–14 {S} 12:15–16 {P} 13:1–3a {S} 13:3b וירבעם {S} 13:4–5 {P} 13:6–9 {S} 13:10–20 {P} 13:21–23 {P} 14:1–6 {P} 14:7a {S} 14:7b–10 ומבנימן {S} 14:11–14 {S} 15:1–2 {S} 15:3–7 {S} 15:8–9 {P} 15:10–19 {P} 16:1–5 {S} 16:6 {S} 16:7–14 {P} 17:1–6 {P} 17:7–11 {P} 17:12–14a {S} 17:14b עדנה השר {S} 17:15 {S} 17:16 {S} 17:17 {S} 17:18 {S} 17:19 {P} 18:1–17 {S} 18:18–22 {S} 18:23–34;19:1 {S} 19:2–11 {P} 20:1–13 {S} 20:14–30 {P} 20:31–37; 21:1–3 {P} 21:4–11 {P} 21:12–20; 22:1 {P} 22:2–12 {P} 23:1–11 {S} 23:12–13 {S} 23:14–15 {P} 23:16–21; 24:1–2 {S} 24:3–14 {P} 24:15–16 {P} 24:17–19 {S} 24:20–22 {P} 24:23–27 {P} 25:1–10 {S} 25:11–13 {P} 25:14–16 {P} 25:17–24 {P} 25:25–28;26:1–2 {P} 26:3–10 {S} 26:11–23 {P} 27:1–9 {P} 28:1–5 {S} 28:6–7 {S} 28:8 {S} 28:9–11 {S} 28:12–13 {S} 28:14–15 {P} 28:16–27 {P} 29:1–11 {P} 29:12a {S} 29:12b–13 ומן הגרשני {S} 29:14a {S} 29:14b–17 ומן בני ידותון {S} 29:18–19 {S} 29:20–26 {P} 29:27–30 {P} 29:31–36 {P} 30:1–9 {S} 30:10–19 {S} 30:20 {S} 30:21 {S} 30:22 {S} 30:23–24a {S} 30:24b–26 והשרים הרימו {S} 30:27 {P} 31:1 {P} 31:2 {S} 31:3–6 {S} 31:7 {S} 31:8 {P} 31:9–10 {S} 31:11–21 {P} 32:1–8 {P} 32:9–19 {S} 32:20 {S} 32:21–23 {P} 32:24–32 {P} 33:1–9 {P} 33:10–20 {P} 33:21–25 {P} 34:1–7 {P} 34:8–11 {S} 34:12–23 {S} 34:24–26a {S} 34:26b–28 כה אמר ה' אלהי ישראל {S} 34:29–33 {S} 35:1–2 {S} 35:3–6 {P} 35:7 {S} 35:8–18 {S} 35:19 {S} 35:20–22 {S} 35:23–24 {S} 35:25–27 {S} 36:1–4 {P} 36:5–8 {P} 36:9–10 {P} 36:11–14 {S} 36:15–17 {S} 36:18–21 {S} 36:22 {S} 36:23

== Songs with special layout ==
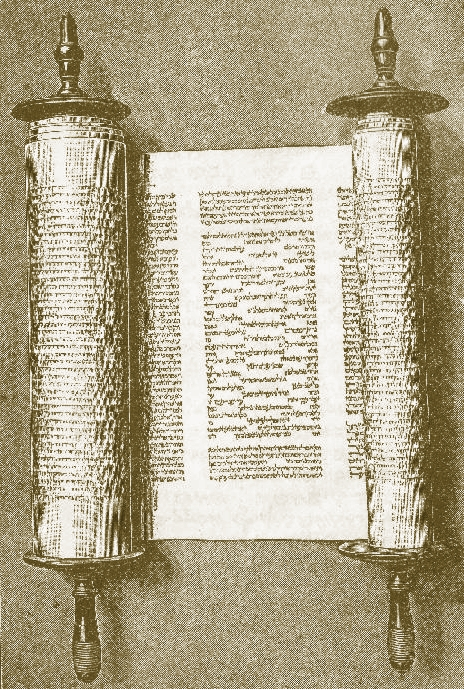
Image of a modern Torah scroll open to the Song of the Sea (Exodus 15:1–19) with special layout visible.

In addition to the common "open" and "closed" parshiot, the Masoretic scribal layout employs spaces in an elaborate way for prominent songs found within narrative books, as well as for certain lists. Each such "song" is formatted in its own exact way, though there are similarities between them. These sections include:

Torah

- Song of the Sea (Exodus 15:1–19)
- Song of Moses (Deuteronomy 32)

Nevi'im

- Canaanite Kings (Joshua 12:9–24)
- Song of Deborah (Judges 5)
- Song of David (II Samuel 22)

Ketuvim

- Song of the Seasons (Ecclesiastes 3:2–8)
- Haman's Sons (Esther 9:7–9)
- David's Champions (I Chronicles 11:26–47)
- Song of Assaf (I Chronicles 16:8–36)

The following sections discuss the layout and formatting of each of these songs in detail.

=== Haman's Sons (Esther) ===
The list of Haman's sons in a standard Scroll of Esther.

Esther 9:7–9 lists Haman's ten sons in three consecutive verses (three names in 7, three in 8, and four in 9). Each name is preceded by the Hebrew particle ואת. The {SONG} format for this list is as follows:

- The last word of verse 9:6 (איש) is purposely planned to be the first word in a new line (at the right margin). This word will begin the first line of text in {SONG} format.
- The first word of 9:7 (the Hebrew particle ואת) is written at the end of the first line in at the left margin. A large gap is thus left between איש and ואת, which forms a closed parashah division {S}.
- In the next ten lines of text, the ten names of the sons of Haman appear one after another in the beginning of each line at the right margin, beneath the word איש, while the word ואת appears at the end of each line text (left margin) until the final line. The 11th and final line of text ends with the first word of 9:10 (עשרת).
- There are thus a total of eleven lines of text in {SONG} format, each with a single word at the beginning of the line and a single word at the end. The first (right) column begins with the word איש and the names of Haman's 10 sons follow beneath it. The second (left) column has the word ואת ten times, and in the final row it has the first word of 9:10 (עשרת).

The {SONG} format described here originated in the typically narrow columns of the Tiberian Masoretic codices, in which a line of text containing only two words at opposite margins with a gap between them appears similar to a standard closed parashah. However, in many later scrolls the columns are much wider, such that lines with single words at opposite margins create a huge gap in the middle. In many scrolls these eleven lines are written in very large letters so that they form one full column of text in the megillah.

== See also ==
- Chapters and verses of the Bible
- List of Hebrew Bible manuscripts
- Lectionary – Book of approved scripture readings in Abrahamic religions
- Seder (Bible)
- Surah – Chapter of the Quran
- Weekly Torah portion – Portion of the Torah read during Jewish prayer

== Literature cited ==
Books and articles cited in the references to this article:

- Finfer, Pesah. Masoret HaTorah VehaNevi'im. Vilna, 1906 (Hebrew). Online text: High-resolution color scan at the Russian State Library; Internet Archive, DjVu at Wikimedia Commons, PDF at HebrewBooks.org
- Ganzfried, Shlomo. Keset HaSofer. Ungvár (Uzhhorod), 1835 (Hebrew). Online text (PDF)
- Goshen-Gottstein, Moshe. "The Authenticity of the Aleppo Codex." Textus 1 (1960):17-58.
- Goshen-Gottstein, Moshe. "A Recovered Part of the Aleppo Codex." Textus 5 (1966):53-59.
- Levy, B. Barry. Fixing God's Torah: The Accuracy of the Hebrew Bible text in Jewish Law. Oxford University Press, 2001.
- Ofer, Yosef. "M. D. Cassuto's Notes on the Aleppo Codex." Sefunot 19 (1989):277-344 (Hebrew). Online text (PDF)
- Ofer, Yosef. "The Aleppo Codex and the Bible of R. Shalom Shachna Yellin" in Rabbi Mordechai Breuer Festschrift: Collected Papers in Jewish Studies, ed. M. Bar-Asher, 1:295-353. Jerusalem, 1992 (Hebrew). Online text (PDF)
- Penkower, Jordan S. "Maimonides and the Aleppo Codex." Textus 9 (1981):39-128.
- Penkower, Jordan S. New Evidence for the Pentateuch Text in the Aleppo Codex. Bar-Ilan University Press: Ramat Gan, 1992 (Hebrew).
- Yeivin, Israel. "The Division into Sections in the Book of Psalms." Textus 7 (1969):76-102.
- Yeivin, Israel. Introduction to the Tiberian Masorah. Trans. and ed. E. J. Revell. Masoretic Studies 5. Missoula, Montana: Scholars Press, 1980.

Bible editions consulted (based on the Aleppo Codex):

1. Mossad Harav Kuk: Jerusalem, 1977–1982. Mordechai Breuer, ed.
2. Horev publishers: Jerusalem, 1996–98. Mordechai Breuer, ed.
3. Jerusalem Crown: The Bible of the Hebrew University of Jerusalem. Jerusalem, 2000. Yosef Ofer, ed. (under the guidance of Mordechai Breuer).
4. Jerusalem Simanim Institute (Feldheim Publishers), 2004.
5. Mikraot Gedolot Haketer, Bar-Ilan University Press, 1992–present.
6. Mechon Mamre, online version.

Bible editions consulted (based on the Leningrad Codex):

1. Biblia Hebraica Stuttgartensia. Deutsche Bibelgesellschaft: Stuttgart, 1984.
2. Adi publishers. Tel Aviv, 1986. Aharon Dotan, ed.
3. The JPS Hebrew-English Tanakh. Philadelphia, 1999.
4. Biblia Hebraica Quinta: General Introduction and Megilloth. Stuttgart: Deutsche Bibelgesellschaft, 2004 (BHQ).

Bible editions consulted (based on other traditions):

1. Koren Publishers: Jerusalem, 1962.
