= Aryeh Löb Priluk =

Polish Jewish author

Aryeh Judah Löb ben Chayim Priluk (Hebrew: אריה יהודה לייב בן חיים פרילוק) was a 17th-century Polish Jewish author.

He wrote a commentary on the Zohar from the parashot Shemot to Ḥukat, which was published, with the Sefer Yirah, in Berlin in 1724. The latter book also is credited to him.
