= Jerusalem Crown =

Printed edition of the Tanakh printed in Jerusalem in 2001

The Jerusalem Crown (Hebrew: כתר ירושלים, romanized: Keter Yerushalayim) is a printed edition of the Hebrew Bible printed in Jerusalem in 2000, and based on a manuscript commonly known as the Aleppo Codex.

The printed text consists of 874 pages of the Hebrew Bible, two pages setting forth both appearances of the Ten Commandments (from Exodus 20 and Deuteronomy 5, each showing the two different cantillations for private), and for public recitation, 23 pages briefly describing the research background and listing alternative readings (mostly from the Leningrad Codex, and almost all very slight differences in spelling or even pointing that do not change the meaning), a page of the blessings—the Ashkenazi, Sephardic and Yemenite versions—used before and after reading the Haftarah (the selection from the Prophets), a 9-page list of the annual schedule of the Haftarot readings according to the three traditions.

The text has been recognized as the official Bible of the Hebrew University of Jerusalem and the Knesset of Israel since 2001. Since its publication, it has been used to administer the oath of office to new presidents of the state of Israel. The text was edited according to the method of Mordechai Breuer under the supervision of Yosef Ofer, with additional proofreading and refinements since the Horev edition.

== The Aleppo Crown ==
The Jerusalem Crown is a printed edition of the Aleppo Codex, known in Hebrew as the כתר ארם צובה (Keter Aram Tsovah – "Crown of Aleppo"), a Masoretic Text worked up c. 929 and claimed to have been proofread and provided with vowel points and accents by the great Masoretic master, Aaron ben Moses ben Asher. During the December 1, 1947 anti-Jewish riot in Aleppo, two days after the United Nations voted to recommend partition of Mandatory Palestine into Jewish and Arab states, the Syrian Army firebombed the Central Synagogue of Aleppo and the Codex was originally reported as completely destroyed.

In fact, more than two-thirds of the Codex survived and was later smuggled into Israel c. 1957. At that time, only 294 pages arrived (later, one more page was donated) from an original total whose estimates run from 380 to 491 pages; possibly the lowest estimate is for the Bible text alone, and the higher estimates include appendices such as Masoretic notes, treatises on grammar, etc., such as are part of the Leningrad Codex. In general, most of the Torah was missing (the surviving text started at Deuteronomy 28:17), some pages were missing from the Prophets, and a substantial portion of the Ketuvim was missing (the surviving text ended at Song of Songs 3:11; completely lost were Ecclesiastes, Lamentations, Esther, Daniel, Ezra, and Nehemiah—as well as some pages in the midst of surviving books). Starting in 1986, the Israel Museum took ten years to remove a thousand years' accumulation of dirt, and even fungus, from the manuscript, and do other restorative work.

The Bible scholar Mordechai Breuer made a point of finding and collecting every known pre-1947 description of the Aleppo Codex (most of these were unpublished), including some surreptitious photographs, and used the descriptions of the surviving parts to verify the authenticity of the Codex and the descriptions of the missing parts to provide insights into the readings. To fill in remaining gaps he used the text of the Leningrad Codex, which was almost as distinguished and authoritative. He produced an edition of this reconstructed Bible for the Mossad Harav Kook, in Jerusalem, in 1989 and again (slightly revised) in 1998. Additionally, a photo-facsimile edition of the surviving pages of the Aleppo Codex was published by Nahum Ben-Zvi in 1976.

The pages smuggled into Israel were verified as the authentic Aleppo Codex, which owed its high reputation partly to the praise heaped upon it by Maimonides in the late 12th century, and partly also to its claim to have been personally proofread and marked with the vowel points and accents by the last of the great family of Masoretes, Aaron ben Moshe ben Asher, not only by matching the various descriptions which had been published, but also by matching descriptions by Maimonides in documents which had not yet been published.

As might be expected, the handwritten notes made by scholars who had been privileged to handle the Codex could not be as completely reliable as the manuscript itself. For example, a number of them had, on different occasions, copied down, supposedly word-for-word, the dedicatory colophon of the Codex (on a page now missing), which included some details of the manuscript's provenance—yet their different copies disagreed with each other.

However, the Aleppo Codex has many virtues. In its text of the Nevi'im, where it is nearly complete, it has fewer spelling errors than either the Leningrad Codex or the Cairo Codex. It has long been known that there are nine spelling differences (insignificant to meaning) between manuscripts of either Ashkenaz or Sefardic origin and manuscripts of Yemenite origin—and the Aleppo Codex sides with the Yemenite manuscripts on those differences. The Aleppo Codex conforms consistently to Maimonides's quotations, which the Leningrad Codex does not.

== Layout ==
Nahum Ben-Zvi, who conceived the idea of publishing the Jerusalem Crown, prepared the text of the Aleppo Codex for the press in a three-column layout, thus preserving the original layout of many of the most important Jewish manuscripts. The Jerusalem Crown was the first publication to return to this layout since the invention of the printing press. The project was made possible by the availability of computerized typesetting. The poetic passages in the Pentateuch and the Prophets are printed in the traditional layout (“half-bricks set over whole bricks”). The Song at the Sea (Exodus chapter 15) is presented as a single unit, on a separate page. The books of Job, Proverbs, and Psalms have been printed in a different layout; each verse of these books being presented in a single line and divided into two hemistichs (according to their poetic meter); this layout enables even readers unfamiliar with the biblical accentuation marks to read the text correctly. However, it also dictated a change in the typography of the pages compared with the rest of the Bible.

The majority of the text, which is prose, is printed in three columns to the page. Psalms, Proverbs, and most of Job is printed in two columns to the page. Chapter and verse numbers are added throughout, using Hebrew letters for the numerals.

== Font ==
A new typeface, "Jerusalem Crown", was designed especially for this Bible by Zvi Narkiss. The typeface was modeled on the original lettering of the Aleppo Codex. Considerable thought went into the design of this clear, very legible lettering.

It was published in the spring of 2001 in a large exhibit edition on behalf of the Aleppo Codex and in a general trade edition with a companion volume the following year. The edition is based on the latest scholarship concerning the biblical text, and the last version was edited by Mordechai Breuer, the recipient of the 1999 Israel Prize in Bible Scholarship.

The book was entirely set in print by computer, using a new computer program called "Tag", that could handle the letters, vowel points, accents, and the special characters. In previous editions worldwide, most of the text could be typeset by machine, but the special characters had to be positioned by hand. The new font had to be designed by Zvi Narkiss with a repertory of 138 characters - letters, vowel points, and accents, - and then special characters (certain letters are uncommonly large or small or superscript or inverted according to Masoretic tradition), many of them used only once. As with all printed Hebrew Bibles, there were about three million characters, including letters, vowels, accents, and other marks, to be typeset.

== Editorial considerations ==
Although the text of this edition was closely based on Breuer's edition, there were a very few departures where conscientious examination of the Codex itself indicated that Breuer had departed from the Aleppo text.

This edition was published in a popular edition, with a Companion Volume in Hebrew and English, in 2002 to great praise. However, there was also a smattering of scholarly criticism. For example, that the Masoretic notes were almost totally omitted and the printed edition showed only some of the original Codex's qere and ketiv notes and incompletely indicated the Codex's sedarim divisions, the printed edition lacked the rafe cantillation mark and the ornamentation that marks the beginning of each parsha. Certain bits of text had to be compared with the Codex itself, which was on display in the Israel Museum, because the photographs of the manuscript left some doubts. Certain changes were actively introduced to bring the Aleppo text more into conformity with modern printed Bibles; for example, half-vowels are rather frequently used in the Aleppo Codex but were omitted from the printed edition because contrary to the modern pronunciation of the text; a stress mark called a ga'ayot was rarely used in the Aleppo Codex but is more common in modern editions - so the Aleppo appearances of this mark are shown slightly differently than the many added to make the edition conform to modern usage. Additionally, the relatively few qere and ketiv notes that remain are put at the very bottom of a column, without any indication of the verse to which they are related, a style which becomes more confusing when a column has more than one such note. However these defects are considered microscopic in contrast to the overall high quality of this edition.

The printed Jerusalem Crown puts the books of the Ketuvim in the accustomed printed sequence, rather than the sequence of the manuscript Aleppo Codex. The printed Jerusalem Crown has them in this order: Psalms, Proverbs, Job, Song of Songs, Ruth, Lamentations, Ecclesiastes, Esther Daniel Ezra, Nehemiah, and first and second Chronicles. The manuscript Aleppo Codex had them ordered: Chronicles, Psalms, Job, Proverbs, Ruth, Song of Songs, followed by (according to notes, because these are now lost) Ecclesiastes, Lamentations, Esther, Daniel, Ezra, and Nehemiah.
