= Mordechai Breuer =

German-born Israeli Orthodox rabbi

Rabbi Mordechai Breuer
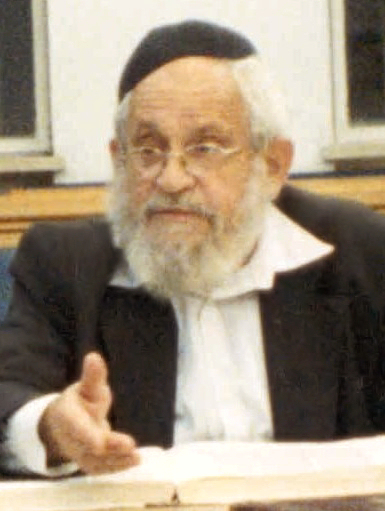

Personal life
- Born: May 14, 1921 Karlsruhe, Baden, Germany
- Died: February 24, 2007 (aged 85) Jerusalem, Israel
- Parent(s): Samson Breuer, Else Leah Neuenbürg

Religious life
- Religion: Judaism
- Denomination: Orthodox
- Residence: Bayit Ve-Gan, Jerusalem

Mordechai Breuer (Hebrew: מָרְדְּכַי בְּרוֹיֶאר; May 14, 1921 – February 24, 2007) was a German-born Israeli Orthodox rabbi. He was one of the world's leading experts on Tanakh (Hebrew Bible), and especially of the text of the Aleppo Codex.

His first cousin was the historian also named Mordechai Breuer. Breuer was a great-grandson of Rabbi Samson Raphael Hirsch.

== Biography ==
Mordechai Breuer was born in 1921 to Samson and Else Leah Breuer. His paternal grandfather was Rabbi Dr. Salomon Breuer, son-in-law of Rabbi Samson Raphael Hirsch. His mother died while Mordechai was a young child, and his father then married Agatha Jeidel. At age twelve, he and his family emigrated to then-British Palestine. There, he studied at Yeshivat Hebron and Yeshivat Kol Torah. He taught Tanakh in several yeshivot and schools in Israel beginning in 1947, such as Yeshivat Har Etzion. In 1999 he was awarded the Israel Prize for original Rabbinical Literature. He also received an honorary doctorate by the Hebrew University of Jerusalem.

== Literary contribution ==
Breuer's position was that only a single correct text of Tanakh existed; any variants from this authoritative edition were therefore errors. Breuer's approach to establishing this correct text and punctuation of Tanakh was at first eclectic, based on several early manuscripts (and the Venice edition of Mikra'ot Gedolot) and their masoretic notes, as well as notes from Wolf Heidenheim and Minḥat Shai (Rabbi Solomon Norzi). He later gained access to the Aleppo Codex (dating from the tenth century) and found it to match almost perfectly with his work, supporting his thesis of only one correct edition. His edition was first published by Mossad Harav Kook in the Da'at Mikra series and as its own volume. It was republished in 1998 and 2001 by different publishers. The last is the modern edition of the Tanakh known as Keter Yerushalayim (Hebrew: כתר ירושלים, lit. 'Jerusalem Crown'), referred to in English as the Jerusalem Codex. It is based graphically on the Aleppo Codex, and is now the official Tanakh of the Hebrew University of Jerusalem and of the Israeli Knesset.

He was known for developing Shitat Habechinot ("the aspect approach") which suggests that differing styles and internal tensions in the Biblical text represent different "voices" of God or Torah, which cannot be merged without losing their identity. According to Breuer, God wrote the Torah from "multiple perspectives … each one constituting truth, [for] it is only the combination of such truths that gives expression to the absolute truth." If applied, this approach would provide an alternative framework to the documentary hypothesis, which maintains that the Torah was written by multiple authors.

In his two volume book Pirkei Moadot (1986), Breuer discusses twenty eight topics, mostly holidays like Shabbat, Pesach, Shavuot, and Hanukkah. The majority of the essays address the peshat or simple understanding of the Biblical text (written law) and attempt to clarify how it corresponds with the halakha or rabbinic law. A few of the essays address issues of oral law. For example, in one of his essays on Pesach, he discusses why and how the order of the Pesach Seder has changed since the destruction of the Temple. Originally, the korban Pesach was eaten after saying kiddush and drinking the first cup of wine. He explains how and why the Seder developed as presented in the Haggadah nowadays. In the introduction, he articulates his methodology for ascertaining the peshat of the Biblical text and demonstrates this method in several of the essays.

He authored five other works: One on the Aleppo Codex, one on Taamei Hamikra, Pirkei Bereishit, Pirkei Mikraot, and Pirkei Yeshayahu. Breuer also translated Samson Raphael Hirsch's Commentary on the Pentateuch that was written in German into Hebrew together with his cousin Mordechai Breuer.

== Awards ==
- In 1984, Breuer was awarded the Bialik Prize for Jewish thought.
- In 1999, he was awarded the Israel Prize, for Rabbinical literature - original Torah research.

== See also ==
- List of Israel Prize recipients
- List of Bialik Prize recipients
