= Jewish commentaries on the Bible =

Commentaries on the Hebrew Bible from a Jewish perspective

Jewish commentaries on the Bible are biblical commentaries of the Hebrew Bible (the Tanakh) from a Jewish perspective. Translations into Aramaic and English, and some universally accepted Jewish commentaries with notes on their method of approach and also some modern translations into English with notes are listed.

== Earliest printing ==
The complete Tanakh in Hebrew, with commentaries by Rashi, Radak, Ramban, and Ralbag was printed in 1517 by Daniel Bomberg and edited by Felix Pratensis under the name Mikraot Gedolot.

The Tanakh was handed down in manuscript form along with a method of checking the accuracy of the transcription known as mesorah. Many codices containing the Masoretic Text were gathered by Jacob ben Hayyim ibn Adonijah and were used to publish an accurate text. It was published by Daniel Bomberg in 1525. Later editions were edited with the help of Elia Levita. Various editions of Mikraot Gedolot are still in print.

== Translations ==
=== Targum ===
A Targum is a translation of the Bible into Aramaic. The classic Targumim are Targum Onkelos on the Chumash (a Torah in printed form), Targum Jonathan on Nevi'im (the Prophets), and a fragmentary Targum Yerushalmi. There is no standard Aramaic translation of the Ketuvim.

==== Targum Onkelos ====
Targum Onkelos is the most often consulted literal translation of the Bible with a few exceptions. Figurative language is usually not translated literally but is explained (e.g., Gen. 49:25; Ex. 15:3, 8, 10; 29:35). Geographical names are often replaced by those current at a later time (e.g., Gen. 10:10; Deut. 3:17).

According to the Talmud, the Torah and its translation into Aramaic were given to Moses on Mount Sinai, because Egyptian slaves spoke Aramaic. After the Babylonian exile, the Targum was completely forgotten. Onkelos, a Roman convert to Judaism, was able to reconstruct the original Aramaic. Saadia Gaon disagrees and says the Aramaic of Onkelos was never a spoken language. He believed that Onkelos's Aramaic was an artificial construct, a combination of Eastern and Western dialects of Aramaic.

The major commentary on Targum Onkelos is Netinah LaGer ("a gift to the Convert" נתינה לגר) written by Nathan Marcus Adler.

==== Targum Jonathan ====
According to some scholars, Targum Jonathan's Chumash was not written by Jonathan ben Uzziel and thus they refer to it instead as Targum Pseudo-Jonathan. According to the Encyclopaedia Judaica, internal evidence shows that it was written sometime between the 7th and 14th centuries CE. For example, Ishmael's wife's name is translated into Aramaic as Fatima (who was Mohammed's daughter) and therefore Targum Pseudo-Jonathan must have been written after Mohammed's birth. The classic Hebrew commentators would turn this argument around, and say that Mohammed's daughter was named after Ismael's wife. Both sides will agree, however, that stylistically Jonathan's commentary on the Chumash is very different from the commentary on Nevi’im. The Targum Jonathan on Nevi’im is written in a very terse style, similar to Onkelos on Chumash, but on the average Targum Jonathan on Chumash is almost twice as verbose. Adler produced a commentary here also - Ahavat Yonatan ("Jonathan's Love" אהבת יונתן).

==== Targum Yerushalmi ====
The Jerusalem Targum exists only in fragmentary form. It translates a total of approximately 850 verses, phrases, and words. No one knows who wrote it. Some speculate that it was a printers error. The printer saw a manuscript headed with "TY" and assumed it was a Targum Yerushalmi when actually it was an early version of Targum Yonathan. Others speculate that it was written by a R. Yosef or R. Hoshea (Yihoshua).

== Commentaries ==
=== Methodology ===
- For comparing one verse to another, see Talmudical hermeneutics
- For understanding one verse, see Pardes (Jewish exegesis)

=== Rishonim (1000–1600) ===
- Rashi (Shlomo Yitzchaki; 1040–1106) is the most influential Jewish exegete of all time. He is the preeminent expounder of Peshat. Rashi wrote, "I, however, am only concerned with the plain sense of Scripture and with such Aggadot that explain the words of Scripture in a manner that fits in with them." There have also been many super-commentaries written on Rashi's basic commentary, including:
  - Be'er Mayim Chaim, by Chaim ben Betzalel (1515–1588), the older brother of Judah Loew ben Bezalel
  - Amar Nekeh, by Obadiah ben Abraham Bartenura (c. 1440–1516), a leading rabbi of Italy and Jerusalem, best known for his commentary on the Mishnah
  - Divrei David, by David HaLevi Segal (1586–1667), a Polish rabbinical authority known as the Taz for his classic commentary on the Shulchan Aruch
  - Gur Aryeh al haTorah, by the Judah Loew ben Bezalel (1526–1609), known for this work and his fundamental works on Jewish philosophy and mysticism
  - Maskil le-David, by David Pardo (1710–1792)
  - Sefer HaMizrachi, by Elijah Mizrachi (1450–1525), which itself spawned multiple supercommentaries such as Yeri'ot Shlomo by Solomon Luria and Leshon Arummim by Barzillai ben Baruch Jabez
  - Nachalas Yaakov
  - Sefer Ha-zikaron, by Abraham Lévy-Bacrat, who lived through the Spanish Expulsion of 1492
  - Siftei Chachamim, by Shabbethai Bass, which analyzes other supercommentaries on Rashi and is considered important enough that a shortened version, Ikkar Siftei Chachamim, is often printed with the commentary of Rashi
- Rashbam (Samuel ben Meir; 1085–1158) was the grandson of Rashi and the brother of Rabbeinu Tam.
- Tobiah ben Eliezer (11th century Greece) was a Romaniote scholar and paytan, who wrote the Leḳaḥ Ṭov or Pesiḳta Zuṭarta, a midrashic commentary on the Pentateuch and the Five Megillot. The Talmudic passages he cites in connection with the halakhot are often interpreted according to his judgment and are different from Rashi's. Like many other Biblical commentators, he translates certain words into the language of the country where he lived, namely, Greek.
- Abraham ibn Ezra (1092–1167) was a contemporary of the Rashbam. His commentary on Chumash was reprinted under the name Sefer HaYashar. He separates the literal meaning of a biblical verse from the traditional meaning, upon which the halacha is based, and from the homiletic meaning drush. He explains that the traditional and homiletic meanings do not attempt to imply meaning to the verse; they use the verse only as a mnemonic.
- David Kimhi (1160–1235) followed the methodology of Ibn Ezra. He deemphasised homiletics and emphasised the Talmudic interpretations when they reached his standard of peshat. He strove for clarity and readability in his exegesis, as opposed to his predecessors, who emphasised conciseness. His commentaries are said to have "a remarkably modern flavor" Of the Chumash, only Radak on Breishit survives.
- Nachmanides (Moses ben Nahman, or Ramban; 1194–1270) was the first biblical commentator to introduce kabbalistic concepts into his exegesis. He differed from the Zohar in that he believed that the transcendent nature of God is absolutely unknowable by man, whereas the school of Zoharists believed that transcendence is comprehensible through revelation, ecstasy, and in the contemplation of history. Ramban expressed his views through the Sod aspect of his commentary. In his commentary, he also expressed his belief that all mitzvot had a comprehensible and rational explanation.
- Jacob ben Asher (1270–1340) was the author of the Arba'ah Turim, a precursor of the Shulchan Aruch. Jacob ben Asher wrote a commentary on the Torah in which he anthologised the Pshat element of his predecessors. At the beginning of each section, he wrote, as brain teasers, some explanations using Remez. These were gathered and printed under the name Baal HaTurim. The Baal HaTurim is printed in all modern editions of Mikraot Gedolot. The full commentary titled Perush ha-Tur ha-Arokh al ha-Torah was published in Jerusalem in 1981.
- Gersonides (Levi ben Gershon, or the Ralbag; 1288–1344) based his exegesis on three principles:
  1. What can be learned through the nine principles (he believed that four of them were not allowed to be used in post-Talmudic times).
  2. Every story in the Bible comes to teach us ethical, religious, and philosophical ideas.
  3. Most of what we call Remez can be clearly understood by resorting to exact translation and grammatical analysis. He also condemned allegorical explanations.
- Hezekiah ben Manoah (13th century France) based his kabbalistic commentary, Chizkuni, primarily on Rashi, but also used up to 20 other sources, including Dunash ben Labrat.
- Isaac Abarbanel (1437–1508), in his commentary on Tanach, before each section, would list a series of questions exploring the conceptual problems in the section from both exegetical and theological perspectives. His commentary would attempt to answer these questions through Pshat and Medrash. He distinguished between Medrashim, which was part of Mesorah, and those that were mere opinions and could be safely disregarded.

=== Acharonim (1600–present) ===
- Me'am Lo'ez 1730–1777
- Metsudot 18th century – A commentary on Neviim and Ketuvim by Rabbi David Altschuler. When he died, his son Yechiel completed it and divided it into two sections: Metsudat Zion, a glossary of difficult words, and Metsudat David, a restatement of difficult ideas.
- Malbim (Meir Leibush ben Yehiel Michel Wisser; 1809–1879) – his exegesis is based on several assumptions:
  1. There are no extra words or synonyms in the Bible. Every word is meaningful.
  2. Drush is as explicit as Pshat is, except that Drush has different rules of usage and syntax.
  3. The basis of the whole of the Oral law is explicit in the Bible, either through Pshat or Drush. The only exception is when the Oral Law states that the law is not found in the Bible and is designated as Halacha l'Moshe m'Sinai.
- Samson Raphael Hirsch (1808–1888) was a German rabbi during the early modern period. His commentary focuses on the grammar and structure of the language of the Tanakh to facilitate understanding the laws being given. His commentary includes the Five Books of Moses and other various parts of the Tanakh.
- Torah Temimah (1860–1941) – Baruch Epstein was a bank worker by profession who devoted all of his extra time to Jewish studies. To write the Torah Temimah, he gathered excerpts from the Talmud and other sources of the Oral Law and arranged them in the order of the verses of the Written Law to which they refer. He then wove the excerpts into a commentary on the Bible and annotated each excerpt with critical notes and insights.
- Nechama Leibowitz (1905–1997) – In the early 1940s, Leibowitz began mailing study sheets on the weekly Torah reading to her students throughout the world. The study sheets included essays on the weekly portion, source notes, and questions. She encouraged her students to send their answers to her for correction. Soon, she sent out thousands of sheets and corrected hundreds of answer sheets weekly. These study sheets were collected and published in English and Hebrew in the mid-1960s and are still in print. "Her specific collection of sources was based solely on each one's contribution to understanding peshat and to the revelation of the significance of that text."

==== 20th and 21st century ====
- The Soncino Books of the Bible covers the whole Tanakh in fourteen volumes, published by the Soncino Press. The first volume to appear was Psalms in 1945, and the last was Chronicles in 1952. The editor was Rabbi Abraham Cohen. Each volume contains the Hebrew and English texts of the Hebrew Bible in parallel columns, with a running commentary below them.
- Judaica Press is an Orthodox Jewish publishing house. They have published a set of 24 bilingual Hebrew-English volumes of Mikraot Gedolot for Nevi'im and Ketuvim, published as Books of the Prophets and Writings. As in traditional Mikraot Gedolot, the Hebrew text includes the Masoretic Text, the Aramaic Targum, and several classic rabbinic commentaries. The English translations, by Avroham Yoseif Rosenberg (also: Abraham Joseph Rosenberg), include a translation of the Biblical text, Rashi's commentary, and a summary of rabbinic and modern commentaries. It is available online as JavaScript-dependent HTML document with Rashi's commentary at chabad.org – The Complete Jewish Bible with Rashi Commentary (in Hebrew and English).
- The Living Torah, by Aryeh Kaplan, his best-known work, is a widely used, scholarly (and user-friendly) translation of the Torah into English. It is noteworthy for its detailed index, thorough cross-references, extensive footnotes with maps and diagrams, and research on realia, flora, fauna, and geography. The footnotes also indicate differences in interpretation between the classic commentators. It was one of the first translations structured around the parshiyot, the traditional division of the Torah text. The Living Torah was later supplemented by The Living Nach on Nevi'im (two volumes: "The Early Prophets" and "The Latter Prophets") and Ketuvim ("Sacred Writings" in one volume). These were prepared posthumously following Rabbi Kaplan's format by others, including Yaakov Elman.
- Mesorah Publications, Ltd. is a Haredi Orthodox Jewish publishing company based in Brooklyn, New York. Its general editors are Rabbis Nosson Scherman and Meir Zlotowitz. They publish the Artscroll prayerbooks and Bible commentaries. In 1993, they published The Chumash: The Stone Edition, a Torah translation and commentary arranged for liturgical use. It is popularly known as The ArtScroll Chumash or The Stone Chumash and has since become the best-selling English-Hebrew Torah translation and commentary in the U.S. and other English-speaking countries. They have issued a series of Tanakh commentaries on the rest of the Tanakh. Their translations have been criticized by a few Modern Orthodox scholars (e.g., B. Barry Levy and some non-Orthodox scholars) as mistranslating the Bible. The dispute comes about because the editors at Mesorah Publications consciously attempt to present a translation of the text based on rabbinic tradition and medieval biblical commentators such as Rashi, as opposed to a literal translation.
- Koren Publishers Jerusalem is a Jerusalem-based publishing company founded in 1961. It publishes various editions of The Koren Tanakh, originally created by master typographer and company founder Eliyahu Koren. The Koren Tanakh is the official Tanakh accepted by the Chief Rabbinate of Israel for synagogue Haftarah reading and the Bible upon which Israel's president is sworn into office. Koren offers a Hebrew/English edition with translation by biblical and literary scholar, Harold Fisch, and is currently at work on a Hebrew/English edition with translation and commentary by Rabbi Jonathan Sacks, along with at least three other series of commentaries that are in progress. Koren has also completed publishing, in both Hebrew and English, the Bible commentary of Rabbi Adin Steinsaltz.
- Da'at Miqra is a series of Hebrew-language biblical commentaries published by the Jerusalem-based Rav Kook Institute. Its editors included the late Prof. Yehuda Elitzur of Bar-Ilan University, Bible scholar Amos Hakham, Sha’ul Yisra’eli, Mordechai Breuer and Yehuda Kiel. The commentary combines a traditional rabbinic outlook with the findings of modern research. The editors have sought to present an interpretation based primarily upon Peshat – the direct, literal reading of the text – as opposed to Drash. They do so by incorporating geographic references, archaeological findings, and textual analysis. It is in Hebrew; several volumes have been translated into English, and more are planned.
- Da'as Sofrim on Tanach is a 20-volume work by Chaim Dov Rabinowitz encompassing the whole of the Tanakh. Based on the Rishonim, he spent more than 60 years compiling this massive commentary, which is used for study by many talmidei chachamim and educators throughout the world.
- The Gutnick Edition Chumash, by Rabbi Chaim Miller, is a translation that incorporates Rabbi Menachem Mendel Schneerson's – the Rebbe's - "novel interpretation" of Rashi's commentary. This "Toras Menachem" commentary is culled from the Rebbe's lectures and notes on classical and Hassidic interpretations. It also includes mystical insights called "Sparks of Chassidus", a summary of the mitzvot found in each Parashah according to Sefer ha-Chinuch. It is unique in its presentation of "Classic Questions" - the questions underlying more than one hundred Torah commentaries.
- A second Lubavitch Chumash, Kehot Publication Society's Torah Chumash (the "LA Chumash") offers an Interpolated English translation and commentary - "woven" together – again based on Rashi, and the works of the Rebbe. The Chumash also includes a fully vocalized Hebrew text of Rashi's commentary. The Editor-in-Chief is Rabbi Moshe Wisnefsky with contributing editors: Rabbis Baruch Kaplan, Betzalel Lifshitz, Yosef Marcus and Dov Wagner. Additional Features include "Chasidic Insights" and "Inner Dimensions", Chronological charts, topic titles, illustrations, diagrams and maps. Each sidra is prefaced by an overview, a study of the name of each sidra and its relevance to the respective text.
- An open Orthodox Yeshiva in New York, Yeshivat Chovevei Torah, recently started a new Bible series, Yeshivat Chovevei Torah Tanakh Companion. The first volume out is Yeshivat Chovevei Torah Tanakh Companion to The Book of Samuel: Bible Study in the Spirit of Open and Modern Orthodoxy, edited by Nathaniel Helfgot and Shmuel Herzfeld.
- JPS Tanakh Commentary. The Jewish Publication Society, known in the Jewish community as JPS, completed a long-term, large-scale project to complete a modern Interdenominational Jewish commentary on the entire Hebrew Bible. It was released for sale in 1985; as of 2017 it is now available free online. Unlike the Judaica Press and Soncino commentaries, the JPS commentaries are a detailed line-by-line commentary of every passage, in every book of the Bible. The amount of the JPS commentaries are almost an order of magnitude larger than those found in the earlier Orthodox English works. They initially produced volumes on all five books of the Torah, the Haftarot, and the books of Jonah, Esther, Ecclesiastes, Ruth, and Song of Songs. Although not a book of the Bible, JPS has also issued a commentary volume on the Haggadah. Next planned are volumes on Lamentations, Joshua, Judges, Samuel (2 volumes), & Psalms (5 volumes).
- A major Bible commentary now in use by Conservative Judaism is Etz Hayim: Torah and Commentary. Its production involved the collaboration of the Rabbinical Assembly, the United Synagogue of Conservative Judaism, and the Jewish Publication Society. The Hebrew and English bible text is the New JPS version. It contains a number of commentaries, written in English, on the Torah which run alongside the Hebrew text and its English translation, and it also contains a number of essays on the Torah and Tanakh in the back of the book. It contains three types of commentary: (1) the p'shat, which discusses the literal meaning of the text; this has been adapted from the first five volumes of the JPS Bible Commentary; (2) the d'rash, which draws on Talmudic, Medieval, Chassidic, and Modern Jewish sources to expound on the deeper meaning of the text; and (3) the halacha l'maaseh – which explains how the text relates to current Jewish law.
- Leonard S. Kravitz and Kerry Olitzky have authored a series of Tanakh commentaries. Their commentaries draw on classical Jewish works such as the Mishnah, Talmud, Targums, the midrash literature, and also the classical Jewish bible commentators such as Gersonides, Rashi and Abraham ibn Ezra. They take into account modern scholarship; while these books take note of some findings of higher textual criticism, these are not academic books using source criticism to deconstruct the Tanakh. Rather, their purpose is educational, and Jewishly inspirational, and as such do not follow the path of classical Reform scholars, or the more secular projects such as the Anchor Bible series. The books also add a layer of commentary by modern-day rabbis. These books are published by the Union for Reform Judaism. Commentaries in this series now include Jonah, Lamentations, Ruth, the Song of Songs, Ecclesiastes, and Proverbs.
- The Jewish Study Bible, from Oxford University Press, edited by Adele Berlin and Marc Zvi Brettler. The English bible text is the New JPS version. A new English commentary has been written for the entire Hebrew Bible drawing on both traditional rabbinic sources, and the findings of modern-day higher textual criticism.
- There is much overlap between non-Orthodox Jewish Bible commentary, and the non-sectarian and inter-religious Bible commentary found in the Anchor Bible Series. Originally published by Doubleday, and now by Yale University Press, this series began in 1956. Having initiated a new era of cooperation among scholars in biblical research, over 1,000 scholars—representing Jewish, Catholic, Protestant, Muslim, secular, and other traditions—have now contributed to the project.
- The Torah: A Women's Commentary, Edited by Tamara Cohn Eskenazi and Andrea Weiss. URJ Press (December 10, 2007). This volume "gives dimension to the women's voices in our tradition. Under Editor Dr. Tamara Cohn Eskenazi's skillful leadership, this commentary provides insight and inspiration for all who study Torah: men and women, Jew and non-Jew. As Dr. Eskenazi has eloquently stated, 'we want to bring the women of the Torah from the shadow into the limelight, from their silences into speech, from the margins to which they have often been relegated to the center of the page – for their sake, for our sake and for our children's sake.'"
- The Women's Torah Commentary: New Insights from Women Rabbis on the 54 Weekly Torah Portions Edited by Rabbi Elyse Goldstein, Jewish Lights Publishing (September 2008). From the Jewish Lights website: "In this groundbreaking book, more than 50 women rabbis come together to offer us inspiring insights on the Torah, in a week-by-week format. Included are commentaries by the first women ever ordained in the Reform, Reconstructionist and Conservative movements, and by many other women across these denominations who serve in the rabbinate in a variety of ways."

== See also ==
- List of biblical commentaries
- Chazal
- Exegesis
- Rabbinic literature
- Talmudical hermeneutics
- Yeshiva § Torah and Bible study
