= Eliah ben Samuel ben Parnes of Stephanow =

Bulgarian Jewish Biblical commentator

Eliah ben Samuel ben Parnes of Stephanow (Hebrew: אליה בן שמואל בן פרנס השטיפאני, fl. 15th century) was a Bulgarian Jewish Biblical commentator and poet.

Eliah lived in the second half of the fifteenth century, probably first at Widdin, and later at Constantinople. He maintained a correspondence on scientific subjects with Moses Capsali, Elijah Mizraḥi, and other Talmudical authorities. In 1468 or 1469, he wrote a grammatical and allegorical commentary on the Pentateuch, entitled Sefer ha-Zikkaron ('The Book of Memory'). The commentary is followed by poetical pieces composed by the author, twelve of which are liturgical poems.
