= Mikraot Gedolot =

Edition of the Hebrew Bible

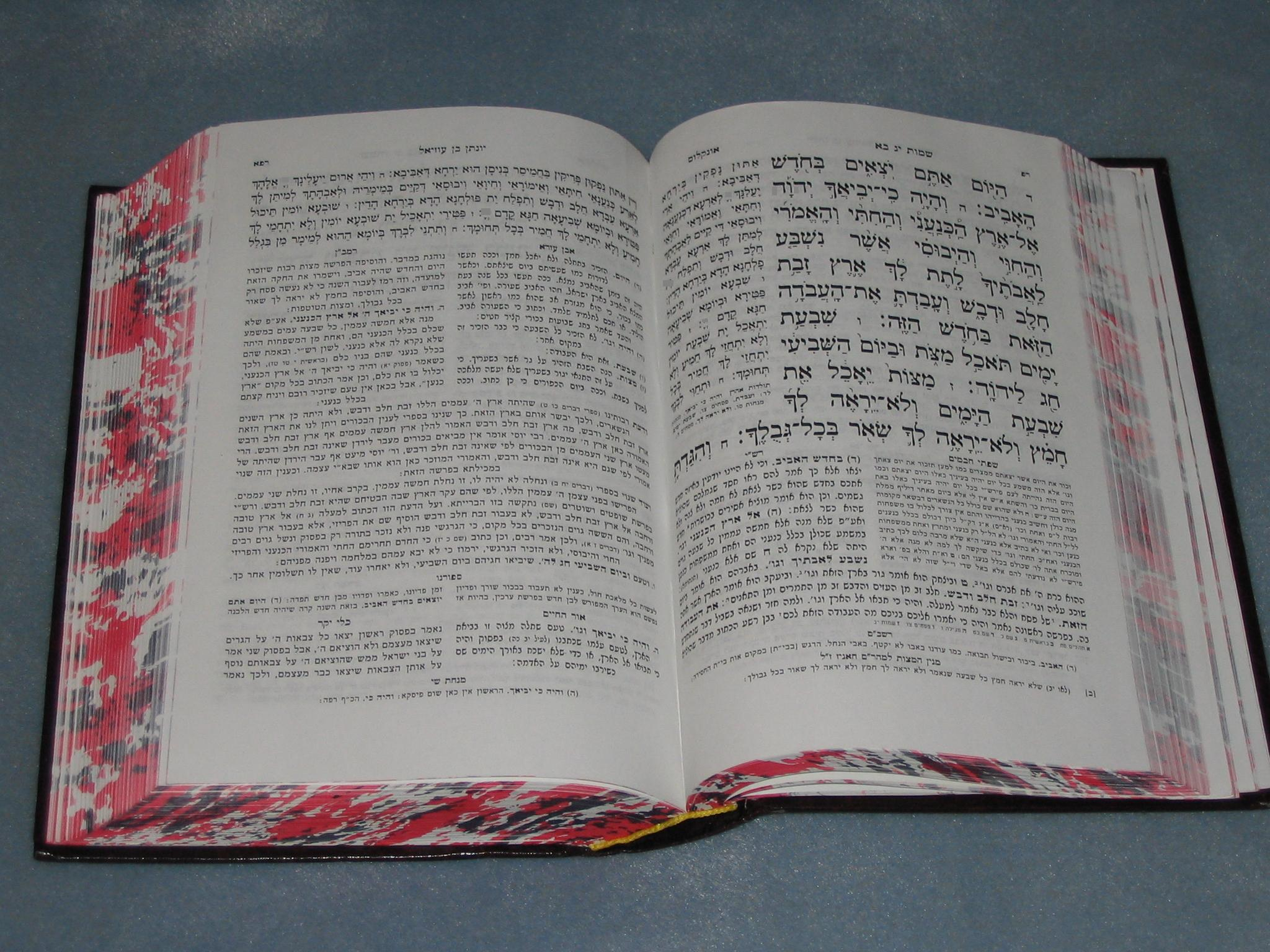
A page of a modern Mikraot Gedolot Chumash. The text is the block of large, bold letters; adjacent to it is the Targum Onkelos with Rashi's commentary below with the related supercommentary Siftei Chachamim adjacent. Nachmanides, Abraham ibn Ezra, and Obadiah ben Jacob Sforno are on the facing page; other commentaries and references are in the margins.

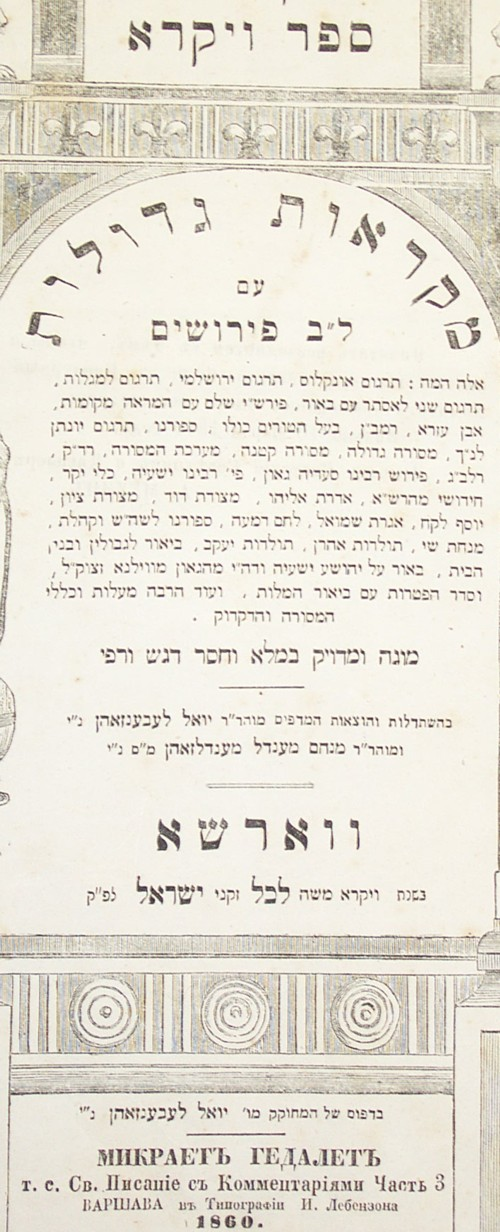
Vayikra – The Book of Leviticus, Warsaw edition,1860, title page

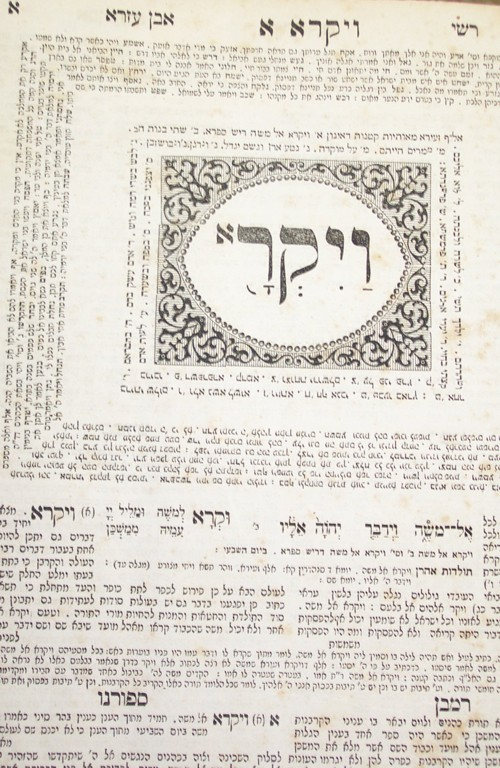
Book of Leviticus, Warsaw edition, 1860, Page 1

A Mikraot Gedolot (Hebrew: מקראות גדולות, lit. 'Great Scriptures'), often called a "Rabbinic Bible" in English, is an edition of the Hebrew Bible that generally includes three distinct elements:

- The Masoretic Text in its letters, niqqud (vocalisation marks), and cantillation marks
- A Targum or Aramaic translation
- Jewish commentaries on the Bible; most common and prominent are medieval commentaries in the peshat tradition

Numerous editions of the Mikraot Gedolot have been and continue to be published.

== Commentaries ==
In addition to Targum Onkelos and Rashi's commentary, the standard Jewish commentaries on the Hebrew Bible, the Mikraot Gedolot will include numerous other commentaries. For instance, the Romm publishing house edition of the Mikraot Gedolot contains the following additional commentaries:

- Targum Jonathan
- Targum Pseudo-Jonathan
- Rashbam
- Tosafot on the Torah (Daat Zekenim)
- Chaim ibn Attar (Or Hachaim)
- Abraham ibn Ezra
- David Kimhi
- Nachmanides
- Gersonides
- Jacob ben Asher (Ba'al Haturim)
- Obadiah ben Jacob Sforno
- Shabbethai Bass (Siftei Hakhamim)
- Obadiah of Bertinoro (Emer Neka)
- Shlomo Ephraim Luntschitz (Kli Yakar)
- Isaac Abarbanel
- Joseph Kara

Newer editions often include Baruch Epstein's Torah Temimah and other medieval commentaries, or more modern commentaries such as Malbim. Special editions exist of supercommentaries on Rashi or commentaries and targumim not included in older editions. Bomberg also included the Masoretic notes on the biblical text, but no modern edition does.

== Editions of the Bomberg Mikraot Gedolot ==
First published in 1516–17 by Daniel Bomberg in Venice, the Mikraot Gedolot was edited by Felix Pratensis, a Jew converted to Christianity. The second edition was edited by the Masoretic scholar Jacob ben Hayyim ibn Adonijah in 1525. The four-volume set included the Masoretic text of the Torah (Hebrew Pentateuch) with accompanying commentaries (many of which had never previously been printed), a targum (Aramaic translation), the haftarot and the Five Megillot. All of its elements (Masoretic Text, Targum and commentaries) were based upon the manuscripts that ben Hayyim had at hand (although he did not always have access to the best ones according to some, Ginsburg and some others argued that it was a good representation of the Aaron ben Moses ben Asher text). The commentaries included by Bomberg and placed side-by-side on thee page covered a wide geographical, chronological and methodological gamut, featuring the text of the Torah the interpretive works of Rashi and Targum Onkelos, a translation of the Torah written in Jewish Babylonian Aramaic and dating back to the second century CE. Other commentators included were Rashbam, Abraham ibn Ezra, Nachmanides (Ramban), David Kimhi (Radak) and Obadiah ben Jacob Sforno. Bomberg's Mikraot Gedolot became a model for future printings of the Hebrew Bible.

The first printing of Bomberg's Mikraot Gedolot, though hailed as an extraordinary achievement, was riddled with thousands of technical errors. Objections were also raised by the Jewish readership, based on the fact that the very first printing of the Mikraot Gedolot was edited by Felix Pratensis. Furthermore, Bomberg, a Christian, had requested an imprimatur from Pope Leo X.. Such facts were not compatible with the supposed Jewish nature of the work; Bomberg had to produce a fresh edition under the direction of acceptable Jewish editors. This second edition served as the textual model for nearly all later editions until modern times. Concerning the biblical text, many of the errors that remained in ben Hayyim's work were corrected years later by Menahem Lonzano and Jedidiah Norzi.}

The Mikraot Gedolot of Ben Hayyim served as the source for the Hebrew Bible translation in the King James Version in 1611 and the Spanish Reina Valera translation, and was used as a reference for other subsequent Christian translations of the Old Testament.

A scholarly reprint of the 1525 Ben-Hayyim Venice edition was published in 1972 by Moshe Goshen-Gottstein.

== Recent printed editions ==
Many editions are reprints of, or based on, late nineteenth century Eastern European editions, which are based on the Ben Hayyim edition.

Newer editions of Mikraot Gedolot have been published based on manuscript evidence, principally (for the biblical text and Masoretic notes) the Keter Aram Tzova, the manuscript of the Tanakh kept by the Jews of Aleppo. These also have improved texts of the commentaries based on ancient manuscripts. Four of these editions are:

- the Bar Ilan Mikraot Gedolot ha-Keter, ed. Menaḥem Cohen, complete in 21 volumes: Genesis (2 vols.), Exodus (2 vols.), Leviticus, Numbers, Deuteronomy, Joshua & Judges (1 vol.), Samuel, Kings, Isaiah, Jeremiah, Ezekiel, Minor Prophets, Psalms (2 vols.), Proverbs, Job, Five Megillot (1 vol.), Daniel-Ezra-Nehemiah, and Chronicles.
- Torat Hayim, published by Mossad Harav Kook, with 15 volumes thus far: Torah, Psalms, Proverbs, and five Megillot, plus several non-biblical texts.
- Chorev Mikraot Gedolot, published by Hotzaat Chorev (now complete).
- Mikraot Gedolot, published by Artscroll Mesorah

== Sources ==
- Menaḥem Cohen, "Introduction to the Haketer edition," in Mikra'ot Gedolot Haketer: A revised and augmented scientific edition of "Mikra'ot Gedolot" based on the Aleppo Codex and Early Medieval MSS (Bar-Ilan University Press, 1992).
