= Bragadin-Giustiniani dispute =

Dispute between rival printers Bragadini and Giustiniani over printing rights

The Bragadin-Giustiniani dispute was a conflict between two competing printing houses in Venice over the printing of Jewish books that resulted in the burning of the Talmud in 1553 in Italy.

Originally an issue over the copyright of the Mishneh Torah, the conflicting parties involved Jewish authorities and the papal courts, including the Roman Inquisition, in this matter in order to ban the other's books. The renewed attention on Hebrew literature and the Talmud in particular in the times of heightened tension in Christianity due to the Reformation and Counter-Reformation led to the condemnation of the Talmud and its subsequent burning in 1553, first in Rome and then in most other Italian cities. In the decades afterwards the Talmud remained mostly forbidden, though papal policy varied depending on the pope, and Hebrew printing became subject to censorship.

The dispute has also some significance for Jewish copyright law and the feud is in general one of the earliest instances of a copyright suit for books.

== Background: Hebrew printing in Venice ==
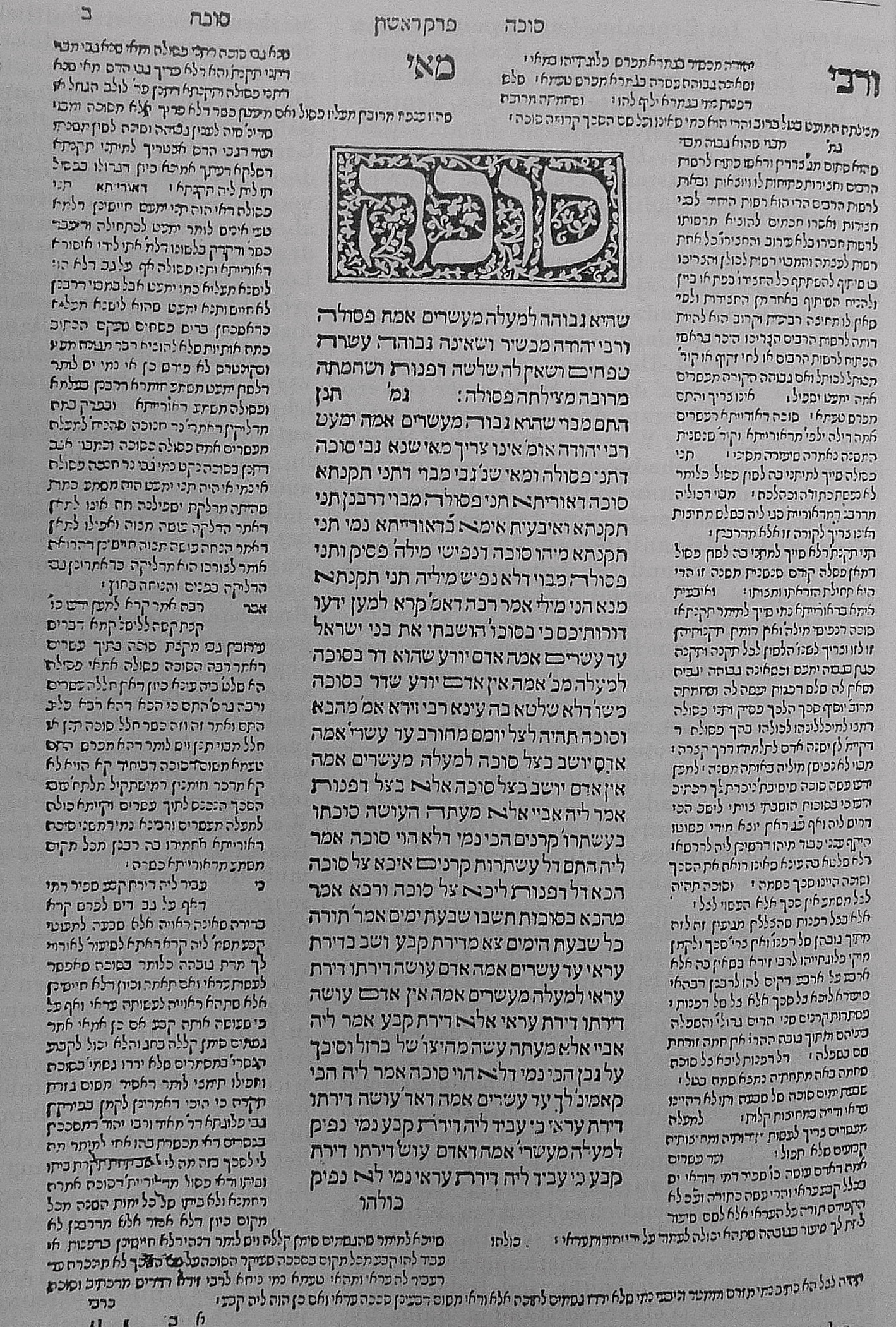
Babylonian Talmud; 2d edition; Printed by Daniel Bomberg, Venice

In the sixteenth century, Venice was the dominant city in printing, also including Hebrew printing. As Jews were prohibited from owning printing presses, Hebrew books were printed by non-Jews who had entered into various mutually beneficial arrangements with Jews to print such works, or by Jews or converts at Christian presses. These non-Jewish printers were mostly motivated by the profitability of the market as it was more limited and not as competitive as the wider Italian book sector. Nevertheless, printed Hebrew books were still fairly expensive and would have amounted to a considerable part of the annual salary of even well-paid Jews. (Note: According to the Bomberg catalog for the year 1542/43, the cost of the Babylon Talmud was 22 ducats, equal to around 15% of the annual income of well-to-do patrons. A horse or a slave was only marginally more expensive at 22-24%.)

Aldus Manutius was the first to use Hebrew letters in small works, but it was only with the press of Daniel Bomberg, a non-Jew, that Hebrew printing really begun in Venice. In December 1515 Bomberg requested and received the right and the monopoly for two decades to print Hebrew books. Pope Leo X granted Bomberg an imprimatur in 1520 to print the Talmud, reversing previous practice since the thirteenth century to suppress or censor the Talmud, though he required Bomberg to include comments of the Jewish convert and Augustinian Felice da Prato which pointed out fatal flaws and contradictions in the passages that attacked Christian faith. Until the closure of Bomberg's press in 1548/49, he had published between two hundred and two hundred-fifty titles. Though the books were initially printed in small editions and marketed in Italy, the fame of the Bomberg press was such that the books were imported by Jews in Egypt, Syria and India and Karaite Jews in Constantinople and Crimea.

Between 1544 and 1546, the monopoly ended and several other rival print shops opened. Among them was the print shop of Marco Antonio Giustiniani, son of the wealthy Niccolo Giustiniani and member of the important Giustiniani family, who operated a printing press close to the Rialto from 1545 onwards. His printing press never surpassed that of Bomberg in either quality or quantity, but it was still good enough to secure himself a reputation as printer of high quality. Bomberg closed his print shop in 1548/49, with some scholars such as Marvin Heller believing that he had been forced out of business by Giustiniani's low-price, often plagiarised prints. Thereafter, Hebrew printing was almost exclusively the domain of Giustiniani.

== The Dispute ==
=== The Katzenellenbogen-Bragadin and Giustiniani Misneh Torah prints ===
The feud begun in 1549-50 when Rabbi Meir ben Isaac Katzenellenbogen, chief rabbi of Padua and spiritual leader of the Jews of Venice, requested Giustiniani to print the Mishneh Torah of Maimonides. The Mishneh Torah included the seminal code of Jewish law that Spanish, Eastern and Italian Jews followed and had been published several times with numerous commentaries, the latest version by Daniel Bomberg in 1524. Katzenellenbogen had worked from these editions, but added commentaries of Maimonides, other medieval authors as well as of himself that had not been printed yet. For unknown reasons Giustiniani and Katzenellenbogen did not come to terms, so the rabbi looked for another printer to commission. He found that person in Alvise Bragadin, another Venetian noble who was in the process of establishing his own Hebrew publishing house and who agreed to take the commission. The result was essentially a new edition of the Mishneh Torah of Daniel Bomberg of 1524 with the additions of Katzenellenbogen's introduction to Maimonides' Sefer Hamitzvot, Nachmanides' Hasagot on Maimonides' Misneh Torah, a defense of Maimonides against his opponents and several notes by Katzenellenbogen himself. Thus, in 1550, Bragadin produced the first copies of the new Mishneh Torah and financed by the rabbi with his own savings.

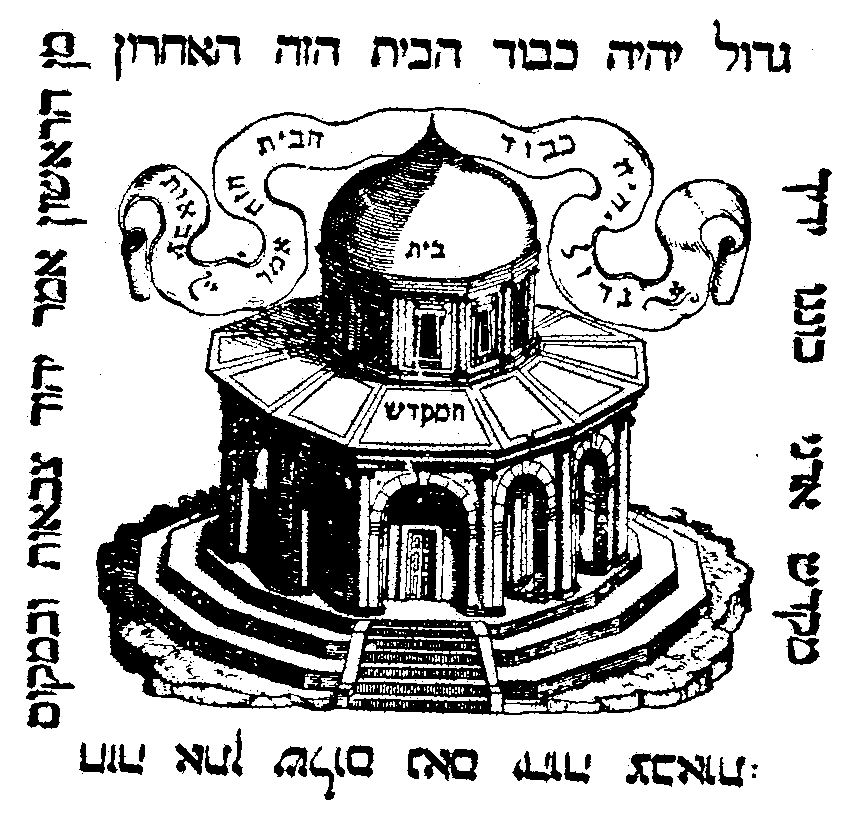
The printers' mark of Marco Antonio Giustiniani (Venice, 1545-52). It was stamped on the title page of the Hebrew books he published and showed the Temple in Jerusalem depicted as the Dome of the Rock.

Not long after the publishing of the Bragadin edition, Giustiniani released his own version of the Mishneh Torah with his renowned Temple pressmark. While some historians like Marvin Heller claim that Giustiniani plagiarised Bragadin, the question who copied from the other is not easy to answer. Though Giustiniani clearly copied the annotations of Katzenellenbogen and included them in his version, Yaakov Spiegel showed in his research that Bragadin and Katzenellenbogen most probably copied more from Giustiniani than the other way round. Giustiniani moved the plagiarised glosses of Katzenellenbogen to the end instead of having them accompany the text, which was likely due to the fact that Giustiniani wanted to keep the layout of the 1524 Bomberg edition and thus present himself as legitimate successor to Bomberg. In the introduction to Giustiniani's edition, which was possibly written by the former Jew and Bomberg's former master-printer Cornelius Adelkind, the annotations were criticised heavily and it was mentioned they were only included to give learned readers the opportunity to judge their worth independently. Additionally, in order to provide value-add to his readers, Giustiniani included material not found in Bragadin's version, such as page references to two leading commentaries of the Misneh Torah as well as precepts corresponding to Maimonides’s provisions from two seminal Ashkenazic codes, the Arba'ah Turim and the Sefer Mitzvot Gadol. Finally, Giustiniani stated that he would sell his version for one gold coin less than his competitor's, allegedly to make it more affordable for Jewish buyers.

=== The ruling of Moses Isserles ===
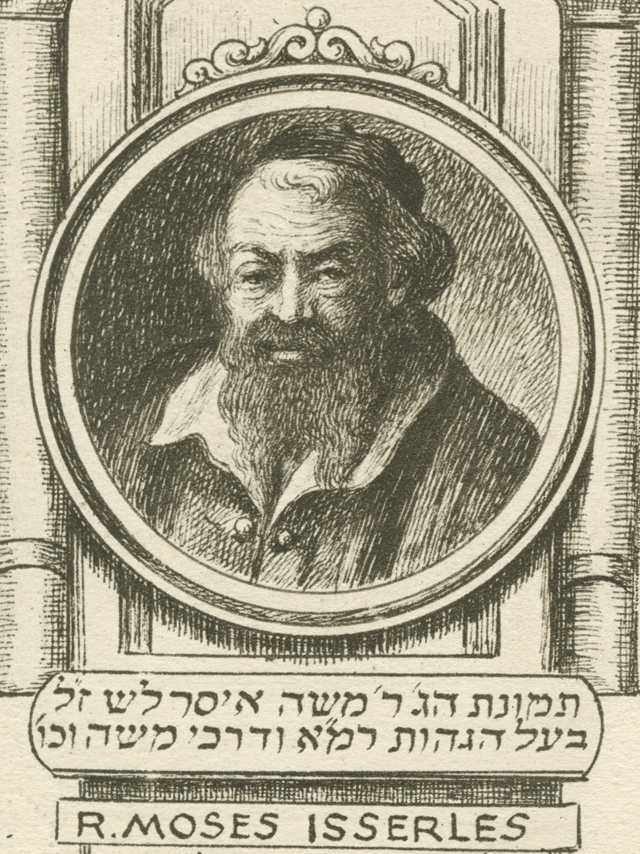
Anachronistic portrait of Moses Isserles

The plagiarism of both printers was neither unique nor unusual in Western Europe at the time and these matters were often settled in out-of-court settlements. As both parties had likely committed plagiarism and also as likely neither of the two books contained enough original material to qualify for a Venetian book privilege (active since 1517), no party would have had recourse under Venetian law. It is possible that Bragadin and Giustiniani could have also resolved their dispute outside of court, but this did not occur, maybe due to their general competition and Katzenellenbogen's concern about the loss of his investment in the Bragadin edition.

As he did not receive support from other Italian rabbis, Katzenellenbogen petitioned Rabbi Moses Isserles from Kraków, who was the preeminent Ashkenazic halakhic authority in Poland, to forbid Jews from buying the Giustiniani edition. Isserles was more junior to Katzenellenbogen in both chronological (at the time between 20 and 30 years old) as well rabbinic authority sense, and it would have been more likely that Isserles would have sought the guidance of Katzenellenbogen than the other way round. Neil Netanel suggests that the reasons why Katzenellenbogen wrote to Isserles are that Poland constituted the largest market for Hebrew books due to its sizeable Jewish population, the close ties between the Italian and Polish Jewish communities as well as the close intellectual kinship between Katzenellenbogen and Isserles. The ruling on this matter was in fact the first responsum of Isserles and he would later say that he felt unprepared to serve as rabbinic judge at such a young age. Further, this feud is one of the earliest instances of a copyright suit over any book.

On 16 August 1550, rabbi Isserles issued his ruling. Based on the information Katzenellenbogen had given him, he decided in favour of Katzenellenbogen and Bragadin, predominantly also due to the fact that they had published their version first. Isserles judged Giustiniani purely from a Jewish perspective and accused him of unlawful competition rather than theft (gezel). Based on his halakhic reasoning, he then forbade Jews from buying the Giustiniani or any other competing edition of the Mishneh Torah until Katzenellenbogen had sold his prints. Jews who neglected this ruling were to be excommunicated (herem), except if they did so under duress. While this ruling applied formally only to Poland, Isserles had the ambition to convince other Jewish rabbis to publish a similar response in other countries.

=== Appeal before the Pope ===
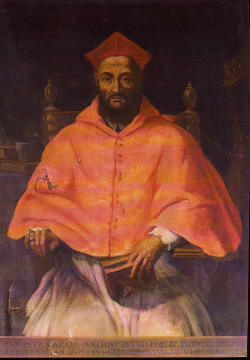
Giovanni Pietro Carafa, head of the Congregation of the Inquisition

Isserles and Katzenellenbogen had, however, underestimated Giustiniani who feared a loss on his investment upon hearing of Isserles' ruling. Giustiniani hired three Jewish converts, including former rabbi Andrea De Monte, to scrutinise Katzenellenbogen’s commentary on the Mishneh Torah for parts that could be interpreted as being objectionable to the Church and then appealed before papal authorities against Isserles' response while suggesting them to investigate Katzenellenbogen’s commentary for blasphemy and impropriety. Shortly afterwards, Bragadin sent representatives to the papal courts, also consisting of own employees and former Jews.

Pope Julius III referred the dispute to the Sacred Roman Ecclesiastical Commission and the Congregation of the Inquisition, a relatively new tribunal which was only to be involved in cases of heresy and schism and had been only instituted by the papal bull Licet ab initio in 1542. The Congregation consisted of six members, headed by cardinal Giovanni Pietro Carafa. (Note: The other members included cardinals Juan Álvarez de Toledo, Pierpaolo Parisio, Bartolomeo Guidiccioni, Dionisio Laurerio and Tommaso Badia.) Carafa was one of the major voices in the Church to intensify the struggle against heresy and Protestantism and develop measures, that would safeguard the purity of Christian society from heretic positions. Carafa therefore demanded the safeguarding of education, ordered the confiscation of works of many authors that he considered threatening to the authority of the Church and was convinced that the End of Days was close and with it, the conversion of the Jews. As the case involved two Venetian printers, the Roman Committee deemed it appropriate to get the assistance of the Council of Ten, one of the most important governing bodies of Venice. This Council advised the Commission against Blasphemy to find someone who could examine the Hebrew books present in the case and those that had been printed in the years prior.

In this process the attention slowly shifted to the Talmud. Already in December 1550 cardinal Girolamo Verallo had issued an official protest with the Venetian ambassador in Rome, Matteo Dandolo, about the continued printing in Venice of the Talmud, which he considered dangerous and spreading heresies. The protest, however, was in vain and in 1551, Giustiniani published a multi-volume Babylonian Talmud in 1551. While the delegates of both printers made their case, both groups of converts attacked the Talmud for containing blasphemous statements about Christians, Jesus Christ, Mary and the Church. While Giustiniani's delegates likely raised the Talmud as Bragadin had announced his intention to print a new, superior version of the Babylonian Talmud to that one of Giustiniani, Bragadin's representatives probably attacked the deficiencies of Giustiniani's edition. During the investigation, the Commission was also informed that Bomberg had printed Talmud several times without including the papal recommendation that it included the "refutations" of Felice da Prato and subsequently appointed censors to check all previous Hebrew prints.

While it is not certain whether the Bragadin-Giustiniani dispute directly impacted the policy of the pope, it very likely reverberated in the highest circles of the Church. Under the influence of the Counter-Reformation and the Roman Inquisition, the case fuelled already existing suspicions about Hebrew books. At the time, there were two views within the Church regarding the Talmud and rabbinic literature: one side argued that its prohibition would radically increase conversion of Jews to Christianity while the other argued that Jews could be converted if the Truth of Christianity could be proven from it while critical parts of Christianity could be expurgated. Both sides aimed for the conversion of Jews. As the general objective of the Roman Inquisition was to bring people to Christianity, its members were less motivated by the elimination of blasphemy but more by the obstacles to conversion they perceived the Talmud to be. Finally, the possibility that Isserles' ruling might be disseminated around Europe likely alerted Christian authorities, who found it necessary to object that a rabbi might interfere in matters of culture, printing and education on an international scale; this helps to understand why the authorities intervened in a prompt and harsh way in a comparably small dispute between two Venetian printers.

=== Burning of the Talmud in 1553 ===
The congregation reviewed the charges and, under the direction of Carafa, a collegial document signed by all members of the commission recommended the removal of both the Babylonian Talmud, the Talmud of the Land of Israel as well as any other kind of Talmudic compendia from private and public places. The document considered the Talmud as a collection of blasphemies and as a major obstacle in the conversion of Jews, hoping that its removal would lead to the Jews be compelled to study Holy Scriptures. There was, however, some anonymous opposition among the commission to burning the Talmud who suggested that Jews should still be allowed to keep copies of the Talmud - if they had been accurately revised and censored - as it was considered not only a repository of blasphemies but a genuine product derived from the study of the Mosaic law.

Nevertheless, on 9 September 1553, the Jewish New Year, the Inquisition searched all Jewish households in Rome for copies of the Talmud and burned them on the Campo de' Fiori by a decree of the Roman Inquisition. Pope Julius issued a bull three days later in which he directing the confiscation and burning of all copies of the Talmud throughout the Latin world. The decree explained that the Jews had abandoned the Old Testament, that it contained passages against morality and natural law along with blasphemous accusations against Christianity. This resulted in the burning of the burning of the Talmud and many other Hebrew books in nearly all other cities in Italy. On 21 October 1553 the Council of Ten ordered the confiscation and burning within 10 days of all copies of the Talmud and other books dependent on it in Venice; among the burned books were also numerous copies of the Mishneh Torah.

== Aftermath ==
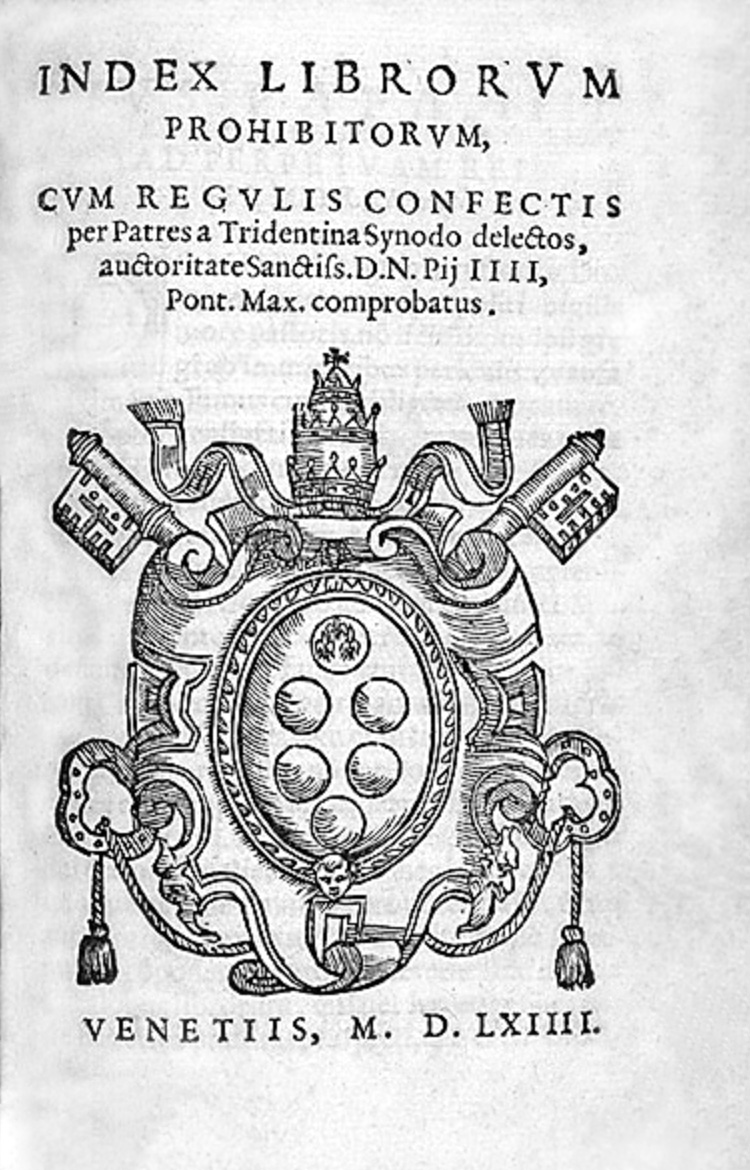
Title page of the 1564 edition of the Index Librorum Prohibitorum, printed in Venice.

As a consequence of the dispute both the Giustiniani and the Bragadin press stopped printing in 1552 and 1554, respectively, ending Hebrew printing for around decade. When Hebrew printing was again allowed in Venice in 1563, it was only Bragadin that resumed printing. The Bragadin family continued being one of Venice’s leading Hebrew print-shops, publishing Hebrew books well into the eighteenth century. The burning of the Talmud also resulted in a sharp price decrease for Talmudic tractates as owners quickly tried to sell their own editions of the forbidden texts, until but the later half of the sixteenth century when demand rose for these forbidden and therefore rare books.

Kenneth Stow argues that the burning of the Talmud was only one part of a multi-faceted policy organised by the popes of the late sixteenth century which sought the conversion of the Jews; policy which indeed had some success as the later sixteenth century saw a substantial increase in conversions from Judaism to Christianity. Nevertheless, papal policy regarding the prohibition of the Talmud varied between the different popes of this time. On 29 May 1554, Pope Julius III repeated in his bull Cum sicut nuper the order to destroy all copies of the Talmud but allowed the printing of Hebrew books that had been approved by a papal censor and permitting their possession if passages offending Christianity had been blotted out. His successor Paul IV, the former head of the commission Giovanni Pietro Carafa, reversed this decision in 1557 by forbidding Jews to possess any other Hebrew book than the Bible. In 1564, Pope Pius IV abandoned these prohibitions and although the Talmud was included in the Index Librorum Prohibitorum of 1564, the printing of the Talmud was allowed as long as it went through censorship and did not include the name "Talmud" on its front page. According to Kenneth Stow these fluctuations reflect the opinion of the respective pontiff regarding the positive or negative value of rabbinic literature.

Soon afterwards, Jewish communal bodies started to self-regulate and self-censor by trying to prevent the publishing of books, that could be considered offensive to Christianity. In 1554, a synod of Italian rabbis at Ferrara, including Meir Katzenellenbogen, decreed that no printer be allowed to print any book unless with the approval (haskhamah) of three ordained rabbis. This act of self-protection reflected both to the increased censorial pressure coming from the Inquisition as well as a way to deal with the uncontrolled dissemination of Kabbalistic texts, which were becoming popular. According to Heinrich Graetz, this was further exacerbated by the religious and cultural vacuum which the burning of the Talmud had caused and which was now filled which the equally authoritative and ancient Kabbalah. While the Catholic Church suppressed and proscribed the Talmud, it actively promoted the printing of Kabbalah, which it regarded as more conducive to the conversion of Jew and as the part of Judaism that had to be saved from burning.

== See also ==
- Disputation of Paris

== Bibliography ==
- Bo, Federico Dal (23 September 2024). Print, Power, and Cultural Hegemony: A Material History of Early Hebrew Prints. Walter de Gruyter GmbH & Co KG. ISBN 978-3-11-139315-5.
- Gondos, Andrea (2021). Kabbalah in Print: The Study and Popularization of Jewish Mysticism in Early Modernity. Albany: SUNY Press. ISBN 9781438479736.
- Freedman, Harry (15 February 2024). Shylock's Venice: The Remarkable History of Venice's Jews and the Ghetto. Bloomsbury Publishing. ISBN 978-1-3994-0725-0.
- Heller, Marvin J. (9 January 2013). Further Studies in the Making of the Early Hebrew Book. BRILL. ISBN 978-90-04-23461-1.
- Heller, Marvin J. (5 December 2022). The Sixteenth Century Hebrew Book: Volume One. BRILL. ISBN 978-90-04-53166-6.
- Netanel, Neil Weinstock (4 February 2016). From Maimonides to Microsoft: The Jewish Law of Copyright Since the Birth of Print. Oxford University Press. ISBN 978-0-19-970733-1.
- Raz-Krakotzkin, Amnon (6 August 2007). The Censor, the Editor, and the Text: The Catholic Church and the Shaping of the Jewish Canon in the Sixteenth Century. University of Pennsylvania Press. ISBN 978-0-8122-4011-5.
- Stern, David (2024). "Burning the Talmud - Before and after Print". In Kogman Appel, Katrin; Steinmann, Ilona (eds.). Premodern Jewish Books, their Makers and Readers in an Era of Media Change. Brepols. pp. 301–339. ISBN 978-2-503-60463-3.
- Stow, Kenneth R. (1972). "The Burning of the Talmud in 1553, in the Light of Sixteenth Century Catholic Attitudes Toward the Talmud". Bibliothèque d'Humanisme et Renaissance. 34 (3): 435–459. ISSN 0006-1999. JSTOR 20674961.
