= Jack V. Lunzer =

British businessman

Jack Valmadonna Lunzer (1924–2016) was an industrial diamond merchant and the custodian of the Valmadonna Trust Library.

== Biography ==
Lunzer was born in Antwerp in 1924, where his British father was working as a diamond dealer for De Beers. He was a great-grandson of the scholar Eliezer Liepman Philip Prins (1835-1915). His grandfather, Julius, was the founding president of the Adath Yisroel Synagogue in London. He moved to London as a child where he was educated. He worked during World War II in a Spitfire engine factory making diamond tools. He began to work under his father but disliked working for De Beers, so he established his own firm, Industrial Diamond Company, exploiting the niche market for industrial diamonds. He took over his father's dealer business in 1949 and later expanded into mining. By the 1980s, his company had annual sales of $100 million. In 1948, Lunzer married Ruth Zippel, the Italian-born daughter of a Polish merchant. Her father had a collection of Hebrew books that she and Lunzer took to London as the basis for the Valmadonna Trust Library. Lunzer has five adult daughters: Margaret, Myra, Fiona, Alison and Caroline. Ruth Lunzer died in 1978. The daughters are the beneficiaries of the Valmadonna Trust. Lunzer died peacefully at home on 18 December 2016.

== The Valmadonna Trust Library ==
Lunzer's interest was originally invested in racehorses. By the 1950s that interest turned to collecting rare Hebrew books. Over the next six decades, he advised the Trustees of the Valmadonna Trust Library in respect of their acquisition of 13,000 books and manuscripts . It is named after Valmadonna, a small town near Alessandria in north-west Italy where his wife's family had ties. The library encompasses works from throughout the world, particularly Italy, where Hebrew printing began. It covers four and a half centuries of typography. Many items in the library are rare or unique, among them some of the earliest Hebrew printed books. Lunzer lived in Hampstead Garden Suburb, London, where he had held the collection in his home. Since 1982 and until the sale of the collection in 2017, the librarian for the collection was Mrs Pauline Malkiel.

In February 2009, the Valmadonna Trust Library was exhibited by Sotheby's in New York. After visiting the exhibition at Sotheby's, a scholar from the Drisha Institute wrote of Lunzer's achievement:

"The morning of our visit, I studied the commentary of Rabbi David Kimhi, who is known as the Radak, on Joseph's conflict with his brothers. Honestly, it felt like just another of the many rabbinic commentaries... Then I went to the Valmadonna. Peering closely at one of the oldest manuscripts, I saw that it was a volume of Psalms with the Radak's commentary. In that instant, time and space collapsed as I found myself bound to every other Jew who has studied Kimhi's work since it was penned in the late 12th and early 13th centuries. That moment made clear to me that I am not simply a modern Jew studying in a contemporary yeshiva near Lincoln Center. I am tied to every other Jew through 800 years of history. I envision Kimhi hunched over his work, and wonder if his soul knows that even still we are learning from him, that his elucidation remains as relevant to the study of biblical text as it was to his contemporaries. The books of the Valmadonna – the books of our people – bring history alive [and] keep our history alive even when the communities that produce them are long dead".

In December 2015, Sotheby's New York presided over the sale of the Daniel Bomberg Babylonian Talmud (1519-1523) from the Valmadonna Trust for $9.3 million, the copy that Lunzer obtained in trade from Westminster Abbey in 1980. In 1956, Jack Lunzer, the custodian of the Valmadonna Trust attended an exhibition at the Victoria and Albert Museum celebrating 300 years of Jewish resettlement in England. There, he first became aware of Westminster Abbey's magnificent complete copy of the Talmud. For nearly a quarter century, Mr. Lunzer courted the Abbey in an attempt to acquire it. Eventually, he persuaded his Trustees to purchase a 900-year old copy (actually an early-mediaeval forgery) of Westminster Abbey's original charter and presented it to the Abbey, along with supporting endowments. In grateful recognition of this singular act of largesse, the Abbey awarded the custodian its magnificent copy of the Bomberg Talmud.

In January 2017, the Valmadonna Trust Library was sold to the National Library of Israel through a private sale arranged by Sotheby's. David Blumberg, chairman of the board of directors of the National Library of Israel, said:

“The Valmadonna Trust Library represents an historic addition to our leading collection of Jewish manuscripts, prints and books, which reflect and embody the cultures of the Jewish people around the world and across the ages”.

The Valmadonna Trust Library is housed in the National Library of Israel's landmark new building in Jerusalem, which opened to the public in 2023.
