= Menachem Cohen =

Menachem Cohen may refer to:

- Menachem Cohen (politician) (1922–1975), Israeli politician
- Menachem Cohen (scholar) (born 1928), Israeli scholar
- Menachem Cohen (architect), Israeli architect who designed Tel Aviv City Hall
