= Valmadonna Trust Library =

Hebrew Library

The Valmadonna Trust Library was a collection of 13,000 printed books and manuscripts printed in Hebrew or in Hebrew script. It was sold by the Trustees in January 2017 to the National Library of Israel (NLI). It is named after Valmadonna, a small town near Alessandria in north-west Italy with longstanding connections to the Lunzer family. The collection encompasses works from throughout the world, particularly Italy, "the cradle of Hebrew printing", and covers over a millennium; many items in the collection are rare or unique, and many date back to the earliest Hebrew printings. Before it was acquired by the NLI, Arthur Kiron, curator of Judaica collections at the University of Pennsylvania, said, "I don't know any other collection quite like it in private hands. It even rivals some of the great institutional collections in the world."

== Collection ==
Notable items in the collection include the following:

- A well-preserved set of the Babylonian Talmud (1519–23) designed by a panel of scholars and codifying many aspects of how the Talmud is laid out, printed in Venice by Daniel Bomberg; Lunzer acquired this in 1980 from the collection of Westminster Abbey in exchange for a 900-year-old copy of the Abbey’s original Charter, and supporting endowments, fulfilling a 25-year dream. This item was sold in 2015, see below.
- A Hebrew Bible from England (known as the Codex Valmadonna I), handwritten in 1189 and looted the next year during the destruction of the Jewish community of York, which is the only known surviving Hebrew Bible from England dated prior to the expulsion of the Jews in 1290 under King Edward I.,
- A Franco-German Pentateuch, probably written in the 10th or 11th century
- A 12th-century scroll of the Pentateuch from the Samaritans, written in the Samaritan alphabet.
- The first Mikraot Gedolot
- The earliest dated illustrated Haggadah of Pesach known to exist, printed in Prague in 1526.
- A Pentateuch from Constantinople dated 1547, containing Spanish and Greek translations written using Hebrew script.
- One of the first illustrated Hebrew books: A 1492 Mishna with commentary by Maimonides
- The first book printed in Lisbon, 1489, Nahmanides’ commentary on the Pentateuch.
- A 19th-century copy of A Thousand and One Nights from Calcutta, in Arabic spelled out in Hebrew script.
- An illustrated guide for shechita from early 20th-century Pakistan, with Hebrew and Marathi on facing pages.
- A copy of every Hebrew book published in Cremona during the ten-year period such printing was allowed, ending in the 1560s.
- The first book ever printed in Turkey, a 1493 copy of the Arba'ah Turim.
- The first book ever printed in Africa, a Hebrew book about prayer from Fez dated 1516.
- The first scientific work printed in Portugal, by Abraham Zacuto in 1496.
- An 1848 copy of the Communist Manifesto in German, one of eleven surviving copies of the first edition's February 1848 second printing in London.
- A Book of Psalms with part of its Radak commentary crossed out by a Christian censor.
- A 1666 Dutch newspaper with a front page headline and article describing Sabbatai Zevi.
- A Venice Sukkah decoration from 1783.

== Collection sale ==
In early 2009, the collection, estimated to be worth in excess of US$40 million, was placed for sale by Sotheby's, with the proviso that it be sold as a whole and not broken up, and remain accessible to scholars. The custodian Jack V. Lunzer, who is not benefitting from the proceeds of the sale, has stated that "I would like our library to be acquired by the Library of Congress. That would be my great joy." After visiting the exhibition of the collection at Sotheby's, a scholar from the Drisha Institute wrote of Lunzer's achievement:

The morning of our visit, I studied the commentary of Rabbi David Kimhi, who is known as the Radak, on Joseph's conflict with his brothers. Honestly, it felt like just another of the many rabbinic commentaries.... Then I went to the Valmadonna. Peering closely at one of the oldest manuscripts, I saw that it was a volume of Psalms with the Radak's commentary. In that instant, time and space collapsed as I found myself bound to every other Jew who has studied Kimhi's work since it was penned in the late 12th and early 13th centuries. That moment made clear to me that I am not simply a modern Jew studying in a contemporary yeshiva near Lincoln Center. I am tied to every other Jew through 800 years of history. I envision Kimhi hunched over his work, and wonder if his soul knows that even still we are learning from him, that his elucidation remains as relevant to the study of biblical text as it was to his contemporaries. The books of the Valmadonna – the books of our people – bring history alive [and] keep our history alive even when the communities that produce them are long dead.

In May 2011, The Jewish Chronicle in London reported that the collection was still for sale, perhaps for around US$25 million.

In December 2015, Sotheby's New York presided over the sale of the Daniel Bomberg Babylonian Talmud (1519-1523) from the Valmadonna Trust for $9.3 million, the copy that Lunzer obtained in trade from Westminster Abbey in 1980.

In January 2017, the collection was sold to the National Library of Israel in January 2017 through a private sale arranged by Sotheby's. David Blumberg, chairman of the board of directors of the National Library of Israel, said:

“The Valmadonna Trust Library represents an historic addition to our leading collection of Jewish manuscripts, prints and books, which reflect and embody the cultures of the Jewish people around the world and across the ages”.

The Valmadonna Trust Library is housed in the National Library of Israel's landmark new building in Jerusalem, which opened to the public in 2023. Most of the Valmadonna collection is displayed in the special collections reading room.
