= Sforno (family) =

Jewish Italian family

Sforno is the name of a prominent Jewish Italian family, many members of which distinguished themselves as rabbis and scholars. The most prominent of these were the following:

== Hananeel ben Jacob Sforno ==
Scholar of Talmud. He lived at Bologna in the fifteenth and sixteenth centuries, and was the brother of Obadiah Sforno, who mentions him in the introduction to his commentary on the Pentateuch. Obadiah also writes that Hananeel was a financier, and at one point, supported Obadiah financially. A responsum of Hananeel's was inserted by Shabbethai Baer in his Beer Eshek.

== Israel Sforno ==
Talmudist; lived at Viadano in the sixteenth century. A halakhic decision of his is quoted in a manuscript collection of 260 responsa of the Italian rabbis (No. 235).

== Jacob ben Obadiah Sforno ==
Venetian scholar of the sixteenth and seventeenth centuries. Shabbethai Bass, and, after him, Wolf, attributed to Jacob a work entitled Iggeret ha-Ṭe'amim (Venice, 1600), containing mystic explanations of the accents. The correctness of the ascription is, however, doubted by Steinschneider, who believes that this work is identical with one of the same title by Aaron Abraham ben Baruch.

== Nissim Isaac ben Judah Sforno ==
A rabbi at Mantua in the sixteenth century. He was the author of an epistle on the Kuzari. A responsum (legal novella) of his is quoted in the above-mentioned collection.

== Obadiah ben Israel Sforno ==
Venetian Talmudist of the sixteenth and seventeenth centuries. He edited Menahem Azariah di Fano's Yemin Adonai Romemah (Venice, n.d.); and a responsum of his is inserted in Di Fano's collection of Responsa (Venice, n.d., p. 83).

== Obadiah ben Jacob Sforno ==
Italian exegete, philosopher, and physician; born at Cesena about 1475; died at Bologna in 1550. See the main article on him, Obadiah ben Jacob Sforno.

== Osheah ben Nissim Isaac Sforno ==
Rabbi at Mantua in the first half of the seventeenth century. A religious poem of his was inserted by Joseph Jedidiah Karmi in his Kenaf Renanim.

== Solomon Shmaya ben Nissim Isaac Sforno ==
Rabbi at Asti, later at Venice; died in 1617. Several responsa of his were inserted by Jacob Heilbronner in his Naḥalat Ya'aḳob (Padua, 1622). Solomon left in manuscript commentaries on Psalms, Proverbs, Job, Daniel, the Megillot, Ezra, Nehemiah, and Chronicles. He edited the Cuzari with the commentary of Judah Moscato (Venice, 1594). On his death a funeral sermon was pronounced by Leon of Modena, who lauded him in the highest terms.

== See also ==
- Rabbi
