= Judah ben Joseph ibn Bulat =

Judah ben Joseph ibn Bulat was a Navarrese Talmudist and rabbi; born at the end of the 15th century in Estella, Navarre; died probably in Istanbul about 1550.

He was the author of Kelal Ḳaẓer mi-Kol ha-Rashum Beketab (Short Abstract of All That Has Been Published), containing a short compendium of rabbinic theology, Halakah, morals, ethics, jurisprudence, and political science. The book appeared in manuscript in Istanbul in 1530, and could be obtained from the author only for a limited time, on the payment of one florin as a fee for perusal. Besides, Bulat published the Talmud methodology Halikot 'Olam of Joshua ben Joseph (Constantinople, 1510). Tam ibn Yaḥyah, in his work "Tummat Yesharim," and Elijah Mizraḥi, in his responsa, both colleagues of Bulat in Istanbul, cite some of his responsa.

Bulat, possessing a thorough knowledge of the Talmud, opened up new methods in Talmudic study. He decided that the method of Talmud interpretation practiced by some of his contemporaries was contradictory to the real meaning of the Talmud. It was their custom to regard every opinion, even every sentence, in the Talmud as a binding rule; and they went so far as to look upon every "poseḳ" (post-Talmudic Halakah) in the same way. Consequently, a vast number of new "ḥumrot" (intensifications of the Law) continued to be introduced; and it was considered a duty of the pious to refrain from acts tabooed by their predecessors, though only by a few of them.

Similarly, the theoretical opinions of earlier Talmud commentators were studied in a receptive, uncritical spirit. Bulat, however, returned to the Talmud itself. He distinguished between the decisions arrived at in the Talmud, that should be regarded as standard, and the opinions of individuals, which might be disregarded. He sought for the true meaning, the motives and aims of the Talmudic controversies and Halakot; and he considered needless intensifications of the Law, especially in marital and juridical questions, as criminal. He maintained that whoever was unable to find in the Talmud a true solution of new circumstances, by means of logic and analogy, was not worthy to work in the province of Halakah; and that investigations into the meaning of "posḳim" as a rule lead to nothing. "Many times," said Bulat, "the reader is perplexed because of the disagreement between the various writers; and often the different parts of a poseḳ contradict one another, thus perplexing and completely bewildering the reader. For this reason the true rendering of the text must be sought in the original source" ("Tummat Yesharim," No. 34).

It was natural that in his endeavor to carry his views into practise he should meet with the opposition of his colleagues at Constantinople (ib. No. 39). Nevertheless, it is reported that even his opponents respected him; and one of them, Tam ibn Yaḥyah, used to address him with the most flattering epithets (ib. Nos. 35, 38).
