= David Mavrogonato =

15th-century Cretan Jewish merchant, translator, and spy

David Mavrogonato (or Maurogonato; died 1470) was a Cretan Jewish merchant, intercessor, and spy for the Republic of Venice in the Ottoman Empire. He also worked as a translator for Greek priests. He reported Cretan rebellion plans to Venice. His successful career as a diplomatic operative of Venice earned his descendants an exemption from the policies targeting Jewish people that fell under its imperial control at the time.

== Life and work ==
In return for his services to Venice, his family were granted special privileges that they maintained until the 17th century. Jews at the time in Venice were subject to discriminatory taxes and required clothing that marked them as Jewish. In 1463 and 1466, in return for reporting a conspiracy to overthrow Venetian colonial rule of Crete in 1453, the Council of Ten gave him a tax break, the right to not pay additional taxes due from the Jewish community, the right for him and his heirs not to wear the badge that Jews were forced to wear or any clothes that would mark him as Jewish, the right to live wherever he wished in the city of Candia (Venetian Crete), the right to sell his merchandise on Venetian ships, and an annual stipend. He was paid 3000 hyperpera and an annual pension of 500 hyperpera, which continued to be paid to his children after his death.

At the time Jews were required to wear a yellow or red head covering, but he and his descendants were allowed to wear less noticeable black hats. His descendant Elia Mavrogonato was granted the right to wear a black capello in 1616. His descendant the "excellent doctor" Jeremiah Mavrogonato was allowed in 1633 and 1638 to live outside the Jewish ghetto of Venice and to wear a black hat without being harassed or punished, and to come and go as he pleased.

David was also involved with peace negotiations with Mehmet II and was sent to Istanbul a number of times by the Venetians. Still, David was not a citizen despite receiving protection from the state, and he was forced to live in Venice for a few years to avoid the retaliation of those he had denounced. He was blamed by the Jews of the island for anti-Jewish sentiment. Moses Capsali, the rabbi of Constantinople, threatened him with excommunication for being a malshin or informer. He later entrusted his affairs to his bodyguard Salomone of Piove di Sacco.
