= Jacob Marcaria =

Italian printer

Jacob Marcaria (died 1562) is best known as operator of the Jewish printing press in Trento in the period from 1558 to 1562.

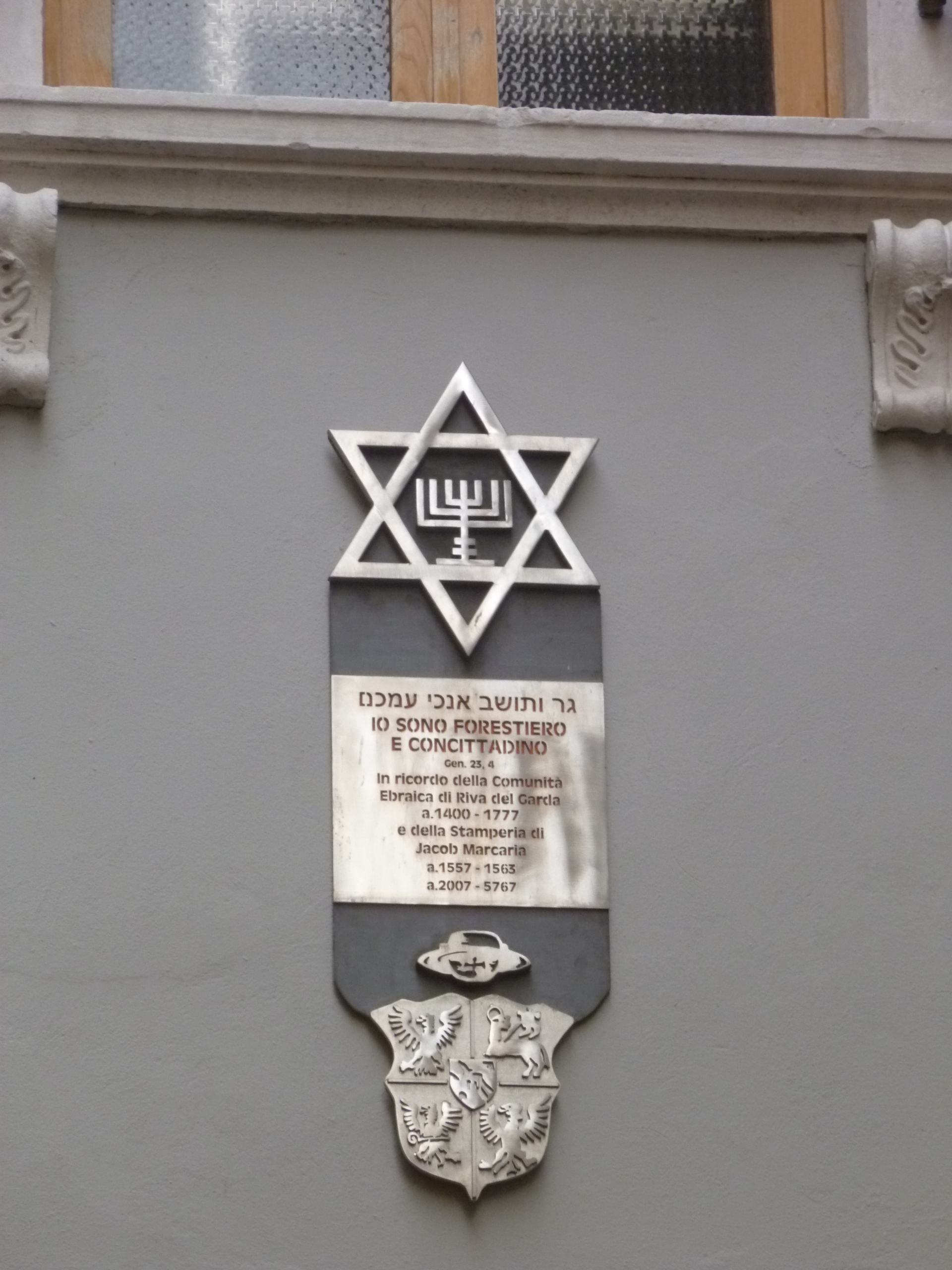
Commemorative plaque for Jacob Marcaria in Riva del Garda, Italy

The press was licensed under Joseph Ottolengo, a German rabbi to whom Cardinal Cristoforo Madruzzo had granted the privilege of printing Hebrew books. Marcaria also practiced as a physician. Marcaria edited several of the works himself, and in some cases is thought to have in fact authored works published under other writers' names. His best known work is probably Kitzur Mizrachi a summary of Elijah Mizrachi's Sefer ha-Mizrachi.
