= Yehuda Kiel =

Yehuda Kiel יהודה קיל
- Born: 1916; Saint Petersburg, Russian Empire
- Died: 16 June 2011 (aged 94-95); Jerusalem, Israel
- Citizenship: Israeli
- Writing career
- Language: Hebrew
- Notable awards: Israel Prize (1992)

Yehuda Kiel (Hebrew: יהודה קיל; born 1916, died 16 June 2011) was an Israeli educator and Bible commentator.

== Biography ==
Yehuda Kiel was born in Saint Petersburg, Russia. Following the Russian Revolution, he moved with his family to Panevėžys, Lithuania and later to Latvia.

In 1936, Kiel immigrated to Mandate Palestine. He studied Knowledge of the Land of Israel, history, sociology and psychology at the Hebrew University of Jerusalem. He worked for the students union and was National Executive secretary of Bnei Akiva. After completing his degree in 1940, he taught at Kfar Haroeh, together with his future wife, Tamar. They married in 1941.

From 1967 to 1977, Kiel headed the religious education department of the Israel Ministry of Education.

Kiel was best known for his monumental biblical commentary, Da'at Miqra project, which he headed and which encompasses modern scientific research with traditional biblical exegesis.

He died in Jerusalem on 16 June 2011. His daughter, Hasia, is the mother of the State Comptroller of Israel, Matanyahu Englman.

== Awards and recognition ==
- In 1992, Kiel was awarded the Israel Prize, for Jewish studies.
- In 2002, he received the Yakir Yerushalayim (Worthy Citizen of Jerusalem) award from the city of Jerusalem.

== See also ==
- List of Israel Prize recipients
- Jewish commentaries on the Bible
