= Sinai (journal) =

Academic journal

Sinai: Journal of Torah and Jewish Studies
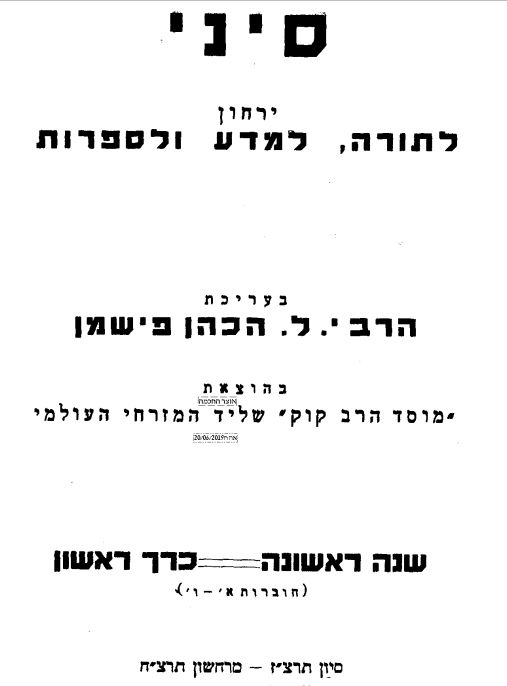
- Discipline: Torah and Jewish studies
- Language: Hebrew
- Edited by: Yehuda Leib Maimon

Publication details
- History: 1937–2020
- Publisher: Mossad Harav Kook (Israel)
- Frequency: bi-annually (once every 6 months)

Standard abbreviations
- ISO 4: Sinai

Indexing
- ISSN: 0334-4304
- OCLC no.: 1765573

Sinai (Hebrew: סיני; Siynay) was a bi-annual journal for research in the fields of Torah and Jewish studies (much of its content based on Cairo Genizah research) and more. The magazine was published continuously, once every six months (despite the Hebrew name "Monthly") from 1937 to 2020, published by the Rav Kook Institute.

Editors of the journal hoped to broaden the study of the Hebrew language, as well as promote thereby the investigation of Israelite history, as well as to dispense of Talmudic, Midrashic and halachic literature.

== History ==
The journal is devoted to Torah, literature and Jewish learning. The first chief-editor of the journal was Rabbi Yehuda Leib Maimon, who edited from 1937 until his death in 1962. Its initial goal was "to create a permanent literary platform, Torah and scientific, for national religious Judaism." Initially the journal was supported and funded by the Bialik Institute and the Jewish Agency and also included a publicist section, for articles on current affairs and a section on fine literature, which were abolished over the years and contributed to its establishment as a unique journal for Torah research and Jewish studies.

In 1958, a Jubilee edition was published to mark the appearance of the fortieth volume of the Sinai bi-annual for the study of Torah, science and literature, and which included at its end an index of authors and topics covered over the past twenty years. In 1987, marking the fiftieth year of its publication, a two-part Jubilee volume was published.

In 1962, Dr. Yitzhak Rafael replaced Rabbi Maimon as editor of the journal. Rafael published sections extracted from the journal, dealing with such topics as "Chiddushei Torah" (Novellæ from the Torah), and the bibliographic section for which he installed supplementary editions for "Sinai", such as Beit Talmud, the Oral law and the Areshet Year Book.

In 1999, Rabbi Yosef Eliyahu Halevi Movshovitz replaced Dr. Rafael. The journal ceased its publication in 2020.

== Abstracting and indexing ==
The journal is abstracted and indexed in the Modern Language Association Database. Sinai is held in the library holdings of the National Library of Israel.
