= Daniel Bomberg =

Flemish-Italian printer (1483–1549)

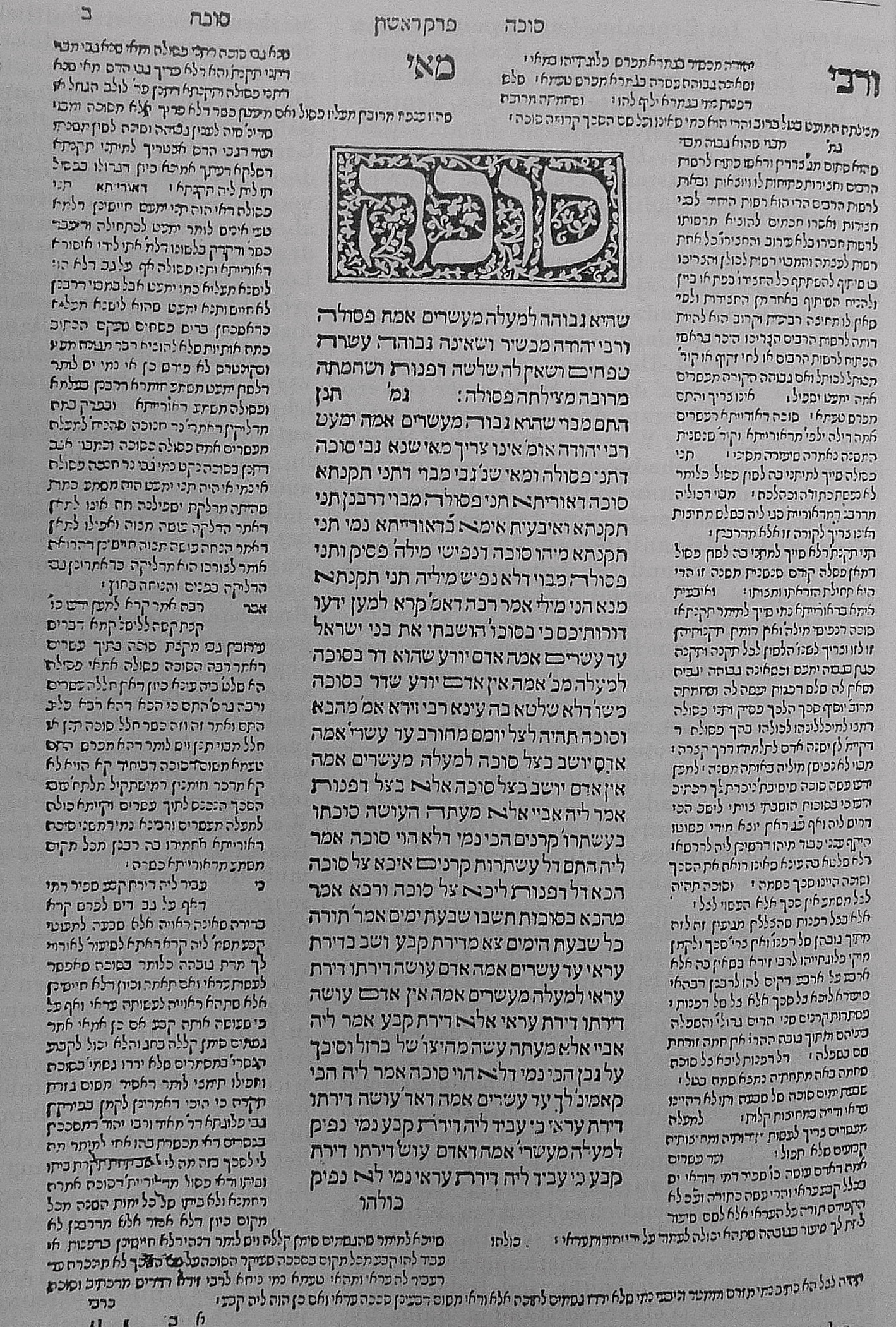
Babylonian Talmud; 2d edition; printed by Daniel Bomberg, Venice.

Daniel Bomberg (c. 1483 – c. 1549) was one of the most important early printers of Hebrew books. A Christian Hebraist who employed rabbis, scholars and apostates in his Venice publishing house, Bomberg printed the first Mikraot Gedolot (Rabbinic Bible) and the first complete Babylonian and Jerusalem Talmuds, based on the layout pioneered by the Soncino family printers, with the commentaries of Rashi and of the Tosafot in the margins. The editions set standards that have been followed in the subsequent five centuries, in particular the pagination of the Babylonian Talmud. In addition to secular works, his publishing house printed about 200 Hebrew books, including Siddurim, responsa, codes of law, works of philosophy and ethics and commentaries. He was the first Hebrew printer in Venice and the first non-Jewish printer of Hebrew books.

== Biography ==
Bomberg was born around 1483 in Antwerp, Brabant to Cornelius van Bombergen and Agnes Vranckx. Van Bombergen was a merchant and sent his son to Venice to help with the family business. There Daniel met Felix Pratensis (Felice da Prato), an Augustinian friar who had converted from Judaism, and who is said to be the one who encouraged Bomberg to print Hebrew books. Bomberg established an initially successful printing press in Venice, in which he was said to have invested over 4,000,000 ducats. Other sources, likely equally exaggerated, claim that he lost at least as much. He returned to Antwerp in 1539, though his press continued to operate until 1548, and it seems he retained some level of involvement throughout. Very little is known about the circumstances of his death some time between 1549 and 1553.

== Publication of the Pentateuch and Mikraot Gedolot (1517–19) ==
Bomberg began his printing career in 1517 with the first edition of Mikraot Gedolot (Rabbinic Bible). The four-volume set included the Masoretic text of the Torah (Hebrew Pentateuch) with accompanying commentaries (many of which had never previously been printed), a targum (Aramaic translation), the haftarot and the Five Megillot. The commentaries included by Bomberg and placed side-by-side on thee page covered a wide geographical, chronological and methodological gamut, featuring the text of the Torah the interpretive works of Rashi and Targum Onkelos, a translation of the Torah written in Jewish Babylonian Aramaic and dating back to the second century CE. Other commentators included were Rashbam, Abraham ibn Ezra, Nachmanides (Ramban), David Kimhi (Radak) and Obadiah ben Jacob Sforno. It was printed with the imprimatur of Pope Leo X and the editing of the first edition was overseen by Felix Pratensis, a Jewish convert to Christianity. Bomberg's Mikraot Gedolot became a model for future printings of the Hebrew Bible and was used as reference for the King James Version and other subsequent Christian translations of the Old Testament.

=== Criticism ===
The first edition generated harsh criticism by Jewish audiences, possibly because of its numerous errors, albeit mostly minor issues in the cantillation and pronunciation marks, and possibly because of objections to the involvement of the Pope in authorizing the publication and of the apostate Pratensis's role as editor. In a second edition edited by Jacob ben Hayyim ibn Adonijah, hundreds of such errors were fixed, and though it still generated criticism, it nonetheless served as the standard upon which future printings of Mikraot Gedolot were based.

=== Innovations in use of chapter and verse numbers ===
Bomberg was the first to print chapter and verse numbers in a Hebrew Bible. The division of the Vulgate into chapters was made in the 13th century, and Jews began adopting the numbers for use in concordances by the mid-fourteen hundreds, yet until Bomberg, no Hebrew bible had ever included the chapter numbers as part of the book itself. Bomberg not only added the chapter numbers; he was the first to indicate verse numbers on the printed page, a convention that had been used informally for centuries, but that had never previously been on the printed page of the bible. This seemingly trivial innovation immediately caught on and can be seen in many bibles of his era those printed since.

=== Self-censorship ===
Though Bomberg opposed censorship in principle, he knew of the controversial potential of printing texts seen as threatening to Christianity. Thus, for example, the commentary of Rabbi David Kimhi (RaDaK) was significantly censored because it contained material that could possibly be seen as offensive by Christians. These were published later in a separate book, which Bomberg released in a limited edition.

== Publication of the Babylonian Talmud (1519–23) ==
Probably Bomberg's most impressive accomplishment is his publication of the editio princeps (first printed edition) of the complete Babylonian Talmud, which he completed in under four years. Bomberg adopted the format created by Joshua Solomon Soncino, who printed the first individual tractates of the Talmud in 1483, with the Talmud text in the middle of the page and the commentaries of Rashi and Tosafot surrounding it, with Rashi on the inside closer to the binding and Tosafot on the outer edge of the page. Published with the approval of Pope Leo X, this edition became the standard format, which all later editions have followed. The project was overseen by chief editor Rabbi Chiya Meir b. David, a rosh yeshiva and dayan (judge) on the Venice rabbinical court. In addition to the Rashi and the Tosafot on the page, Bomberg included other commentaries at the back, such as Rabbeinu Asher (Rosh), Maimonides’ commentary on the Mishnah and Piskei Tosafot.

=== Standardization ===
The Bomberg edition of the Talmud established the standard both in terms of page layout as well as pagination (with the exception of the tractate Berachot which follows Bomberg's second edition). Prior to the printing of the Talmud, manuscripts had no standard page division, and the Talmud text usually did not appear on the same page as the commentaries, which were contained in separate codices. The standard page layout in use in all conventional editions of the Talmud published since then (and the accepted method of citing a Talmudic reference) follows the pagination of Bomberg's 1523 publication.

=== Originality ===
The earliest printed Talmuds were published by the Soncino family decades prior to Bomberg's Talmud. Though the Soncinos only printed about 23 tractates (selecting those most frequently studied), Bomberg clearly based his own publication after their model. Gershon Soncino claimed that in addition to emulating his layout, Bomberg also copied the texts of the Soncino Talmuds, a claim some modern scholars, such as Raphael Rabinovicz, have substantiated. Bomberg 's complete Talmud included many tractates that Soncino never released, which were obviously rendered directly from manuscripts, and even the editions which may have borrowed from Soncino's text show evidence of having been supplemented by additional manuscripts.

=== Staff ===
Bomberg employed some of Venice's leading scholars and Rabbis in his publishing house. Besides Rabbi Chiya Meir b. David, rosh yeshiva and dayan in Venice, there were notable figures such as Rabbi Avraham de Balmes, Rabbi Chaim b. Rabbi Moshe Alton, and the Maharam Padua. Bomberg's Talmud edition is generally considered highly accurate, and many bibliographers and historians have praised the precision of the text.

=== Publishing rights ===
In 1518, Bomberg requested and received from the Venetian Senate the exclusive printing rights to the Talmud, and received official endorsement from Pope Leo X. Nonetheless, Venetian politicians were suspicious of Hebrew printing. In 1525, when Bomberg attempted to renew his license for a fee of 100 ducats, the Venetian senate refused, accusing Bomberg's Hebrew publications of attacking the Catholic faith. Several months later, for a fee of 500 ducats, they approved his appeal and renewed his license.

=== Censorship and papal approval ===
Unlike the previously printed editions of the Talmud, Bomberg's work was largely uncensored. In the early stages of his career he cultivated a positive relationship with the Vatican, and he received approval from Pope Leo X for both the publication of Mikraot Gedolot as well as the Talmud. In later years Hebrew printing was viewed with mounting suspicion. By the end of his career, in the late 1540s, fears of censorship and church opposition caused Bomberg to release editions of the Talmud with backdated cover pages.

In 1548 Pope Paul III dispatched his ambassador to censure the venetian Hebrew publications, but Bomberg argued that ancient manuscripts were not to be altered, and successfully resisted papal pressure. Though the church did not successfully interfere with Bomberg's printing within his lifetime, by 1553 the Talmud was being burned in Italy and the church was actively seeking to restrict its publication and circulation.

== Other publications ==
In addition to the Mikraot Gedolot and the Babylonian Talmud, Bomberg's printing house published some two hundred other Hebrew books, many for the first time. Some of the more notable works published include:

- The Jerusalem Talmud (without commentaries)
- The Mishna
- Six editions of Midrashim
- A four-volume Karaite prayer book
- The Tosefta
- Responsa of Israel Isserlein (Terumat HaDeshen)
- Responsa of Joseph Colon Trabotto (Maharik)
- Responsa of Shlomo b. Aderet (Rashba)
- Responsa of Alfasi (Rif)
- The Yad HaChazakah (Maimonides' Mishneh Torah)
- Code of Moses b. Jacob of Coucy (Sefer Mitzvot Gadol)
- Code of Jacob b. Asher (Turim)

In addition to these works, Bomberg's publishing house released dozens of prayer books and commentaries on prayer, grammars, dictionaries and concordances and many more rabbinic, philosophic and ethical works.

== Legacy ==
Bomberg's printing became such a standard of quality that subsequent books are found advertising themselves to be printed “with Bomberg type."

The title page of a book of Psalms from 1765 – centuries after Bomberg's death – gives testament to the lasting gratitude Jewish communities felt toward him. The dedication reads: “Daniel Bomberg, whose name is known in the gates of justice […] was great among the Christians, producing gold from his purse in order to print from his printing press…”

In his book “Venetian Printers of Hebrew Books,” Joshua Bloch wrote:

"[A]s a pioneer in Hebrew printing in Venice [Bomberg] established so high a standard that no one has surpassed his work, even with the aid of modern mechanical improvements, and it is a question whether Hebrew printing has yet equaled the quality and taste shown in the productions of the Bomberg press."

On December 22, 2015, a well-preserved complete copy of the first edition of Bomberg's Babylonian Talmud, formerly contained in the Valmadonna Trust Library, sold at a Sotheby's auction for $9.3 million to Leon Black, a New York businessman who founded Apollo Global Management, a private equity firm.
