= Da'at Miqra =

Biblical commentary series

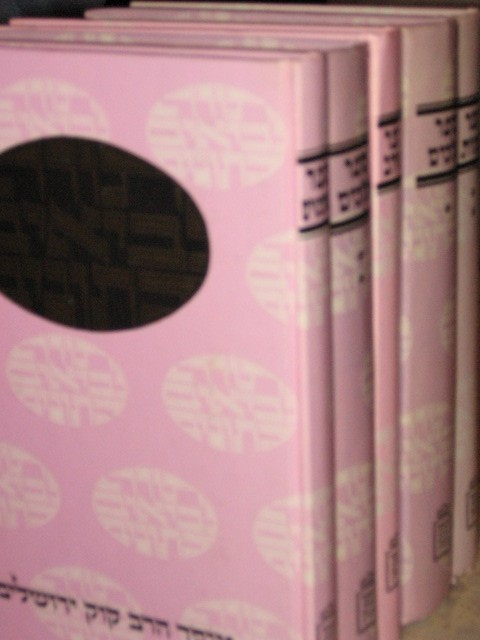
Da'at Miqra series

Da’at Miqra (Hebrew: דעת מקרא, lit. ''knowledge of Scripture'') is a series of volumes of Hebrew-language biblical commentary published by the Jerusalem-based Mossad Harav Kook and constitutes a cornerstone of contemporary Israeli Orthodox bible scholarship. The project, also referred to as Daat Mikra, was headed by Yehuda Kiel, who received the Israel Prize for his part in the enterprise.

== Overview ==
The singularity of Da’at Miqra lies in its combination of a traditional outlook and the findings of modern research. The Da’at Miqra editors have sought to present an interpretation based primarily upon Peshat — the direct, literal reading of the text — as opposed to Drash. They do so by incorporating geographic references, archaeological findings and textual analysis, presenting a clear link between the commentary's traditional approach and contemporary methodology. There has been some suggestion that the Da’at Miqra‘s dualistic approach reflects an underlying polemic against biblical criticism, without directly addressing the views and queries of bible critics but via a commentary aimed at debunking their methodology.

Editors of the series include Yehuda Elitzur of Bar-Ilan University, the International Bible Contest champion and Bible scholar Amos Hakham, Sha’ul Yisra’eli and Mordechai Breuer.

== Methodology and structure ==
Da’at Miqra relies upon the Aleppo Codex for its basic text. The commentary includes clarifications of difficult words and etymological references—particularly with regard to the names of locations mentioned—and contains various notes aimed at demonstrating, expanding upon or presenting alternate views on the text. Each book of the Tanakh is divided into parts, each of which is preceded by a description of the chapter’s division and literary style and a general explanation of the portion. In addition, each book contains a general introduction aimed at clarifying general issues within the text, such as the dating of its authorship, its historical background, parallels to other biblical books, an explanation of various repeating phrases or personas, and the like.
