= Mossad Harav Kook =

Religious research foundation and publishing house based in Jerusalem

Coordinates: 31.788798447°N 35.199072439°E

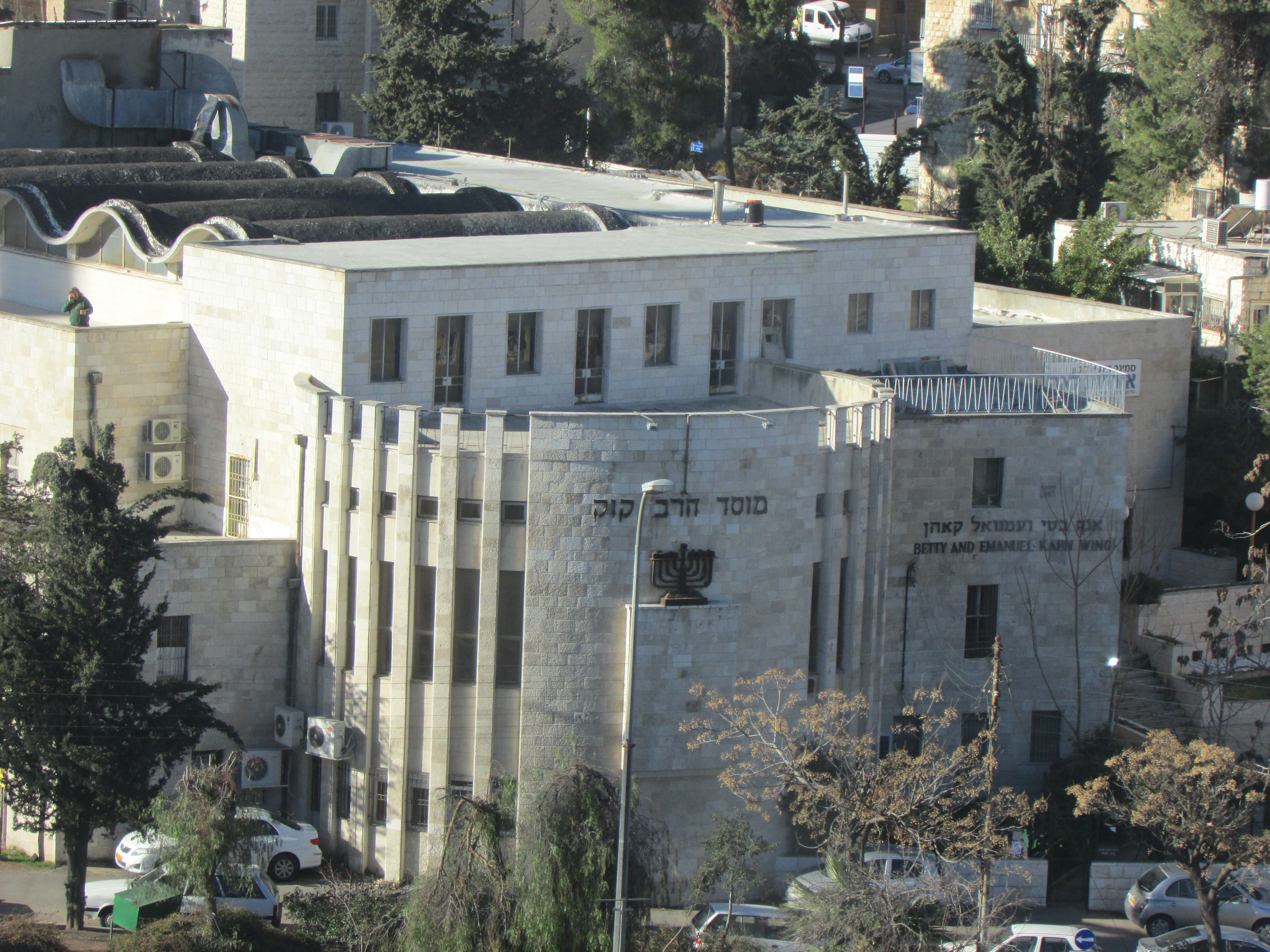
MhRK's building in Jerusalem.

Mossad HaRav Kook (Hebrew: מוסד הרב קוק; 'Rabbi Kook Institute') is a religious research foundation and publishing house based in Jerusalem.

Mossad Harav Kook is named after Abraham Isaac Kook, the first Ashkenazi chief rabbi of the British Mandatory Palestine, and was founded by Yehuda Leib Maimon in 1937.

More than 2000 books have been published by Mossad Harav Kook. Among their significant publications are the Daat Mikra TaNaKh series, authoritative editions of Hidushei Ritva and Rashba, Rambam LeAm (Mishna Torah and other works of Maimonides with nikud and a simple commentary), and the complete writings of Rabbi Abraham Isaac Kook. Among the institute's academic journals was Sinai (1937–2020), now discontinued, and which specialized in the fields of Torah and Jewish studies.

== See also ==
- Israeli literature
- Jewish literature
