= Andrea De Monte =

Rabbi and Jewish convert to Christianity

Andrea De Monte (né Joseph Ẓarfati; died before 1597) was a Moroccan Jewish convert to Christianity and missionary to the Jews at Rome.

== Life ==
Andrea(s) De Monte (Hebrew: אנדריאס די מונטי) or Andrea (Filippo) di Monti (more correctly del Monte), so named, in honour of Julius III, after he had accepted Christianity (before his conversion he was called R. Joseph Tsarpathi Ha-Alphasi (יוסף צרפתי האלפסי), was born in the early part of the 16th century at Fez, in Morocco (hence his second surname, האלפסי), and thus is sometimes called Joseph Moro, of Jewish parents, who were natives of France, which is indicated by his first surname (צרפתי, Gallus).

He emigrated to Rome, where, after exercising the office of chief rabbi for many years, and distinguishing himself as an expounder of the Mosaic law, he embraced Christianity about the year 1552, during the pontificate of Julius III. He at once consecrated his knowledge of Hebrew and rabbinical literature to the elucidation of the prophecies, with a view to bringing his brethren into the fold of the Roman Church.

Gregory XIII appointed Monte in 1576 preacher to the Hebrews of Rome in the oratory of the Holy Trinity; he was afterwards made Oriental interpreter to the pope, in which capacity he translated several ecclesiastical works from the Syriac and Arabic. He died in the beginning of the 17th century, or before 1597.

== Works ==
1. A voluminous work, entitled מבוכת היהודים, The Perplexity of the Jews, demonstrating both from the Scriptures and the ancient rabbinical writings all the doctrines of the Christian religion. Bartolocci, who found the MS. in loose sheets in the Neophyte College at Rome, carefully collated it and had it bound. He did not know that it ever was printed, but Fürst (Bibliotheca Judaica, iii, 544, s.v. Zarfati) states that it was published in Rome, 16—, 4to. However, Fabiano Fiocchi, in his work called Dialogo della Fede, almost entirely transcribed it, so that the Biblical student might derive all the advantages from it for Christological purposes.
2. An epistle to the various synagogues, written both in Hebrew and Italian, and entitled אגות שלום, Lettera di Pace, dated 12 January 1581. It treats of the coming of the true Messiah, and argues from the prophecies of the Old Testament, as well as from the works of the ancient rabbins, that he must have come long ago in the person of Jesus Christ (Rome, 16—, 4to). This learned work and the former one are very important contributions to the exposition of the Messianic prophecies, and to the understanding of the ancient Jewish views about the Messiah.

== See also ==
- History of Jewish conversion to Christianity
