= Kol Menachem =

American publishing house

Kol Menachem is an independent Chabad publishing house based in Crown Heights, Brooklyn, founded by philanthropist Meyer Gutnick and Rabbi Chaim Miller in 2000. Its goal is "to organize the teachings of Rabbi Menachem Mendel Schneerson and make them universally accessible and useful."

== The Gutnick Edition Chumash ==
Rabbi Chaim Miller wrote a Chumash with a translation that incorporates Rabbi Menachem Mendel Schneerson's "novel interpretation" of Rashi's commentary, which was delivered in a series of public talks at Farbrengens that began in 1964 and continued for more than 25 years, Many of which were printed in Likutei Sichot. The translation, called "The Gutnick Edition Chumash" after its sponsor, Meyer Gutnick, was published in a bilingual Hebrew-English edition that includes a running commentary anthologized from classic rabbinic texts.It also includes the haftarot, mystical insights called "Sparks of Chassidus", a summary of the mitzvot found in each Parashah according to Sefer ha-Chinuch, an essay on public reading of the Torah, and summary charts. It was Kol Menachem's first publication.

According to Miller's foreword, unlike most other translations, the Gutnick edition does not intersperse transliterations among the translations; this is intended to make the text more reader-friendly. However, the translation does includes Rashi's commentary in parentheses, and the foreword explains that these are Rashi's words and not a translation of the chumash.

In November 2002, the first volume of The Gutnick Edition Chumash was released. The inaugural issue published was Shemot, to coordinate with the then-current Torah readings. The publication of the 5-volume series was completed in 2006.

According to Rabbi Gutnick, the Chumash is perfect for those who are learning Chassidus for the first time, or who have never been exposed to formal Torah study. It is written in easy to understand English, making it understandable by people of all ages and backgrounds. And adds much for beginners to Chumash study (like the audience at Chabad houses across the world) and those familiar with the text.

The series is reported to have been quite successful: "The public reception was so overwhelming that the Kol Menachem staff was inspired to work 14-hour days to finish the project. ... Can you imagine how it feels to have phone calls, letters and emails flying in all day from people whose lives have literally been changed by the Chumash and are begging for more? For many thousands of people, it was their first exposure to the Rebbe’s teachings. Others tell us how it has enabled them to bring Torah study into their busy lives, and it has even inspired many to become baalei teshuvah. So we just had to pull out all the stops to get this project finished.”

== Kol Menachem Haggadah ==
In 2008 the Slager edition of the Haggadah was released by Kol Menachem, in two versions: according to the liturgy of Nusach Ashkenaz as well as Nusach Ari. The Kol Menachem commentaries are essays on the Haggadah written by Rabbi Schneerson and culled from his voluminous public addresses, then adapted into English. Each commentary is identified and fully annotated. In addition, the volume also incorporates an English question-and-answer running commentary by Rabbi Chaim Miller, integrating many classic commentators.

In 2009 The Kol Menachem Haggadah won the Benjamin Franklin award from the Independent Book Publishers Association.

== Other projects ==
In November 2006, Kol Menachem released a book of Haftarot with commentaries from the Rebbe.

Kol Menachem has begun a series on Maimonides' Thirteen Principles of Faith, which draws “from over 100 classic texts such as Talmud, Midrash, Jewish Philosophy, Halachic codes and the works of Kabbalah and Chassidus (with special emphasis on the teachings of the Lubavitcher Rebbe)." These teachings have been anthologized into a series of 28 lessons and has 446 pages.

Kol Menachem has begun the Leviev edition of the Gutnick Chumash, which is a rendition of the Gutnick Chumash in Hebrew sponsored by philanthropist Lev Leviev. Thus far, the books of Bereshit, Shemot, Vayikra, and Devarim have been released.

Kol Menachem has launched an online classroom for Jews on the go. "Torah in Ten" provides insightful conversations on the weekly Torah portion. The class includes interesting commentaries from renowned historical figures as well as modern views, in addition to thought provoking and inspiring questions. Torah in Ten takes place every week, for ten minutes.

The class is facilitated by Kol Menachem's Editor in Chief, Rabbi Chaim Miller.
