= Obadiah ben Jacob Sforno =

Italian rabbi and scholar

- Born: c. 1470/1475; Cesena
- Died: c. 1550; Bologna

Philosophical work
- Era: Medieval philosophy
- Region: Jewish philosophy
- Notable students: Johann Reuchlin

Ovadia ben Jacob Sforno (Note: Sometimes spelled Obadja Sforno.) (Hebrew: עובדיה ספורנו; c. 1470/1475 – c. 1550) was an Italian rabbi, biblical commentator, philosopher, and physician. A member of the Sforno family, he was born in Cesena between 1470 and 1475 and died in Bologna in 1549 or 1550.

== Biography ==
After acquiring a thorough knowledge of Hebrew, Rabbinic literature, mathematics, and philosophy in his native town, he went to Rome to study medicine. There, his learning won him a prominent place among scholars; when Johann Reuchlin was in Rome during 1498–1500 and desired to perfect his knowledge of Hebrew literature, Cardinal Domenico Grimani advised him to apply to study with Sforno. During the two years Reuchlin was in Rome, Sforno taught him Hebrew.

Equally high was Sforno's reputation as a casuist. Meir ben Isaac Katzenellenbogen consulted him on legal questions, and Joseph Colon invoked his authority. At the request of Israel ben Jehiel Ashkenazi, the then-chief rabbi of Rome, Sforno issued a decision in 1519 on the case of Donina, daughter of Samuel Sarfati, the renowned physician of Pope Leo X. In about 1525, Sforno left Rome and led a wandering life for a while. From several letters of the period addressed to his brother, Hananeel, who lived in Bologna, it seems Sforno was in poor circumstances. Finally, he settled in Bologna, where he founded a yeshiva, which he conducted until his death.

== Works ==
Sforno was a prolific writer, primarily focused on Jewish biblical exegesis. His exegetical work demonstrates a commitment to the literal meaning of the text and a consistent avoidance of mystical interpretations. He was recognized for his discernment in selecting interpretations from earlier exegetes, including Rashi, Abraham ibn Ezra, the Rashbam, and Nachmanides, while frequently offering original insights that reflected his extensive philological expertise. His works include commentaries on the Torah (1567); Song of Songs and Ecclesiastes, with the latter dedicated to Henry II of France; the Psalms (1586); Mishpaṭ Ẓedeḳ (מִשְׁפַּט צֶדֶק, 'Just Judgment') on the Book of Job (1589); and on the books of Jonah, Habakkuk, and Zechariah, published in 1724 alongside David ibn Hin's Likkute Shoshannim (לִקּוּטֵי שׁוֹשַׁנִּים, 'Collected Roses'). He also authored Kavanot ha-Torah (כַּוָּנוֹת הַתּוֹרָה, 'Intentions [of] the Torah'), which serves as a preface to his Torah commentary; it was published in 1567 posthumously.

Sforno also contributed to religious philosophy. In his work Or Ammim (אוֹר עַמִּים, 'Light [of] Nations'), published in Bologna in 1537, he sought to refute Aristotle's theories regarding the eternity of matter, divine omniscience, and the universality of the soul, as well as other Aristotelian positions he considered incompatible with religious doctrine. In the introduction, Sforno notes that he was motivated to write this treatise because even Maimonides had asserted the correctness of Aristotle's theories concerning the sublunary world. Sforno translated Or Ammim into Latin and sent it to Henry II of France. The Latin edition was published in 1548.

== See also ==
- Jewish commentaries on the Bible

== Bibliography ==
- Saverio Campanini, Un intellettuale ebreo del Rinascimento. 'Ovadyah Sforno e i suoi rapporti con i cristiani, in M.G. Muzzarelli (ed.), Verso l'epilogo di una convivenza. Gli ebrei a Bologna nel XVI secolo, La Giuntina, Firenze 1996, pp. 98–128.
- Saverio Campanini, ‘Ovadyah Sforno un banchiere filosofo ed esegeta, in M. Mengozzi (ed.), Cesena ebraica. Un percorso fra carte e codici, Biblioteca Malatestiana, Cesena 2019, pp. 103–118.
