= Barzillai ben Baruch Jabez =

Turkish-Jewish theologist

Barzillai ben Baruch Jabez was a Turkish Talmudist of the seventeenth and eighteenth centuries.

Jabez was a well-respected Talmudist and had many pupils, among whom were his son-in-law Judah Ashkenazi, and Isaac Nuñez Belmonte. Among Jabez's works was Leshon 'Arummim, published in Smyrna in 1749, which contained annotations to Elijah Mizrachi's supercommentary on Rashi's commentary on the Pentateuch and on passages in Maimonides.
