= Menachem Cohen (scholar) =

Israeli scholar

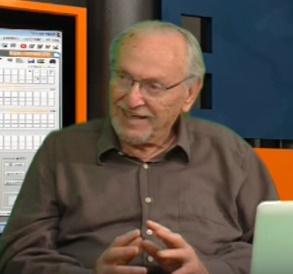
- Born: August 4, 1928 (age 98)
- Occupation: Scholar
- Employer: Bar-Ilan University
- Known for: Correcting approximately 1500 Biblical errors relating to grammar and accentuation

Menachem Cohen (born August 4, 1928) is an Israeli scholar who worked for over 30 years to correct grammatical errors in the Hebrew Bible. In 1525 Jacob Ben-Hayim attempted to do this, but he did not have extensive manuscripts available to him. Cohen's work demonstrates the extent to which Judaism venerates every tiny biblical calligraphic notation, to ensure that worldwide communities use exactly the same version of the Old Testament.

== Background ==
According to Jewish law, a Torah is invalid for public reading if even a single letter is incorrect or misplaced, for Jewish law considers each letter as indispensable.

In 1525, in Venice, Jacob Ben-Hayim, editor of the second edition of the Mikraot Gedolot, took it upon himself to fix grammatical errors in the Hebrew Bible. Ben-Hayim's version unified Judaism's varying texts and commentaries on the Bible under one umbrella, and it is this version that has remained the standard version used by generations to this day. However, Ben-Hayim had to rely on inferior manuscripts and commentaries, which caused numerous inaccuracies to appear in his version, and these were only magnified in subsequent editions.

== Mission ==
In 2012, 84-year-old Israeli Judaic scholar Menachem Cohen of the Bible department at Bar-Ilan University finished a 30-year mission to fix all known textual errors in the Hebrew Bible to produce a "truly definitive edition of the Old Testament." The last volume of the printed version was published in 2019.

Cohen's edits focused mainly on grammatical errors, such as fixing the accent of a vowel, the letter in a word, or fixing biblical symbols used for accentuation and cantillation (te'amim) which were copied down incorrectly centuries ago. Cohen used thousands of medieval manuscripts to identify approximately 1,500 inaccuracies in the Hebrew Bible, which he corrected in a 21-volume set. The errors that Cohen found do not alter the meaning of the Bible or have any bearing on its stories. Most errors were not found in the Torah (or Five Books of Moses), which does not include vowel markings or cantillation notations, but rather in the final two-thirds of the Tanakh. Cohen also included the most comprehensive commentaries available, most notably that of Rashi.

Cohen primarily relied on the Aleppo Codex, a thousand-year-old text considered to be the most accurate copy of the Bible. Cohen had a major argument with Mordechai Breuer, where Cohen argues that we need to follow the Aleppo Codex exactly (except for obvious mistakes), as opposed to the position of Breuer that we should amend certain vocalizations to make the text more readable.

In 1947, a Syrian mob burned the synagogue that was protecting the Codex, and the Codex briefly disappeared before most of it was smuggled out into Israel a decade later.

Cohen has not called for any changes in how traditional Torah scrolls are written, as this would likely result in a "firestorm of objection and criticism," but rather aimed for accuracy in versions used by Hebrew readers for studying.

Cohen said:

The people of Israel took upon themselves, at least in theory, one version of the Bible, down to its last letter...

It was amazing to me that for 500 years, people didn't sense the errors. They just assumed that everything was fine, but in practice everything was not fine...

I want the Bible to be user-friendly. Today, we can create sources of information and searches that allow you to get an answer to everything you are wondering...

Cohen also stressed that unity and accuracy in the Hebrew Bible were important in order to distinguish the sacred Jewish text from those used by break-away sects, such as the Christians and Samaritans.

In addition, Cohen launched a digital version, with the help of his son Shmuel, a computer programmer, which he hopes will become a benchmark of the Israeli education system.
