= Jacob ben Hayyim ibn Adonijah =

Jewish scholar and printer

Jacob ben Hayyim ben Isaac ibn Adonijah or Jacob ben Chayyim (c. 1470 – before 1538), was a scholar of the Masoretic (𝕸) textual notes on the Hebrew Bible, exegete and printer. Born in Tunis and thus sometimes called al-Tunisi in Arabic, he left his native country to escape the persecutions that broke out there at the beginning of the sixteenth century. After residing in Rome and Florence, he settled in Venice, where he was engaged as corrector of the Hebrew press of Daniel Bomberg. Later in life he converted to Catholicism.

Jacob's name is known chiefly in connection with his edition of the Mikraot Gedolot (1524–25), which he supplied with Masoretic notes and an introduction which discusses the 𝕸, qere and ketib, and the discrepancies between the Talmudists and the 𝕸. The value of his activity as a Masorete was recognized even by Elia Levita, who, however, often finds fault with his selections. The Rabbinical Bible is believed to be the source text used by the translators of the King James Version.

Jacob's introduction to the Rabbinical Bible was translated into Latin by Claude Capellus in 1667, and into English by Christian David Ginsburg (Longman, 1865). Jacob also wrote a dissertation on the Targum, prefixed to the 1527 and 1543-44 editions of the Torah, and published extracts from Moses of London's Darke ha-Niqqud we-ha-Negginoth (דרכי הניקוד והנגינות), a work on niqqud, including cantillation. He revised the editio princeps of the Jerusalem Talmud (1523); Maimonides' Mishneh Torah; and of many other works from Bomberg's press.

== Works ==
- C.D. Ginsburg, Jacob ben Chajim ibn Adonijah's Introduction to the Rabbinic Bible, London: Longman, 1865; reprinted with the Masoret ha-Masoret of Elias Levita, New York: KTAV, 1968.
- Jacob Ben Chajim Ibn Adonijah's Introduction to the Rabbinic Bible, Ginsburg, London, 1867;
  Digital Copy: Ginsburg, 1867: Jacob Ben Chajim Ibn Adonijah's Introduction to the Rabbinic Bible.

== Jewish Encyclopedia Bibliography ==
- De Rossi, Dizionario, p. 322;
- Nepi-Ghirondi, Toledot Gedole Yisrael, p. 197;
- Christian D. Ginsburg, Massoret ha-Massoret, pp. 33–34, London, 1867;
- Oẓar Neḥmad, iii.112;
- Steinschneider, Cat. Bodl. col. 1205;
- Fürst, Bibl. Jud. iii.451.
