= Amos Hakham =

Biblical scholar (1921–2012)

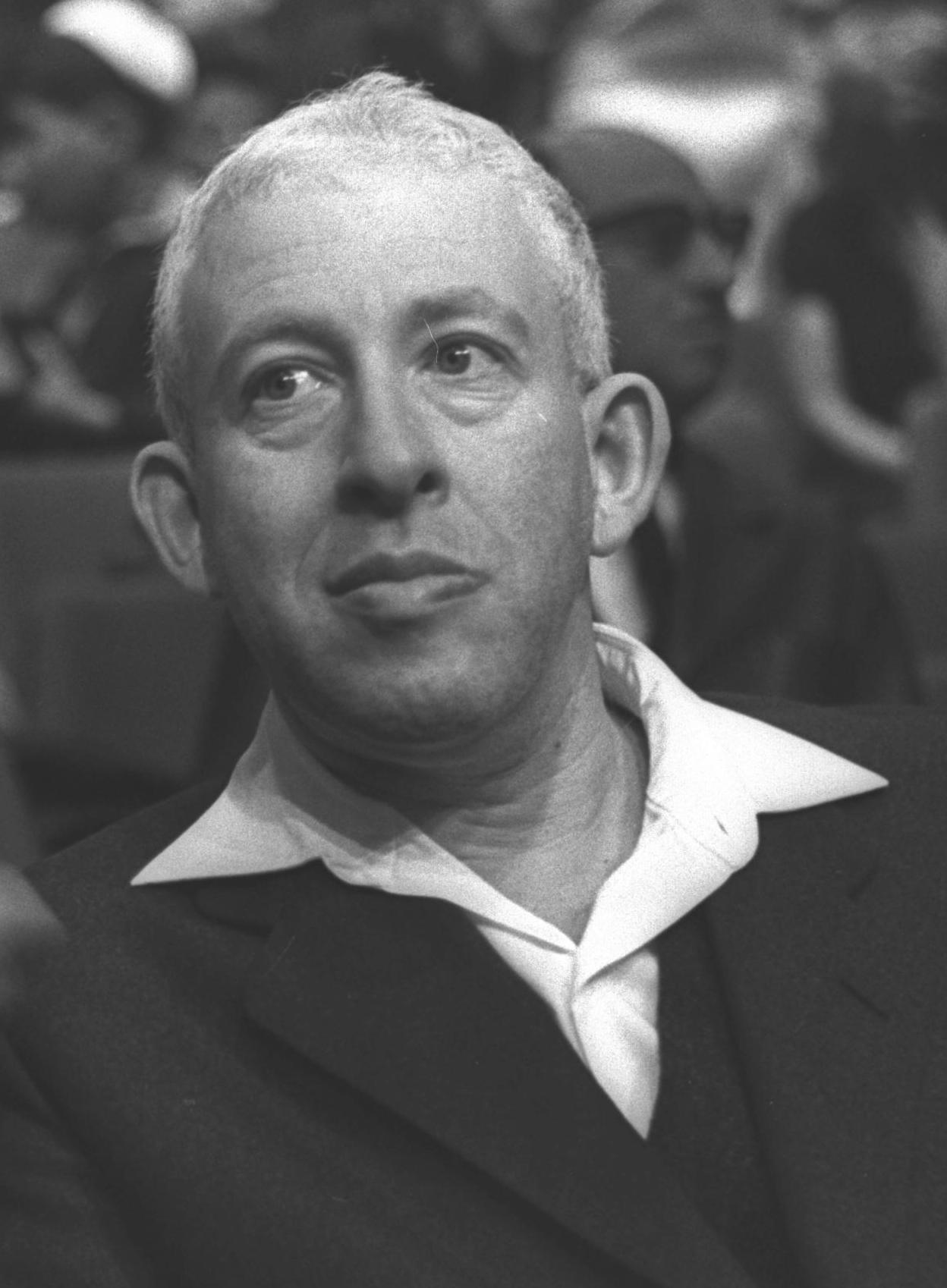
Amos Hakham, May 1965

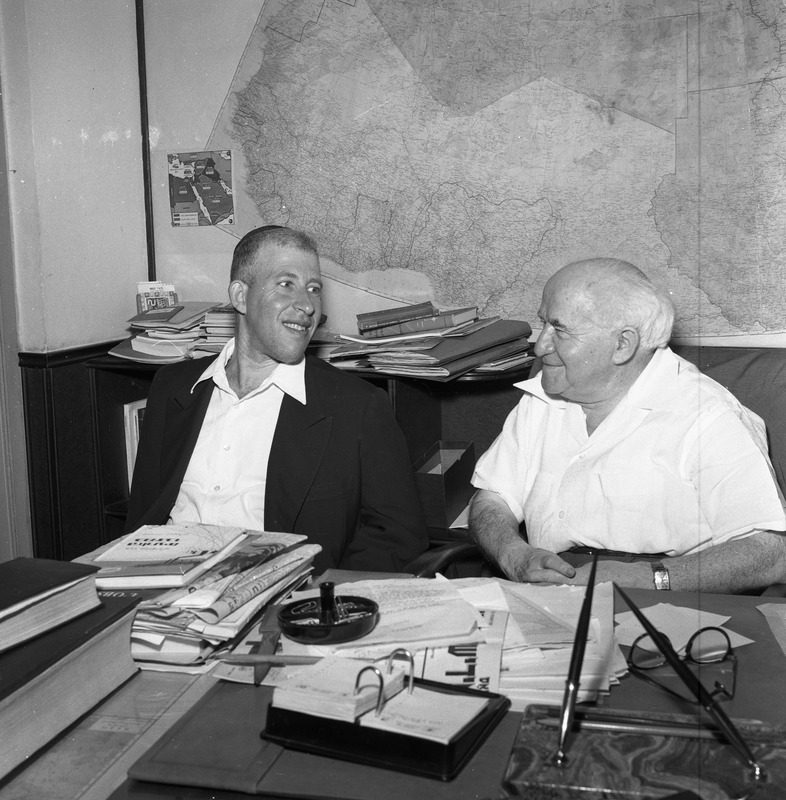
Amos Hakham after winning the 1958 bible contest, with Prime Minister David Ben-Gurion

Amos Hakham (Hebrew: עמוס חכם; 1921 – 2 August 2012) was the first winner of the International Bible Contest, who went on to become a Bible scholar and editor of the Da'at Miqra Bible commentary. He is the father of Corpus Papyrorum Judaicarum scholar Noah Hacham.

== Biography ==
Amos Hakham was born in Jerusalem in 1921 to Dr. Noah Hakham and Naomi (née Shapiro). Hakham's father studied at the University of Vienna and the Jewish Theological Seminary of Vienna (graduated in 1912) and earned a doctorate. He moved to Jerusalem in 1913 and founded the Seminary for Teachers of the Mizrachi movement (now Lifshitz College of Education). He taught Bible there. Hakham's mother was a pharmacist and a medic in Kvutzat Kinneret and in Kibbutz Degania. Amos was their only son.

Due to a fall in infancy, Hakham had speech difficulties. His father chose home schooling to help him avoid ridicule. His mother died when he was 15 years old. When he was 22, after his father died, he was hired as a clerk at the Institute for the Blind in Jerusalem in return for meals and pocket money. During his spare time he studied the Bible. He completed his Bagrut matriculation exams at this time. In addition to his clerical duties, he tutored blind students studying at regular high schools in Jerusalem and helped to publish a Bible in Braille.

== 1958 National and International Bible Contest ==
The turnaround in his life occurred in 1958, when the first International Bible Contest was announced. It was to be held on both a national and international level. Some of Amos' neighbors in Sha'arei Hesed, who knew of his erudition in the Bible, encouraged him to enter the contest.

Hakham was a star of the national contest, which was held at the International Convention Center in Jerusalem on 4 August 1958, and broadcast live on the radio. He was so poor he had to borrow a suit for the contest from a friend. The Prime Minister, David Ben-Gurion, who was an avid Bible enthusiast, attended the contest and at the end of it handed the prize to Hakham. After Hakham won the national competition, he went on to win the international competition held in Jerusalem on 19 August.

At the time, there was no TV in Israel and Kol Yisrael (Israel's public radio service) broadcast only on one radio channel. The International Bible Contest thus attracted a very wide audience across the country. After his victory the Hebrew-language daily newspaper Davar crowned him as the "most popular man in Israel, even more than Hodorov". He was also chosen as the Person of the year of the newspaper "HaOlam HaZeh".

Hakham, who had always been shy, suddenly became the center of national and international interest due to his vast knowledge and personal story. After the contest, Prime Minister David Ben-Gurion invited him to his office. The Prime Minister accompanied him on a tour around the country and he was invited to teach Bible at the Ayanot agricultural school, and elsewhere. When Hakham married a few years later, Ben-Gurion attended the ceremony. In 1963 his first son Noah - named for Amos' father - was born.

In his final years, he lived in Efrat.He died on 2 August 2012, at the age of 91.

== Professional career ==
Hakham decided to study Bible academically, enrolling at the Hebrew University. He earned his bachelor’s degree with distinction, followed by advanced research leading to a master’s thesis on Jewish legal texts from the Second Temple period. His doctoral dissertation, completed in the early 1950s, focused on Biblical exegesis during the Second Temple era.

Upon completing his studies, he became known as a writer and Bible scholar. He began lecturing on biblical history, Jewish law, and Middle Eastern studies. His early publications focused on editing and interpreting ancient texts. His works garnered attention for their depth, rigor, and critical approach, positioning him as an emerging authority in Jewish studies. His works are considered a synthesis of scholarship and faithfulness to Jewish tradition.

He contributed eight volumes of the Da'at Miqra Bible commentary. This widely referenced work incorporates geographic data, archaeological findings and textual analysis, and under Hakham's influence, combines a traditional approach with contemporary methodology. He also wrote various articles for the Encyclopaedia Hebraica.
