= Shabbethai Bass =

Shabbethai ben Joseph Bass (Hebrew: שבתי בן יוסף; 1641–1718), also known by the family name Strom, born in Kalisz, was the founder of Jewish bibliography and author of the Siftei Chachamim (pronounced [/sifˈtei χaχaˈmim/]; שְׂפָתֵי חֲכָמִים, 'Lips of the Wise') supercommentary on Rashi's commentary on the Torah.

== Life ==
In the wake of the death of his parents (both of whom were victims of the persecutions at Kalisz in 1655), the Russo-Swedish War (1656–1658) prompted Bass to emigrate to Prague. His Talmud teacher there was Meïr Wärters (d. 1693); Loeb Shir ha-Shirim instructed him in singing. He was appointed bass singer in the celebrated Altneuschule of Prague, being called, from his position, "Bass," "Bassista," or "Meshorer." In his leisure time, he devoted himself to literary pursuits, more especially to improving the instruction of the young.

=== As printer ===
Between 1674 and 1679 Bass traveled through Poland, Germany, and the Dutch Republic, stopping in such cities as Głogów, Kalisz, Krotoszyn, Leszno, Poznań, Worms, and Amsterdam—major centers of Jewish scholarship. He finally settled in Amsterdam in 1679, entering into friendly and scholarly relations with the eminent men of the German and the Portuguese-Spanish communities. That city was the center of Jewish printing and publishing, and Bass, becoming thoroughly familiar with the business, resolved to devote himself entirely to issuing Jewish books. With a keen eye for the practical, he perceived that the eastern part of Germany was a suitable place for a Jewish printing establishment. The literary productivity of the Polish-Lithuanian Jews was at this time obliged to seek an outlet in Amsterdam or Prague almost exclusively; Bass accordingly fixed upon Breslau as a suitable place for his purposes, on account of its vicinity to the Polish frontier, and of the large commerce carried on between Breslau and Poland. Hence, after five years' residence, he left Amsterdam, going, it seems, first to Vienna to obtain a license from the imperial government. The negotiations between Bass and the magistrates of Breslau occupied nearly four years, and not until 1687 or 1688 did he receive permission to set up a Hebrew printing-press.

=== At Dyhernfurth ===
Thereupon, he settled at Dyhernfurth, a small town near Breslau founded shortly before 1663, whose owner, Herr von Glaubitz, glad to have a large establishment on his estate, was very well disposed toward Bass. To more easily obtain Jewish workers, Bass united the small band of printers, typesetters, and workmen who had followed him to Dyhernfurth, for whose needs he cared, and acquired a cemetery site as early as 1689.

The first book from Bass's press appeared in the middle of August, 1689, the first customer being, as he had anticipated, a Polish scholar, Rabbi Samuel ben Uri of Woydyslaw, whose commentary Beit Shmuel on the Shulhan Arukh, Even Ha'ezer, was printed at Dyhernfurth. The books published the following year were either works by Polish scholars or liturgical collections intended for Polish Jews. Being issued in a correct, neat, and pleasing form, they easily found buyers, especially at the fairs of Breslau, where Bass himself sold his books.

But the ill-will against Jews, apparent since 1697 in Silesia, and especially at Breslau, greatly injured Bass's establishment; he was himself forbidden to stay in Breslau (July 20, 1706). Another stroke of misfortune was the partial destruction of his establishment by fire in 1708. To this were added domestic difficulties. When an older man married a second time, to the great dissatisfaction of his family and neighbors, his wife was a young girl. He finally transferred his business to his only son, Joseph, in 1711. His trials culminated in his sudden arrest, April 13, 1712, on the charge of having spread abroad incendiary speeches against all divine and civic government. The Jesuits, who looked with an evil eye upon Bass's undertaking, had endeavored, in a letter to the magistrate of Breslau, as early as July 15, 1694, to have the sale of Hebrew books interdicted, on the ground that such works contained "blasphemous and irreligious words"; and they had succeeded. As the magistrate saw, however, that the confiscated books contained no objectionable matter, they were restored to Bass.

In 1712, the Jesuit Father Franz Kolb, teacher of Hebrew at the University of Prague, succeeded in having Bass and his son, Joseph, arrested, and their books confiscated. The book of devotions, Nathan Hannover's Sha'are Zion (Gates of Zion), which Bass reprinted after it had already gone through several editions, was transformed in the learned father's hands into a blasphemous work directed against Christianity and Christians. Bass would have fared ill had not the censor Pohl, who had been commissioned to examine the contents of the books, been both faithful and competent. In consequence of his decision, Bass was released after ten weeks' imprisonment, at first on bail, and then absolutely. The last years of his life were devoted to the second edition of his bibliographic manual, which he intended to issue in enlarged and revised form. He died July 21, 1718, at Krotoschin without completing the work.

== Literary activity ==
Bass's works have the constant characteristic of answering practical needs.

=== Siftei Yeshenim ===
Bass's chief work is his bibliographical manual Siftei Yeshenim ('Lips of the Sleepers'; compare Shir haShirim Rabbah to 7:10). This work contains a list of 2,200 Hebrew books, in the alphabetical order of the titles, conscientiously giving the author, place of printing, year, and size of each book, as well as a short summary of its contents. The majority of the books described he knew at first hand; the description of the others he borrowed from the works of Buxtorf and Giulio Bartolocci (from the latter only in the first part).

Bass's work is distinguished not only by its brevity and accuracy, but by an entirely original feature, in respect to which he had no predecessor, and almost no successor; namely, a classification of the entire Jewish literature, as far as he knew it. He divides the whole into two chief groups, Biblical and post-Biblical, and each group again into ten subdivisions. Thus, dictionaries, grammars, and translations form a subdivision of the Biblical group; while Talmud commentaries and novellæ are included in the Talmudic group. Although this classification is still very superficial and primitive, it indicates its author's wide knowledge and astonishing range of reading. In addition to the list and classification of the books, Bass gives an alphabetical index of authors, including one of the Tannaim, Amoraim, Saboraim, and Geonim.

Bass's introduction to his work is most characteristic of the spirit prevailing among German Jews at that time: he cites ten "religious reasons" for the usefulness of his work. Not only was Bass's undertaking new to the German Jews, but it also appeared strange to them; only the Portuguese Jews of Amsterdam, who had a leaning toward methods and systems, knew how to appreciate him. Christian scholars, however, were at once impressed by the scholarship, style, usefulness, and reliability of the bibliography. Latin as well as German translations, some of which are still extant in manuscript, were undertaken by Christian Orientalists. The greatest proof of Bass's merit lies in the fact that Johann Christoph Wolf's Bibliotheca Hebræa is based chiefly on the Siftei Yeshenim.

=== Siftei Chachamim ===
His work Siftei Chachamim is a supercommentary to Rashi's commentary to the Pentateuch and the five Megillot. Its general method is to identify the difficulty which made Rashi's comments necessary. Much of its material is based on earlier supercommentaries such as that of Elijah Mizrachi; it summed up with brevity and clearness the best work of fifteen previous supercommentaries on Rashi.

Even today the book is considered a useful aid toward understanding and appreciating Rashi. It is considered so essential that there exists a summary work on it, called Ikar Siftei Chachamim. This work generally leaves out the questions that the Siftei Chachamim raises on Rashi, and simply sums up his idea that he culled from the Rashi in about a sentence or two equivalent to the paragraph-length entries in the Siftei Chachamim. (One example is Weinfeld, Joseph Halevi Shalom. Chumash Orech Yamim. Jerusalem: Orech Publishers, 1997.)

=== Other works ===
In 1669 he reprinted Moses Sartels' Yiddish glossary on the Bible, adding a grammatical preface, a work intended to supply the lack of grammatical knowledge among teachers of the young, and to furnish the latter with the correct German rendering in translating the Bible. Bass was greatly interested in improving the instruction of the young, and recommended the German-Polish Jews to imitate the methods of instruction obtaining in the Portuguese community of Amsterdam, describing in detail their curriculum. (His subcommentary Siftei Hachamim is also intended for elementary instruction.)

His itinerary, entitled Massekhet Derek Eretz, is a short treatise on the roads of the country (Amsterdam, 1680); the book, written in Yiddish, contains also tables of all the current coins, measures, and weights in European countries, and a list of routes, post connections, and distances.
