= Moses Capsali =

Ottoman rabbi

Moses ben Elijah Capsali (Hebrew: משה בן אליהו קפשאלי) (1495–1420) was Hakham Bashi (Chief Rabbi) of the Ottoman Empire.

== Biography ==
Moses ben Elijah Capsali was born in Venetian-held Crete in 1420. When he was a young man, Capsali left his native island in order to study at the German yeshivot. He is next mentioned as rabbi of Constantinople about 1450; but he became prominent only during the reign of Sultan Mehmed II, who appointed him chief rabbi of Ottoman Empire. The sultan thought so much of the rabbi that he assigned to him a seat in the divan beside the grand mufti, the religious head of the Muslims, and above the patriarch of the Christians.

Capsali held various offices, which included the supervision of the taxes of the Jews, and the appointment of rabbis, and he even acted as a civil judge. It is said that the sultan's respect for the rabbi was because, disguised as a civilian, Mehmed II was present one day while Capsali was rendering his decisions; and he assured himself that the rabbi was incorruptible and impartial in his judgments.

When the sultan undertook to improve the moral conditions of some parts of Constantinople, it was said that this endeavor was prompted by the rabbi. It is certain that Capsali dealt very severely with Jewish youths who, intimate with the janissaries, imitated them in leading un-Jewish and immoral lives. Some of these youths, enraged by the corporal punishment he had inflicted on them, attempted to kill him during a street riot in 1481, and he escaped only by flight.

Capsali's associations with Bayazid, the son and successor of Mehmed II, were equally pleasant; and Bayazid's friendliness toward the Jews, that became especially evident in the ready reception of the Spanish exiles fleeing the Spanish Inquisition, must be ascribed in no small measure to Capsali's influence.

Capsali died about 1495 in Istanbul; he was succeeded as Hakham Bashi by Elijah Mizrachi.
