= Felix Pratensis =

Felix Pratensis (Felice da Prato) (died 1539 in Rome) was an Italian Sephardic Jewish scholar who converted to the Catholic Church. He is known for his collaboration with the Flemish printer Daniel Bomberg on the first printed Hebrew Biblia Rabbinica (Veneta) of 1517/8.

He received an education and acquired three languages. In 1518, he converted to Christianity. Having become an Augustinian friar, he devoted himself to proselytizing, especially to Jews.

Before his conversion, Felix published a Latin translation of the Psalms entitled Psalterium ex Hebræo ad Verbum Translatum, Venice, 1515.
