= Elijah Mizrachi =

Talmudist and posek

Elijah Mizrachi (Hebrew: אליהו מזרחי) (c. 1455 – 1525 or 1526) was a Talmudist and posek, an authority on Halakha, and a mathematician. He is best known for his Sefer ha-Mizrachi, a supercommentary on Rashi's commentary on the Torah. He is also known as Re'em (רא״ם), the Hebrew acronym for "Rabbi Elijah Mizrachi", coinciding with the Biblical name of an animal, the re'em.

Mizrachi was born in Constantinople; he was a Romaniote Jew, meaning that his family was local Greek-speaking, and not from the Spanish exile. He studied under Elijah ha-Levi and Judah Minz of Padua. As a young man, he distinguished himself as a Talmudist, yet he also studied the secular sciences, particularly mathematics and astronomy; he is said to have been the first to derive a method for the extraction of the cube root. He also knew Byzantine Greek and Arabic.

Mizrachi succeeded Moses Capsali (on his death c. 1495) as Hakham Bashi "Grand Rabbi" of the Ottoman Empire; he held this position for the rest of his life. As Hakham Bashi he was known for his mild attitude toward the Karaites, an attitude inherited from his teacher Elijah ha-Levi; he even held that it was permissible to teach them Talmud.

== Works ==
Sefer ha-Mizrachi is a supercommentary on Rashi's commentary on the Torah. It is counted in its own right as among the most important commentaries on the Torah. It was first published in Venice in 1527 after Mizrachi's death, by his son Israel. Mizrachi himself considered his commentary on Rashi the most important of his works (Responsa, Nos. 5, 78). The work shows Rashi's Talmudic and midrashic sources, and elucidates all obscure passages. It was written, partially, to defend Rashi from the strictures of the later commentators, particularly Nachmanides. A compendium by Jacob Marcaria was published under the title Kitzur Mizrachi (Trento, 1561), and later, one by Isaac ha-Kohen of Ostroh, entitled Mattenat 'Ani (Prague, 1604-9). Several commentaries have been written on Mizrachi, including Yeri'ot Shlomo by Solomon Luria (Maharshal), a supercommentary on Sefer ha-Mizrachi by Barzillai ben Baruch Jabez, and strictures on the work by Samuel Edels, (Maharsha).

Other works of Torah by Mizrachi include:

- Tosefet Semag, a hiddush on the Sefer Mitzvot Gadol ("Semag") of Moses ben Jacob of Coucy.
- A collection of responsa - Teshuvot Re'em; see History of responsa in Judaism: Fifteenth century.

Mizrachi also authored works on mathematics and science:

- Sefer ha-Mispar on arithmetic, and a commentary to Ptolemy's Almagest, an important text on astronomy. (Melekhet ha-Mispar; is a similar work attributed to Mizrachi, which additionally contains a chapter on chess).
- A commentary on Euclid's Elements, a fundamental mathematics text.
