= Soferet (disambiguation) =

Soferet may refer to:

- Sofer, a ritual scribe in Judaism
- Soferet (film), a 2006 Canadian documentary about Aviel Barclay, a female scribe

== See also ==
- Sofer (disambiguation)
