= List of sofers =

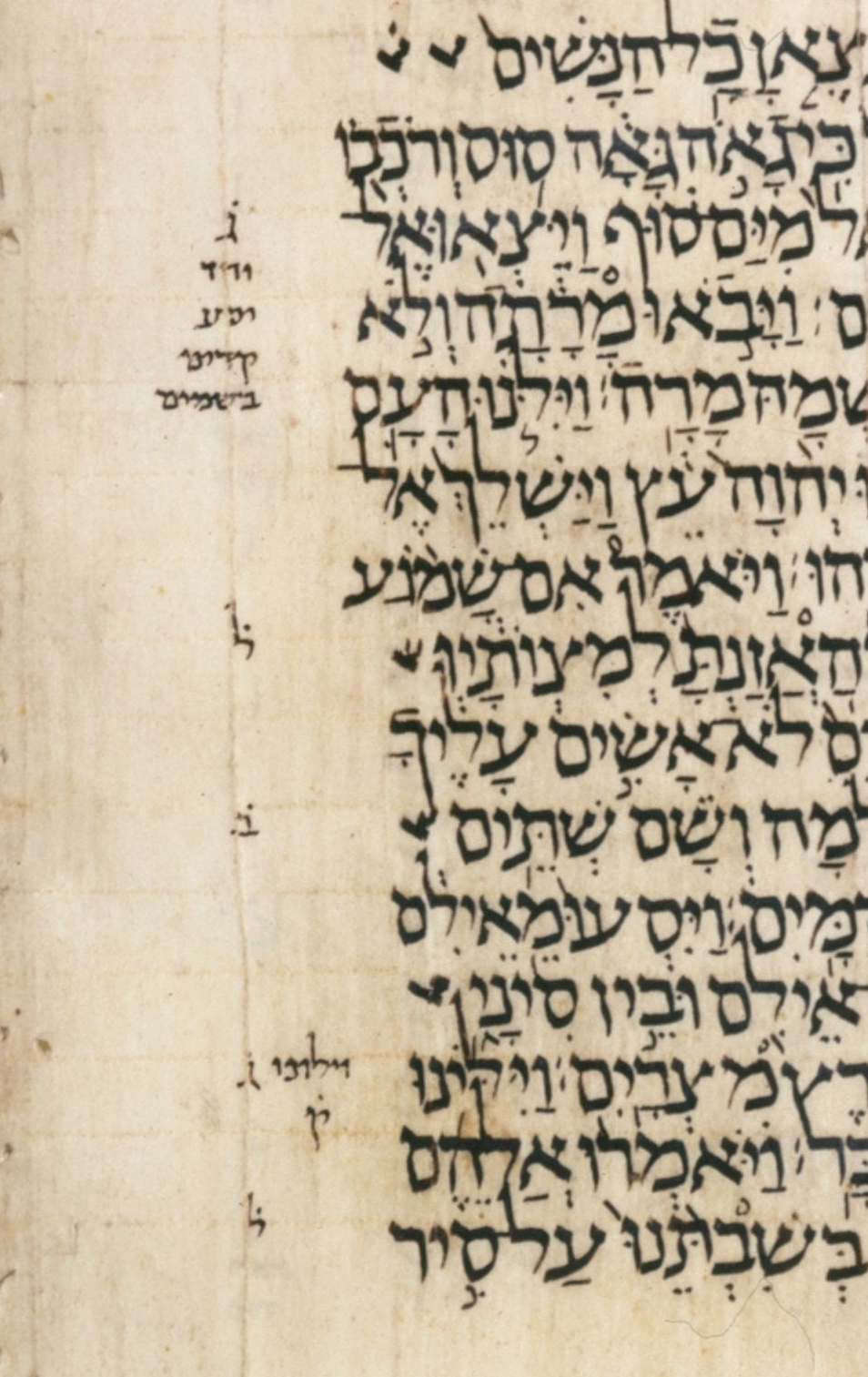
Hebrew

A List of sofers, (or the female soferet).

== Alphabetic list ==
| Sofer | Time-period | Notes |
|---|---|---|
| Ezra the Scribe | 5th century B.C. | Prophet and leader of the Jewish nation |
| Baruch ben Neriah | 6th century B.C. | Scribe for the Prophet Jeremiah |
| Aaron ben Moses ben Asher | 10th century | Tiberian scribe |
| Azaria Piccio | 17th century | Venice, Republic of Venice |
| Jekuthiel Sofer | 18th century | Amsterdam |
| Tzvi Sofer | 18th century | Baal Shem Tov's student and personal sofer |
| Samuel Benjamin Sofer | 19th century | Pressburg, Hungary |
| Abraham Sternhartz | Late 19th/early 20th century | Ukraine |
| Menachem Davidovitch | 20th and 21st centuries | Most influential scribe of his generation (Post-war) |
| Mordechai Pinchas | 20th and 21st centuries | UK modern orthodox scribe www.sofer.co.uk |
| Aviel Barclay | 20th and 21st centuries | Canada, first certified soferet of modern times |
| Jen Taylor Friedman | 20th and 21st centuries | First Torah by a soferet of modern times |
| Julie Seltzer | 20th and 21st centuries | America, first Torah by an American soferet |
| Yaakov Klein (YK) | 20th and 21st centuries | Orthodox sofer. Safrut blog articles and Instagram |

== See also ==
- List of Jews in religion
