= Shemuel Shelomo Boyarski =

Rabbi Shemuel Shelomo ben Moshe Meir Boyarski (Hebrew: שמואל שלמה בוירסקי; around 1820 – after 1894), known as "Rashash Boyarski" (רש"ש בויארסקי), after the initials of his personal names, was a Lithuanian rabbinical scholar and ritual scribe who lived in Jerusalem, as part of the Old Yishuv. He was the author of the book Ammudei Shesh (עמודי שש), a rabbinical work on various Jewish religious topics, which he published in Jerusalem in 1894. (The book deals with various topics, including "the section about the Biblical Codex" (שער כתר תורה), about the famous Aleppo Codex. It is this section which has made Boyarski known to history, for the Codex was still undamaged in his day, whereas much of it was lost in 1948.)

== Family ==
Boyarski came from a distinguished rabbinical family; his grandfather's brother, Shemuel [ben] Avigdor, was a rabbinical judge in Vilna at the time of the R. Elijah, the Gaon of Vilna (mid-18th century). His brother, Israel Hayyim (died 1888), was the gabbai of the Jewish community of Brisk (i.e., immigrants from Brisk) in Palestine, and the founder of the Grodno kollel in Palestine.

== Life ==
=== In Europe ===
Boyarski was born in the city of Hrodna, around 1820. From early on, young Shemuel Shelomo was considered quite a prodigy, so Zev Wolf, rabbi of Bialistok (author of a number of works on halakha, such as Aggudath Ezov and Mar’oth Ha-tzov’oth) gave Boyarski his daughter in marriage, and gave him space to study in his house. However, R. Zev Wolf died after a few years, and Boyarski went on to study with Rabbi Eliezer Landau (author of Dammeseq Eli‘ezer), in Hrodna.

After two years studying with Rabbi Landau, Boyarski lost his wife. He was left with their two children, Zev Wolf and Avigdor. He remarried, to a woman named Rachel Leah, daughter of R. Baruch of Kovno, but had no children with her. Rachel Leah financially supported Shemuel Shelomo and his two children, so that he would not have to take any job, even a rabbinical position. She financed the writing of scrolls of the entire Hebrew Bible: Torah, Nevi'im, and Kethuvim. Although Torah scrolls are quite common, it is much less common to find scrolls of the Nevi'im, and extremely uncommon to find scrolls of the Kethuvim.

=== In the Ottoman Empire ===
Relocation to Jerusalem

In 1857, Boyarski and his family moved from Lithuania to Jerusalem, which was then under Ottoman rule. This move was part of a broader trend of Jewish migration to the Holy Land during the 19th century, often driven by religious fervour and a desire to be closer to sacred sites.

Religious and Scholarly Contributions

While in Jerusalem, Boyarski did not take any rabbinical position or profession, but spent his time studying religious texts and was supported by his brother, Israel Hayyim, who was living in the Holy Land at this point. One of his significant contributions was the "Ammudei Shesh," a comprehensive work that explored various aspects of Jewish law and tradition. His scholarship was well-regarded within the Jewish community, and he was seen as an authority on Halakhic (Jewish legal) matters.

Community Impact

Boyarski's presence in Jerusalem contributed to the spiritual and intellectual life of the Jewish community there. He was part of a network of rabbis and scholars who helped maintain and strengthen Jewish religious practices and education in the city.

Challenges and Resilience

Life in Jerusalem during the Ottoman period was not without its challenges. The city faced political instability, economic hardships, and social tensions. Despite these difficulties, Boyarski's commitment to his faith and scholarship remained steadfast, and he remained a prominent figure in the community. It was in Jerusalem that Boyarski wrote his published works.

== Works ==
Boyarski's main work, Ammudei Shesh (1894), says on its title page: "On the topic of the sacrifices and service performed in the Temple" (על ענייני הקרבנות ועבודת בית המקדש). However, this describes the content only of Part I of the book. Part II deals with various other topics, including the Aleppo Codex.

In addition to Ammudei Shesh, Boyarski published also a small book called Dim‘ath Ha-‘ashuqim (The Tears of the Oppressed, an allusion to Ecclesiastes 4:1), in 1864. In the 1870s, he wrote articles on religious subjects for the Hebrew journals Havatzeleth and Sha‘aré Tziyyon, but he eventually stopped writing for them, because he felt that it was inappropriate to write articles about Torah in periodical journals, which were liable to be thrown out after being read. (Throwing away the articles would be disrespectful to their religious content.).

== Idiosyncratic attitude toward biblical scrolls ==
=== Scrolls of Nakh (Nevi'im and Kethuvim) ===
Boyarski had a unique attitude towards the written form of Scripture. It has been typical among Jewish communities for the past millennium to use codexes of Scripture in most situations; since the invention of printing, these have typically been printed codexes. The traditional handwritten scrolls have been retained only for the Torah and the Book of Esther, and even for these books, the scrolls are used only in official liturgical readings. In the eighteenth century, Rabbi Elijah, the Gaon of Vilna, had instituted for haftaroth to be read from handwritten scrolls of the books of Nevi'im, and had ordered a set of full scrolls of all books of Scripture, including even the Kethuvim. Nonetheless, there is no evidence that the Gaon avoided using codices for personal study. In the century following the innovation of the Vilna Gaon, it became moderately common in many communities to write Nevi'im on scrolls, because the books of the Nevi'im are used for liturgical reading of the haftara. On the other hand, it was exceedingly uncommon to write books of the Kethuvim on scrolls.

Boyarski wrote:

As I have written, the printed books, including those of Scripture, will lose all their sanctity [in Messianic times], and the old prohibition will be restored -- that is, it will be prohibited to read or study Scripture from any item other than a scroll written on parchment, in accordance with the halakha. And when the Resurrection of the Dead takes place, the old Biblical figures will return: Moses, who wrote the Book of Job; King David, who wrote the Book of Psalms; King Solomon, who wrote the Book of Proverbs; and Ezra and the men of the Keneseth Ha-gedola. These individuals all went through such effort to write their books on parchment, in accordance with halakha, with features such as Qeré and Kethiv, and Open and Closed Paragraphs, in accordance with intentions which they had; they did so not only for their own amusement, but as a legacy for all generations. When they return, they will ask: "Where is my book?" They will not be happy with the printed copies—and (if we do not start producing kosher scrolls of the books), there will not be a single proper copy in the whole Jewish people. Will we not be greatly ashamed then?

Boyarski himself wrote a full set of kosher scrolls of all the books of Nevi'im and Kethuvim (in addition to the Torah). Moreover, he also wrote an additional copy of the Book of Psalms, which he sent to a brother of his, who lived in Brisk. Boyarski intended that reading from these scrolls should be preceded by a special berakha, ברוך אתה ה' אלהינו מלך העולם אשר קדשנו במצוותיו וצוונו לקרות בכתובים, "Blessed art Thou, O Lord our God, King of the universe, who has sanctified us with His commandments, and commanded us to read from the Scriptures." Although this berakha appears in the early medieval text Tractate Sofrim, it is not part of normative Jewish practice. Modern Judaism has tended to be extremely wary of reciting berakhoth which are not standard, so deciding to recite this berakha was quite unconventional on Boyarski's part.

Boyarski mentions explicitly messianic associations of his project of restoring the ancient form of writing Scripture, as we see when he mentions the resurrection of Biblical figures. This seems to be part of a general trend among Jews in nineteenth-century Palestine and elsewhere, who were restoring ancient practices—most obviously, the "practice" of living in Eretz Yisrael, but also (later on in the nineteenth century, in Eastern Europe) practices such as wearing tekheleth in their tzitzith. Zvi Hirsch Kalischer even wanted to restore the ancient sacrificial cult. (The fact that Boyarski wrote a book on the sacrifices—part I of Ammudei Shesh—might be evidence that he, too, was interested in this project.)

=== Private use of Torah scrolls, by individuals at home ===
Boyarski ruled that when an individual reads from a kosher Torah scroll, even totally alone, a berakha must be recited beforehand, just as in a public reading. Traditional halakha assumes that if one recites a berakha over Torah-study once a day, early in the morning, one need not recite another berakha for any further private Torah-study in which one engages over the rest of the day. Boyarski rules that this does not apply to an act of study in which one uses a kosher Torah scroll; rather, in such a case, one must recite a separate berakha each time one begins a new act of study. Moreover, he cites a story in the Talmud according to which the Temple was destroyed because the Jews of the time did not recite a berakha before studying Torah. Boyarski says that this story refers specifically to the case of private reading from Torah scrolls; he says that the Jews at the time of the Temple relied on the berakha which they had recited earlier in the morning, but they should have recited a berakha again before each time they opened up their Torah scrolls to read from them. Because they did this incorrectly, they were punished with the destruction of the Temple (!).

== Importance to Twentieth-Century scholars studying the Aleppo Codex ==
In order to produce kosher scrolls, Boyarski needed to have an accurate copy of the letter-text of Scripture, and of the paragraph breaks, and of the proper poetic layout of the books of Psalms, Proverbs, and Job. For this purpose, he became somehow involved in the project of Moses Joshua Kimchi, the son-in-law of R. Shalom Shachne Yellin of Skydel; Kimchi went on an expedition to Aleppo, to examine the highly reputed Aleppo Codex. Kimchi spent some time carefully studying the codex there, and he jotted down his findings in the margins of a printed Hebrew Bible belonging to his father-in-law.

In 1948, during Syrian riots in Aleppo, the Aleppo Codex was damaged, and scholars believed that it had been destroyed. In 1957, it was discovered that much of the codex had survived, and had been smuggled into Jerusalem. However, scholars were interested in reconstructing the missing portions of the codex, and looked for secondary sources which could help them in this endeavor.

Although scholars could not locate the Bible belonging to Yellin and Kimchi, they knew of its existence, from Boyarski's references to it in ‘Ammudei Shesh. This was all that was known about this Bible until 1989, when Yosef Ofer discovered the actual item.
