= Jeshua Shababo =

Egyptian scribe and rabbi

Jeshua Shababo (Hebrew: ישועה בן אברהם שבבו זיין) was an Egyptian scribe and rabbi, who lived in the last quarter of the seventeenth century. His teachers were Rabbis Abraham ha-Levi of Cairo and Joseph Nazir, who afterward became his father-in-law. The former included some dissertations of his pupil in his work Ginnat Veradim. The two men differed in opinion, and the pupil answered his teacher in Peraḥ Shushan (Constantinople, 1732). Besides, he wrote Sha'are Orah, Sha'are Torah, and a large work in two parts entitled Sha'are Yeshu'ah, containing responsa. Shababo was for some time a sofer, but resigned this office from religious motives when he was appointed dayyan of Cairo.
