= Aviel Barclay =

Canadian female sofer

- Born: Alison Barclay; 1968 (age 57–58); Prince George, British Columbia, Canada
- Occupation: Jewish scribe
- Known for: First traditionally trained and certified female sofer
- Spouse: Joel Rothschild
- Website: soferet.com

Aviel Barclay (born 1969) is a Canadian soferet (Jewish scribe). On October 6, 2003, she became the first woman to be traditionally trained and certified as a Jewish scribe, an occupation held by men in the Orthodox tradition. She completed her first Torah scroll in fall 2010 under the auspices of the Kadima Women's Torah Project in Seattle, Washington. She is the subject of the 2005 television documentary Soferet.

Born to a Christian family in Prince George, British Columbia, Barclay converted to Judaism as an adult.

== Early life ==
She was born Alison Barclay in Prince George, British Columbia, Canada, to a Christian family. As a girl, she enjoyed calligraphy and taught herself the letters of the Hebrew alphabet by the age of 10. In 1991, at age 22, she injured her right hand in a cycling accident and underwent intensive therapy and rehabilitation to regain its use.

== Career ==
Barclay converted to Judaism as an adult and joined the Orthodox Jewish community. She also desired to become a sofer (Jewish scribe), a field that is traditionally restricted to men. While she was using her calligraphy skills to write Jewish marriage contracts (ketubot), she spent many months trying to find a scribe willing to teach her the ancient art and its many laws. Finally, a Jerusalem scribe, who has not been named, contacted her through her website and offered to help her improve her calligraphy skills. Eventually he agreed to teach her the techniques and laws as well. Barclay's training, which took years, was conducted first through correspondence classes and then in a Jerusalem yeshiva.

On October 6, 2003, Barclay became the first woman to be traditionally trained and certified as a Jewish scribe. In early 2005 she was commissioned to write a mezuzah for a new synagogue in Jamaica Plain, Boston. That same year, she was commissioned to write her first Torah scroll by Kadima's Women's Torah Project in Seattle, Washington. She completed the writing of the scroll in fall 2010; it is being used by the Kadima Reconstructionist congregation. Barclay's Torah scroll was adorned with two crowns, a mantle, a breastplate, and attached to wooden poles fashioned by other female artists. The total cost for writing and decorating the scroll was $60,000.

The validity of Barclay's accomplishment in Jewish law (halakha) is subject to debate. According to the Talmud (Gittin 45b), a Torah scroll written by a woman for ritual use is invalid. However, several modern-day rabbis have presented arguments supporting the view that a woman can write a scroll for ritual use. Barclay herself does not view her act as a feminist or political statement, but as an "act of faith".

== Television documentary ==
Barclay's "personal spiritual journey" that led her to Judaism and to writing a Torah scroll is the subject of the 48-minute television documentary Soferet: A Special Scribe. The 2005 film was written, produced and directed by Donna and Daniel Zuckerbrot and aired on VisionTV.

== Personal life ==
Barclay and her husband, Joel Rothschild, reside in Vancouver, British Columbia, Canada.

== See also ==
- Jen Taylor Friedman, first woman to complete the writing of a Torah scroll
