= Congregation Dorshei Emet =

Reconstructionist synagogue in Hampstead, Quebec

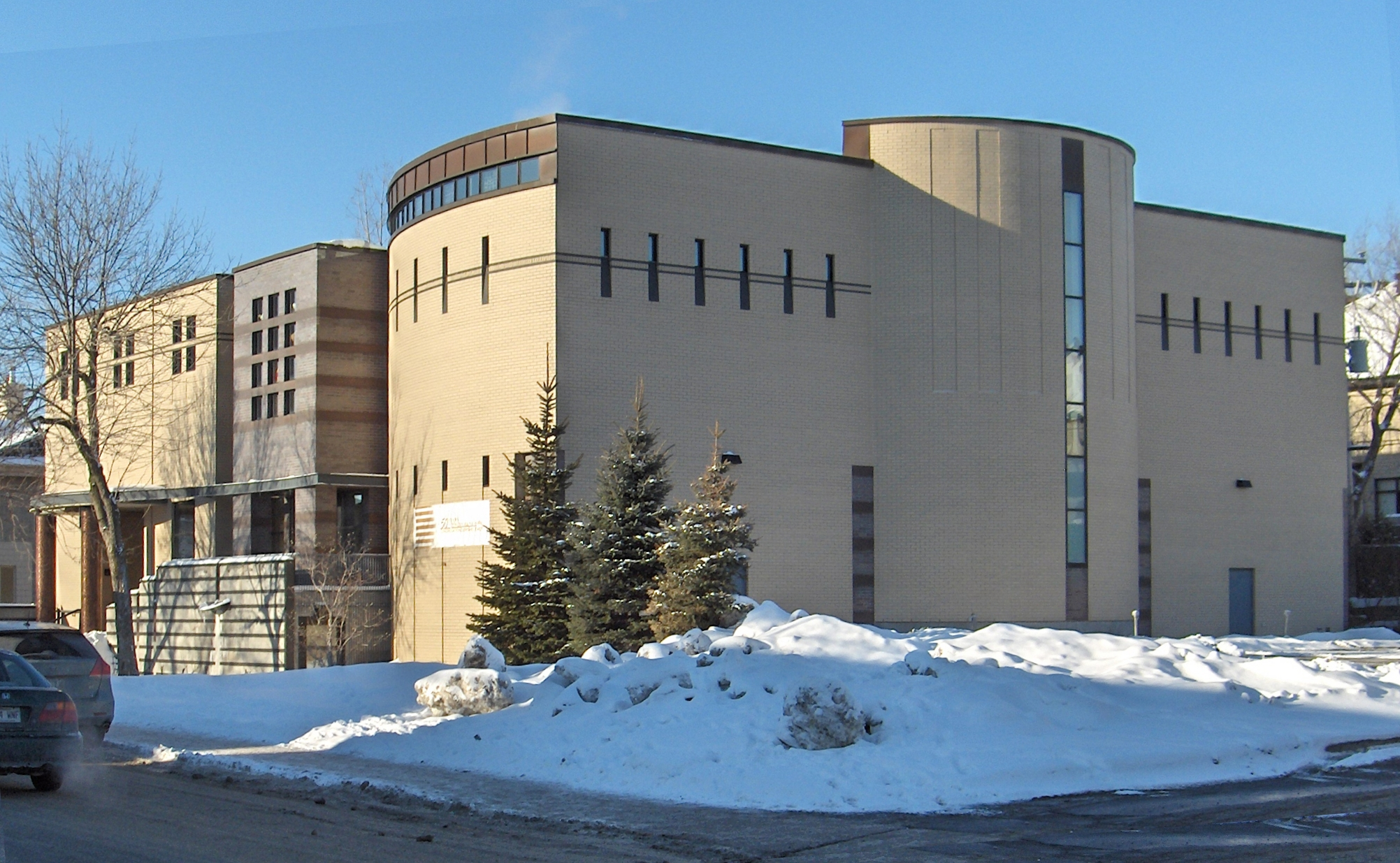
- Sanctuary exterior

Religion
- Affiliation: Reconstructionist Judaism
- Leadership: Rabbi: Boris Dolin
- Status: Active

Location
- Location: 18 Cleve Road, Hampstead, Quebec, Canada
- Interactive map of Congregation Dorshei Emet
- Coordinates: 45.486655°N 73.652532°W

Architecture
- Architect: Roseanne Moss
- Completed: 2003
- Construction cost: $4.2 million
- Capacity: Sanctuary: 700; Reception hall:400

Website
- dorsheiemet.com

Congregation Dorshei Emet (Hebrew: בית הכנסת דרשי אמת or "Seekers of Truth Synagogue") is a Reconstructionist synagogue in Hampstead, Quebec. It was founded in 1960 by Lavy Becker, who served as volunteer rabbi. Ron Aigen was hired as the congregation's first paid rabbi in 1976. Rabbi Boris Dolin joined the shul in 2016. Dorshei Emet constructed its first synagogue building in 1967. The congregation soon outgrew this structure, and built a larger one on the same site in 2003.

Dorshei Emet is the only Reconstructionist synagogue in Quebec, and the oldest in Canada.

== Early history ==
The Reconstructionist movement's first congregation in Canada was founded in 1960 as the Reconstructionist Synagogue of Montreal by Rabbi Lavy Becker, in time for the High Holy Days. Born in 1905 in Montreal, Becker attended high school in Montreal, and studied Talmud at Yeshiva College (today Yeshiva University) in New York. He graduated from McGill University with a B.A. in 1926, and in 1930 was ordained at the Jewish Theological Seminary of America, where he was strongly influenced by Rabbi Mordecai Kaplan, the creator of Reconstructionist Judaism.

Becker was the driving force behind a number of synagogues; he had previously helped found the Orthodox Young Israel of Montreal (in 1921), and been the founding rabbi of the Conservative Congregation Beth-El in Mount Royal, Quebec (in 1951). He also helped organize Toronto's first Reconstructionist synagogue, Congregation Darchei Noam, in 1962, and Plantation, Florida's Ramat Shalom Reconstructionist congregation in 1975.

The Reconstructionist Synagogue of Montreal originally resembled a chavurah, and worshiped in a number of different locations. The synagogue's Torah scrolls came from Egypt, Morocco and Trinidad; Becker was instrumental in acquiring them.

== First building ==
In 1964, the congregation acquired land on Cleve Road in Hampstead, and began construction of its first building there. The "habitant-style" building was designed by Montreal architect Harold Ship and completed in 1967, and officially opened by Kaplan during a Reconstructionist convention in Montreal in the spring that year. The building was a one-story structure comprising a sanctuary, some offices, and a small kitchen, and did not have a basement. It featured stained glass windows by David Ascalon.

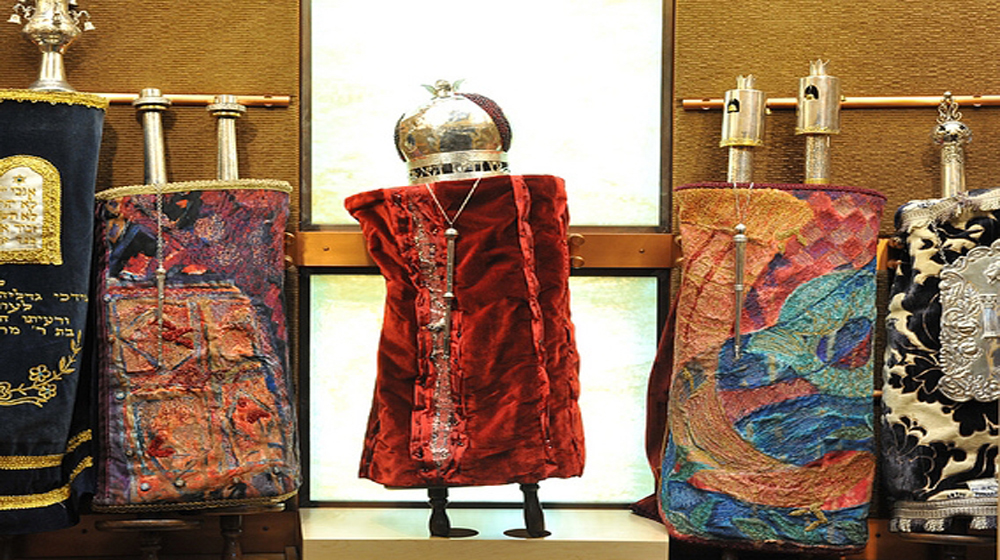
Torah scrolls from Egypt, Morocco and Trinidad

The congregation adopted the name Congregation Dorshei Emet in the late 1970s, though it was still also known as "the Reconstructionist Synagogue of Montreal". Ron Aigen was hired as the congregation's first paid rabbi in 1976. That year the congregation, which had under 180 member families, added an extension to its building.

Becker led the congregation as rabbi until 1976 or 1977. His role as rabbi at Dorshei Emet was unpaid, and while serving there he had also served in a number of other roles, including on the executive of the Canadian Jewish Congress and the World Jewish Congress, as president of the Jewish Reconstructionist Federation, and as chairman of the Board of Overseers of the Reconstructionist Rabbinical College.

Dorshei Emet began accepting non-Jewish partners of members as a gerei toshav in 1985. Its 1994 constitution, however, clarified that while a non-Jewish spouse of a member was considered a ger toshav, and "may be welcomed into the synagogue", he or she was not "entitled to membership in the congregation". In 1993, the congregation resolved that "gay and lesbian Jews, their Jewish partners and families" would be welcome "as full members of our congregation". With the hiring of Rabbi Boris Dolin, the congregation underwent a community discussion about whether the rabbi can officiate at interfaith marriages, and it was decided to make this change. Currently, Dorshei Emet is one of only two synagogues in the city of Montreal which allow interfaith marriages.

== Current building ==
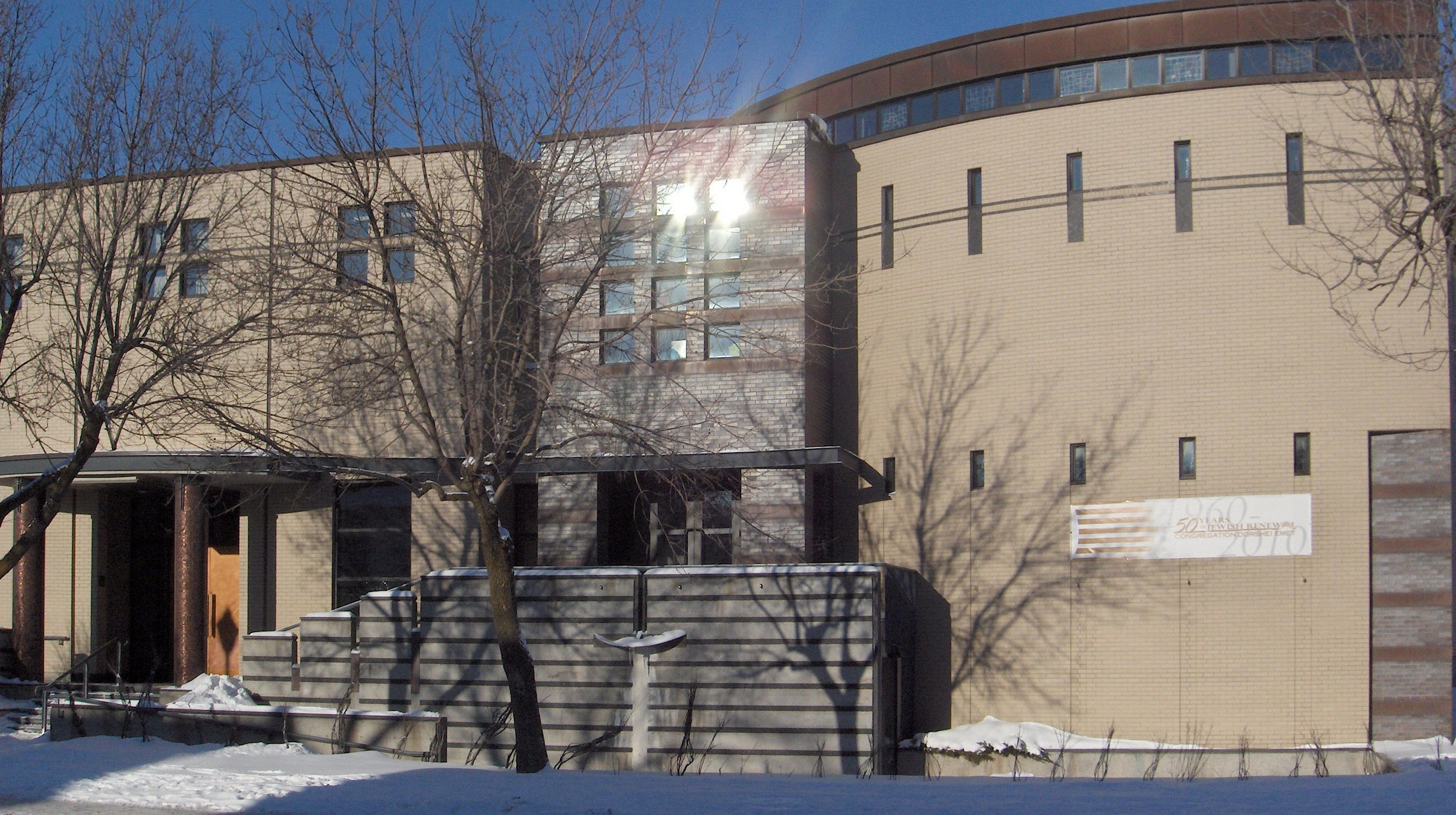
The building lacks exterior decoration.

By 1994, membership exceeded 410 households. The congregation's growth made it impossible for all members to worship together; the original synagogue building had been sized for no more than 150 families. On the High Holy Days, when around 600 people attended (versus 150 on a typical Shabbat), services were split between the sanctuary and a school auditorium/gymnasium. In 1992, the congregation voted against expanding the building, but after the 1995 Quebec sovereignty referendum, members felt more confident in Quebec's political situation and economy. In 1999, Aigen led the congregation in a campaign to construct a new building. The property next to the existing building was purchased to accommodate a larger structure, and the existing sanctuary was torn down. While the new synagogue was under construction, the congregation worshiped and held activities at the YM-YWHA. The new building was open in time for the 2003 High Holy Days.

=== Architecture ===
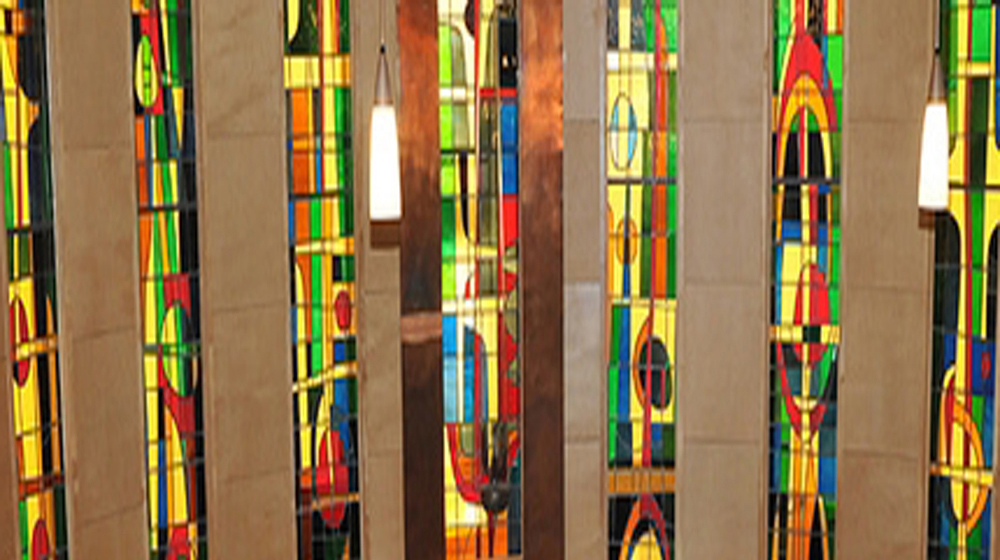
Stained glass windows in the sanctuary

The architect was Dorshei Emet member Roseanne Moss of the firm Fournier Gersovitz Moss et associés architectes. The new building's exterior was in the form of an unornamented rectangular solid. It was about twice the size of the old one, and had a social hall, library, larger kitchen, and more office space.

=== Interior ===
The stained glass windows from the old building were installed in the new sanctuary, which one entered through a copper door. Additional stained glass windows were created by Montreal's Studio du Verre in 2005.

The stained glass windows are heavily oriented towards abstract forms. Together with the Torah ark, they form the figure of a geometrical seven-branched candelabrum or menorah. The other sanctuary walls are pale beige and extremely simple in comparison. During the day, the interior is illuminated by natural light entering through the translucent walls overhead. At night, the entire building glows from interior artificial lighting.

Sound damping and acoustics for the sanctuary was done by MJM Conseillers en Acoustique/MJM Acoustical Consultants. In accordance with Reconstructionist Judaism's view of Judaism as an evolving civilization, Dorshei Emet supports Jewish culture and artistic achievement, and the sanctuary is used not only for worship, but also for Jewish cultural and musical events.

== Recent events ==
In May 2009, Dorshei Emet commissioned female scribe Jen Taylor Friedman to write a new Torah scroll, in honor of the congregation's 50th anniversary. Dorshei Emet is the first synagogue in Canada and the third in the world to receive a Torah handwritten by a woman; Friedman–then the only woman to have completed a Torah scroll–had previously written two others. The Torah was completed on May 16, 2010.

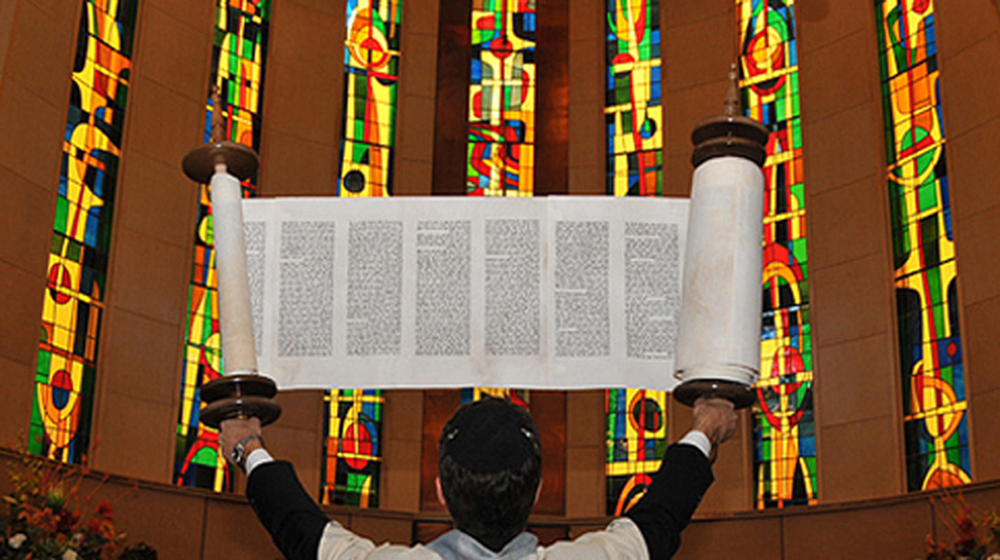
Torah scroll raised in the sanctuary

Since its founding, men and women have had identical roles at Dorshei Emet. According to Aigen, the synagogue "is an egalitarian, participatory community of Jews where women have always been equal players and full participants in Jewish ritual life, including reading from the Torah".

As of 2016, Dorshei Emet had close to 500 member households. It is one of only three Reconstructionist congregations in Canada (the others were in Toronto and Ottawa). Starting in 2015, the congregation began a visioning process to search for a new full-time rabbi to replace Rabbi Aigen after his retirement in 2016. In early 2016, Rabbi Boris Dolin, a Reconstructionist rabbi from Oregon, was chosen from among 27 candidates to be the next full-time rabbi. Before joining the Dorshei Emet community, Rabbi Dolin was the rabbi of Beit Polska, the Union of Progressive Congregations in Poland, and Beit Warszawa, a progressive congregation in Warsaw.

Only a few weeks before his planned retirement, Rabbi Aigen died of a massive stroke, which came as a shock to the community just as they were preparing to celebrate his 40 years of serving the community.

The rabbi of Congregation Dorshei Emet is Boris Dolin.

== Emet Gallery ==
Based at Dorshei Emet Synagogue, the Emet Gallery present exhibitions of photography and multimedia art presented "through the Jewish lens". Exhibitions have included:

- Kol Ishah/ In Her Voice / Elle prend la parole (March–December 2009): Video and photographic works by three artists: Lucy Levene (UK), Devora Neumark (Montreal) and Melissa Shiff (Toronto).
- One History, Many Stories: A Family Album of Israel at 60 (September 2008–January 2009): The faces of contemporary Israeli society by photographer Zion Ozeri.
- The Living Land: Photographs by Yaal Herman (May–October 2008): Individuals juxtaposed against the Israeli landscape.
- Makom: Seeking Sacred Space (December 2007–March 2008): A popular exhibit on sacred spaces, featuring David Kaufman's series on the former and current synagogues of Le Plateau-Mont-Royal and David Cowles' images of Jewish sites in North Africa.
- Shout in the Ears of Jerusalem (September–December 2007): Benny Ferdman's photographs of discarded elements in an undistinguished field on the outskirts Los Angeles.
- Numi, Numi: Collecting Cradle Songs, Connecting Cultures / Recueillir des berceuses, connecter des cultures (April–May 2007): A video-collage by Israeli video-artist Shuli Nachshon.

Since September 2008, the Emet Gallery has also been running "The Hemshekh Project", which gathers oral histories and images from community members in order to create oral traditions for future generations.
