= Ethics in the Bible =

Ethics in the Bible refers to the systems or theories produced by the study, interpretation, and evaluation of biblical morals (including the moral code, standards, principles, behaviors, conscience, values, rules of conduct, or beliefs concerned with good and evil and right and wrong), that are found in the Hebrew and Christian Bibles. It comprises a narrow part of the larger fields of Jewish and Christian ethics, which are themselves parts of the larger field of philosophical ethics. Ethics in the Bible is different compared to other Western ethical theories in that it is seldom overtly philosophical. It presents neither a systematic nor a formal deductive ethical argument. Instead, the Bible provides patterns of moral reasoning that focus on conduct and character in what is sometimes referred to as virtue ethics. This moral reasoning is part of a broad, normative covenantal tradition where duty and virtue are inextricably tied together in a mutually reinforcing manner.

Some critics have viewed certain biblical teachings to be morally problematic and accused it of advocating for slavery, genocide, supersessionism, the death penalty, violence, patriarchy, sexual intolerance and colonialism. The problem of evil, an argument that is used to argue against the existence of the Judeo-Christian-Islamic God, is an example of criticism of ethics in the Bible.

Conversely, it has been seen as a cornerstone of both Western culture, and many other cultures across the globe. Concepts such as justice for the widow, orphan and stranger provided inspiration for movements ranging from abolitionism in the 18th and 19th century, to the civil rights movement, the Anti-Apartheid Movement, and liberation theology in Latin America.

== Overview ==
=== The Bible ===
According to traditional Jewish enumeration, the Hebrew Bible is composed of 24 books which came into being over a span of almost a millennium. The Bible's earliest texts reflect a Late Bronze Age civilization of the Ancient Near East, while its last text, usually thought to be the Book of Daniel, comes from a second century BCE Hellenistic period. This historical development has to be taken into consideration in any account of ethics in the Bible. Ethicist Eryl W. Davies writes that many scholars question whether the biblical account can be regarded as an accurate account of "how it really happened." The Bible has an "air of appearing to know things we are actually very unsure about, and it has tended to state as fact what was merely speculation... There is a growing recognition it reflects the ethical values and norms of the educated class in ancient Israel, and that very little can be known about the moral beliefs of the 'ordinary' Israelites." As a result, many scholars believe the Bible is unsuitable for "doing philosophy." Philosopher Jaco Gericke quotes philosopher Robert P. Carroll saying the Bible is "too untidy, too sprawling, and too boisterous to be tamed by neat systems of thought."

At the same time, ethicist John Barton says most scholars recognize the Bible is "more than just a jumble of isolated precepts with no underlying rationale." The biblical narratives, laws, wisdom sayings, parables, and unique genrés of the Bible are the sources of its ethical concepts. However, Barton also says there are problematic texts and the author's intent is not always easy to decipher. Much of biblical narrative refrains from direct comment, and there are problems in turning to the narratives for ethical insight. "First... the narratives are often far from morally edifying... Second, though Old Testament stories are about what we might call 'moral issues', it is often not easy to decide what is being commended and what deplored. Third there is a general problem about describing the moral world of biblical narrative... are we talking about the real world...or the imagined world?" Barton concludes, the Bible's moral "philosophy is more complicated than it might appear."

Jewish philosophers Shalom Carmy and David Schatz explain one of many difficulties doing philosophy in the Bible is that philosophers dislike contradicting themselves whereas the Bible, by contrast, "often juxtaposes contradictory ideas, without explanation or apology". Gericke says using a descriptive, rather than an analytical philosophical approach, means the pluralism of the Bible need not be a problem. Descriptive philosophy is aimed purely at clarifying meaning and therefore, it has no difficulty "simply stating the nature of the diachronic variation and synchronic variability found in the biblical texts." Carmy and Schatz say the Bible does philosophical activity when it "depicts the character of God, presents an account of creation, posits a metaphysics of divine providence and divine intervention, suggests a basis for morality, discusses many features of human nature, and frequently poses the notorious conundrum of how God can allow evil."

=== Ethics ===
Philosopher Alan Mittleman says ethics in the Bible is not like western ethical theories in that it is seldom overtly "philosophical." It presents neither a systematic nor a deductive formal ethical argument, nor does it address traditional Western philosophical questions and arguments. The absence of Western approaches is not evidence there is an absence of ethics in the Bible however. Textual scholar Jaco Gericke writes, "The tendency to deny the Hebrew Bible anything philosophical when its rhetoric does not conform to Western varieties of philosophical systems actually involves a colonialist ethnocentric hermeneutical fallacy."

While there is no Western-style ethical system in the Bible, there are folk philosophical presuppositions in it; "in other words, the biblical texts contain metaphysical, epistemological, and ethical assumptions about the nature of reality, existence, life, knowledge, truth, belief, good and evil, value and so on" of the ancient folk who recorded it. Considering ethics in the Bible, therefore, means not using philosophical terms such as "deontological", "casuistic", "apodictic", and "theodicy", while still recognizing that, if a piece of literature contains ethical assumptions, it contains metaphysical and epistemological assumptions as well. It is "impossible to understand the Bible's fundamental structures of meaning without attending to the text's basic assumptions regarding reality, knowledge and value." These assumptions fall into the four basic philosophical categories.

==== Philosophical core ====
===== Metaphysics =====
First, Gericke says, metaphysics is found anywhere the Bible has something to say about "the nature of existence, reality, being, substance, mereology, time and space, causality, identity and change, objecthood and relations (e.g. subject and object), essence and accident, properties and functions, necessity and possibility (modality), order, mind and matter, freewill and determinism, and so on." Rolf Knierim says the Bible's metaphysic is "dynamistic ontology" which says reality is a dynamic process.

Ancient texts do not use ontological language of "being." Instead, philosopher Mark Smith explains that in the Bible, a fundamental ontology is embodied in language about power where the world and its beings derive their reality (their being, their power to exist, and to act), from the power of God (Being itself). The messenger divinities, the angels, derive their power from the One God, as do human kings. In metaphysical language, the power of lesser beings participates in Power itself, identified as God.

===== Epistemology =====
Secondly, there is epistemology in the Hebrew Bible. The Hebrew Bible contains assumptions about the nature of knowledge, belief, truth, interpretation, understanding and cognitive processes. Pluralism is the norm, so that no unified epistemology can be reconstructed, however, an ethnoepistemology can be found. Ethnoepistemology examines the "entire gamut of human epistemological practices from ordinary folk to diviners, shamans, priests", and the authors themselves.

Ethicist Michael V. Fox has written that the primary axiom in Proverbs says "the exercise of the human mind is the necessary and sufficient condition of right and successful behavior in all reaches of life: practical, ethical and religious" revealing a "folk presupposition" of epistemology: that virtue is knowledge, and knowledge is virtue.

===== Ethical assumptions =====
Third there is ethics, and the Bible's meta-ethical assumptions: "the meaning of good and evil, the nature of right and wrong, criteria for moral discernment, valid sources of morality, the origin and acquisition of moral beliefs, the ontological status of moral norms, moral authority, cultural pluralism, axiological and aesthetic assumptions about the nature of value and beauty. These are all implicit in the texts."

Fox writes that ancient Hebrew wisdom literature dwells on wisdom in a manner that separates it from wisdom literature of other ancient Near Eastern cultures. "This focus is closely bound to its ethics."

Mittleman explains that ethics in the Bible are provided by patterns of moral reasoning that focus on conduct and character. This moral reasoning is part of a broad normative covenantal tradition where duty and virtue are inextricably tied together in a mutually reinforcing manner.

Sociologist Stephen Mott says ethics in the Bible is a corporate, community based ethic. It is not simply individual.

===== Logic =====
Fourth there is logic. The Bible's discourse contains assumptions about what constitutes valid arguments, the nature of language and its relation to reality. The philosophy of the Bible is a religious philosophy, and that is implicit in its texts on "the nature of reasoning in religious thought, the warranting of beliefs, the justification of religious experience, strategies in polemical arguments, the nature of rational thinking, and the logic of belief revision."

== Ethical paradigms ==
Ethicist John Barton says there are three basic models, patterns or paradigms that form the basis of all ethics in the Bible: (1) obedience to God's will; (2) natural law; and (3) the imitation of God. Barton goes on to say the first is probably the strongest model. Obedience as a basis for ethics is found in Law and in the wisdom literature and in the Prophets. Eryl Davies says it is easy to overemphasize obedience as a paradigm since there is also a strong goal–oriented character to the moral teaching in the Bible. Asking where a course of action would lead was normal for the culture portrayed in biblical texts, and even laws have "motive clauses" oriented toward the future prosperity of the person being asked to obey.

"Natural law" as Barton uses it is "a vague phrase meant to be suggestive rather than defining." Eryl Davies says it is a term that should be used with some reservation since this is not the highly developed "natural law" found in Western thought. Nevertheless, the loosely defined paradigm is suggested by the ordering of the book of Genesis, where the creation story and the natural order were made a focal point as the book was assembled and edited. Natural law is in the Wisdom literature, the Prophets, Romans 1, and Acts 17. Natural law can be found in the book of Amos, where nations other than Israel are held accountable for their ethical decisions (Amos 1:3–2:5) even though they don't know the Hebrew god.

Davies says the clearest expression of the imitation of God as a basis for ethics is in Leviticus 19:2 where Yahweh instructs Moses to tell the people to be holy because Yahweh is holy. This idea is also in Leviticus 11:44; 20:7,26; 21:8. The prophets also asserted that God had moral qualities the Israelites should emulate. The Psalmists also frequently reflect on God's character forming the basis of the ethical life of those who worship Yahweh. Psalm 111, and 112 set out the attributes of God that must be reflected in the life of a 'true follower'. The ethic has limits; Barton points out that in 1 Samuel 26:19 David argues that if his own persecution is ordered by God that is one thing, but if it is the work of people, those people should be cursed.

== Applied ethics ==
=== Political ethics ===
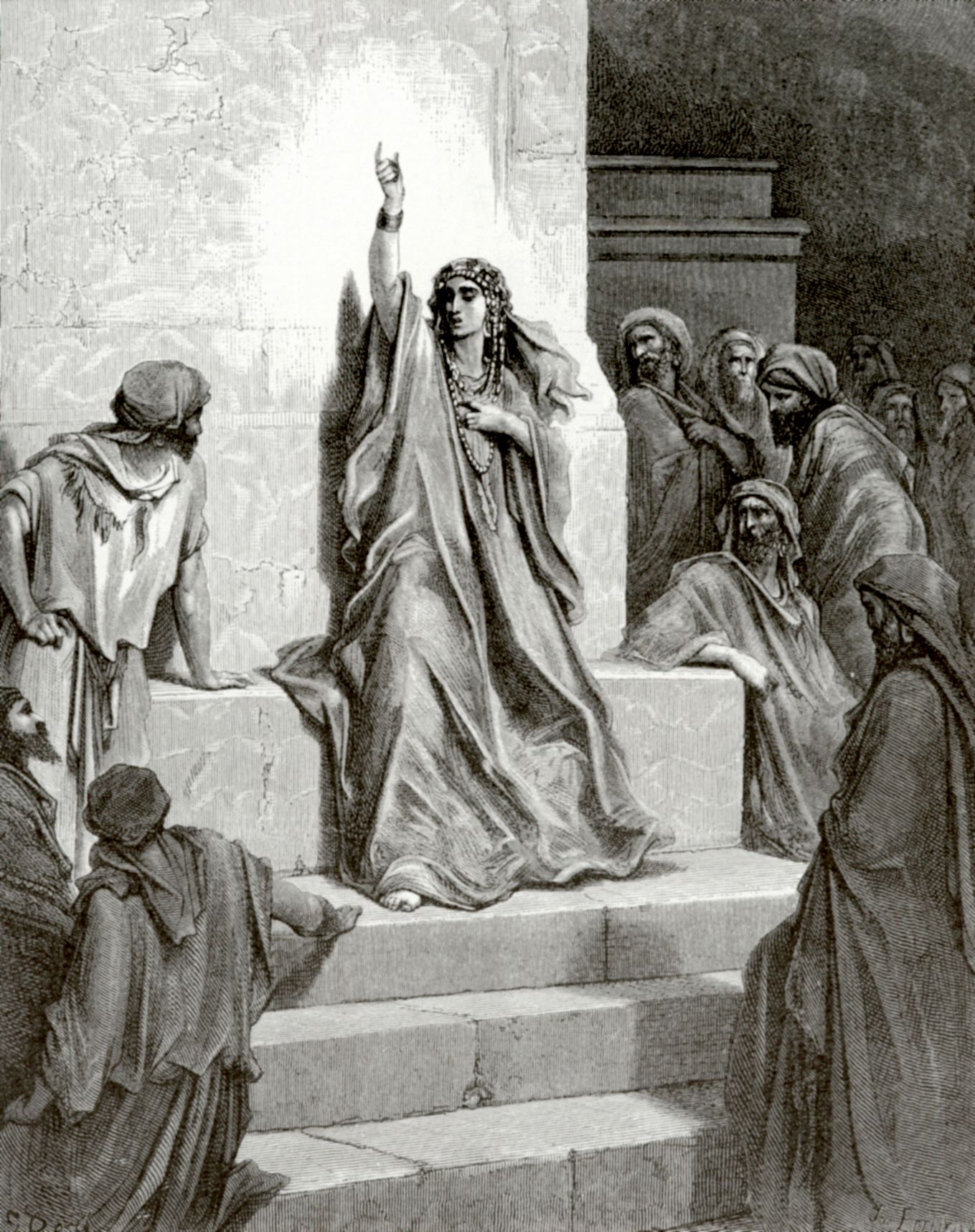
The Judge Deborah

Political theorist Michael Walzer (2012) stated: "The Bible is, above all, a religious book, but it is also a political book." There is no real political theory, as such, in the Bible, however, based on "legal codes, rules for war and peace, ideas about justice and obligation, social criticism, visions of the good society, and accounts of exile and dispossession" the Bible does contain folk presuppositions of comparative political views.

First, the Hebrew Bible (the Old Testament) advocates monarchy in Jerusalem, and also supports notions of theocracy; the speech of Abijah of Judah in Chronicles 2 13:4–12 is taken as one of the purest expressions of this idea; Yahweh ordained only David and his progeny to rule in Jerusalem and only Aaron and his progeny to serve in the Temple, and any other claims to political or religious power or authority are against the will of God. The Deuteronomist redaction of the Hebrew Bible especially emphasizes these ideas about the unity of politics and religion in a political state.

Biblical descriptions of divinely ordained monarchy directly underlie the understanding of Jesus as the "son of David" and the messiah (the anointed king) who at some point will govern the world.

Walzer says politics in the Bible is also similar to modern "consent theory" which requires agreement between the governed and the authority based on full knowledge and the possibility of refusal. Politics in the Bible also models "social contract theory" which says a person's moral obligations to form the society in which they live are dependent on that agreement. This implies a moral respect for God and his laws which is not a result of law, but pre-exists law. Walzer asserts this is what makes it possible for someone like Amos, "an herdsman and gatherer of sycamore fruit", to confront priests and kings, and remind them of their obligations. Moral law is, therefore, politically democratized in the Bible.

Walzer finds political ethics expressed in the Hebrew Bible in covenant, law, and prophecy, and he says they constitute an early form of almost democratic political ethics. First, God's covenant requires that everyone adhere equally to the agreement they made, as in later "general will" theories of democracy. "In the biblical texts, poor people, women, and even strangers, are recognized as moral agents in their own right whatever the extent of that agency might be." Second, Walker finds the idea that everyone was subject to God's law—that kings were not involved in making or interpreting the law, but were as subject to it, in principle, as every other Israelite. Third, Walzer finds in the Bible, prophets speak as the interpreters of divine law in public places to ordinary people. They came from every social strata and denounced the most powerful men in society—and everyone else too. Walzer wrote: "Their public and uninhibited criticism is an important signifier of religious democracy."

Political science scholar Amy E. Black says Jesus' command to pay taxes (Matthew 22:21), was not simply an endorsement of government, but was also a refusal to participate in the fierce political debate of his day over the Poll tax. Black quotes Old Testament scholar Gordon Wenham as saying, Jesus' response "implied loyalty to a pagan government was not incompatible with loyalty to God."

==== War and peace ====
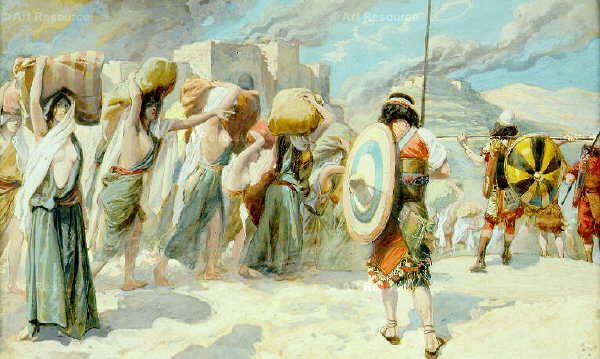
Midianite women, children and livestock taken captive by Israelite soldiers after all Midianite men had been killed and their towns burnt. Watercolour by James Tissot (c. 1900), illustrating the War against the Midianites in Numbers 31.

Warfare as a political act of nationhood, is a topic the Bible addresses ethically, both directly and indirectly, in four ways: there are verses that support pacifism, and verses that support non-resistance; 4th century theologian Augustine identified aspects of just war in the Bible, and preventive war which is sometimes called crusade has also been supported using Bible texts. Near Eastern scholar Susan Niditch says "To understand attitudes toward war in the Bible is thus to gain a handle on war in general".

Pacifism is not in the Hebrew Bible, but an ethic of peace can be found there. The term peace is mentioned 429 times in the Bible—and more than 2500 times in classical Jewish sources. Many of those refer to peace as a central part of God's purpose for mankind. Political activist David Cortright writes that shalom (peace in Hebrew) is a complex word with levels of meaning that embody the conditions and values necessary to prevent war: "social justice, self-determination, economic well-being, human rights, and the use of non-violent means to resolve conflict."

Most texts used to support pacifism are in the New Testament, such as Matthew 5:38–48 and Luke 6:27–36, but not all. Passages of peace from the Hebrew Bible, such as Micah 4:3: "They will beat their swords into plowshares and their spears into pruning hooks", are also often cited. According to theologian Myron S. Augsberger, pacifism opposes war for any reason. The ethic is founded in separation from the world and the world's ways of doing things, obeying God first rather than the state, and belief that God's kingdom is beyond this world. Bible scholar Herman A. Hoyt says Christians are obligated to follow Christ's example, which was an example of non-resistance. This obligation is to individual believers, not corporate bodies, or "unregenerate worldly governments."

Near Eastern scholar Yigal Levin, along with archaeologist Amnon Shapira, write that the ethic of war in the Bible is based on the concept of self-defense. Self-defense, or defense of others, is necessary for a war to be understood as a just war. Levin and Shapira say forbidding war for the purpose of expansion (Deuteronomy 2:2-6,9,17-19), the call to talk peace before war (Deuteronomy 20:10), the expectation of moral disobedience to a corrupt leader (Genesis 18:23-33; Exodus 1:17, 2:11-14, 32:32; 1 Samuel 22:17), as well as a series of verses governing treatment of prisoners (Deuteronomy 21:10–14; 2 Chronicles 28:10–15; Joshua 8:29, 10:26–27), respect for the land (Deuteronomy 20:19), and general "purity in the camp" (Deuteronomy 20:10–15) are aspects of the principles of just war in the Bible.

In Exodus, Deuteronomy, Joshua, and both books of Kings, warfare includes narratives describing a variety of conflicts with Amalekites, Canaanites, and Moabites. God commands the Israelites to conquer the Promised Land, placing city after city "under the ban", the herem of total war. This has been interpreted to mean every man, woman and child was to be killed. This leads many contemporary scholars to characterize herem as a command to commit genocide. Michael Walzer writes that herem was the common approach to war among the nations surrounding Israel of the bronze age, and Hebrew scholar Baruch A. Levine indicates Israel imported the concept from them. Walzer points out that verses 15 to 18 of Deuteronomy 20 are very old, suggesting "the addition of herem to an older siege law."

He goes on to say the earliest biblical sources show there are two ethics of conquest in the Bible with laws supporting each. Beginning at Deuteronomy 20:10–14 there is a limited war/(just war) doctrine consistent with Amos and First and Second Kings. From Deuteronomy 20 on, both war doctrines are joined without one superseding the other. However, starting in Joshua 9, after the conquest of Ai, Israel's battles are described as self-defense, and the priestly authors of Leviticus, and the Deuteronomists, are careful to give God moral reasons for his commandment. Scholars such as Paul Copan and Nicholas Wolterstorff have argued that the perceived order to commit genocide and descriptions of genocide were an example of "hagiographic hyperbole".

Holy war imagery is contained in the final book of the New Testament, Revelation, where John reconfigures traditional Jewish eschatology by substituting "faithful witness to the point of martyrdom for armed violence as the means of victory. Because the Lamb has won the decisive victory over evil by this means, his followers can participate in his victory only by following his path of suffering witness. Thus, Revelation repudiates apocalyptic militarism, but promotes the active participation of Christians in the divine conflict with evil".

==== Criminal justice ====
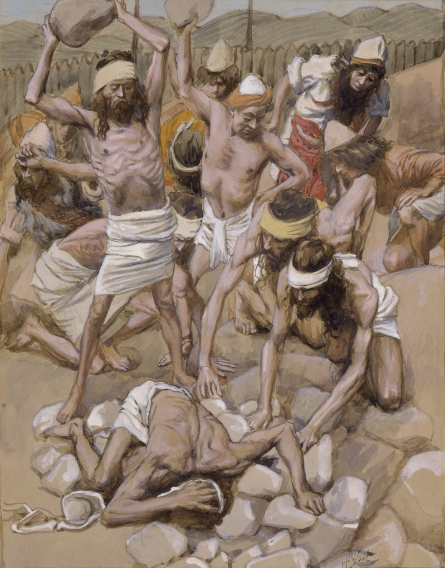
The Sabbath-breaker Stoned. Artistic impression of episode narrated in Numbers 15. James Tissot c.1900

Legal scholar Jonathan Burnside says biblical law is not fully codified, but it is possible to discern its key ethical elements. Key elements in biblical criminal justice begin with the belief in God as the source of justice and the judge of all, including those administering justice on earth. Criminal justice scholar Sam S. Souryal says the Bible emphasizes that ethical knowledge and moral character, of those within a justice system, are central to the administration of justice. He adds that foremost among the biblical ethical principles that ensure criminal justice are those prohibiting "lying and deception, racial prejudice and racial discrimination, egoism and the abuse of authority." In the Bible, human judges are thought capable of mediating even divine decisions if they have sufficient moral capacity and wisdom.

Biblical ethicist Christopher Marshall says there are about 20 offenses that carry the death penalty under Mosaic Law. Within the historical and ethical context of covenant, it was believed the covenant community suffered ritual pollution from certain sins, therefore capital punishment protected the community from the possible consequences of such pollution, as well as punished those who had broken covenant. "Evans explains that contemporary standards tend to view these laws of capital punishment as cavalier toward human life", however, within the framework of the ancient covenant, it suggests an ethic concerning the value of life was as much a communal value as an individual one.

Marshall goes on to say there are features of covenant law that have been adopted and adapted to contemporary human rights law: due process, fairness in criminal procedures, and equity in the application of the law. Within this ethic, judges are told not to accept bribes (Deuteronomy 16:19), were required to be impartial to native and stranger alike (Leviticus 24:22; Deuteronomy 27:19), to the needy and the powerful alike (Leviticus 19:15), and to rich and poor alike (Deuteronomy 1:16,17; Exodus 23:2–6). The right to a fair trial, and fair punishment, are also required (Deuteronomy 19:15; Exodus 21:23–25). Those most vulnerable in a patriarchal society—children, women, and strangers—were singled out for special protection (Psalm 72:2,4).

=== Relationships ===
==== In the Hebrew Bible ====
Almost all Near Eastern societies of the Bronze (3000–1200 BCE) and Axial Ages (800 to 300 BCE), including Israel and Judah, were patriarchal with patriarchy established in most by 3000 BCE. The patriarchal model of ancient Israel became an accepted aspect of biblical interpretation through anthropology of the nineteenth century. Feminist biblical scholars of second-wave feminism later appropriated it. In the early twenty first century there is substantial agreement among a wide variety of scholars that the Hebrew Bible is a predominantly patriarchal document from a patriarchal age. However, others assert there are also evidences of a kind of metaphysical "gender blindness" in the Hebrew Bible. Third wave feminists began raising concerns about the accuracy of a claim of overarching patriarchy for ancient Hebrew culture. Meyers concludes "male dominance was real, but it was fragmentary, not hegemonic".

Hebrew Bible scholar Tykva Frymer-Kensky says the role of women in the Bible is generally one that is subordinate to men, however, unlike other ancient literature, the Hebrew Bible does not explain or justify cultural subordination by portraying women as deserving of less because of their naturally evil or innately inferior natures. Discussions of the nature of women, such as those found in some Ancient and Classical Greek and Roman writings which describe women as an innately inferior race separate from the race of men, are conspicuously absent from the Hebrew Bible. The biblical depiction of early Bronze Age culture up through the Axial Age, depicts the "essence" (that is the Bible's metaphysical view of being and nature) of both male and female as "created in the image of God" with neither inherently inferior in nature. Old Testament scholar Jerome Creach says the placement of the Genesis (1:1–2:4a) story at the beginning of the entire Bible shows it was normative for those who gave the Hebrew Bible canon its present shape.

Laws concerning the loss of female virginity have no male equivalent. These and other gender differences found in the Torah suggest that, within those texts, women are subordinate to men. Adultery was defined differently for men than for women: a woman was an adulteress if she had sexual relations outside her marriage, but if a man had sexual relations outside his marriage with an unmarried woman, a concubine or a prostitute, it was not considered adultery on his part. Non-conforming sex – homosexuality, bestiality, cross dressing and masturbation – are described as being punishable. Stringent protection of the marital bond and loyalty to kin is portrayed as very strong.

The zonah of the Hebrew Bible is a woman who is not under the authority of a man; she may be a paid prostitute, but not necessarily. In the Bible, for a woman or girl who was under the protection of a man to be called a "zonah" was a grave insult to her and her family. The zonah is shown as lacking protection, making each zonah vulnerable and available to other men; the lack of a specific man governing her meant that she was free to act in ways that other women weren't. According to David Blumenthal, the Bible depicts the zonah as "dangerous, fearsome and threatening by her freedom, and yet appealing and attractive at the same time." Her freedom is recognized by biblical law and her sexual activity is not punishable. She is the source of extra-institutional sex. Therefore she is seen as a threat to patriarchy and the family structure it supports. Over time, the term "zonah" came to applied to a married woman who committed adultery, and that sense of the term was used as a metaphor for people being unfaithful to Yahweh, especially in the Book of Hosea and the Book of Ezekiel; the descriptions of sexual acts and punishments of the metaphorical zonah in those books are brutal and pornographic.

The Hebrew Bible contains strict purity laws, both ritual and moral. Near Eastern scholar Eve Levavi Feinstein writes "The concepts of pollution and sexuality seem inextricably linked", yet the views in the Bible vary more than is generally recognized. Pollution terminology is used for illegal sexual contact such as rape and adultery, and it is also used for legal and licit sexual intercourse, menstruation, and for some perhaps unavoidable diseases. This makes the Bible's view of the relationship between temporary ritual pollution and more serious moral pollution "murky." Pollution concepts in the Hebrew Bible are connected to certain areas of experience such as sex, death, and certain kinds of illnesses and food. The Hebrew term for pollution appears 286 times and the term for purity appears 207 times. Feinstein says the Hebrew Bible never uses the term 'pure' (טָהֵר) to describe virginity, but does use it to describe a married woman who has not committed adultery (Numbers 5:28). Wanton, unrepentant sins are seen as having a contaminating effect on the sanctuary similar to environmental pollution.

==== In the New Testament ====
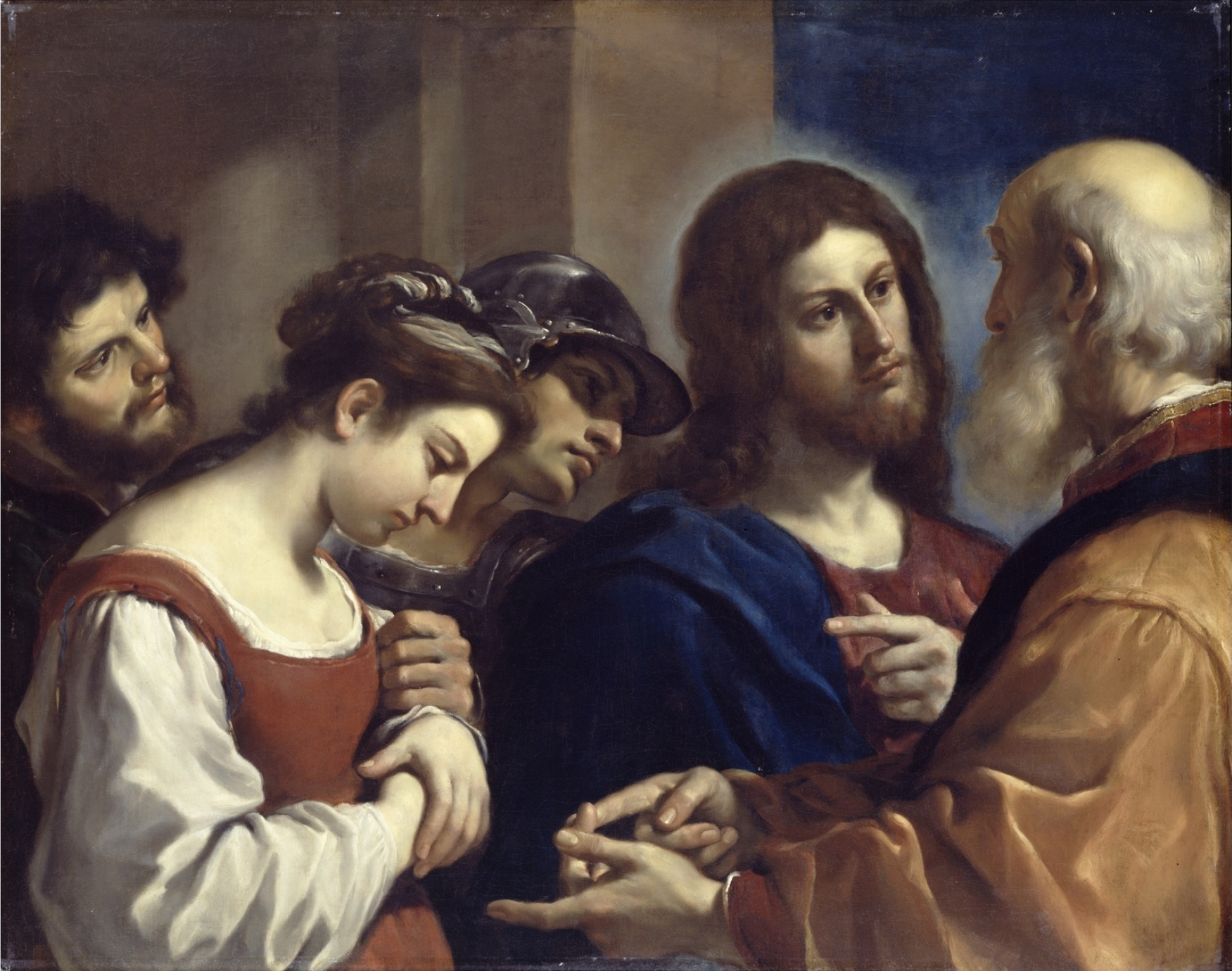
Christ with the Woman Taken in Adultery, by Guercino, 1621. Depicts Jesus and the woman taken in adultery

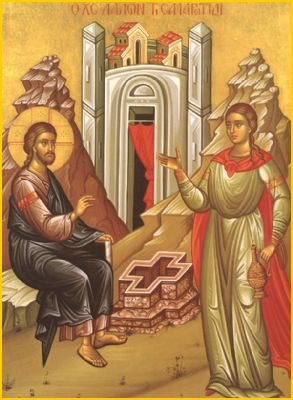
Orthodox icon of Photina, the Samaritan woman, meeting Jesus by the well.

Jesus often spoke directly to women in public. The disciples were astonished to see Jesus talking with the Samaritan woman at the well of Sychar (John 4:7–26). He spoke freely with the woman taken in adultery (John 8:10–11), with the widow of Nain (Luke 7:12–13), the woman with the bleeding disorder (Luke 8:48; cf. Matt. 9:22; Mark 5:34), and a woman who called to him from a crowd (Luke 11:27–28). Similarly, Jesus addressed a woman bent over for eighteen years (Luke 13:12) and a group of women on the route to the cross (Luke 23:27–31). Jesus spoke in a thoughtful, caring manner. Each synoptic writer records Jesus addressing the woman with the bleeding disorder tenderly as "daughter" and he refers to the bent woman as a "daughter of Abraham" (Luke 13:16). Theologian Donald G. Bloesch infers that "Jesus called the Jewish women 'daughters of Abraham' (Luke 13:16), thereby according them a spiritual status equal to that of men."

Jesus held women personally responsible for their own behavior: for example there's the woman at the well (John 4:16–18), the woman taken in adultery (John 8:10–11), and the sinful woman who anointed his feet (Luke 7:44–50). Jesus dealt with each as having the personal freedom and enough self-determination to deal with their own repentance and forgiveness. There are several Gospel accounts of Jesus imparting important teachings to and about women: his public admiration for a poor widow who donated two copper coins to the Temple in Jerusalem, his friendship with Mary of Bethany and Martha, the sisters of Lazarus, and the presence of Mary Magdalene, his mother, and the other women as he was crucified. New Testament scholar Ben Witherington III says "Jesus broke with both biblical and rabbinic traditions that restricted women's roles in religious practices, and He rejected attempts to devalue the worth of a woman, or her word of witness."

The New Testament names many women among the followers of Jesus and in positions of leadership in the early church. New Testament scholar Linda Belleville says "virtually every leadership role that names a man also names a woman. In fact there are more women named as leaders in the New Testament than men. Phoebe is a 'deacon' and a 'benefactor' (Romans 16:11–12). Mary, Lydia and Nympha are overseers of house churches (Acts 12:12; 16:15; Colossians 4:15). Euodia and Syntyche are among 'the overseers and deacons' at Philippi (Philippians 1:1; cf, 4:2–3). The only role lacking specific female names is that of 'elder'—but there male names are lacking as well."

New Testament scholar Craig Blomberg asserts three primary texts critical to the traditional patriarchal view of women and women's roles as being supported in the New Testament: "1 Corinthians 14:34-35, where women are commanded to be silent in the church; 1 Timothy 2:11–15 where women (according to the TNIV) are not permitted to teach or have authority over a man; and 1 Corinthians 11:2–16 where the male and female relationship is defined in terms of kephalē commonly translated head."

Classics scholar Kyle Harper references the historian Peter Brown as showing ethics concerning sexuality and accepted sexual practices was at the heart of the early clash over Christianity's place in the world. Views on sexuality in the early church were diverse and fiercely debated within its various communities; these doctrinal debates took place within the boundaries of the ideas in Paul's letters and in the context of an often persecuted minority seeking to define itself from the world around it. In his letters, Paul often attempted to find a middle way among these disputes, which included people who saw the gospel as liberating them from all moral boundaries, and those who took very strict moral stances.

Conflicts between Christianity and the culture surrounding it over sexuality, as well as within Christianity itself, were fierce. For example, in Roman culture, widows were required to remarry within a few years of their husband's death, but Christian widows were not required to remarry and could freely choose to remain single, and celibate, with the church's support. As Harper says, "The church developed the radical notion of individual freedom centered around a libertarian paradigm of complete sexual agency." Many widows and single women were choosing not to marry, were staying celibate, and were encouraging other women to follow, but pagan response to this female activity was negative and sometimes violent toward Christianity as a whole. Margaret MacDonald demonstrates these dangerous circumstances were likely the catalysts for the "shift in perspective concerning unmarried women from Paul's [early] days to the time of the Pastoral epistles".

The sexual-ethical structures of Roman society were built on status, and sexual modesty and shame meant something different for men than it did for women, and for the well-born than it did for the poor, and for the free citizen than it did for the slave. In the Roman Empire, shame was a social concept that was always mediated by gender and status. Harper says: "The model of normative sexual behavior that developed out of Paul's reactions to the erotic culture surrounding him...was a distinct alternative to the social order of the Roman empire." For Paul, according to Harper, "the body was a consecrated space, a point of mediation between the individual and the divine." The ethical obligation for sexual self-control was placed equally on all people in the Christian communities, men or women, slave or free. In Paul's letters, porneia, (a single name for an array of sexual behaviors outside marital intercourse), became a central defining concept of sexual morality, and shunning it, a key sign of choosing to follow Jesus. Sexual morality could be shown by forgoing sex altogether and practicing chastity, remaining virgin, or having sex only within a marriage. Harper indicates this was a transformation in the deep logic of sexual morality as personal rather than social, spiritual rather than merely physical, and for everyone rather than solely for those with status.

== Criticism ==
Elizabeth Anderson, a Professor of Philosophy and Women's Studies at the University of Michigan, Ann Arbor, states that "the Bible contains both good and evil teachings", and it is "morally inconsistent". Anderson criticizes what she terms morally repugnant lessons of the New Testament. She claims that "Jesus tells us his mission is to make family members hate one another, so that they shall love him more than their kin" (Matt 10:35–37), that "Disciples must hate their parents, siblings, wives, and children (Luke 14:26)", and that Peter and Paul elevate men over their wives "who must obey their husbands as gods" (1 Corinthians 11:3, 14:34–35, Eph. 5:22–24, Col. 3:18, 1 Tim. 2: 11–12, 1 Pet. 3:1). Anderson states that the Gospel of John implies that "infants and anyone who never had the opportunity to hear about Christ are damned [to hell], through no fault of their own".

Anderson criticizes commands she interprets that God gave to men in the Old Testament, such as: kill adulterers, homosexuals, and "people who work on the Sabbath" (Leviticus 20:10; Leviticus 20:13; Exodus 35:2, respectively); to commit ethnic cleansing (Exodus 34:11–14, Leviticus 26:7–9); commit genocide (Numbers 21: 2–3, Numbers 21:33–35, Deuteronomy 2:26–35, and Joshua 1–12); and other mass killings. Anderson considers the Bible to permit slavery, the beating of slaves, the rape of female captives in wartime, polygamy (for men), the killing of prisoners, and child sacrifice. She also provides a number of examples to illustrate what she considers "God's moral character": "Routinely punishes people for the sins of others ... punishes all mothers by condemning them to painful childbirth", punishes four generations of descendants of those who worship other gods, kills 24,000 Israelites because some of them sinned (Numbers 25:1–9), kills 70,000 Israelites for the sin of David in 2 Samuel 24:10–15, and "sends two bears out of the woods to tear forty-two children to pieces" because they called someone names in 2 Kings 2:23–24.

Simon Blackburn states that the "Bible can be read as giving us a carte blanche for harsh attitudes to children, the mentally handicapped, animals, the environment, the divorced, unbelievers, people with various sexual habits, and elderly women".

Blackburn criticizes what he terms morally suspect themes of the New Testament. He notes some "moral quirks" of Jesus: that he could be "sectarian" (Matt 10:5–6), racist (Matt 15:26 and Mark 7:27), and placed no value on animal life (Luke 8:27–33).

Blackburn provides examples of Old Testament moral criticisms, such as the phrase in Exodus 22:18, which he says has "helped to burn alive tens or hundreds of thousands of women in Europe and America": "Thou shalt not suffer a witch to live." He states that the Old Testament God apparently has "no problems with a slave-owning society", considers birth control a crime punishable by death, and "is keen on child abuse". Additional examples that are questioned today are: the prohibition on touching women during their "period of menstrual uncleanliness (Lev. 15:19–24)", the apparent approval of selling daughters into slavery (Exodus 21:7), and the obligation to put to death someone working on the Sabbath (Exodus 35:2).

== See also ==
- Antisemitism and the New Testament
- But to bring a sword
- Ethics
- Ethics in religion
