= Shem Tov Bible =

The Shem Tov Bible is a Hebrew Bible produced by Shem Tov ben Abraham ibn Gaon. It was produced in Soria in Castile by Shem Tov in 1312. it is one of the few manuscripts linked to the Hillel Codex

It was bought by David Solomon Sassoon in 1909 from the Seror family.

It was sold at auction at Sotheby's in 15 September 2024 with a pre-sale estimate of $5–7 million. and sold for $6.9 million
