= Tefillin Barbie =

Tefillin Barbie is a creation of Jen Taylor Friedman, first produced in 2006. It is a Mattel Barbie doll wearing a tallit and tefillin. Tefillin Barbie has also been depicted as reading from a Sefer Torah, holding said Torah aloft in the performance of Hagbaha, holding a siddur, and studying a volume of Talmud.

Tefillin Barbie has been the subject of articles in the Jewish Journal of Greater Los Angeles, Lilith Magazine, the London Jewish Chronicle, the New Jersey Jewish News, and The Forward.
