= Soferet (film) =

Soferet: A Special Scribe
- Aviel Barclay writing a Torah scroll
- Directed by: Donna and Daniel Zuckerbrot
- Produced by: Donna and Daniel Zuckerbrot
- Cinematography: Andrew Binnington
- Edited by: Michèle Hozer
- Music by: Aaron Davis; John Lang
- Release date: May 2006
- Running time: 48 mminutes
- Countries: Canada; Israel; United States
- Language: English

Soferet: A Special Scribe is a 2006 television documentary about Aviel Barclay, who studied to become a sofer, which is a traditionally male position transcribing Jewish Hebrew texts. The documentary explains how she became the world's first known traditionally trained female scribe in October 2003. The film explores the importance of the Torah in Jewish life, the perfection required to execute a kosher Torah scroll, and a feminist perspective on the battle waged by some Jewish women to assume responsibilities traditionally reserved for men.

== Summary ==
Barclay was born into a Christian family in Prince George, Canada. As a girl, she enjoyed calligraphy and taught herself the letters of the Hebrew alphabet by the age of 10. She converted to Judaism as an adult and joined the Orthodox Jewish community. The film chronicles Aviel Barclay studying to become a sofer (Jewish scribe) in Orthodox Judaism.

== See also ==
- Sofer
- Judaism
- Torah
- Who is a Jew?
- Role of women in Judaism
