= Hebrew Bible =

Jewish canon of Hebrew biblical scriptures

- תָּנָ״ךְ Tanakh
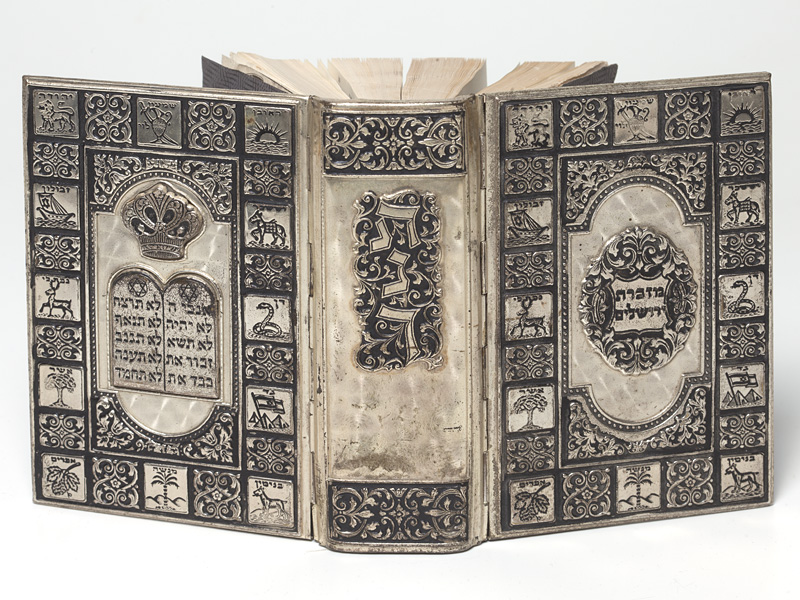
- Hebrew Bible (Tanakh) in the collection of the Jewish Museum of Switzerland, printed in Israel in 1962

Information
- Religion: Judaism
- Language: Biblical Hebrew (almost all); Biblical Aramaic (Daniel 2:4b–7:28, Ezra 4:8–6:18 and 7:12–26, and Jeremiah 10:11)
- Period: 8th/7th centuries BCE – 2nd/1st centuries BCE
- Books: 24
- Hebrew Bible at Hebrew Wikisource

The Hebrew Bible, Jewish Bible, or Tanakh (Note: Also spelled Tanach and Tenakh.) (US: /tɑːˈnɑːx/, UK: /tæˈnæx/ or /təˈnæx/; Hebrew: תַּנַ״ךְ, romanized: tanaḵ; תָּנָ״ךְ, tānāḵ; or תְּנַ״ךְ, tənaḵ), also known in Hebrew as Mikra (/miːˈkrɑː/; מִקְרָא, miqrāʾ), is the canonical collection of Hebrew scriptures, comprising the Torah (lit. 'Teaching' or 'Instruction'; the five books of Moses), the Nevi'im (lit. 'Prophets'), and the Ketuvim (lit. 'Writings').

The modern form of the Hebrew Bible that is authoritative in Judaism is the Masoretic Text (7th to 10th centuries CE), which consists of 24 books, divided into parashot (paragraphs or sections) and pesukim (verses). The Masoretic Text, compiled by Jewish scribes and scholars of the early Middle Ages, is one of several texts considered authoritative by different types of Judaism throughout history. The Masoretic Text is mostly in Biblical Hebrew, with a few passages in Biblical Aramaic (in the books of Daniel and Ezra, and the verse Jeremiah 10:11). The Hebrew Bible developed during the Second Temple Period, as Jewish sages decided which religious texts were of divine origin. The Hellenized Greek-speaking Jews of Alexandria produced a Greek translation of the Hebrew Bible called "the Septuagint", that included books later identified as apocrypha, while Samaritans produced their own version of the Torah, the Samaritan Pentateuch.

In addition to the Masoretic Text, modern biblical scholars seeking to understand the history of the Hebrew Bible use a range of sources. These include the Septuagint, the Syriac language Peshitta translation, the Samaritan Pentateuch, the Dead Sea Scrolls collection, the Targum Onkelos, and quotations from rabbinic manuscripts. These sources may be older than the Masoretic Text in some cases and often differ from it. Such differences have given rise to the theory that yet another text, an Urtext of the Hebrew Bible, once existed and is the source of the versions extant today. However, such an Urtext has never been found, and which of the three commonly known versions (Septuagint, Masoretic Text, Samaritan Pentateuch) is closest to the Urtext is debated.

The Septuagint was influential on early Christianity and there are many similarities between the Hebrew Bible and the Christian Old Testament. In Islam, the Tawrat (Arabic: توراة) is often identified not only with the Pentateuch, but also with the other books of the Hebrew Bible.

Scholars increasingly view the Hebrew Bible as a mix of folklore and history, with some narratives after the 9th century BCE partly supported by archaeology but many traditional accounts debated or questioned.

== Terminology ==
=== Tanakh ===
Tanakh is an acronym derived from the first Hebrew letter of each of the Masoretic Text's three traditional divisions: the Torah (תּוֹרָה, Tōrāh, lit. 'Instruction' or 'Teaching' or 'Law'), the Nevi'im (נְבִיאִים, Nĕvīʾīm, 'Prophets'), and the Ketuvim (כְּתוּבִים, Kĕtûvīm, 'Writings').

The three-part division reflected in the acronym Tanakh is well attested in the Rabbinic literature dating from the Masoretic period. During that period, however, the term Tanakh was not used; rather, the proper title was Mikra or Miqra (מִקְרָא), meaning "reading" or "that which is read", because the biblical texts were read publicly. The acronym Tanakh is first recorded in the Masorah Magna (lit. 'Great Masorah') (Note: Hebrew: מסורה גדולה, romanized: Masōrāh Gĕdōlāh, lit. 'Great Masorah') of the Hebrew Bible, and it later entered broader Jewish use via the responsa of Rabbi Shlomo ben Avraham ibn Aderet (1235–1310) compiled in Teshuvot haRashba. (Note: Full title: שו״ת הרשב״א, Šĕʾēlôt û‑Tĕšûvôt ha‑Rašbāʾ, 'Questions and Answers of the Rashba') Mikra continues to be used in Hebrew, alongside Tanakh, to refer to the Hebrew scriptures. In spoken Modern Hebrew, they are interchangeable.

=== Hebrew Bible ===
Many biblical studies scholars advocate use of the term Hebrew Bible (or Hebrew Scriptures) as a substitute for less-neutral terms with Jewish or Christian connotations like Tanakh or Old Testament, respectively. The Society of Biblical Literature's Handbook of Style, which is the standard for major academic journals like the Harvard Theological Review and conservative Protestant journals like the Bibliotheca Sacra and the Westminster Theological Journal, suggests that authors "be aware of the connotations of alternative expressions such as ... Hebrew Bible [and] Old Testament" without prescribing the use of either.

"Hebrew" refers to the original language of the books, but it may also be taken as referring to the Jews of the Second Temple period and their descendants, who preserved the transmission of the Masoretic Text up to the present day. The Hebrew Bible includes small portions in Biblical Aramaic (mostly in the books of Daniel and Ezra), written and printed in Aramaic square-script, which was adopted as the Hebrew alphabet after the Babylonian captivity.

== Content ==
=== Genres and themes ===
The Tanakh includes a variety of genres, including narratives of events set in the past. The Torah, which is composed of the books of Genesis (בְּרֵאשִׁית, bᵉrēʾšīt), Exodus (שְׁמוֹת, šᵉmōt), Leviticus (וַיִּקְרָא, vayyīqrāʾ), Numbers (בְּמִדְבַּר, bᵉmidbar), and Deuteronomy (דְּבָרִים, dᵉvarīm), contains the foundational narrative of the Israelites and the Law of Moses.

The book of Psalms (סֵפֶר תְּהִלִּים, sēfer təhillīm) is a collection of hymns, but songs are included elsewhere in the Tanakh, such as Exodus 15, 1 Samuel 2, and Jonah 2. Books such as Proverbs (מִשְׁלֵי, mišlê) and Ecclesiastes (קֹהֶלֶת, qōhelet) are examples of wisdom literature.

Other books are examples of prophecy. In the prophetic books, a prophet denounces evil or predicts what God will do in the future. A prophet might also describe and interpret visions. The book of Daniel (סֵפֶר דָּנִיֵּאל, sēfer dāniyyēl) is the only book in the Tanakh usually described as apocalyptic literature. However, other books or parts of books have been called proto‑apocalyptic, such as Isaiah 24–27, the book of Joel (סֵפֶר יוֹאֵל, sēfer yōʾēl), and Zechariah 9–14. The book of Ezekiel (סֵפֶר יְחֶזְקֵאל, sēfer yᵉḥezqēl) has been mentioned as a proto‑apocalyptic text as well, but it has been considered controversial.

A central theme throughout the Tanakh is monotheism, worshiping one God. The Tanakh was created by the Israelites, a people who lived within the cultural and religious context of the ancient Near East. The religions of the ancient Near East were polytheistic, but the Israelites rejected polytheism in favor of monotheism. Biblical scholar Christine Hayes writes that the Hebrew Bible was "the record of [the Israelites'] religious and cultural revolution".

According to biblical scholar John Barton, "YHWH is consistently presented throughout the [Hebrew Scriptures] as the God who created the world, and as the only God with whom Israel is to be concerned". This special relationship between God and Israel is described in terms of covenant. As part of the covenant, God gives his people the Promised Land as an eternal possession. The God of the covenant is also a God of redemption. God liberates his people from Egypt and continually intervenes to save them from their enemies.

The Tanakh imposes ethical requirements, including social justice and ritual purity. The Tanakh forbids the exploitation of widows, orphans, and other vulnerable groups by the Israelites, including any non-Israelites dwelling among them. In addition, the Tanakh condemns murder, theft, bribery, corruption, deceitful trading, adultery, incest, bestiality, and homosexual acts. Another theme of the Tanakh is theodicy; the narrative presents God as fundamentally just even though evil and suffering are present in the world.

=== Narrative ===
The Tanakh begins with the Genesis creation narrative. Genesis 12–50 traces Israelite origins to the patriarchs: Abraham, his son Isaac, and his grandson Jacob (who is later renamed Israel). God promises Abraham and his descendants blessings and land. God establishes a covenant with Abraham that is embodied via Abraham's act of self‑circumcision and God's commandment (מִצְוָה, miṣwāh, 'commandment') that all Israelite males be circumcised eight days postpartum in a ritual known as brit milah (בְּרִית מִילָה, bĕrît mîlāh, 'covenant [of] circumcision'), which continues to be observed within the Jewish community. The children of Jacob become the ancestors of the Twelve Tribes of Israel. Jacob's son Joseph is sold into slavery by his brothers, but he becomes a powerful man in Egypt. During a famine, Jacob and his family settle in Egypt.

Jacob's descendants live in Egypt for 430 years. After the Exodus, the Israelites wander in the wilderness for 40 years. God gives the Israelites the Law of Moses to guide their behavior. The Law includes rules for both religious ritual and ethics, and it requires justice and care for the poor, widows, and orphans. The biblical story affirms God's unconditional love for his people, but he still punishes them when they fail to live by the covenant.

God leads Israel into the Promised Land of Canaan, which they conquer after five years. For the next 470 years, the Israelites are led by judges. In time, a new enemy emerges called the Philistines. They continue to trouble Israel throughout the prophethood and leader of Samuel (1 Samuel 4:1–7:1). When Samuel grows old, the people request that he choose a king; Samuel's sons are corrupt, and they want to live like their non-Israelite neighbors (1 Samuel 8). The Tanakh presents this negatively as a rejection of God's kingship; nevertheless, God permits it, and Saul of the tribe of Benjamin is anointed king. This inaugurates the united monarchy of the Kingdom of Israel.

An officer in Saul's army named David achieves great military success. Saul tries to kill him out of jealousy, but David successfully escapes (1 Samuel 16–29). After Saul dies fighting the Philistines (1 Samuel 31 and 2 Chronicles 10), the kingdom is divided between his son Ish-bosheth (also known as Eshbaal) and David: David rules the lands of the tribe of Judah, of which he is a member, and Ish-bosheth rules the rest. After Ish-bosheth's assassination, David is anointed king over all of Israel (2 Samuel 2–5).

David captures the Jebusite city of Jerusalem (2 Samuel 5:6–7) and makes it his capital. Jerusalem's position between Judah in the southern hills and the northern Israelite tribes makes it an ideal site from which to rule all the tribes. He further increases Jerusalem's importance by bringing the Ark of the Covenant there from Shiloh (2 Samuel 6). David's son Solomon later builds the First Temple in Jerusalem.

After Solomon's death, the united kingdom split into the northern Kingdom of Israel (also known as the Kingdom of Samaria), with its capital being the city of Samaria and the southern Kingdom of Judah having Jerusalem as its capital. The Kingdom of Samaria existed for 200 years before being conquered by the Neo-Assyrian Empire c. 722 BCE. The Kingdom of Judah existed for longer, being conquered by the Neo-Babylonian Empire in 587–586 BCE. The Temple was destroyed, and many Judaeans were exiled to Babylon. In 539 BCE, Babylon was conquered by Cyrus the Great of Persia, who granted the Judaean exiles freedom to return to Zion (i.e., Judah). Between 520 and 515 BCE, the Temple was rebuilt, beginning the Second Temple period.

== Development ==
=== Traditional attribution ===
Religious tradition ascribes authorship of the Torah to Moses. In later Biblical texts, such as Daniel 9:11 and Ezra 3:2, it is referred to as the "Torah (Law) of Moses". However, the Torah itself credits Moses with writing only some specific sections. (Note: See Exodus 17:14, 24:4, 34:28; Numbers 33:2; and Deuteronomy 31:9, 31:22.) It is theorized that Moses would have lived in the 2nd millennium BCE, but this was before the development of Hebrew writing. The Torah is dated to the 1st millennium BCE after Israel and Judah had already developed as states. Nevertheless, "it is highly likely that extensive oral transmission of proverbs, stories, and songs took place during this period", and these may have been included in the Hebrew Bible. Elements of Genesis 12–50, which describes the patriarchal age, and the Book of Exodus may reflect oral traditions. In these stories, Israelite ancestors such as Jacob and Moses use trickery and deception to survive and thrive.

King David (c. 1000 BCE) is credited as the author of at least 73 of the Biblical Psalms. His son, Solomon, is identified as the author of Book of Proverbs, Ecclesiastes, and Song of Solomon. The Hebrew Bible describes their reigns as a golden age when Israel flourished both culturally and militarily. However, there is no archeological evidence for this, and it is most likely a "retrospective extrapolation" of conditions under King Jeroboam II (r. 781–742 BCE).

=== Before the exile ===
Modern scholars, like Israel Finkelstein, believe that the ancient Israelites mostly originated from within Canaan. Their material culture was closely related to their Canaanite neighbors, and Hebrew was a Canaanite dialect. Archaeological evidence indicates Israel began as loosely organized tribal villages in the hill country of modern-day Israel c. 1250 – c. 1000 BCE. During crises, these tribes formed temporary alliances. The Book of Judges, written c. 600 BCE (around 500 years after the events it describes), portrays Israel as a grouping of decentralized tribes, and the Song of Deborah in Judges 5 may reflect older oral traditions. It features archaic elements of Hebrew and a tribal list that identifies Israel exclusively with the northern tribes.

By the 9th or 8th centuries BCE, the scribal culture of Samaria and Judah was sufficiently developed to produce biblical texts. The Kingdom of Samaria was more powerful and culturally advanced than the Kingdom of Judah. It also featured multiple cultic sites, including the sanctuaries at Bethel and Dan.

Scholars estimate that the Jacob tradition (Genesis 25–35) was first written down in the 8th century BCE and probably originated in the north because the stories occur there. Based on the prominence given to the sanctuary at Bethel (Genesis 28), these stories were likely preserved and written down at that religious center. This means the Jacob cycle must be older than the time of King Josiah of Judah (r. 640 – 609 BCE), who pushed for the centralization of worship at Jerusalem.

The story of Moses and the Exodus appears to also originate in the north. It existed as a self-contained story in its oral and earliest written forms, but it was connected to the patriarchal stories during the exile or post-exile periods. The account of Moses's birth (Exodus 2) shows similarities to the birth of Sargon of Akkad, which suggests Neo-Assyrian influence sometime after 722 BCE. While the Moses story is set in Egypt, it is used to tell both an anti-Assyrian and anti-imperial message, all while appropriating Assyrian story patterns. David M. Carr notes the possibility of an early oral tradition for the Exodus story: "To be sure, there may have been a 'Moses group,' themselves of Canaanite extraction, who experienced slavery and liberation from Egypt, but most scholars believe that such a group—if it existed—was only a small minority in early Israel, even though their story came to be claimed by all."

Scholars believe Psalm 45 could have northern origins since it refers to a king marrying a foreign princess, a policy of the Omrides. Some psalms may have originated from the shrine in the northern city of Dan. These are the Sons of Korah psalms, Psalm 29, and Psalm 68. The city of Dan probably became an Israelite city during the reign of King Jeroboam II (781–742 BCE). Before then, it belonged to Aram, and Psalm 20 is nearly identical to an Aramaic psalm found in the 4th century BCE Papyrus Amherst 63.

The author of the Books of Kings likely lived in Jerusalem. The text shows a clear bias favoring Judah, where God's worship was centralized in Jerusalem. The Kingdom of Samaria is portrayed as a godless breakaway region whose rulers refuse to worship at Jerusalem.

=== Fixing the canon ===
The books that make up the Hebrew Bible were composed and edited in stages over several hundred years. According to biblical scholar John J. Collins, "It now seems clear that all the Hebrew Bible received its final shape in the postexilic, or Second Temple, period."

Traditionally, Moses was considered the author of the Torah, and this part of the Tanakh achieved authoritative or canonical status first, possibly as early as the 5th century BCE. This is suggested by Ezra 7:6, which describes Ezra as "a scribe skilled in the law (torah) of Moses that the Lord the God of Israel had given".

The Nevi'im had gained canonical status by the 2nd century BCE. There are references to the "Law and the Prophets" in the Book of Sirach, the Dead Sea Scrolls, and the New Testament. The Book of Daniel, written c. 164 BCE, was not grouped with the Prophets presumably because the Nevi'im collection was already fixed by this time.

The Ketuvim was the last part of the Tanakh to achieve canonical status. The prologue to the Book of Sirach mentions "other writings" along with the Law and Prophets but does not specify the content. The Gospel of Luke refers to "the Law of Moses, the prophets, and the psalms" (Luke 24:44). These references suggest that the content of the Ketuvim remained fluid until the canonization process was completed in the 2nd-century CE.

There is no scholarly consensus as to when the Hebrew Bible canon was fixed: some scholars argue that it was fixed by the Hasmonean dynasty, while others argue it was not fixed until the second century CE or even later. The speculated late-1st-century Council of Jamnia was once credited with fixing the Hebrew canon, but modern scholars believe there was no such authoritative council of rabbis. Between 70 and 100 CE, rabbis debated whether certain books "make the hands unclean" (meaning the books are holy and should be considered scripture), and references to fixed numbers of canonical books appear. There were several criteria for inclusion. Books had to be older than the 4th century BCE or attributed to an author who had lived before that period. The original language had to be Hebrew, and books had to be widely used. Many books considered scripture by certain Jewish communities were excluded during this time.

The inter-relationship between various significant ancient manuscripts of the Hebrew Bible (some identified by their siglum). Mt being the Masoretic text. The lowermost text "(lost)" would be the Urtext.

There are various textual variants in the Hebrew Bible resulting from centuries of hand-copying. Scribes introduced thousands of minor changes to the biblical texts. Sometimes, these changes were by accident. At other times, scribes intentionally added clarifications or theological material. In the Middle Ages, Jewish scribes produced the Masoretic Text, which became the authoritative version of the Tanakh. Ancient Hebrew was written without vowels, but the Masoretes added vowel markings to the text to ensure accuracy.

According to the Talmud, much of the Tanakh was compiled by the men of the Great Assembly (Anshei K'nesset HaGedolah), a task completed in 450 BCE, and it has remained unchanged ever since. The 24-book canon is mentioned in the Midrash Koheleth 12:12: Whoever brings together in his house more than twenty four books brings confusion.

== Language and pronunciation ==
The original writing system of the Hebrew text was an abjad: consonants written with some applied vowel letters ("matres lectionis"). During the early Middle Ages, scholars known as the Masoretes created a single formalized system of vocalization. This was chiefly done by Aaron ben Moses ben Asher, in the Tiberias school, based on the oral tradition for reading the Tanakh, hence the name Tiberian vocalization. It also included some innovations of Ben Naphtali and the Babylonian exiles. Despite the comparatively late process of codification, some traditional sources and some Orthodox Jews hold the pronunciation and cantillation to derive from the revelation at Sinai, since it is impossible to read the original text without pronunciations and cantillation pauses. The combination of a text (מקרא mikra), pronunciation (ניקוד niqqud) and cantillation (טעמים te`amim) enable the reader to understand both the simple meaning and the nuances in sentence flow of the text.

=== Number of different words used ===
The number of distinct words in the Hebrew Bible is 8,679, of which 1,480 are hapax legomena, words or expressions that occur only once. The number of distinct Semitic roots, on which many of these biblical words are based, is roughly 2000.

== Books ==
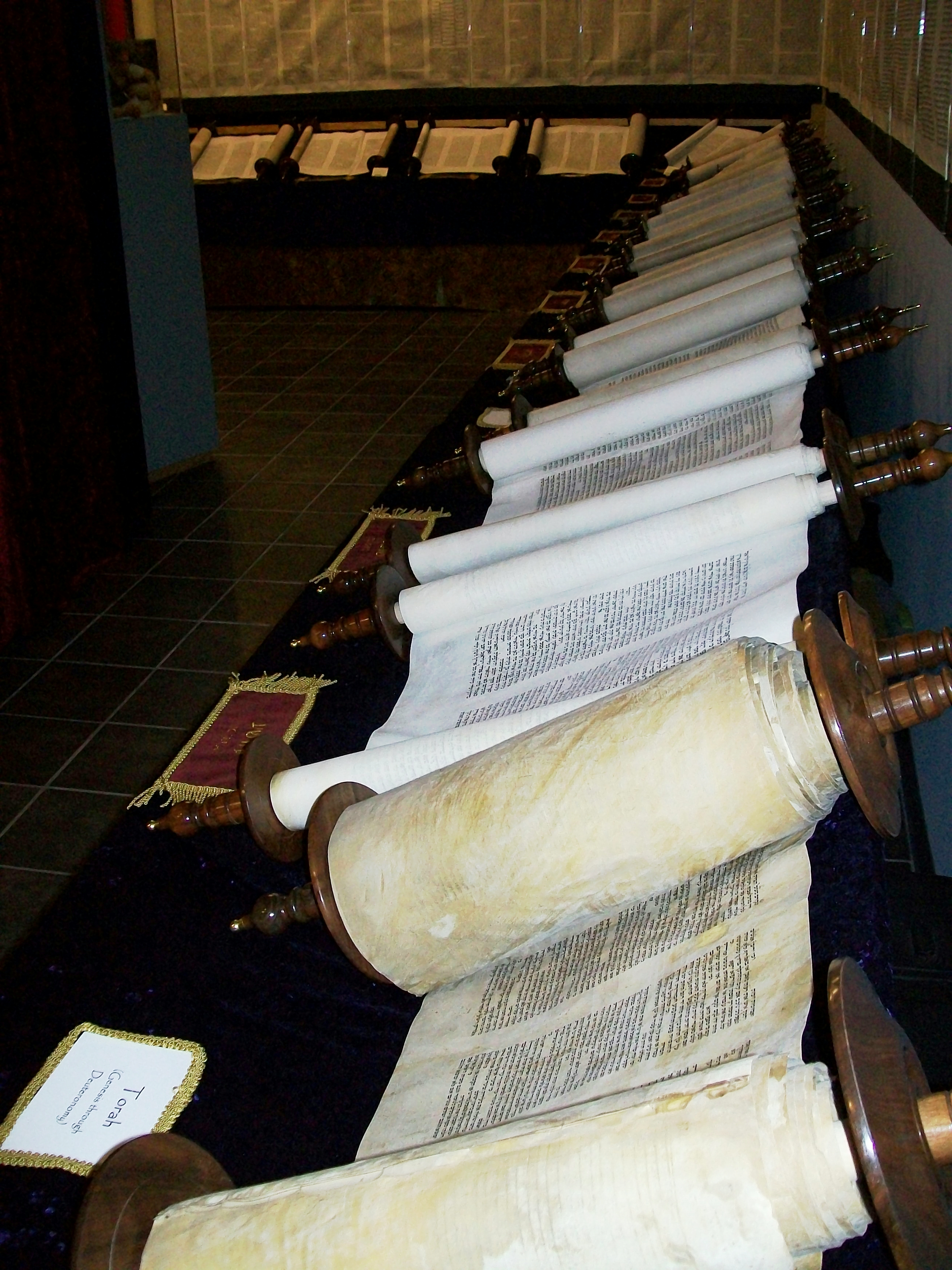
A complete set of scrolls constituting the Tanakh

The Tanakh consists of twenty-four books, counting as one book each 1 Samuel and 2 Samuel, 1 Kings and 2 Kings, 1 Chronicles and 2 Chronicles, and Ezra–Nehemiah. The Twelve Minor Prophets (תרי עשר) are also counted as a single book. In Hebrew, the books are often referred to by their prominent first words.

=== Torah ===
The Torah (תּוֹרָה, literally "teaching") is also known as the "Pentateuch", or as the "Five Books of Moses". Printed versions (rather than scrolls) of the Torah are often called Chamisha Chumshei Torah (חמישה חומשי תורה "Five fifth-sections of the Torah") and informally as Chumash.

- Bərē'šīṯ (בְּרֵאשִׁית, literally "In the beginning") – Genesis
- Šəmōṯ (שְׁמֹות, literally "The names of") – Exodus
- Vayyīqrā' (וַיִּקְרָא, literally "And he called") – Leviticus
- Bəmīḏbar (בְּמִדְבַּר, literally "In the desert of") – Numbers
- Dəvārīm (דְּבָרִים, literally "Things" or "Words") – Deuteronomy

=== Nevi'im ===
Nevi'im (נְבִיאִים Nəḇīʾīm, "Prophets") is the second main division of the Tanakh, between the Torah and Ketuvim. This division includes the books which cover the time from the entrance of the Israelites into the Land of Israel until the Babylonian captivity of Judah (the "period of prophecy"). Their distribution is not chronological, but substantive.

The Former Prophets (נביאים ראשונים Nevi'im Rishonim):

- Yəhōšúaʿ (יְהוֹשֻעַ) – Joshua
- Šōfṭīm (שֹׁפְטִים) – Judges
- Šəmūʾēl (שְׁמוּאֵל) – Samuel
- Məlāḵīm (מְלָכִים) – Kings

The Latter Prophets (נביאים אחרונים Nevi'im Aharonim):

- Yəšaʿyāhū (יְשַׁעְיָהוּ) – Isaiah
- Yīrməyāhū (יִרְמְיָהוּ) – Jeremiah
- Yəḥezqēʾl (יְחֶזְקֵאל) – Ezekiel

The Twelve Minor Prophets (תרי עשר, Trei Asar, "The Twelve"), which are considered one book:

- Hōšēaʿ (הוֹשֵׁעַ) – Hosea
- Yōʾēl (יוֹאֵל) – Joel
- ʿĀmōs (עָמוֹס) – Amos
- ʿŌḇaḏyā (עֹבַדְיָה) – Obadiah
- Yōnā (יוֹנָה) – Jonah
- Mīḵā (מִיכָה) – Micah
- Naḥūm (נַחוּם) – Nahum
- Ḥăḇaqqūq (חֲבַקּוּק) – Habakkuk
- Ṣəfanyā (צְפַנְיָה) – Zephaniah
- Ḥaggay (חַגַּי) – Haggai
- Zəḵaryā (זְכַרְיָה) – Zechariah
- Malʾāḵī (מַלְאָכִי) – Malachi

=== Ketuvim ===
Kəṯūḇīm (כְּתוּבִים, "Writings") consists of eleven books.

==== Lyrical books ====
In Masoretic manuscripts (and some printed editions), Psalms, Proverbs and Job are presented in a special two-column form emphasizing the parallel stichs in the verses, which are a function of their poetry. Collectively, these three books are known as Sifrei Emet (an acronym of the titles in Hebrew, איוב, משלי, תהלים yields Emet אמ"ת, which is also the Hebrew for "truth").

These three books are also the only ones in Tanakh with a special system of cantillation notes that are designed to emphasize parallel stichs within verses. However, the beginning and end of the book of Job are in the normal prose system.

- Təhīllīm (תְהִלִּים) – Psalms
- Mīšlē (מִשְׁלֵי) – Proverbs
- 'Īyyōḇ (אִיּוֹב) – Job

==== Five scrolls ====
The five relatively short books of the Song of Songs, Ruth, Lamentations, Ecclesiastes, and Esther are collectively known as the Ḥamesh Megillot (Five Megillot).

In many Jewish communities, these books are read aloud in the synagogue on particular occasions, the occasion listed below in parentheses.

- Šīr hašŠīrīm (שִׁיר הַשִּׁירִים) – Song of Songs, also known as Song of Solomon (on Passover)
- Rūṯ (רוּת) – Ruth (on Shavuot)
- 'Ēḵā (אֵיכָה) – Lamentations (on Tisha B'Av)
- Qōheleṯ (קֹהֶלֶת) – Ecclesiastes (on Sukkot)
- 'Esṯēr (אֶסְתֵר) – Esther (on Purim)

==== Other books ====
Besides the three lyrical books and the five scrolls, the remaining books in Ketuvim are Daniel, Ezra–Nehemiah and Chronicles. Although there is no formal grouping for these books in the Jewish tradition, they nevertheless share a number of distinguishing characteristics: their narratives all openly describe relatively late events (i.e. the Babylonian captivity and the subsequent restoration of Zion); the Talmudic tradition ascribes late authorship to all of them; two of them (Daniel and Ezra) are the only books in Tanakh with significant portions in Aramaic.

- Dānīyyē'l (דָּנִיֵּאל) – Daniel
- 'Ezrā' (עֶזְרָא) – Ezra and Nehemiah
- Dīvrē hayYāmīm (דִּבְרֵי הַיָּמִים) – Chronicles

==== Book order ====
The Jewish textual tradition never finalized the order of the books in Ketuvim. The Talmud gives their order as Ruth, Psalms, Job, Proverbs, Ecclesiastes, Song of Songs, Lamentations, Daniel, Scroll of Esther, Ezra, Chronicles. This order is roughly chronological (assuming traditional authorship).

In Tiberian Masoretic codices (including the Aleppo Codex and the Leningrad Codex), and often in old Spanish manuscripts as well, the order is Chronicles, Psalms, Job, Proverbs, Ruth, Song of Songs, Ecclesiastes, Lamentations, Esther, Daniel, Ezra. This order is more thematic (e.g. the megillot are listed together).

=== Number of books ===
The Hebrew Bible is generally considered to consist of 24 books, but this number is somewhat arbitrary, as (for example) it regards 12 separate books of minor prophets as a single book. The traditional rabbinic count of 24 books appears in the Talmud and numerous works of midrash. In several early nonrabbinic sources, the number of books given is 22. This number corresponds to the letters of the Hebrew alphabet; according to Athanasius of Alexandria there were 27 books, corresponding to the alphabet with final letter forms (sofiot).

The count of 24 was said to be equal to the number of priestly divisions. According to a modern source, the number of books may be related to the division of the Iliad and Odyssey into 24 books, corresponding to the letters of the Greek alphabet. Both the Bible and Homer formed "foundational literature" of their respective cultures, studied by children and considered distillations of the society's values. The division of the Bible into 22 books may be a conversion of the Greek system to the Hebrew alphabet, while the division into 24 may be an adoption of the "perfect" number 24 as befitting the Bible's stature in Jewish eyes.

== Nach ==
Nach (pronounced [naχ]; נ״ך, nāḵ; also anglicized Nakh) refers to the Nevi'im and Ketuvim divisions of the Tanakh. Nach is often referred to as its own subject (i.e., separate from the Torah).

Nach is a major subject in the curriculum of Orthodox Jewish day schools for girls and in the seminaries they subsequently attend, and it is often taught by different teachers than those who teach on Chumash (pronounced [χuˈmaʃ]; חֻמָּשׁ, ḥûmāš). The curriculum of Orthodox high schools for boys includes only some portions of Nach, such as the book of Joshua, the book of Judges, and the Five Megillot ([χaˈmeʃ meɡiˈlot]; חֲמֵשׁ מְגִלּוֹת, ḥāmēš megillôt, 'five scrolls').

== Historicity ==
=== Early scholarship ===
Some of the stories of the Pentateuch may derive from older sources. Scholars such as Andrew R. George point out the similarity between the Genesis flood narrative and the Gilgamesh flood myth. (Note: The latter flood myth appears in a Babylonian copy dating to 700 BCE, though many scholars believe that this was probably copied from the Akkadian: Atra-Hasis, which dates to the 18th century BCE. George points out that the modern version of the Epic of Gilgamesh was compiled by Sîn-lēqi-unninni, who lived sometime between 1300 and 1000 BCE.) Similarities between the origin story of Moses and that of Sargon of Akkad were noted by psychoanalyst Otto Rank in 1909 and popularized by 20th-century writers, such as H. G. Wells and Joseph Campbell. Jacob Bronowski writes that "the Bible is ... part folklore and part record. History is ... written by the victors, and the Israelis, when they burst through [Jericho (c. 1400 BCE)], became the carriers of history."

=== Recent scholarship ===
In 2007, a historian of ancient Judaism Lester L. Grabbe explained that earlier biblical scholars such as Julius Wellhausen (1844–1918) could be described as 'maximalist', accepting biblical text unless it has been disproven. Continuing in this tradition, both "the 'substantial historicity' of the patriarchs" and "the unified conquest of the land" were widely accepted in the United States until about the 1970s. Contrarily, Grabbe says that those in his field now "are all minimalists – at least, when it comes to the patriarchal period and the settlement. ... [V]ery few are willing to operate [as maximalists]."

In 2022, archaeologist Avraham Faust summarized recent scholarship arguing that while early histories of Israel were heavily based on biblical accounts, their reliability has been increasingly questioned over time. He continued that key debates have focused on the historicity of the Patriarchs, the Exodus, the Israelite conquest, and the United Monarchy, with archaeological evidence often challenging these narratives. He concluded that while the minimalist school of the 1990s dismissed the Bible's historical value, mainstream scholarship has balanced skepticism with evidence, recognizing that some biblical traditions align with archaeological findings, particularly from the 9th century BCE onward.

== Translations ==
- The Holy Scriptures According to the Masoretic Text: A New Translation with the aid of Previous Versions & with the Constant Consultation of Jewish Authorities was published in 1917 by the Jewish Publication Society. It was replaced by their Tanakh in 1985
- Tanakh, Jewish Publication Society, 1985, ISBN 0-8276-0252-9
- Tanach: The Stone Edition, Hebrew with English translation, Mesorah Publications, 1996, ISBN 0-89906-269-5, named after benefactor Irving I. Stone.
- Tanakh Ram, an ongoing translation to Modern Hebrew (2010–) by Avraham Ahuvya (RAM Publishing House Ltd. and Miskal Ltd.)
- The Living Torah and The Living Nach, a 1981 translation of the Torah by Rabbi Aryeh Kaplan and a subsequent posthumous translation of the Nevi'im and Ketuvim following the model of the first volume
- The Koren Jerusalem Bible is a Hebrew/English Tanakh by Koren Publishers Jerusalem and was the first Bible published in modern Israel in 1962

== Jewish commentaries ==
The major commentary used for the Chumash is the Rashi commentary. The Rashi commentary and Metzudot commentary are the major commentaries for the Nach.

There are two major approaches to the study of, and commentary on, the Tanakh. In the Jewish community, the classical approach is a religious study of the Bible, where it is assumed that the Bible is divinely inspired. Another approach is to study the Bible as a human creation. In this approach, Biblical studies can be considered as a sub-field of religious studies. The latter practice, when applied to the Torah, is considered heresy by the Orthodox Jewish community. As such, much modern day Bible commentary written by non-Orthodox authors is considered forbidden by rabbis teaching in Orthodox yeshivas. Some classical rabbinic commentators, such as Abraham ibn Ezra, Gersonides, and Maimonides, used many elements of contemporary biblical criticism, including their knowledge of history, science, and philology. Their use of historical and scientific analysis of the Bible was considered acceptable by historic Judaism due to the author's faith commitment to the idea that God revealed the Torah to Moses on Mount Sinai.

The Modern Orthodox Jewish community allows for a wider array of biblical criticism to be used for biblical books outside of the Torah, and a few Orthodox commentaries now incorporate many of the techniques previously found in the academic world, e.g. the Da'at Miqra series. Non-Orthodox Jews, including those affiliated with Conservative Judaism and Reform Judaism, accept both traditional and secular approaches to Bible studies. "Jewish commentaries on the Bible", discusses Jewish Tanakh commentaries from the Targums to classical rabbinic literature, the midrash literature, the classical medieval commentators, and modern-day commentaries.

== Influence on Jewish identity ==
Multiple scholars have noted the importance of the Hebrew Bible in developing the ethnic and national identity of the Jewish people in antiquity. Fergus Millar wrote that the Bible, serving as "both a national history and a source of law," was one of several key sources that helped establishing a sense of national identity among ancient Jews. David Goodblatt argued that the Bible and related literature served as a key foundation for Jewish nationalism during the Second Temple period, underpinning the collective belief in shared descent, history, and cultural unity. The Bible provided a "national history" that traced the lineage of the Jewish people through the patriarchal narratives and tribal genealogies, establishing a shared ancestral framework that connected contemporary Jews to their historical forebears and consolidated a sense of shared descent.

Several scholars argue that key sections of the Hebrew Bible were deliberately composed during specific historical periods to construct and consolidate a distinct Israelite national consciousness. E. Theodore Mullen, a key proponent of this idea, argued in his first monograph that the "Deuteronomistic History"— including Deuteronomy, Joshua, Judges, Samuel, and Kings—was composed during the Babylonian captivity to reinforce a threatened Judean identity. In another work, he focused on the Tetrateuch—Genesis, Exodus, Leviticus, and Numbers—arguing that these books were compiled during the Persian era to forge a unified ethnic identity. This material, when combined with Deuteronomy, formed the Pentateuch, and its inclusion in the Deuteronomistic History created what David Noel Freedman termed the "primary history."

According to Catholic historian Adrian Hastings, the study of sacred texts, including the Hebrew Bible, was a foundational element that allowed the Jews—whom he describes as the "true proto-nation"—to preserve their national identity during the two millennia following the loss of their political entity in the first century CE. This enduring connection to their heritage enabled Jews to be perceived as a nation rather than merely an ethnic group, ultimately paving the way for the rise of Zionism and the eventual establishment of the State of Israel.

Additionally, biblical laws, such as male circumcision, Shabbat observance, and dietary prohibitions, became defining cultural markers of Jewish identity, distinguishing Jewish communities from surrounding populations. The Bible also played a key role in preserving Hebrew, which, unlike Phoenician and Edomite, survived even as Aramaic replaced other regional languages. The translation of biblical texts into Greek and Aramaic allowed Jewish culture to be expressed across linguistic boundaries, enabling a translingual Jewish identity while maintaining its cultural coherence.

== Influence on Christianity ==
Christianity has long asserted a close relationship between the Hebrew Bible and the New Testament, and the books of the Hebrew Bible are included in the Old Testament of the Christian Bible. In Protestant editions of the Bible, the Old Testament has the same contents as the Hebrew Bible, but the books are arranged differently. The Catholic Bible and the Eastern Orthodox Bible, as well as the Bible in the Oriental Orthodox Churches and the Bible in the Assyrian Church of the East, contains books not included in certain versions of the Hebrew Bible, called Deuterocanonical books.

The ancient translations of the Hebrew Bible currently used by the Roman Catholic and Eastern Orthodox churches are based on the Septuagint, which was considered the authoritative scriptural canon by the early Christians. The Septuagint was influential on early Christianity as it was the Hellenistic Greek translation of the Hebrew Bible primarily used by the 1st-century Christian authors.

Adrian Hastings contended that the model of ancient Israel presented in the Hebrew Bible established the original concept of nationhood, which subsequently influenced the development of nation-states in the Christian world.

== See also ==
- 613 commandments, formal list of Jewish 613 commandments
- 929: Tanakh B'yachad
- Hebrew University Bible Project
- Mikraot Gedolot
- New Jewish Publication Society of America Tanakh
- Non-canonical books referenced in the Bible
- Shem Tov Bible
- Weekly Torah portion
