= Jen Taylor Friedman =

American calligrapher

Jen Taylor Friedman is a soferet (Jewish ritual scribe). On September 9, 2007, she became the first woman known to have completed a Torah scroll. Taylor Friedman's sefer Torah was commissioned by United Hebrew Congregation, a Reform temple in St. Louis, Missouri.

Taylor Friedman was born in Southampton, England, and educated at Oxford. While studying at Oxford, she became interested in halakha (Jewish law) and calligraphy, and by a "chance combination of happy circumstances" she met a sofer (a male scribe) who helped her realize that becoming a soferet would allow her to pursue both interests. Taylor Friedman continued her scribal studies in Jerusalem and New York City. She now resides in Cambridge, England and is a thriving member of her local Jewish community.

Taylor Friedman's first project as a soferet was Megillat Esther, a scroll of the Biblical Book of Esther that is traditionally read in synagogue on the holiday of Purim. She completed the project on Purim 2004 (March 6). Since that time she has prepared six more megillot, including one for Congregation Ansche Chesed, a synagogue on Manhattan's Upper West Side. Friedman oversaw the work of scribes involved with the Women's Torah Project, completed in 2010. In May 2010 she completed her third Torah scroll for Congregation Dorshei Emet, the first synagogue in Canada and the third in the world to receive a Torah handwritten by a woman. In 2018 she completed the first full Torah written in Texas by a woman. Austin's Congregation Agudas Achim requested her to do it for them.

Taylor Friedman is one of a small, but growing, number of soferot (female scribes).

Taylor Friedman is also known for her Tefillin Barbie, which has been featured in a number of prominent Jewish publications.
