= Women's Torah Project =

The Women's Torah Project (WTP) was an initiative to have the first Torah scroll scribed entirely by women. The project began in 2003 and was completed in Seattle in 2010. Wendy Graff was the leader of WTP. The WTP was commissioned by the Seattle-based Kadima Reconstructionist Community.

== History ==
The Women's Torah Project (WTP) produced the first Torah scroll scribed and embellished entirely by women. Commissioned by Seattle-based Kadima, a Jewish Reconstructionist community, the Women's Torah was produced by six female scribes on three continents. Begun in 2003, the project was completed in Seattle in 2010 under the leadership of Wendy Graff.

Kadima had been raising funds to purchase a Sefer Torah for several years when, in the early 2000s, the community's first rabbi, Drorah Setel, suggested instead that Kadima commission a Torah scribed by a woman. Traditional Jewish law had excluded women from scribing a Torah, much as women had been excluded from the rabbinate and cantorial positions. (That legitimacy is still debated within the Orthodox community.) Determined to redress that exclusion, Kadima underwrote the training of two women to become Torah scribes (soferot; Hebrew pronunciation: [/sof'rot/]; fem. sing: soferet), one of whom, Shoshana Gugenheim of Jerusalem, was hired to be the lead scribe for the Women's Torah Project. Rachel Reichhardt, based in São Paulo, Brazil, certified as a soferet by the Seminario Rabínico Latinoamericano in Buenos Aires in 2004, was the second scribe to join the project. Eventually Linda Coppleson of West Orange, New Jersey; Rabbi Hannah Klebansky of Jerusalem, Irma Penn of Winnipeg, Alberta, Canada; and Julie Seltzer, of Berkeley, California, all contributed to completing panels for the Torah. Scribe Jen Taylor Friedman of New York checked and made minor corrections to the completed panels. The panels were also checked by experts in Jerusalem.

== Implements and embellishments ==
Seven women artists from around the world created embellishments for Kadima's Women's Torah. Laurel Robinson of Atlanta was the first artist involved, contributing a carved wooden yad (pointer) and storage box that is inscribed with a poem by poet and liturgist Marcia Falk. Artist sooze bloom deLeon grossman of Vashon Island, Washington, designed and created the pomegranate-motif Torah mantle. The seeds of the pomegranate were crafted from fabric donated to the Women's Torah Project to honor individual women and girls. Grossman also created an extra-large tallit to be shared by groups called to the bima for aliyot during Torah services. The Torah's copper with brown diamond rimonim (Torah finials), were designed and created by metalworker Aimee Golant of San Francisco. Jeweler Andrea Sher-Leff of Austin, Texas, created a silver and garnet buckle, echoing the pomegranate motif, for the belt that holds the Torah scrolls together. Lois Gaylord of Seattle made the silk belt itself and wove the large, feather-motif bima cloth which incorporates a specially designed Star of David weave pattern. Elka Freller of São Paulo made the kiddush cup from blown glass, Brazilian agate and silver. Amy Gilron of Beer Sheva, Israel, made the wood mosaic etz chaim, the pair of spindles to which the parchment panels of the Torah are attached.

== Consecration ==
The Women's Torah was consecrated on Saturday, October 16, 2010, and read from for the first time during a Shabbat service and siyyum (completion celebration) led by Kadima Liturgy Co-chair Sandra Silberstein; the Torah Service was conducted by Rabbi Jane Littman. The first readers (in order) were: Sima Kahn, Neal Sofian, Lois Gaylord, Sandra Silberstein, Leah Knopf, Douglas Brown, Rachel Reichhardt, Wendy Graff and Mollie Price. It resides with the Kadima Reconstructionist Community of Seattle.
