= Sofer =

Jewish scribe

A sofer at work, Ein Bokek, Israel

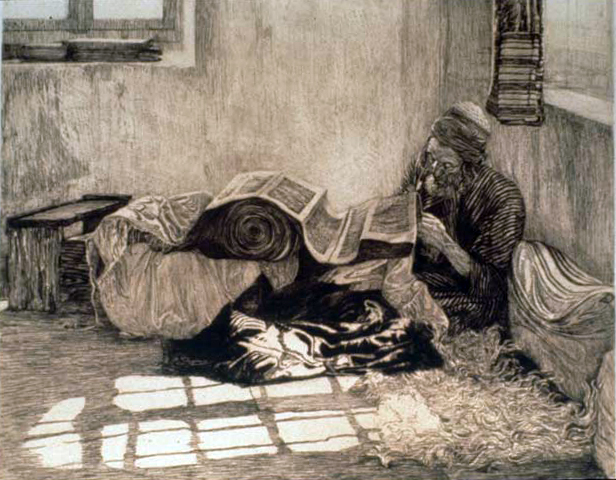
A sofer sews together the pieces of parchment

A sofer, sopher, sofer SeTaM, sofer ST"M (Hebrew: סופר סת״ם, "scribe"; plural soferim, סופרים), or soifer (Yiddish: סויפר) is a Jewish scribe who can transcribe Sifrei Kodesh (holy scrolls), tefillin (phylacteries), mezuzot (ST"M, סת״ם, is an abbreviation of these three terms) and other religious writings.

== Description ==
Soferim are men who are trained and permitted to transcribe Jewish texts according to the laws of Judaism:

- Sefer torah, a complete copy of Torah read by Jewish men during prayer.
- Tefillin, scrolls of Torah verses worn by Jewish adults during prayer.
- Mezuzot, scrolls of Torah verses placed on the doors of Jewish households.

collectively known as ST"M.

By simple definition, soferim are copyists, but their religious role in Judaism is much more. Besides sifrei Torah, tefillin, and mezuzot, scribes are necessary to write the Five Megillot (scrolls of the Song of Songs, Book of Ruth, Book of Esther, Ecclesiastes, and Book of Lamentations), Nevi'im (the books of the prophets, used for reading the haftarah), and for gittin, divorce documents. Many scribes also function as calligraphers—writing functional documents such as ketubot (marriage contracts), or ornamental and artistic renditions of religious texts, which do not require any scribal qualifications, and to which the rules on lettering and parchment specifications do not apply.

The major halakha pertaining to sofrut, the practice of scribal arts, is in the Talmud in the tractate "Maseket Sofrim". In the Torah's 613 commandments, the second to last is that every Jew should write a sefer Torah before they die.

== Qualifications and education ==
A sofer must be religiously observant, of good character, and knowledgeable about the laws concerning sofrut. It is a common misconception that one has to be a rabbi in order to become a sofer.

People who want to become ritual scribes usually learn from another expert scribe by undergoing shimush (apprenticeship), since it would be impossible for someone to be a scribe without any actual practice. Newly certified scribes write Megilat Esther scrolls. The hardest part about learning to be a sofer is not the calligraphy, but, rather, remembering the thousands of laws that apply to sifrei Torah, tefillin, mezuzot, and all the other texts that are written on parchment.

=== Texts teaching sofrut ===
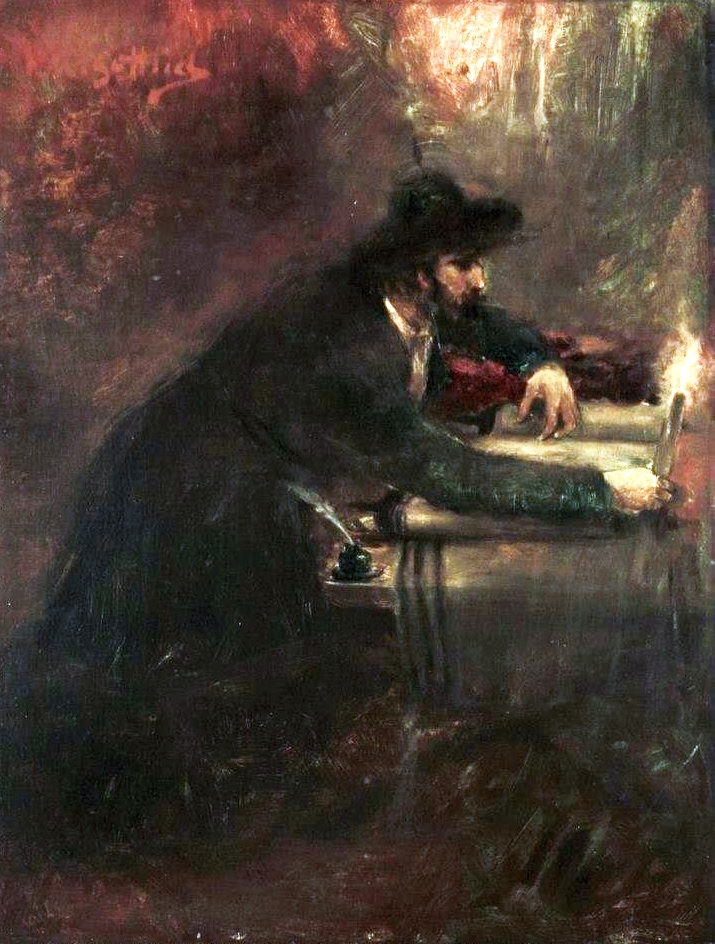
The Torah Scribe by Maurycy Gottlieb, National Museum, Wrocław

The main texts from which Ashkenazi soferim learn the scribal art include the Keset Ha-Sofer, Chasdey David, Mishnah Berurah (24-45), Mishneh Torah (Hilchot Tefillin u'Mezuzah v'Sefer Torah, Hilchot Tzitzit), Mishnat Hasofer, Mishnat Sofrim, and the Likkut Sifrey Stam.

Sephardic soferim rely, in addition to Mishneh Torah (Hilchot Tefillin u'Mezuzah v'Sefer Torah, Hilchot Tzitzit), on Arba'ah Turim, Beit Yosef on Tur, and Shulchan Arukh.

Baladi Rite Yemenite (Teimani) scribes try to follow as closely as possible only the instruction of the Rambam, i.e. Mishneh Torah (Hilchot Tefillin u'Mezuzah v'Sefer Torah, Hilchot Tzitzit), though before Mishneh Torah, their standard was based on the Rama, i.e. Rabbi Meir ben Todros HaLevy Abulafia.

=== Women and sofrut ===
Forming the basis for the discussion of women becoming soferim, Jen Taylor Friedman states, "Sifrei Torah, tefillin and mezuzot written by (some versions insert "a heretic"), an informer (to the Romans), a star-worshipper (some versions substitute "non-Jew"), a slave, a woman, a minor, a Cuthean, or an apostate Jew, are unfit for ritual use" (quoting Gittin 45b). The rulings on mezuzot and tefillin are virtually undisputed among those who hold to the Talmud. Arba'ah Turim does not include women in its list of those ineligible to write Sifrei Torah, some see this as proof that women are permitted to write a sefer Torah. However, today, virtually all Orthodox (both Modern and Ultra) authorities contest the permissibility of a woman's writing a sefer Torah. Yet, women are permitted to inscribe Ketubot (marriage contracts), STaM not intended for ritual use, and other writings of sofrut beyond simple STaM. In 2003, Canadian Aviel Barclay became the world's first known, traditionally trained, soferet.

Among non-Orthodox Jews, women have written Torah scrolls since the early 2000s. In 2007 Jen Taylor Friedman, a British woman, became the first woman to scribe a sefer Torah. In 2010, the first sefer Torah scribed by a group of six women (from Brazil, Canada, Israel, and the United States) was completed; this was known as the Women's Torah Project. Since then, other women have written Torah scrolls. As of 2014, there were an estimated 50 female sofers around the world.

== Documents written by scribes ==
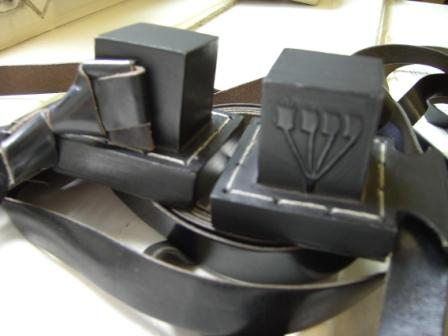
A pair of tefillin. Note the four-pronged Shin

Besides Torah scrolls, tefillin, and mezuzot, scribes are also necessary for the writing of the Five Megillot (scrolls of the Song of Songs, Book of Ruth, Book of Esther, Ecclesiastes, and Book of Lamentations) and Nevi'im (the books of the prophets, used for reading the haftarah), and for gittin (divorce documents). In some communities, especially Chaim Kanievsky's community in Bnei Brak, soferim also write the other books of the Bible, such as Psalms or the Book of Ezra. This was promoted in 19th-century Jerusalem by Rabbi Shemuel Shelomo Boyarski.

== Calligraphy and lettering ==
The first four letters of the Hebrew alphabet as they would be written scribally (a digital approximation)

There are many rules concerning the proper formation of letters that must be followed if a written text is to be deemed religiously valid. The Ashkenazi, Sefardi, Chabad (Lubavitch), and Mizrahi Jews each have their own script for forming the letters, though the same rules apply throughout the text. Generally, regarding sifrei Torah, none of these groups would consider that these differences would render a Torah posul (ritually unfit or invalid).

The documents must be written on properly prepared parchment or vellum known as klaf.

Many scribes also function as calligraphers—writing functional documents like ketubot, or ornamental and artistic renditions of religious texts—which do not require any scribal qualifications, and to which the rules on lettering and parchment specifications do not apply.

== See also ==
- List of sofers
- Scribe
- Tiqqun soferim
- Sefer (disambiguation)
