= Codex Cairensis =

Hebrew codex of the Prophets ascribed to masorete Ben-Asher

click on the picture to see all pages of Codex Cairensis (a PDF file)

The Codex Cairensis (also: Codex Prophetarum Cairensis, Cairo Codex of the Prophets) is a Hebrew manuscript containing the complete text of the Hebrew Bible's Nevi'im (Prophets). It has traditionally been described as "the oldest dated Hebrew Codex of the Bible which has come down to us", but modern research seems to indicate an 11th-century date rather than the 895 CE date written into its colophon. It contains the books of the Former Prophets (Joshua, Judges, Samuel, and Kings) and Latter Prophets (Isaiah, Jeremiah, Ezekiel and the book of the Twelve Minor Prophets). It comprises 575 pages including 13 carpet pages.

== History ==
According to its colophon, it was written complete with niqqud by Moses ben Asher in Tiberias "at the end of the year 827 after the destruction of the second temple" (this corresponds to the year 895 CE, during the reign of the Abbasid caliph al-Mu'tadid). It was given as a present to the Karaite community in Jerusalem and later looted by the Crusaders in 1099. It was redeemed and came into the possession of the Karaite community in Cairo. When the Karaite Jews left Egypt, they deposited the codex in 1983 at Hebrew University of Jerusalem, where it is kept in a secure room on the floor below the Hebrew Manuscript collection. The Codex was brought back to Jerusalem by a committee of six persons.

== Scientific evaluation ==
Although according to its colophon the codex was written by a member of the Ben Asher family, Lazar Lipschütz and others observed that, within the masoretic tradition, Codex Cairensis seems to be closer to ben Naphtali than to Aaron ben Moses ben Asher.

While some scholars consider this to be an argument against its authenticity, Moshe Goshen-Gottstein assumed that ben Naphtali stuck more faithfully to the system of Moses ben Asher than the latter's own son, Aaron ben Moses ben Asher, who corrected the Aleppo Codex and added its punctuation.

More recently, further doubts on its authenticity have been cast by radiocarbon dating and other scientific techniques. It was stated, after scientific investigation, that the scribe must have been a different person from the vocaliser, and the manuscript must be dated to the 11th century, not the 9th.

Umberto Cassuto relied heavily on this codex when producing his edition of the Masoretic Text, which means that in the Prophets his edition is closer to the ben Naphtali tradition than in the Torah or Writings.

Between 1979 and 1992 an editio princeps of the codex (text and masorahs) was published by a team of Spanish scholars. See F. Pérez Castro et alia, El Códice de Profetas de El Cairo, Textos y Estudios "Cardenal Cisneros", CSIC, 8 vols., Madrid 1979–92.

== See also ==
- List of Hebrew Bible manuscripts
  - Aleppo Codex
  - Leningrad Codex
  - Codex Sassoon
  - Codex Orientales
  - Damascus Pentateuch
  - Dead Sea Scrolls

== Sources ==
- Würthwein, Ernst (1974). Der Text des Alten Testaments (in German) (4th ed.). Stuttgart. ISBN 3-438-06006-X.
- Talmon, Shemaryahu, ed. (2004). The Hebrew University Bible Project. Jerusalem: The Hebrew University Magnes Press. ISBN 965-493-186- 9.
- Yeivin, Israel (1980). Introduction to the Tiberian Masorah. Translated by Revell, E. J. ISBN 0-89130-373-1.
- Kahle, Paul E. (1959). The Cairo Geniza (2nd ed.). Oxford: Basil Blackwell. ASIN B0024YG33S.
