= Seligman Baer =

Masoretic scholar

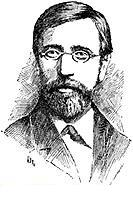
Portrait of Seligman Baer, from the 1906 Jewish Encyclopedia

Seligman (Isaac) Baer (1825–1897) was a Masoretic Text scholar, and an editor of the Hebrew Bible and of the Jewish liturgy. He was born in Mosbach, the northern district of Biebrich, on 18 September 1825 and died at Biebrich-on-the-Rhine in March 1897.

Baer commenced his Masoretic studies as early as 1844. He belonged to the school of Wolf Heidenheim, and had in his possession some of Heidenheim's original manuscripts and personal copies of his published works with handwritten marginal notes. Few scholars in the nineteenth century had so intimate an acquaintance with all the details of the Masorah as had Baer, and it was largely due to him that the study of this branch of Hebrew philology was brought to the notice of Biblical critics. His friendship with Franz Delitzsch, who stood sponsor for much of his work, aided him in making known to the world the results of his studies.

Baer's monumental edition of the Jewish prayerbook according to the Ashkenazic rite, Seder Avodat Yisrael (Rödelheim, 1868), accompanied by a critical commentary, became the authoritative model for numerous editions published subsequently in the 20th century; it came out in two editions: the introduction and the first 588 pages are identical in both, but in one edition the Selichot and piyyutim at the end of the volume are according to the Western Ashkenazic rite, and in the other edition the selichot and piyyutim are according to minhag Polin. His editions of the Jewish liturgy also include Kinnot for the fast of the ninth of Av.

He never occupied an academic position, but was content with the office of Hebrew teacher to the Jewish community of Biebrich. In recognition of his services to the Commission for the History of the Jews in Germany, the honorary degree of doctor of philosophy was conferred upon him by the University of Leipzig. His edition of the Masoretic Bible was published in cooperation with Delitzsch.

== The Masoretic Bible of Baer and Delitzsch ==
Baer's collaboration with Delitzsch began with an edition of the Psalms in 1861 (Leipzig, Doerfling und Franke). A second edition was published a few years later (Leipzig, Brockhaus).

In the meantime, Baer had conceived the plan of editing anew the books of the entire Hebrew Bible, strictly following the Masoretic tradition. The volumes, with a Latin preface by Delitzsch, appeared (Leipzig, Tauchnitz) in the following order: Genesis, 1869; Isaiah, 1872; Job, 1875; Minor Prophets, 1878; Psalms (together with a treatise "Elementa Accentuationis Metricæ"), 1880; Proverbs (together with "De Primorum Vocabulorum Dagessatione"), 1880; Daniel, Ezra, and Nehemiah (together with "Chaldaismi Biblici Adumbratio" and a treatise by Friedrich Delitzsch on the Babylonian proper names in these books), were published in 1882; Ezekiel (with "Specimen Glossarii Ezechielico-Babylonici" by Friedrich Delitzsch), appeared in 1884; followed by the five Megillot, 1886; the book of Chronicles, 1888; Jeremiah, 1890; Joshua and Judges, 1891; and finally Kings, 1895. The last two were edited by Baer alone, Delitzsch having died in 1890.

Death prevented Baer from finishing the series. Attached to each volume were a number of Masoretic notes taken from the best editions and manuscripts, variant readings between the Occidentals and Orientals, between Ben Asher and Ben Naphtali, and various other Masoretic lists and enumerations.

== Criticisms of the work ==
In general, Baer's text has been accepted as representing the Masoretic tradition; even though exception may be taken to his view on individual points or to his too extensive generalization from insufficient manuscript evidence. Christian David Ginsburg, in his introduction to his Masoretic Bible (London, 1897), has criticized a number of these faults with some severity. He points out, among other things, that Baer has indicated the open and closed sections in the Prophets and the Hagiographa, a thing not usually done in Masoretic manuscripts (pp. 10 et seq.); that he has introduced a number of anti-Masoretic pauses (p. 29); that his division of the Sedarim is faulty (p. 41); that he has introduced the dagesh into the first letter of words when the preceding word ends with the same letter (p. 117), as well as the dagesh which follows upon a guttural with silent shewa and a ḥatef-pataḥ under the first of two similar letters (pp. 466, 662), all of which are not warranted by the best manuscripts. The Masoretic notes at the end of Baer's edition are also criticized (p. 92), especially the lists of various readings. Further, the Aramaic paradigms attached to the edition of Daniel, Ezra, and Nehemiah have also been the subject of criticism on the part of Kautzsch ("Grammatik des Biblisch-Aramäischen," p. 23). Many of these faults were due to Baer's inability to consult manuscripts in the large European collections.

== Other Masoretic works ==
Of Baer's separate treatises dealing with the mesorah may be mentioned:

- Torat Emet ("The True Law"; Rödelheim, 1852), on the accentuation of the three poetic books Psalms, Proverbs, and Job. An enlarged edition of this treatise in German, together with Masoretische Uebersichten, was added as an appendix to the first edition of Delitzsch's Commentary on the Psalter (vol. ii., Leipzig, 1860);
- Die Methegsetzung, in Merx's Archiv für Wissensch. Erforschung des Alten Testaments (Halle, 1867, i. 55 et seq.; but compare Grätz, "Monatsschrift," 1887, p. 483);
- his edition (in conjunction with H. L. Strack) of the Diḳduḳe ha-Te'amim of Aaron ben Moses ben Asher (Leipzig, 1879);
- his lengthy criticism of Ginsburg's Masora in Z. D. M. G. 743 et seq.;
- and his contribution of the mesorah to the Rabbinic Bible, which was to have been published by the Romms in Wilna (1894), a work upon which he spent many years.

For his edition of Aaron ben Moses ben Asher's Diḳduḳe ha-Te'amim, Baer made a complete handwritten copy of the Masoretic treatises and lists in the Aleppo Codex in their entirety, as found in the pages that preceded and followed the biblical text. Some of the material from his copy was adapted and published within Diḳduḳe ha-Te'amim, and the entire copy survived in Baer's personal archive (now found in the Ginsburg collection at the Russian National Library, Moscow). Since the Masoretic treatises of the Aleppo codex are now missing, Baer's personal copy allows for a nearly complete reconstruction of the lost material.

== Liturgy and other works ==
Seder Avodat Yisrael, 1901 reprint (full scan of minhag Polin edition).

What Baer did for the Hebrew Bible, he also tried to do for the Jewish prayerbook. His Seder Avodat Yisrael ("Ritual of Israel's Service"; Rödelheim, 1868), is accompanied by a literary and philological commentary called Yakhin Lashon ("Preparatory Study of Language"), which has made the work a standard authority and a model for subsequent Ashkenazic prayerbooks throughout the 20th century and to the present day. Attached to it is the text of the Psalms, accurately vocalized and accented. The siddur came out in two editions: the introduction and the first 588 pages are identical in both, but in one edition the Selichot and piyyutim at the end of the volume are according to the Western Ashkenazic rite, and in the other edition the selichot and piyyutim are according to minhag Polin.

Among Baer's other works may be mentioned:

- Leket Tzvi ["Collation of Tzvi"], Sammlung von Gebeten (Rödelheim, 1855, 1861);
- Tikkun haSofer vehaKore ("Correct Text for the Scribe and Reader"), the Masoretic text of the Pentateuch, together with the laws governing the writing of synagogue scrolls (Rödelheim, 1856);
- Divrei haBerit ("The Words of the Covenant"), on the prayers and observances connected with circumcision (Rödelheim, 1874);
- Totzeot Chayyim ("Issue of Life"), prayers for mourners (ib. 1871);
- Zivchei Tzedek ("Sacrifices of Righteousness") on ritual slaughter (ib. 1876).

During the latter part of his life, Baer ventured into the field of history, and translated for the Commission for the History of the Jews in Germany the Hebrew accounts of the persecutions at the time of the Crusades. The venture was not successful.
