= Meir Abulafia =

Spanish rabbi

Meir Abulafia is commonly known as "the Ramah" (Hebrew: רמ״ה). He should not be confused with Moses Isserles, known as "the Rema" or "the Rama" (Hebrew: רמ״א).

Meir ben Todros HaLevi Abulafia (/ˈmeɪ.ər həˈleɪvi ˌæbuːˈlæfiə/ MAY-ər hə-LAY-vee AB-oo-LAF-ee-ə; c. 1170 – 1244), also known as the Ramah (Hebrew: הרמ״ה, a Hebrew abbreviation), was a major Talmudist and authority on halakha in the Kingdom of León (now in Spain).

== Biography ==
He was the scion of a wealthy and scholarly family, the son of Todros ben Judah, to whom the Parisian physician Judah ben Isaac Messer Leon dedicated his poem, The Conflict of Wisdom and Wealth, which was published in 1214.

In his 30s, he was already one of the three appointed rabbis on the beth din of Toledo. The other two were Joseph ibn Migash and his son, Meir. As the kings of León granted the Jews greater autonomy, Abulafia played a substantial role in establishing ritual regulations for Sephardic Jews. He was also the head of an important yeshiva in Toledo. He was so highly esteemed in Toledo that on his father's death in 1225, the latter's honorary title of nasi was applied to him.

He is well known for beginning the first Maimonidean Controversy over the Mishneh Torah while Maimonides was still alive. Outraged by Maimonides' apparent disbelief in the physical resurrection of the dead, Abulafia wrote a series of letters to the French Jews in Lunel. To his shock and disappointment, they supported Maimonides.

Thirty years later, when controversy erupted over Maimonides' Guide for the Perplexed and the first book (HaMadda 'The Knowledge') of the Mishneh Torah, Abulafia refused to participate.

He died in 1244 in the consejo of Burgos, then under the control of the Royal Union of León and Castile, at the age of 74.

== Works ==
Abulafia was a prolific author. He wrote a huge book of hiddushim on the Talmud entitled Peratei Peratin ("Detail of Details"). It followed the style of Isaac Alfasi and was clearly influenced by Hai ben Sherira, Sherira ben Hanina, Joseph ibn Migash, Rashi, and Maimonides. The only sections of this work that are extant are the parts on Tractates Bava Batra, Sanhedrin, Qiddushin, and a part on the fourth chapter of Gittin, each of which are known as Yad Rama (יד רמה 'Raised Hand), a play on the acronym Ramah.

Abulafia discussed every minute detail of each topic, whether directly related or only peripheral, that arose in the course of Talmudic discussion, and generally included a summary of the main points at the end of the discussion. He wrote it in medieval Rabbinic Aramaic, which is difficult to understand. His work had a great influence on Asher ben Jehiel, who, in turn, influenced his son, Jacob ben Asher. Thus, Abulafia's legal insights were incorporated into the Arba'ah Turim.

Abulafia also penned Halachic responsa in Aramaic, and wrote a commentary on Sefer Yetzirah, entitled Lifnei v'Lifnim. Abulafia is credited with writing the authoritative Torah scroll for Spanish Jewry. Scholars came from Ashkenaz and the Maghreb to copy his master copy. He also wrote an authoritative book of regulations about Torah-writing, called Masoret Seyag La-Torah. Jedidiah Norzi was so impressed by the work that he gave him the honorific title of "expert" on topics concerning the Masoretic Text. Menachem Meiri, however, in his Kiryat Sefer, was more critical of the masoretic work of Abulafia, especially in his layout of the last two lines of the Song of the Sea, which deviated from the arrangement found in the Aleppo Codex and in Maimonides' own Torah scroll, which he had obtained from the ben Asher tracition of Masoretes.

Abulafia's poem "A Letter from the Grave" is famous because he wrote it to his father in his sister's name after her death. It was meant to inform him of her death and comfort him. She died on the Sabbath on the tenth of November 1212.
