= Statistics of the Hebrew Bible =

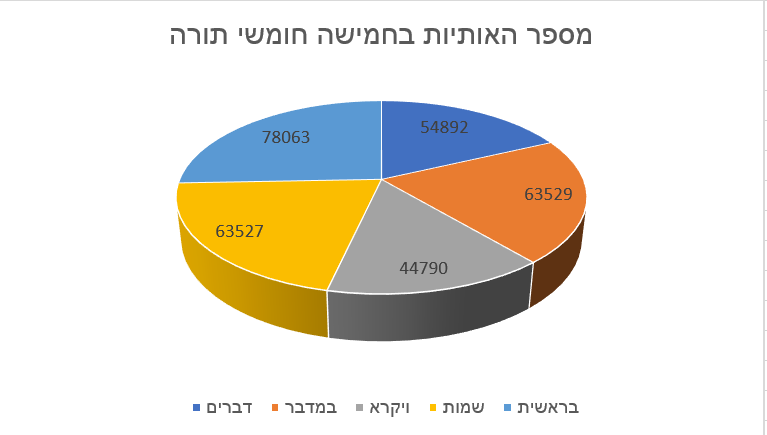
A diagram showing the number of letters in five books of the Torah

Statistics of the Hebrew Bible is the counting of verses, words, and letters in the Bible which has been known since the days of the Talmud (around the 3rd century). Later in the Masora period (between the 5th and 10th centuries), counting words and letters was one of the basic acts that were done to create a uniform version of the Bible and to safeguard it from disruptions. In the Babylonian Talmud, it is said that the families of the dead "scribes" in the Bible were named after a male working in counting the letters and words in the Torah. In Judaism, some regard the practice of counting letters and words as a mitzvah and a virtue.

According to the current version, the Hebrew Bible has approximately 22,864 verses, 306,757 Hebrew words, and 1,202,972 Hebrew letters. Out of these, there are 5,845 verses, 79,980 Hebrew words, and 304,805 letters in five books of the Torah. Various statistics of the Hebrew Bible have been published in Jewish literature over the generations.
