= Damascus Pentateuch =

10th-century Hebrew Pentateuch manuscript

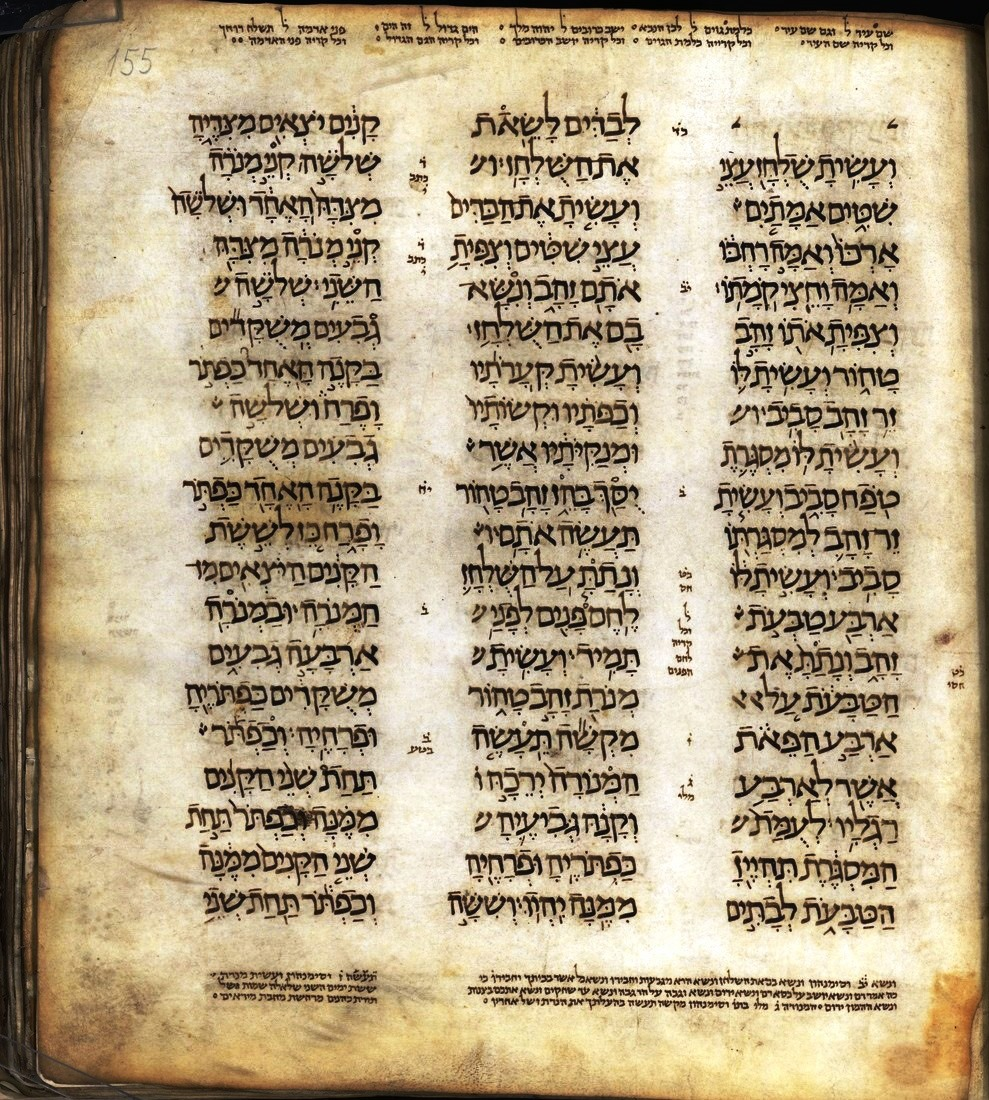
Page from Damascus Pentateuch, Exodus 25:23-35

The Damascus Pentateuch or Codex Sassoon 507 is a 10th-century Hebrew Bible codex, consisting of the almost complete Pentateuch, the Five Books of Moses. The codex was copied by an unknown scribe, replete with Masoretic annotations. The beginning of the manuscript is damaged: it starts with Genesis 9:26, and Exodus 18:1–23 is also missing. In 1975 it was acquired by the Jewish National and University Library, Jerusalem (from 2008 "National Library of Israel"). The codex was published in a large, two-volume facsimile edition in 1978.

It is distinct from the 13th-century Damascus Crown (Keter Damascus) of Spanish origin, a manuscript containing 24 canonical books. It is also distinct from the privately owned Codex Sassoon 1053.

== History ==
The Damascus Pentateuch came to renown owing largely to the works of the bibliophile, David Solomon Sassoon, who bought the codex in Damascus in the early 20th century. It is one of the oldest extant Bible codices, ranking along with the Aleppo Codex and Leningrad Codex. In many places, the Damascus Pentateuch follows the traditions of the masorete, Aaron ben Asher, in plene scriptum and defective scriptum, as well as in most large and small letters, being harmonious with the Masoretic variants prescribed by Ben-Asher up to 52% of the time. Like the Masoretic tradition of Ben Asher, the copyist of the Damascus Pentateuch also writes פצוע דכא in Deut. 23:2 with an aleph, and writes תעשה in Exo. 25:31 in defective scriptum, without a yod, as also the word האפד in Exo. 28:26 is written by him in defective scriptum, without a waw. Such practices are also common with Aaron Ben Asher.

The Codex is written on parchment, in three columns to the page, in large oriental square script typical of writing scripts used in the 9th century. Like other codices of its era, it bears micrography known as the Masora Magna (large Masora), that is, the preservation of the minutiæ of the text-tradition written as a gloss on the top and bottom of each page, as well as the Masora Parva (small Masora) written in between the columns. According to Sassoon, the writer of the Masora (critical notes of the Masoretic annotations) was a follower of Ben Asher, yet the Bible text (orthography and vocalization) follows that of Ben Naphtali and his school. As to the age of the Codex, Sassoon has posited that “the manuscript is probably older than the British Museum MS., No. Oriental 4445, which is supposed to have been written about 820–850 CE., of Babylonian origin. The text is furnished with Tiberian vowel points, accents, and the Rafeh strokes, e.g. the horizontal line written above the non-accentuated letters of בג״ד כפ״ת (Begadkefat), including the א in some cases, as on p. 54 in vol. 1 (on Genesis 32:28), ישראל. The smaller divisions for the weekly biblical lections, otherwise known as Sedarim, are marked throughout the codex by the writer of the Masora by a large samekh (ס) in the margin with the number of the Seder below.

The style of lettering follows an archaic style; the leg of the Hebrew character qof (ק) is joined to its roof, while the he (ה) is made like the ḥet (ח), with hardly any distinction between the two letters. The lamed (ל) is written exceptionally long, and hooked towards the outside. The final nun (ן) is written almost the same as the letter zayn.

All the qərē and kətiv are marked by the writer of the text with a final nun in the margin without any further direction as to what the reading should be.

A summary of the Damascus Pentateuch was made by Israel Yeivin, in connection with the problems of the Aleppo Codex. According to Yeivin, the textus receptus of the Damascus Pentateuch is mostly harmonious with the Leningrad Codex. As for the variants in vocalization it follows that of Ben Asher up to 52% of the time, and that of Ben Naphtali up to 46% of the time, for which diversity it has been called by him "a mixed manuscript where one can find in it a few 'improvements,' but which differs in several aspects regarding its vocalization and trope symbols from the Aleppo Codex."

A two-volume facsimile edition of the manuscript was printed in 1978–1982 in Baltimore, Maryland, United States, by Johns Hopkins University Press, and in Copenhagen, Denmark, by Rosenkilde and Bagger.

== See also ==
- List of Hebrew Bible manuscripts
  - Aleppo Codex
  - Leningrad Codex
  - Lailashi Codex
  - Codex Sassoon
  - Codex Orientales
  - Dead Sea Scrolls
- Parashah
- Torah scroll (Yemenite)
