= Codex Sassoon 1053 =

10th-century manuscript of the Hebrew bible

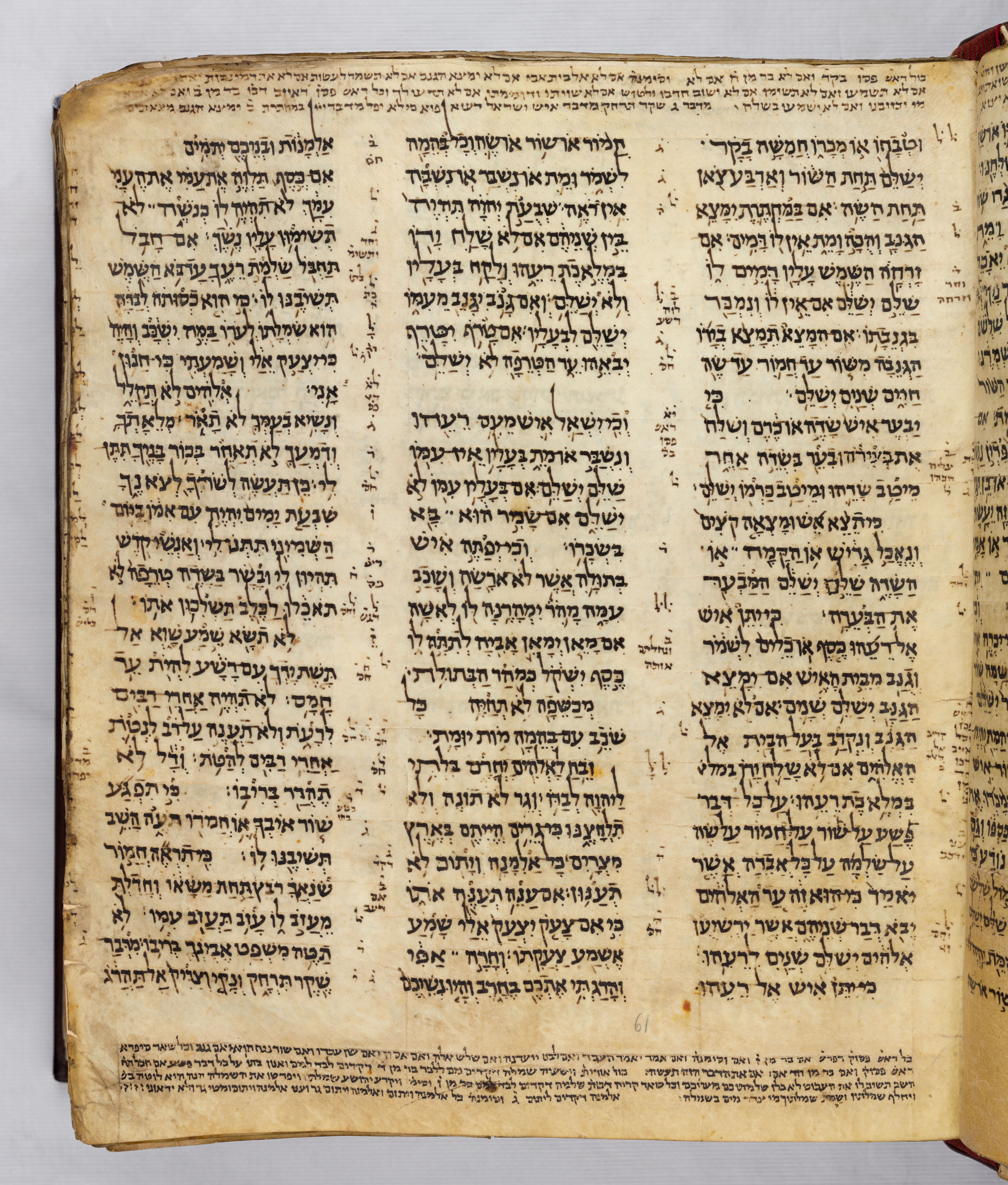
Exodus 21-23 (f. 61) in Codex S1 (Photography by Ardon Bar-Hama).

Codex S1 (or M^{S1}; formerly Codex Sassoon 1053 and also Safra, JUD 002) is an almost-complete Masoretic codex comprising almost all pages (12 are missing) of the 24 books of the Hebrew Bible, dated to the 10th century CE. It is considered as old as the Aleppo Codex and a century older than the Leningrad Codex (from 1008 CE), the earliest known complete Hebrew Bible manuscript. Alternatively, it might be dated to the late 9th century. The Aleppo Codex was missing 40% of its leaves when it resurfaced in Israel in 1958, while in Codex S1 only twelve leaves are completely missing and hundreds more are partially lost. The scribe of S1 was unusually sloppy, frequently forgetting punctuation, diacritical marks, and vowels; he also errs in his consonantal spelling on dozens of occasions.

Yosef Ofer has announced a forthcoming critical edition of S1's masora magna.

== Name ==
S1 is named after its previous owner David Solomon Sassoon (1880–1942). He also owned other important manuscripts, including the 10th century Damascus Pentateuch (Sassoon 507), which is now at the National Library of Israel in Jerusalem.

== Internal features ==
S1 is written with three columns to every page. The masora parva is complete, but the masora magna only appears on a few pages. Diacritical marks including the dot marking a shin or sin, the dagesh, the maqef, and the paseq are frequently missing. When a vowel is repeated on consecutive consonants, S1 often shows only the first. As a general rule, alephs receive an ordinary shva instead of a hataf vowel. In cases of disagreement, S1 agrees with the tradition of Ben Asher 40% of the time, with Ben Naphtali 20% of the time, and with neither 40% of the time. Ga'ya in an open syllable is marked less frequently that in the Aleppo Codex. The sof passuq is sometimes forgotten at the end of verses.

== History and provenance ==
S1 includes an incomplete masora magna (ad f. 452), apparently added by a later scribe, which refers to Aaron ben Moses ben Asher and the Aleppo Codex. It was carbon dated to the late 9th to early 10th century by its current owner, Jacqui Safra. It measures 12 by 14 inches (30 cm × 36 cm), with a simple 20th-century leather binding.

In the first centuries of its existence, the book switched hands throughout the Middle East, passed along from owner Khalaf ben Abraham to Isaac ben Ezekiel al-Attar, and then to his sons Ezekiel and Maimon. In the 13th century, it was dedicated to a synagogue in Makisin, now present day Markada (مَرْكَدَة), in Al-Hasakah Governorate, Syria. After destruction of the synagogue, either by the Mongols later in the 13th Century or by the Timurids at the start of the 15th Century, the codex was owned by Salama ibn Abi al-Fakhr as the synagogue awaited reconstruction, which never happened.

== Public re-emergence ==
Six hundred years later, the codex resurfaced when David Solomon Sassoon purchased it from an owner who lived in current day Ankara, Turkey, for £350 in 1929 and added his bookplate to the inner binding of the manuscript. Though known to scholars in the 20th century, the book stayed under private ownership. It was owned by D.S. Sassoon's descendants until 1978, when they sold it to the British Rail Pension Fund through Sotheby's Zurich. S1 was exhibited just once, in 1982 at the British Museum. The manuscript was auctioned again through Sotheby's on December 5, 1989, when it sold to a dealer for £2,035,000, who sold it to investor Jacqui Safra that same year.

It was sold at Sotheby's in New York in May 2023, for $38.1 million. The codex was on display prior to auction in London, ANU - Museum of the Jewish People in Tel Aviv, Bridwell Library at Southern Methodist University in Dallas, Los Angeles, and New York City. It was purchased by the American Friends of ANU — Museum of the Jewish People in Tel Aviv with the aid of a donation from Alfred H. Moses. This marks it as the third most expensive book and manuscript ever sold.

== See also ==
- List of Hebrew Bible manuscripts
  - Aleppo Codex
  - Leningrad Codex
  - Codex Cairensis
  - Codex Orientales
  - Damascus Pentateuch
  - Dead Sea Scrolls
