= Masorah =

Masorah or Mesorah (Hebrew: מסורה) refers either to the transmission of Jewish religious tradition, or to the tradition itself, and may refer to:

- The Hebrew vowel points also known as niqqud
- Masoretic Text, the authoritative text of the Tanakh for Rabbinic Judaism
- Masoretes, scribes who passed down the Masoretic text
- Masortim, meaning "traditional", semi-observant Jews in Israel
- Masorti Judaism, another name for Conservative Judaism
- Mesora, an alternative spelling for Metzora (parashah)
- Mesorah Publications Ltd., the publisher of ArtScroll
- Torah Umesorah – National Society for Hebrew Day Schools, a Haredi American educational network
- Masora River, a river in Mahanoro, Atsinanana, Madagascar
