= Naphtali ben David =

Hebrew author

Naphtali ben David of Amsterdam (Hebrew: נפתלי בן דוד מאמשטרדם; fl. early 18th century) was a Hebrew author.

He was born in Witzenhausen, Germany, and belonged to the family of Moses Isserles. Naphtali was a distinguished Talmudical scholar and enjoyed great fame as a Kabbalist. He published one book, Ben David (Amsterdam, 1729), strictures on the Kabbalistic work Omer Man by Menahem Lonzano.

== Publications ==
- Sefer Ben David. Amsterdam. 1729.
