= Abraham de Lonzano =

Abraham ben Raphael de Lonzano (Hebrew: אברהם בן רפאל די לונזאנו; fl. early 18th century) was an Austrian kabbalist, grammarian, and poet. He was apparently originally from the Greek island of Zakynthos, and a descendent of Rabbi Menahem de Lonzano. He later studied at the beth midrash Etz Ḥayyim in Amsterdam. De Lonzano's Hebrew grammar, Kinyan Avraham, was published in Zolkiev in 1723.

He afterwards converted to Christianity at Idstein and took the baptismal name Wilhelm Heinrich Neumann.
