= Codex Orientales 4445 =

10th-century Masoretic text

- The London Codex
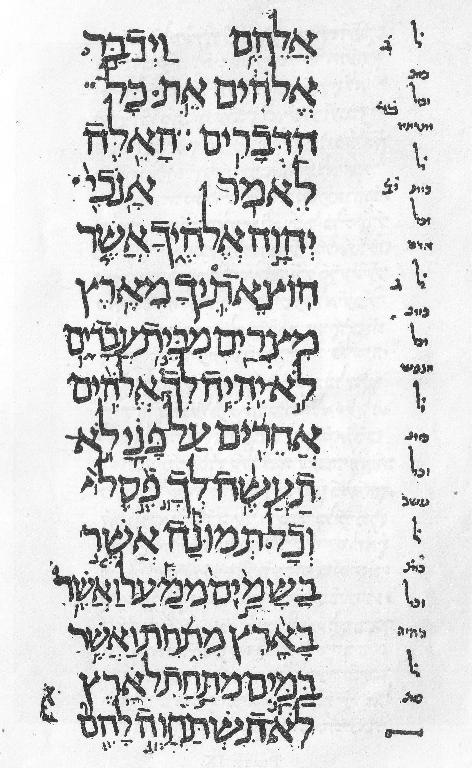
- Manuscript excerpt of Exodus 20:1-5 (The Ten Commandments)
- Created: 10th Century
- Place: Egypt or Palestine
- Present location: British Library
- Identification: Orientales 4445
- British Library's digital scan

The London Codex, or Codex Orientales 4445 is a Hebrew codex containing Masoretic text dating from the 9th or 10th century. The manuscript contains an incomplete copy of the Pentateuch. The manuscript is housed in the British Library.

== Contents ==
The oldest part of the codex contains text from Genesis 39:20 to Deuteronomy 1:3, with gaps and later additions. The manuscript contains 186 folios, 55 of which were later added to the codex. The added parts consist of folios 1-28, 125 (Numbers 7:46-73), 128 (Numbers 9:12-10:18), and folios 160-186 (Deuteronomy 1:4-34:12). The additions are dated to around 1540 AD, around 600 years after the creation of the original manuscript.

Many theorize that the codex was originally copied by Nissi ben Daniel in Egypt or then-Palestine, with the additions being of Yemenite origin. The British Library obtained the manuscript in 1891 through a private collector.

== Description ==
The text is supplemented with the Niqqud and cantillation marks, the latter of which are the first example of a Torah manuscript to contain a formal system for signifying ritual chanting. There are three columns of text on each page, and each column typically has twenty-one lines. The edge of the left side of the columns were not leveled with the dilation of ending letters used in certain Hebrew manuscripts.

The upper margin of each page contains two masora magna lines, and on the lower margin, there are four of them. The outer and inner-column margins contain the masora parva. Both marginal notations were added to the manuscript around a century after its original creation. The masora used is its oldest form, and differs from the terminology used in 11th and 12th century manuscripts. It was probably added in the time of the ben-Ashers.

The niqqud and cantillation trope are consistent with the Western-style Masorah called Palestinian, according to the textus receptus. According to Biblical scholar Christian Ginsburg, the authors of the manuscript began writing it sometime between 820 and 850 AD, finishing around 950 AD.

== See also ==
- List of Hebrew Bible manuscripts
  - Aleppo Codex
  - Leningrad Codex
  - Codex Sassoon
  - Damascus Pentateuch
  - Dead Sea Scrolls
