= Jedidiah Norzi =

Italian rabbi and biblical commentator

Jedidiah Solomon ben Abraham Norzi (1560–1626) (Hebrew: ידידיה נורצי, romanized: Yedidya Nortzi) was a Rabbi and exegete, best known for his work Minchat Shai.

Born at Mantua, he studied under Moses Cases, and received his rabbinical ordination in 1585. Toward the beginning of the 17th century he was elected co-rabbi of Mantua, a position which he held until his death.

== Masoretic Labors ==
The masoretic work Minhat Shai by Yedidyah Norzi. First edition (Mantua, 1742).

Jedidiah Solomon consecrated the greater part of his life to a critical and Masoretic commentary on the Bible, which was considered a standard work. The author spared no pains to render his critical labors as complete as possible, and to leave the Biblical text in as perfect a condition as thorough learning and conscientious industry could make it. He noted all the various readings which are scattered through Talmudic and midrashic literature and consulted all the Masoretic works, both published and unpublished.

To collate all the manuscripts to which he could gain access, and to find the Masoretic work Masoret Seyag la-Torah of Meir Abulafia, Jedidiah Solomon undertook extended voyages and lived for a long time abroad. Among the manuscripts consulted by him was that of Toledo of the year 1277 (now known as the Codex De Rossi, No. 782). He compared all the texts of the printed editions and availed himself of his friend Menahem Lonzano's critical labors in connection with biblical orthography. Lonzano's seminal work, Or Torah, was a primary source of inspiration for Norzi, from which he gleaned most of his knowledge of scribal practices and of Masoretic works unavailable to him.

The work was completed in 1626 and was entitled by its author Goder Peretz, but given the title Minḥat Shai when the work was first printed by its publisher, Raphael Ḥayyim Basila, more than 100 years later, who added to it some notes and appended a list of 900 variations (Mantua, 1742–44). It was divided into two volumes, the first embracing the Torah and the Five Megillot, and the second comprising the Ketuvim and the Nevi'im, with two small treatises at the end—Ma'amar haMa'arikh, on meteg in Hebrew cantillation, and Kelale BeGaDKaFaT on the begadkefat. A second edition, without the grammatical treatises, appeared at Vienna in 1816; the commentary on the Torah alone, with the Hebrew text, was published at Dubrovna in 1804; the commentary on the Hagiographa and the Prophets, at Wilna in 1820. Jedidiah Solomon's introduction was published by Samuel Vita della Volta in 1819, and republished by A. Jellinek at Vienna in 1876. A commentary on the Minḥat Shai was published by Ḥayyim Zeeb Bender of Babruysk under the title Or Ḥayyim (Wilna, 1867).

Norzi was greatly influenced by the Spanish biblical scholar, Meir Abulafia, who is cited by him more than six hundred times in Minḥat Shai.

=== MSS of Minḥat Shai ===
- MS Oxford, Bodleian Library (Oxford 1886), Mich. 562
  - idem, Mich. 478
- MS Kaufman A43 (Library of the Hungarian Academy of Sciences, Budapest, Hungary)
- MS Kaufman A44 (Library of the Hungarian Academy of Sciences, Budapest, Hungary)
- MS London, British Library, Add MS 27198
- MS Parma 895 (Codex Parm. 2872), the Palatina Library

== Secondary literature ==
- Betzer, Zvi. H. 2001. Further clarifications on the work of Norzi. Hebrew Studies 42:257-269.

== Bibliography ==
- Giovanni Bernardo De Rossi, Dizionario, p. 250;
- Eichhorn, Einleitung in das Alte Testament;
- Rosenmüller, Handbuch für die Literatur der Biblischen Exegesis;
- Steinschneider, Cat. Bodl. col. 2377;
- Fürst, Bibl. Jud. iii.39;
- Michael, Heimann Joseph, (1891) Or ha-Ḥayyim, Frankfort-on-the-Main (in Hebrew).p. 432, No. 951;
- Fuenn, Keneset Yisrael, p. 382.
