= Nakdanim =

Group of Jewish scholars

The nakdanim (Hebrew: נקדנים, romanized: naqdanim, lit. 'punctuators') were a group of Jewish scholars active between the 9th and 14th centuries, who added accents and vowels to biblical texts. They were the successors of the Masoretes. Their name is derived from the Hebrew term niqqud, which refers to the supplementary marks invented to indicate vowels and cantillation in the Hebrew Bible.

Naqdanim were responsible for all the pen drawings and micrographic decorations in Ashkenazi manuscripts. They were also involved in the writing of compilations and explanations of Masoretic works, the latter of which would often be included in the body of the texts.
