= Masoretic Text =

Authoritative text of the Tanakh in Rabbinic Judaism

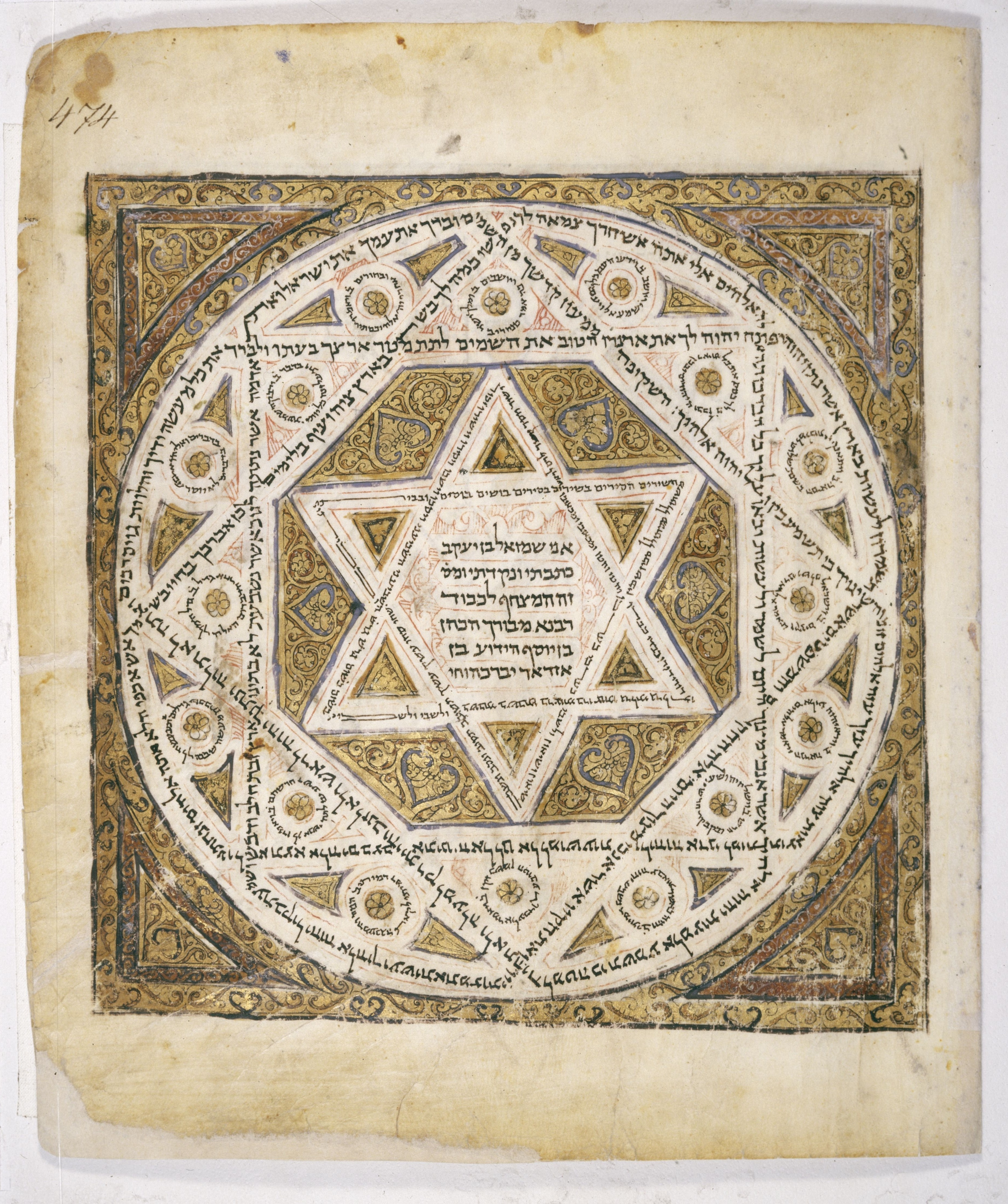
Carpet page from the Leningrad Codex, the oldest complete manuscript of the Masoretic Text

The Masoretic Text (Note: "Masoretic" pronounced /ˌmæsəˈrɛtɪk/.) (MT or 𝕸; Hebrew: נֻסָּח הַמָּסוֹרָה, romanized: Nussāḥ ham-Māsorā, lit. 'Text of the Tradition') is the authoritative Hebrew and Aramaic text of the 24 books of the Hebrew Bible (Tanakh) in Rabbinic Judaism. The Masoretic Text defines the Jewish canon and its precise letter-text, with its vocalization and accentuation known as the masora. Referring to the Masoretic Text, masora specifically means the diacritic markings of the text of the Jewish scriptures and the concise marginal notes in manuscripts (and later printings) of the Tanakh which note textual details, usually about the precise spelling of words. It was primarily copied, edited, and distributed by a group of Jews known as the Masoretes between the 7th and 10th centuries of the Common Era. The oldest known complete copy, the Leningrad Codex, dates to 1009 CE and is recognized as the most complete source of biblical books in the Ben Asher tradition. It has served as the base text for critical editions such as the Biblia Hebraica Stuttgartensia and Biblia Hebraica Leningradensia.

The differences attested to in the Dead Sea Scrolls indicate that multiple versions of the Hebrew scriptures already existed by the end of the Second Temple period. Which is closest to a theoretical Urtext is disputed, as is whether such a singular text ever existed. The Dead Sea Scrolls, dating to as early as the 3rd century BCE, contain versions of the text which have some differences with today's Hebrew Bible. The Septuagint (a compilation of Koine Greek translations made in the third and second centuries BCE) and the Peshitta (a Syriac translation made in the second century CE) occasionally present notable differences from the Masoretic Text, as does the Samaritan Pentateuch, the text of the Torah preserved by the Samaritans in Samaritan Hebrew. Fragments of an ancient 2nd–3rd-century manuscript of the Book of Leviticus found near an ancient synagogue's Torah ark in Ein Gedi have identical wording to the Masoretic Text.

The Masoretic Text is the basis for most Protestant translations of the Old Testament such as the King James Version, English Standard Version, New American Standard Bible, and New International Version. After 1943, it has also been used for some Catholic Bibles, such as the New American Bible and the New Jerusalem Bible. Some Christian denominations instead prefer translations of the Septuagint as it matches quotations in the New Testament.

== Origin and transmission ==
The inter-relationship between various significant ancient manuscripts of the Old Testament (some identified by their sigla). "Mt" here denotes the Masoretic Text; "LXX", the original Septuagint.

The oldest manuscript fragments of the final Masoretic Text, including vocalications and the masorah, date from around the 9th century. (Note: A 7th century fragment containing the "Song of the Sea" (Exodus 13:19–16:1) is one of the few surviving texts from the "silent era" of Hebrew biblical texts between the Dead Sea Scrolls and the Aleppo Codex.) The oldest-known complete copy, the Leningrad Codex, dates from the early 11th century. The Aleppo Codex, once the oldest-known complete copy but missing large sections since the 1947 anti-Jewish riots in Aleppo, dates from the 10th century. However, codification of the base consonants appears to have begun earlier, perhaps even in the Second Temple period.

=== Second Temple period ===
The discovery of the Dead Sea Scrolls at Qumran, dating from c. 150 BCE – 75 CE, shows that in this period there was no uniform text. According to Menachem Cohen, the Dead Sea scrolls showed that "there was indeed a Hebrew text-type on which the Septuagint-translation was based and which differed substantially from the received MT [Masoretic Text]." The scrolls show numerous small variations in orthography, both as against the later Masoretic Text, and between each other. It is also evident from the notings of corrections and of variant alternatives that scribes felt free to choose according to their personal taste and discretion between different readings.

The text of the Dead Sea Scrolls and Peshitta read somewhat in-between the Masoretic Text and the old Greek. However, despite these variations, most of the Qumran fragments can be classified as being closer to the Masoretic Text than to any other text group that has survived. According to Lawrence Schiffman, 60% can be classed as being of proto-Masoretic type, and a further 20% Qumran style with a basis in proto-Masoretic texts, compared to 5% proto-Samaritan type, 5% Septuagintal type, and 10% non-aligned. Joseph Fitzmyer noted the following regarding the findings at Qumran Cave 4 in particular: "Such ancient recensional forms of Old Testament books bear witness to an unsuspected textual diversity that once existed; these texts merit far greater study and attention than they have been accorded till now. Thus, the differences in the Septuagint are no longer considered the result of a poor or tendentious attempt to translate the Hebrew into the Greek; rather they testify to a different pre-Christian form of the Hebrew text". On the other hand, some of the fragments conforming most accurately to the Masoretic Text were found in Cave 4.

Tannaitic sources relate that a standard copy of the Hebrew Bible was kept in the court of the Second Temple for the benefit of copyists and that there were paid correctors of biblical books among the officers of the Temple. The Letter of Aristeas claims that a model codex was sent to Ptolemy by the High Priest Eleazar, who asked that it be returned after the Septuagint was completed. Josephus describes the Romans taking a copy of the Law as spoil, and both he and Philo claim no word of the text was ever changed from the time of Moses.

In contrast, an Amoraic narrative relates that three Torah scrolls were found in the Temple court, at variance with each other. The differences between the three were resolved by majority decision. This may describe a previous period, although Solomon Zeitlin argues it is not historical.

=== Rabbinic period ===
An emphasis on minute details of words and spellings, already used among the Pharisees as basis for argumentation, reached its height with the example of Rabbi Akiva (died 135 CE). The idea of a perfect text sanctified in its consonantal base quickly spread throughout the Jewish communities via supportive statements in Halakha, Aggadah, and Jewish thought; and with it increasingly forceful strictures that a deviation in even a single letter would make a Torah scroll invalid. Very few manuscripts are said to have survived the destruction of Jerusalem in 70 CE. This drastically reduced the number of variants in circulation and also gave a new urgency that the text must be preserved. Few manuscripts survive from this era, but a short Leviticus fragment recovered from the ancient En-Gedi Scroll, carbon-dated to the 3rd or 4th century CE, is completely identical to the consonantal Masoretic Text preserved today.

New Greek translations were also made. Unlike the Septuagint, large-scale deviations in sense between the Greek of Aquila of Sinope and Theodotion and what we now know as the Masoretic Text are minimal. Relatively small variations between different Hebrew texts in use still clearly existed though, as witnessed by differences between the present-day Masoretic Text and versions mentioned in the Gemara, and often even halachic midrashim based on spelling versions which do not exist in the current Masoretic Text.

=== The Age of the Masoretes ===
The current received text finally achieved predominance through the reputation of the Masoretes, schools of scribes and Torah scholars working between the 7th and 11th centuries in the Rashidun, Umayyad, and Abbasid Caliphates, based primarily in the cities of Tiberias and Jerusalem in Syria Palaestina and in Lower Mesopotamia (called "Babylonia"). According to Menachem Cohen, these schools developed such prestige for the accuracy and error control of their copying techniques that their texts established an authority beyond that of all others. Differences remained, sometimes bolstered by systematic local differences in pronunciation and cantillation. Every locality, following the tradition of its school, had a standard codex embodying its readings. In the talmudic academies in Babylonia, the school of Sura differed from that of Nehardea. Similar differences existed in those of Syria Palaestina, such as the one at Tiberias, which in later times increasingly became the chief seat of learning. During this period, the living tradition ceased, and the Masoretes, in preparing their codices, usually followed one school or the other, while examining the standard codices of other schools and noting their differences.

==== Ben Asher and Ben Naphtali ====
The Masorah for the most part ended in the 10th century with Aaron ben Moses ben Asher and Ben Naphtali, who were the leading Masoretes of the time. Ben Asher wrote a standard codex (the Aleppo Codex) embodying his opinions. Ben Naphtali likely did as well, though it has not survived. However, the differences between the two are found in more or less complete Masoretic lists and in quotations in David Ḳimḥi, Norzi, and other medieval writers.

The differences between Ben Naphtali and Ben Asher number approximately 875, nine-tenths of which pertain to the placement of accents, while the rest concern vowels and consonantal spelling. The differences between the two Masoretes do not represent solely personal opinions; the two rivals represent different schools. Like the Ben Ashers there seem to have been several Ben Naftalis. The Masoretic lists often do not agree on the precise nature of the differences between the two rival authorities; it is, therefore, impossible to define with exactness their differences in every case; and it is probably due to this fact that the received text does not follow uniformly the system of either Ben Asher or Ben Naphtali.

Ben Asher was the last of a distinguished family of Masoretes extending back to the latter half of the 8th century. Despite the rivalry of ben Naphtali and the opposition of Saadia Gaon, the most eminent representative of the Babylonian school of criticism, ben Asher's codex became recognized as the standard text of the Hebrew Bible. Notwithstanding all this, for reasons unknown neither the printed text nor any manuscript which has been preserved is based entirely on Ben Asher: they are all eclectic. Aside from Ben Asher and Ben Naphtali, the names of several other Masorites have come down; but, perhaps except for one—Pinehas, the head of the academy, who is supposed by modern scholars to have lived about 750—neither their time, their place, nor their connection with the various schools is known.

Most scholars conclude Aaron ben Asher was a Karaite rather than a Rabbanite. There is evidence to support the contrary view.

=== The Middle Ages ===
The two rival authorities, ben Asher and ben Naphtali, practically brought the Masorah to a close. Very few additions were made by the later Masoretes, styled in the 13th and 14th centuries Naqdanim, who revised the works of the copyists, added the vowels and accents (generally in fainter ink and with a finer pen) and frequently the Masorah.

During the 11th, 12th, and 13th centuries the Franco-German school of Tosafists influenced in the development and spread of Masoretic literature. Gershom ben Judah, his brother Machir ben Judah, Joseph ben Samuel Bonfils (Tob 'Elem) of Limoges, Rabbeinu Tam (Jacob ben Meïr), Menahem ben Perez of Joigny, Perez ben Elijah of Corbeil, Judah ben Isaac Messer Leon, Meïr Spira, and Meir of Rothenburg made Masoretic compilations, or additions to the subject, which are all more or less frequently referred to in the marginal glosses of biblical codices and in the works of Hebrew grammarians.

== Masorah ==
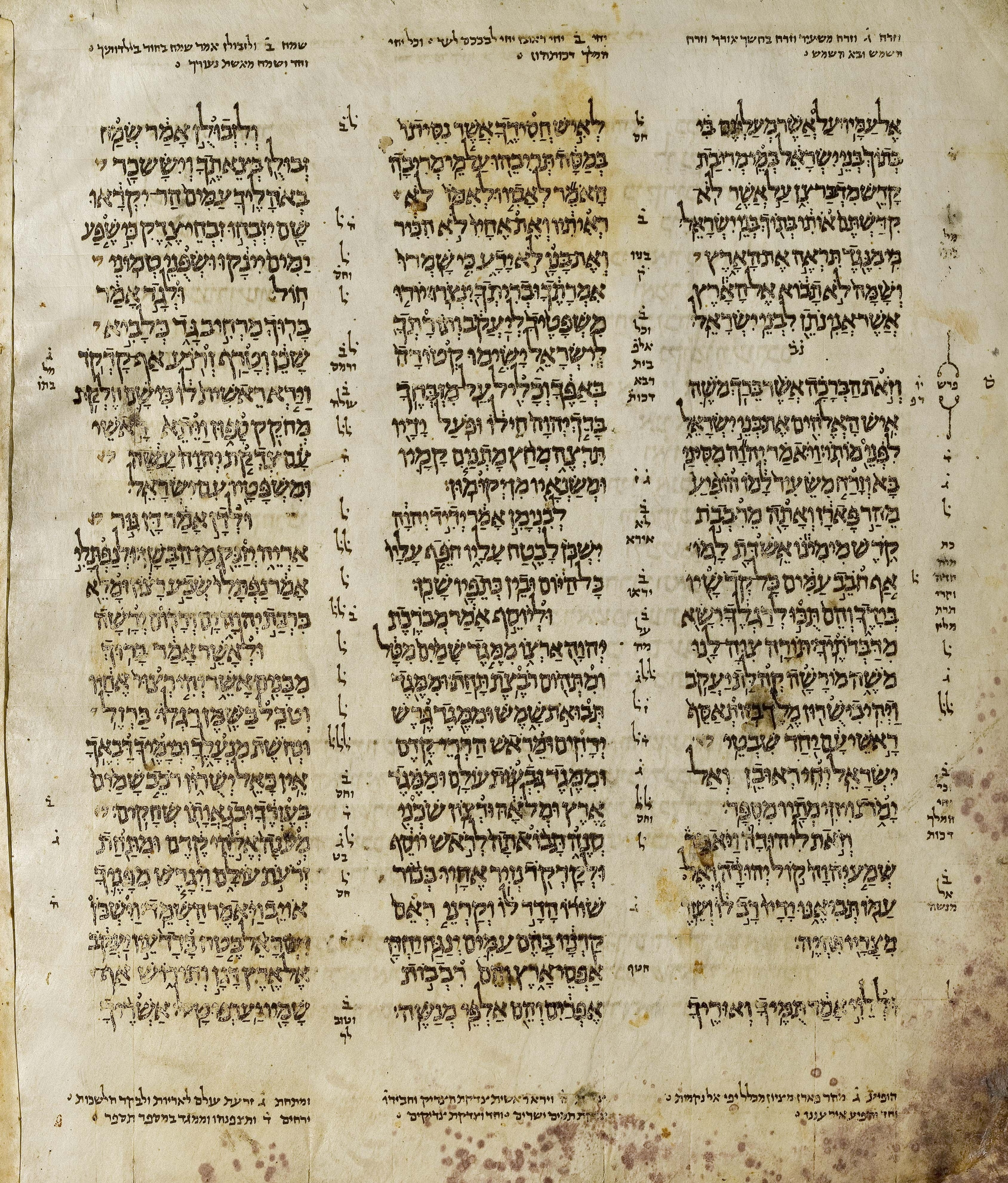
A page from the Aleppo Codex, showing the extensive marginal annotations

Traditionally, a ritual Sefer Torah (Torah scroll) could contain only the Hebrew consonantal text – nothing added, nothing taken away. The Masoretic codices, however, provide extensive additional material, called masorah, to show correct pronunciation and cantillation, protect against scribal errors, and annotate possible variants. The manuscripts thus include vowel points, pronunciation marks and stress accents in the text, short annotations in the side margins, and longer more extensive notes in the upper and lower margins and collected at the end of each book.

These notes were added because the Masoretes recognized the possibility of human error in copying the Hebrew Bible. The Masoretes were not working with the original Hebrew manuscripts of the Bible and corruptions had already crept into the versions they copied.

=== Etymology ===
From the Hebrew word masorah (Note: Vocalization uncertain, also: moseirah, mesorah, mesarah, misrah, masarah.) "tradition". Originally masoret, (Note: Also: moseret.) a word found in Book of Ezekiel 20:37 (there from אסר "to bind" for "fetters").

According to the majority of scholars, including Wilhelm Bacher, the form of the Ezekiel word masoret "fetters" was applied by the Masoretes to the מסר root meaning "to transmit", for masoret "tradition." (See also Aggadah § Etymology.) Later, the text was also called moseirah, by a direct conjugation of מסר "to transmit," and the synthesis of the two forms produced the modern word masorah.

According to a minority of scholars, including Caspar Levias, the intent of the Masoretes was masoret "fetter [upon the exposition of the text]", and the word was only later connected to מסר and translated as "tradition".

Other specific explanations are provided: Samuel David Luzzatto argued that masoret was a synonym for siman by extended meaning ("transmission[ of the sign]" became "transmitted sign") and referred to the symbols used in vocalizing and punctuating the text. Ze'ev Ben-Haim argued that masoret meant "counting" and was later conjugated as moseirah "thing which is counted", referring to the Masoretic counts of the letters, words, and verses in the Bible, discussed in Qiddushin 30a.

=== Language and form ===
The language of the Masoretic notes is primarily Aramaic but partly Hebrew. The Masoretic annotations are found in various forms: (a) in separate works, e.g., the Oklah we-Oklah; (b) in the form of notes written in the margins and at the end of codices. In rare cases, the notes are written between the lines. The first word of each biblical book is also as a rule surrounded by notes. The latter are called the Initial Masorah; the notes on the side margins or between the columns are called the Small (Masora parva or Mp) or Inner Masorah (Masora marginalis); and those on the lower and upper margins, the Large or Outer Masorah (Masora magna or Mm[Mas.M]). The name "Large Masorah" is applied sometimes to the lexically arranged notes at the end of the printed Bible, usually called the Final Masorah, (Masora finalis), or the Masoretic Concordance.

The Small Masorah consists of brief notes with reference to marginal readings, to statistics showing the number of times a particular form is found in Scripture, to full and defective spelling, and to abnormally written letters. The Large Masorah is more copious in its notes. The Final Masorah comprises all the longer rubrics for which space could not be found in the margin of the text, and is arranged alphabetically in the form of a concordance. The quantity of notes the marginal Masorah contains is conditioned by the amount of vacant space on each page. In the manuscripts it varies also with the rate at which the copyist was paid and the fanciful shape he gave to his gloss.

There was accordingly an independent Babylonian Masora which differed from the Palestinian in terminology and to some extent in order. The Masora is concise in style with a profusion of abbreviations, requiring a considerable amount of knowledge for their full understanding. It was quite natural that a later generation of scribes would no longer understand the notes of the Masoretes and consider them unimportant; by the late medieval period they were reduced to mere ornamentation of the manuscripts. It was Jacob ben Chayyim who restored clarity and order to them.

In most manuscripts, there are some discrepancies between the text and the masorah, suggesting that they were copied from different sources or that one of them has copying errors. The lack of such discrepancies in the Aleppo Codex is one of the reasons for its importance; the scribe who copied the notes, presumably Aaron ben Moses ben Asher, probably wrote them originally.

=== Numerical Masorah ===
In classical antiquity, copyists were paid for their work according to the number of stichs (lines of verse). As the prose books of the Bible were hardly ever written in stichs, the copyists, in order to estimate the amount of work, had to count the letters. According to some this was (also) to ensure accuracy in the transmission of the text with the production of subsequent copies that were done by hand.

Hence the Masoretes contributed the Numerical Masorah. These notes are traditionally categorized into two main groups, the marginal Masorah and the final Masorah. The category of marginal Masorah is further divided into the Masorah parva (small Masorah) in the outer side margins and the Masorah magna (large Masorah), traditionally located at the top and bottom margins of the text. The Masorah parva is a set of statistics in the outer side margins of the text. Beyond simply counting the letters, the Masorah parva consists of word-use statistics, similar documentation for expressions or certain phraseology, observations on full or defective writing, references to the Kethiv-Qere readings and more. These observations are also the result of a passionate zeal to safeguard the accurate transmission of the sacred text.

Even though often cited as very exact, the Masoretic "frequency notes" in the margin of Codex Leningradiensis contain several errors. (Note: See also the whole book "The Sub Loco notes in the Torah of Biblia Hebraica Stuttgartensia" by Daniel S. Mynatt, which describes about 150 frequency errors found in the Torah alone.)

The Masorah magna, in measure, is an expanded Masorah parva. Biblia Hebraica Stuttgartensia (BHS) includes an apparatus referring the reader to the large Masorah, which is printed separately.

The final Masorah is located at the end of biblical books or after certain sections of the text, such as at the end of the Torah. It contains information and statistics regarding the number of words in a book or section, etc. Thus, Book of Leviticus 8:23 is the middle verse in the Pentateuch. The collation of manuscripts and the noting of their differences furnished material for the Text-Critical Masorah. The close relation which existed in earlier times (from the Soferim to the Amoraim inclusive) between the teacher of tradition and the Masorete, both frequently being united in one person, accounts for the Exegetical Masorah. Finally, the invention and introduction of a graphic system of vocalization and accentuation gave rise to the Grammatical Masorah.

The most important of the Masoretic notes are those that detail the Qere and Ketiv that are located in the Masorah parva in the outside margins of BHS. Given that the Masoretes would not alter the sacred consonantal text, the Kethiv-Qere notes were a way of "correcting" or commenting on the text for any number of reasons (grammatical, theological, aesthetic, etc.) deemed important by the copyist.

== Fixing of the text ==
The earliest tasks of the Masoretes included a standard division of the text into books, sections, paragraphs, verses, and clauses; fixing of the orthography, pronunciation, and cantillation; introduction or final adoption of the square characters with the five final letters; some textual changes to guard against blasphemy (though these changes may pre-date the Masoretes – see Tikkune Soferim below); enumeration of letters, words, verses, etc., and the substitution of some words for others in public reading.

Since no additions were allowed to be made to the official text of the Bible, the early Masoretes adopted other methods: e.g., they marked the various divisions by spacing, and gave indications of halakic and haggadic teachings by full or defective spelling, abnormal forms of letters, dots, and other signs. Marginal notes were permitted only in private copies, and the first mention of such notes is found in the case of R. Meïr (c. 100–150 CE).

=== Scribal emendations – Tikkune Soferim ===
Early rabbinic sources, from around 200 CE, mention several passages of Scripture in which the conclusion is inevitable that the ancient reading must have differed from that of the present text. The explanation of this phenomenon is given in the expression "Scripture has used euphemistic language" (כנה הכתוב), i.e. to avoid anthropomorphism and anthropopathism.

Rabbi Simon ben Pazzi (3rd century) calls these readings "emendations of the Scribes" (tikkune Soferim; Midrash Genesis Rabbah xlix. 7), assuming that the Scribes actually made the changes. This view was adopted by the later Midrash and by the majority of Masoretes. In Masoretic works these changes are ascribed to Ezra; to Ezra and Nehemiah; to Ezra and the Soferim; or to Ezra, Nehemiah, Zechariah, Haggai, and Baruch. All these ascriptions mean one and the same thing: that the changes were assumed to have been made by the Men of the Great Assembly.

The term tikkun Soferim (תקון סופרים) has been understood by different scholars in various ways. Some regard it as a correction of biblical language authorized by the Soferim for homiletical purposes. Others take it to mean a mental change made by the original writers or redactors of Scripture; i.e. the latter shrank from putting in writing a thought which some of the readers might expect them to express.

The assumed emendations are of four general types:

- Removal of unseemly expressions used in reference to God; e.g., the substitution of ("to bless") for ("to curse") in certain passages.
- Safeguarding of the Tetragrammaton; e.g. substitution of "Elohim" or "Adonai" for "YHWH" in some passages.
- Removal of application of the names of pagan gods, e.g. the change of the name "Ishbaal" to "Ish-bosheth".
- Safeguarding the unity of divine worship at Jerusalem.

=== Mikra and ittur ===
Among the earliest technical terms used in connection with activities of the Scribes are the mikra Soferim and ittur Soferim. In the geonic schools, the first term was taken to signify certain vowel-changes which were made in words in pause or after the article; the second, the cancellation in a few passages of the "vav" conjunctive, where it had been wrongly read by some. The objection to such an explanation is that the first changes would fall under the general head of fixation of pronunciation, and the second under the head of Qere and Ketiv (i.e. "What is read" and "What is written"). Various explanations have, therefore, been offered by ancient as well as modern scholars without, however, succeeding in furnishing a completely satisfactory solution.

=== Suspended letters and dotted words ===
There are four words having one of their letters suspended above the line. One of them, מ^{נ}שה, is due to an alteration of the original משה out of reverence for Moses; rather than say that Moses's grandson became an idolatrous priest, a suspended letter nun ( נ ) was inserted to turn Mosheh into Menasheh (Manasseh). The origin of the other three is doubtful. According to some, they are due to mistaken majuscular letters; according to others, they are later insertions of originally omitted weak consonants.

In fifteen passages within the Bible, some words are stigmatized; i.e., dots appear above the letters. The significance of the dots is disputed. Some hold them to be marks of erasure; others believe them to indicate that in some collated manuscripts the stigmatized words were missing, hence that the reading is doubtful; still others contend that they are merely a mnemonic device to indicate homiletic explanations which the ancients had connected with those words; finally, some maintain that the dots were designed to guard against the omission by copyists of text-elements which, at first glance or after comparison with parallel passages, seemed to be superfluous. Instead of dots some manuscripts exhibit strokes, vertical or else horizontal. The first two explanations are unacceptable for the reason that such faulty readings would belong to Qere and Ketiv, which, in case of doubt, the majority of manuscripts would decide. The last two theories have equal probability.

=== Inverted letters ===
In nine passages of the Masoretic Text are found signs usually called inverted nuns, because they resemble the Hebrew letter nun ( נ ) written in some inverted fashion. The exact shape varies between different manuscripts and printed editions. In many manuscripts, a reversed nun is found referred to as a nun hafucha by the masoretes. In some earlier printed editions, they are shown as the standard nun upside down or rotated, because the printer did not want to bother to design a character to be used only nine times. The recent scholarly editions of the Masoretic Text show the reversed nun as described by the masoretes. In some manuscripts, however, other symbols are occasionally found instead. These are sometimes referred to in rabbinical literature as simaniyot (markers).

The primary set of inverted nuns is found surrounding the text of Numbers 10:35–36. The Mishna notes that this text is 85 letters long and dotted. This demarcation of this text leads to the later use of the inverted nun markings. Saul Lieberman demonstrated that similar markings can be found in ancient Greek texts where they are also used to denote 'short texts'. During the Medieval period, the inverted nuns were actually inserted into the text of the early Rabbinic Bibles published by Bomberg in the early 16th century. The talmud records that the markings surrounding Numbers 10:35-36 were thought to denote that this 85 letter text was not in its proper place.

Bar Kappara considered the Torah known to us as composed of seven volumes in the Gemara "The seven pillars with which Wisdom built her house (Prov. 9:1) are the seven Books of Moses". Genesis, Exodus and Leviticus and Deuteronomy as we know them but Numbers was really three separate volumes: Numbers 1:1–10:35 followed by Numbers 10:35–36 and the third text from there to the end of Numbers.

The 85 letter text is also said to be denoted because it is the model for the fewest letters which constitute a 'text' which one would be required to save from fire due to its holiness.

== History of the Masorah ==
The history of the Masorah may be divided into three periods: (1) creative period, from its beginning to the introduction of vowel-signs; (2) reproductive period, from the introduction of vowel-signs to the printing of the Masorah (1525); (3) critical period, from 1525 to the present time.

=== Creative Period ===
The creative period, from around the 6th century to the 10th century CE, marks the period of "creation" of the vowel system in the Masoretic texts. This was performed by the Tiberians, specifically by Masorete Scribes, with two schools (that being the ben Asher and Ben Naftali family). This vowel system also reflects a much earlier tradition used in the second temple period.

The materials for the history of the first period are scattered remarks in Talmudic and Midrashic literature, in the post-Talmudical treatises Masseket Sefer Torah and Masseket Soferim, and in a Masoretic chain of tradition found in ben Asher's Diḳduḳe ha-Ṭe'amim, § 69 and elsewhere.

== Critical study ==
Jacob ben Hayyim ibn Adonijah, having collated a vast number of manuscripts, systematized his material and arranged the Masorah in the second Bomberg edition of the Bible (Venice, 1524–1525). Besides introducing the Masorah into the margin, he compiled at the close of his Bible a concordance of the Masoretic glosses for which he could not find room in a marginal form, and added an elaborate introduction – the first treatise on the Masorah ever produced. Due to its wide distribution, and in spite of its many errors, this work is frequently considered as the textus receptus of the Masorah. It was also used for the English translation of the Old Testament for the King James Version (though not always followed).

Next to Ibn Adoniyah, the critical study of the Masorah has been most advanced by Elia Levita, who published his famous "Massoret ha-Massoret" in 1538. The Tiberias of the elder Johannes Buxtorf (1620) made Levita's researches more accessible to a Christian audience. The eighth introduction to Walton's Polyglot Bible is largely a reworking of the Tiberias. Levita compiled likewise a vast Masoretic concordance, Sefer ha-Zikronot, which still lies in the National Library at Paris unpublished. The study is indebted also to R. Meïr b. Todros ha-Levi (RaMaH), who, as early as the 13th century, wrote his Sefer Massoret Seyag la-Torah (correct ed. Florence, 1750); to Menahem Lonzano, who composed a treatise on the Masorah of the Pentateuch entitled "Or Torah"; and in particular to Jedidiah Norzi, whose "Minḥat Shai" contains valuable Masoretic notes based on a careful study of manuscripts.

The Dead Sea Scrolls have shed new light on the history of the Masoretic Text. Many texts found there, especially those from Masada, are quite similar to the Masoretic Text, suggesting that an ancestor of the Masoretic Text was indeed extant as early as the 2nd century BCE. However, other texts, including many of those from Qumran, differ substantially, indicating that the Masoretic Text was but one of a diverse set of biblical writings.

In a recent finding, a scroll fragment was found to be identical to the Masoretic Text. The approximately 1,700-year-old En-Gedi Scroll was found in 1970 but had not had its contents reconstructed until 2016. Researchers were able to recover 35 complete and partial lines of text from the Book of Leviticus and the text they deciphered is completely identical with the consonantal framework of the Masoretic Text. The En-Gedi scroll is the first biblical scroll to have been discovered in the holy ark of an ancient synagogue, where it would have been stored for prayers, and not in desert caves like the Dead Sea Scrolls.

== Some important editions ==
There have been very many published editions of the Masoretic Text, some of the most important being:

- Daniel Bomberg, ed. Jacob ben Hayyim ibn Adonijah, 1524–1525, Venice

The second Rabbinic Bible served as the base for all future editions. This was the source text used by the translators of the King James Version in 1611, the New King James Version in 1982, and the New Cambridge Paragraph Bible in 2005.

- Everard van der Hooght, 1705, Amsterdam and Utrecht

This was practically a reprint of the Athias-Leusden edition of 1667; but at the end it has variants taken from a number of printed editions. It has been much prized because of its excellent and clear type; but no manuscripts were used in its preparation. Nearly all 18th and 19th century Hebrew Bibles were almost exact reprints of this edition.

- Benjamin Kennicott, 1776, Oxford

As well as the van der Hooght text, this included the Samaritan Pentateuch and a huge collection of variants from manuscripts and early printed editions; while this collection has many errors, it is still of some value. The collection of variants was corrected and extended by Giovanni Bernardo De Rossi (1784–1788), but his publications gave only the variants without a complete text.

- Wolf Heidenheim, 1818, Frankfurt-am-Main

This edition (called Me'or Enayim) included the Five Books of Moses, Haftarot, and Megillot. It had many differences from earlier editions in vowels, notes and lay-out, based on a comparison with old manuscripts and a correction of misprints based on analysis of grammatical principles. There were extensive textual notes justifying all these alterations. Heidenheim also divided each weekly Sabbath reading into seven sections (seven people should be called up each Sabbath), as there had been considerable variation in practice about where to make the divisions, and his divisions are now accepted by nearly all Ashkenazi communities. Samson Raphael Hirsch used this text (omitting the textual notes) in his own commentary, and it became the standard text in Germany. It was frequently reprinted there, again without the textual notes, up to World War II, and the edition of Jack Mazin (London, 1950) is an exact copy.

- Max Letteris, 1852; 2nd edition, 1866 (published British and Foreign Bible Society)

The 1852 edition was yet another copy of van der Hooght. The 1866 edition, however, was carefully checked against old manuscripts and early printed editions, and has a very legible typeface. It is probably the most widely reproduced text of the Hebrew Bible in history, with many dozens of authorised reprints and many more pirated and unacknowledged ones.

- Seligman Baer and Franz Delitzsch, 1869–1895

Incomplete publication: Exodus to Deuteronomy never appeared.

- Christian David Ginsburg, 1894; 2nd edition, 1908–1926

The first edition was very close to the second Bomberg edition, but with variants added from a number of manuscripts and all of the earliest printed editions, collated with far more care than the work of Kennicott; he did all the work himself. The second edition diverged slightly more from Bomberg, and collated more manuscripts; he did most of the work himself, but failing health forced him to rely partly on his wife and other assistants.

- Biblia Hebraica, first two editions, 1906, 1912

Virtually identical to the second Bomberg edition, but with variants from Hebrew sources and early translations in the footnotes

- Biblia Hebraica

Third edition based on the Leningrad Codex, 1937; later reprints listed some variant readings from the Dead Sea Scrolls.

- Umberto Cassuto, 1953

Based on Ginsburg 2nd edition, but revised based on the Aleppo Codex, Leningrad Codex, and other early manuscripts.

- Norman Snaith, 1958 (published British and Foreign Bible Society)

Snaith based it on Sephardi manuscripts such as British Museum Or. 2626-2628, and said that he had not relied on Letteris. However, it has been shown that he must have prepared his copy by amending a copy of Letteris, because while there are many differences, it has many of the same typographical errors as Letteris. Snaith's printer even went so far as to break printed vowels to match some accidentally broken characters in Letteris. Snaith combined the accent system of Letteris with the system found in Sephardi manuscripts, thereby creating accentuation patterns found nowhere else in any manuscript or printed edition.

- Hebrew University Bible Project, 1965–

Started by Moshe Goshen-Gottstein, this follows the text of the Aleppo Codex where extant and otherwise the Leningrad Codex. It includes a wide variety of variants from the Dead Sea Scrolls, Septuagint, early Rabbinic literature and selected early medieval manuscripts. So far, only Isaiah, Jeremiah, and Ezekiel have been published.

- The Koren Bible by Koren Publishers Jerusalem, 1962

The text was derived by comparing a number of printed Bibles, and following the majority when there were discrepancies. It was criticised by Moshe Goshen-Gottstein: "the publisher of the Koren Bible – who laid no claim to expertise in masoretic issues ... sought the help of three scholars, all of whom suffered from the same lack of Masoretic expertise ... Basically, the Koren edition is hardly an edition like that of Dotan, but another rehash of the material prepared by ben Hayim."

- Aron Dotan, based on the Leningrad Codex but correcting obvious errors, 1976
- Biblia Hebraica Stuttgartensia

Revision of Biblia Hebraica (third edition), 1977. The second edition of Stuttgartensia (published 1983) was the source text for the Old Testament portion of the English Standard Version, published in 2001.

- Mordechai Breuer

Based on the Aleppo Codex, 1977–1982

- The Jerusalem Crown, 2001

This is a revised version of Breuer, and is the official version used in inaugurating the President of Israel.

- Biblia Hebraica Quinta

Revision of Biblia Hebraica Stuttgartensia; fascicles published as of 2024 are: Genesis, Leviticus, Deuteronomy, Judges, the Twelve Minor Prophets, Job, Proverbs, Ruth, Song of Songs, Ecclesiastes, Lamentations, Esther, Ezra and Nehemiah.

== See also ==
- Composition of the Torah
- Masorah
- Micrography
- Parashah
- List of Hebrew Bible manuscripts
  - Aleppo Codex
  - Leningrad Codex
  - Codex Sassoon
  - Codex Cairensis
  - Codex Orientales
  - Damascus Pentateuch
  - Dead Sea Scrolls
