= Ernest John Revell =

Scottish scholar (1934–2017)

- Born: 15 April 1934; Bengaluru
- Died: 15 December 2017 (aged 83); Antigonish
- Occupation: Hebraist
- Position held: emeritus

Ernest John Revell (15 April 1934 – 15 December 2017) was a Scottish scholar, professor emeritus and chair of the Department of Near and Middle Eastern Civilization at the University of Toronto, and expert in the field of Biblical Hebrew. He remained active, publishing until 2016.

== Life ==
Revell was a watercolorist and a botanical artist.

=== Education ===
In 1962, Revell earned his PhD at the University of Toronto, with his thesis A structural analysis of the grammar of the Manual of discipline (1QS).

=== Teaching ===
He served the University of Toronto as a professor, chair and professor emeritus in the Department of Near Eastern Studies which later became the Department of Near and Middle Eastern Civilizations. Revell was a member of Society of Biblical Literature.

== Bibliography ==
=== Thesis ===
- E. J. Revell (1962). A structural analysis of the grammar of the Manual of discipline (1QS) (PhD Dissertation. University of Toronto). OCLC 223312355.

=== Books ===
- E. J. Revell (1970). Hebrew texts with Palestinian vocalization. Near and Middle East series. Vol. 7. [Toronto] University of Toronto Press. ISBN 9780802052155. OCLC 103333.
- E. J. Revell (1977). Biblical texts with Palestinian pointing and their accents. Masoretic studies. Vol. 4. Missoula, Mont.: Published by Scholars Press for the Society of Biblical Literature. ISBN 9780891303749. OCLC 5750606.
- E. J. Revell; Israel Yeivin (1980). Introduction to the Tiberian Masorah. Masoretic studies. Vol. 5. Missoula, Mont. : Published by Scholars Press for the Society of Biblical Literature and the International Organization for Masoretic Studies. ISBN 9780891303749. OCLC 5750606.
- Mary Alice Downie; Mary Hamilton; E J Revell; Antje Lingner (1980). "And some brought flowers" : plants in a new world. Toronto; Buffalo : University of Toronto Press. ISBN 9780802023636. OCLC 7020602.
- E. J. Revell (1996). The Designation of the Individual: Expressive Usage in Biblical Narrative. Contributions to biblical exegesis and theology, ISSN 0926-6097. Vol. 14. Peeters Publishers. ISBN 9789039001615.

=== Articles ===
- Revell, E. J. (1980). "Pausal Forms in Biblical Hebrew: Their Function, Origin and Significance". Journal of Semitic Studies. 25 (2): 165–179. doi:10.1093/jss/25.2.165.
- E.J. Revell (1981-01-01). "Pausal Forms and the Structure of Biblical Poetry". Vetus Testamentum. 31 (2). Brill: 186–199. doi:10.1163/156853381X00073.
- Revell, E. J. (1984). "Stress and the WAW "Consecutive" in Biblical Hebrew". Journal of the American Oriental Society. 104 (3): 437–444. doi:10.2307/601654. JSTOR 601654.
- Revell, E. J. (1989). "The System of the Verb in Standard Biblical Prose". Hebrew Union College Annual. 60: 1–37. JSTOR 23507837.
- Revell, E. J. (1993). "Language and Interpretation in 1 Kings 20". In The Frank Talmage Memorial Volume, v. 1, ed. Barry Walfish, 103-114. Haifa University Press. ISBN 9789653110144.
- Revell, E. J. (1997). "The Repetition of Introductions to Speech as a Feature of Biblical Hebrew". Vetus Testamentum. 47 (1): 91–110. doi:10.1163/1568533972652035. JSTOR 1535310.
