= Menahem Lonzano =

Rabbi, Masoretic scholar, lexicographer, and poet

Menahem ben Judah ben Menahem de Lonzano
- מנחם די לונזאנו

Personal life
- Born: Italy (probable)
- Died: after 1608 Jerusalem, Ottoman Empire
- Notable work(s): Shetei Yadot, Or Torah, Ma'arikh
- Other name: Menahem di Lonzano
- Occupation: Rabbi, Masoretic scholar, lexicographer, poet

Religious life
- Religion: Judaism

Menahem ben Judah ben Menahem de Lonzano (Hebrew: מנחם די לונזאנו), often Menahem di Lonzano, was a rabbi, Masoretic scholar, lexicographer, and poet. He died after 1608 in Jerusalem.

== Biography ==
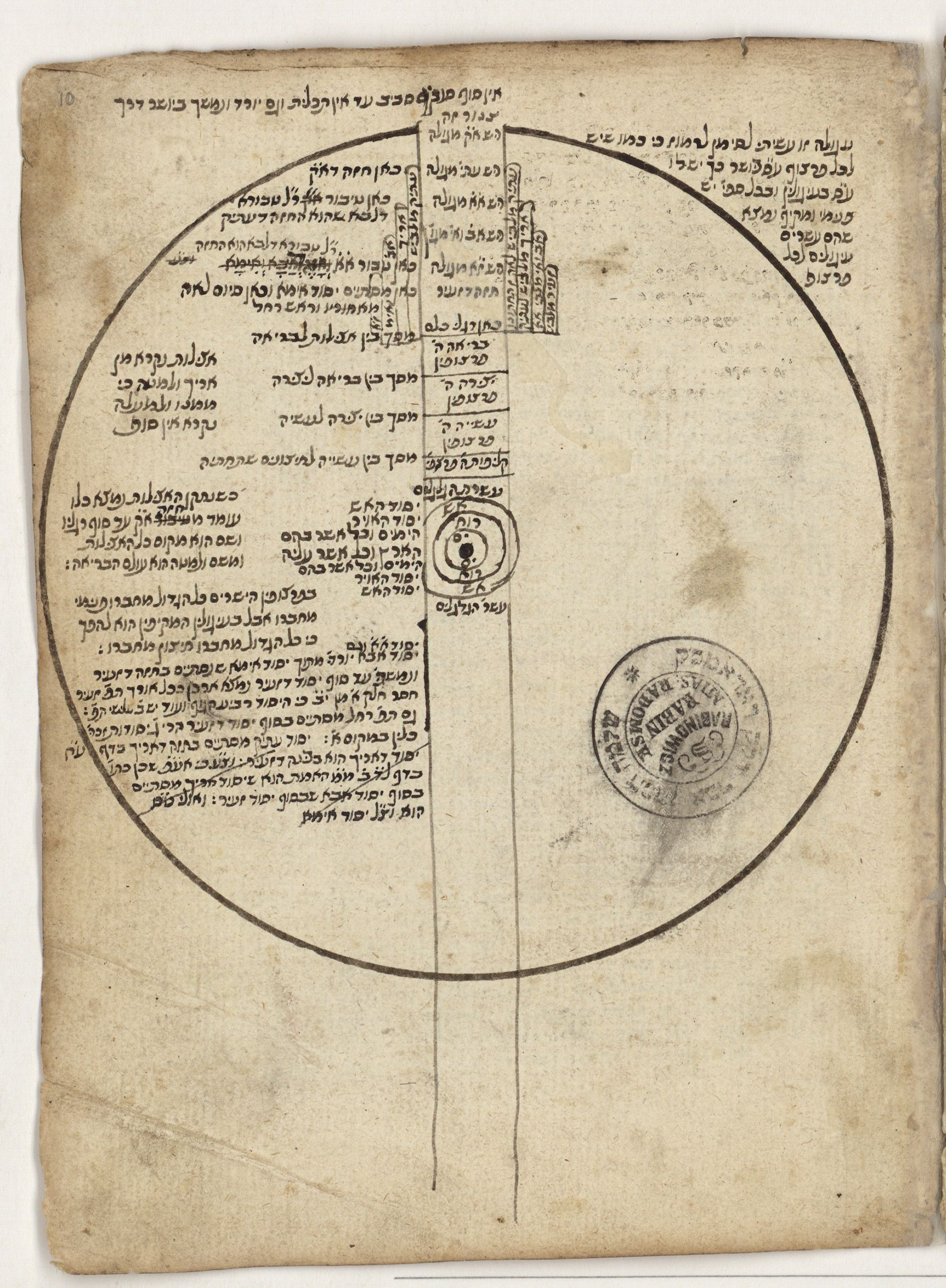
A diagram of the worlds created after the first Tzimtzum, found in a manuscript written by Lonzano

His origin is unknown, but it has been supposed that he was born in Italy. According to Jellinek, who identified Lonzano with Longano, a seaport of Messenia, his home was Greece; it may, however, have been Longiano, not far from Cesena, whose Latin name is Lonzanum. In early childhood, Lonzano lost both his father and mother, and throughout his entire life he was haunted by poverty, care, and sickness.

In his youth he went to Jerusalem and married there, but in consequence of the treachery of one of his friends, Gedaliah Cordovero, he was compelled to leave the city; he went to Constantinople, where he enjoyed the hospitality of a certain Solomon.

There also he met Samuel de Medina, whom he calls "teacher," and under whom he studied for some time. From Constantinople he returned to Jerusalem: he was compelled to travel continually to earn his bread. In old age, again driven by poverty, he returned to Italy, having spent altogether about forty years of his life in Jerusalem. Though paralyzed in both feet and with the sight of one eye entirely lost, he preached twice in an Italian synagogue and gave the community cause to marvel at his unusual knowledge of midrashic literature. A fund was raised by the congregation to support him and to enable him to return to Jerusalem, and a petition was sent to a wealthy man asking him for a generous contribution. This letter (Mortara, No. 12) has been published by David Kaufmann. Lonzano died in the outskirts of Jerusalem and was buried there.

Lonzano had three children; a son, Adonikam, died at an early age. He was the father-in-law of the historian David Conforte. Lonzano of Florence (1716), author of a responsum mentioned in Shemesh Ẓedaḳah may be one of his descendants.

== Works ==
Lonzano's first work, composed and printed in his youth, probably in Constantinople about 1572, contains Derekh Ḥayyim, a moral poem of 315 verses; Pizmonim u-Baḳḳashot, hymns and prayers; and Avodat Miḳdash, a poetical description of the daily sacrifice in the Temple.

He wrote commentaries to most of his poems; this was, indeed, often necessary on account of the obscurity of his verses, especially where they are kabbalistic in content and employ the kabbalistic terminology. He generally indicates the meters of the piyyuṭim, many of which were set to Arabic melodies because these, the author thought, were better adapted, on account of their melancholy, to arouse feelings of devotion and humility; or, as he says further on in the same work, because they sound more solemn than any others. He is well aware of the fact that high authorities objected to the use of foreign melodies for hymns, but he does not share their view, although he objects most strongly to the practise of imitating the sound of foreign words by means of Hebrew assonants. He condemns, for instance, Shem Nora, imitating the title of the Italian song "Seniora"; and he felt compelled to declare solemnly before God and Israel that he used foreign terms only to praise the Lord and not for profane or frivolous purposes.

From the point of view of literary history the passage in Shete Yadot in which he names those payyeṭanim he preferred is valuable. He considers a good religious poem one that would cheer and gladden him while it would also make him weep; that would break the haughtiness of his heart and inspire him with love for God. His poems were often quoted by kabbalists, and some of his piyyuṭim became part of the Sephardic Maḥzor.

=== Shetei Yadot ===
Lonzano called his chief work Shetei Yadot (= "Two Hands"; Venice, 1618), taking the title from Exodus 26:17; and, keeping to the same figure, he divided these two "hands" into five "fingers" (eẓba'ot) each. The five fingers of the first part, called Yad Ani ("Hand of the Poor"; compare Ezekiel 16:49), are as follows:

1. Or Torah, Masoretic studies, and emendations of the Masoretic text of the Pentateuch. For this he used old Pentateuchal manuscripts, from which he took much valuable material not found in other sources. He possessed some very valuable manuscript midrashim, among them some which even the authors of the Arukh and of Yalkut Shimoni had never seen. To aid him in collecting his splendid library, his friends wrote to the communities of Jerusalem, Aleppo, and Damascus, and he obtained books from those cities. An illustration of Lonzano's thoroughness is found in the passage in which he says: "I have made this correction on the strength of ten or more manuscripts, not one of which could be copied [now] for 100 ducats, and some of which are more than five or six hundred years old, namely: the Masoret Seyag la-Torah of Meir ben Todros HaLevi Abulafia (a manuscript of the Masorah), the Ḳiryat Sefer of Menachem Meiri, the Eṭ Sofer of David Kimhi, the Shemen Sason, and various others. Accordingly, if any one is in doubt as to the reading of any passage in the Bible, with God's help I will resolve his perplexity, especially if I am at home." Lonzano could not endure the thought that this scientific material was lying idle or that it might perish with him. He therefore determined to publish the book, even at an expense of a hundred ducats for printing, although he was well aware that he was acting cruelly toward his needy family in Jerusalem, to which he could send no money. The Or Torah was afterward published separately. Jedidiah Norzi, a contemporary and friend of Menahem Lonzano, drew upon Lonzano's work while it was still in manuscript form, when composing his own masoretic work, Minḥat Shai.
2. Ma'arikh, explanations in alphabetical order of foreign words in the Talmud, the Midrashim, and the Zohar. His knowledge of Arabic and Greek, gained during his toilsome journeys, proved of great service in his philosophical investigations. In the introduction to this part he speaks, not without humor, of his new method of treating these loan-words and of the way he came to adopt it. Thus Lonzano actually reintroduced into lexicography the rational, scientific spirit of the old, classic Hebræo-Arabic philologists, despite the opposition of his contemporaries and against the authority of old, recognized teachers, including even the author of the Arukh. The valuable summary of the Ma'arikh by Philippe d'Aquin (Paris, 1629) has been published in modern times by A. Jellinek (Leipzig, 1853), and is printed in the Lemberg edition of the Arukh of Nathan ben Jehiel of Rome under the title Arba'ah Sefarim Niftaḥim (1857).
3. The Avodat Miḳdash
4. Derekh Ḥayyim are reprints, with additions, from his first work, mentioned above; the Avodat Miḳdash was published also by Judah Perez in his collection Sha'are Raḥamim (1710), by Jacob Emden (1767), by Azriel of Vilna (Fürth, 1726), and at Venice at the end of the sixteenth century.
5. Ṭovah Tokhaḥat, didactic poems, written at the house of Solomon, his patron in Constantinople. These are largely borrowed from a collection of short moral proverbs, entitled Sefer Toẓe'ot Ḥayyim, by a certain Moses ben Nathanael ibn Solomon.

The second part of Shetei Yadot, called Yad haMelekh, and also divided into five "fingers," is a collection of old midrashic works, some of which appeared here for the first time; others afforded more complete and correct texts than any previously known. Lonzano himself, on account of lack of money, could print only: (1) Haggadat Bereshit. Of the remaining four "fingers" of the Yad ha-Melekh, (2) Midrash Agur was published, according to Benjacob in 1626, at Safed or Kefar 'Ain Zeitun; but Steinschneider denies that it ever appeared in print. The other three "fingers" exist only in manuscript: (3) Tanna Devei Eliyahu; (4) Avot de-Rabbi Natan, Tractate Derekh eretz, Otiyyot deRabbi Akiva; (5) Sefer ha-Tashlumin, containing the remaining portions of Genesis Rabbah, and supplements to Midrash Yelammedenu, Sifra, Sifre, and Tanḥuma.

=== Other works ===
Lonzano wrote also: Adi Zahav, glosses to the Lebush of Mordecai Jaffe; Imrei Emet, notes on Hayyim Vital's Kabbalah; Omer Man, commentary on Idra Zuṭa, a part of the Zohar; and lexicographical observations on the Talmud Yerushalmi.

== Characterization ==
In spite of physical infirmities, Lonzano was an eager combatant, and not only defended his own conclusions with energy, but also aggressively attacked both his predecessors and his contemporaries. At the same time he always felt conscious that their worth was as far above his as the "heaven is above the earth". He assails the author of the midrashic commentary Mattenat Kehunnah, attacks Israel ben Moses Najara on account of blasphemous illustrations and expressions in his Olat Ḥodesh, disputes with Abraham Monson concerning Vital's kaballah, with Solomon Norzi concerning the Masorah, and with others. It can easily be understood that in his single-minded devotion to the truth, "to which all owe the highest regard", Lonzano made many personal enemies. In only one respect does he seem to have been in harmony with the spirit of the time, and that was in his love for kabbalah and his hostility toward philosophy.
