= Samuel Vita della Volta =

- Born: 24 September 1772; Mantua, Habsburg monarchy
- Died: 29 March 1853 (aged 80)
- Education: University of Ferrara (1802)
- Occupation: Physician

Samuel Vita della Volta (Hebrew: שמואל חי מלאוולטא, romanized: Shmuel Ḥay mi-Lavolta; 24 September 1772 – 29 March 1853), also known by the acronyms שמ״ח and שח״ם, was an Italian physician and Hebraist, who flourished in Mantua. He wrote a number of commentaries, sermons, and responsa (especially on medical issues), which remain in manuscript.

Della Volta was the owner of a large Hebrew library, which, together with its 131 manuscripts, came into the possession of Marco Mortara. He was also a contributor to the periodical Kerem Ḥemed. A letter from Isaac Samuel Reggio to Della Volta appeared in Otzar Neḥmad (III, pp. 25–27), and several letters between him and Samuel David Luzzatto are preserved in his Epistolario italiano, francese, latino (1890).

== Selected works ==
The following works are held in the Kaufmann manuscript collection at the Hungarian Academy of Sciences in Budapest:

- Kuntras ktiv ismaḥ (1791). Commentaries, sermons, and responsa.
- Kuntras ayin be-ayin (1792). Talmudic commentaries.
- Igerot. Correspondences from 1793 to 1797.
- Kuntras Torah or (1794). Biblical commentaries.
- Derekh drash (I, 1794; II, 1797)
- Dan yadin (1797).
- Preface to Shlomo Norzi's Minḥat shai (1819).
- Igerot el maskilei ha-dor be-Italia. Correspondences from 1838 to 1840.
- Kilutim. Assorted historical texts and poems in Hebrew and Italian.
- Likutim. Sermons.
- Meshiv nefesh. Prayers for Yom Kippur.
