= Ben Naphtali =

Rabbi and Masorete who flourished about 890-940

Ben Naphtali (Hebrew: אַבּוּ עִמְרָן מֹשֶׁה בֶּן דָּוִד בֶּן נַפְתָּלִי, romanized: ʾAbbū ʿĪmrān, Mōše ben Dāwīḏ ben Nap̄tālī) was a rabbi and Masorete who flourished around 890-940 CE, probably in Tiberias. Of his life little is known.

His first name is in dispute. Some medieval authorities called him "Jacob"; two Chufut-Kale manuscripts have "Moses b. David"; a third contains his epigraph, which is incomplete, only "ben David ben Naphtali" remaining. His name is most likely Abu Imran, Moshe ben David ben Naphtali as preserved in Mishael ben Uzziel's 11th century treatise and in the Cairo Geniza fragment T-S K27.36 in the University Library at Cambridge.

== Ben Naphtali and Ben Asher ==
Ben Naphtali wrote a Bible with vowels, accents, and Masorah, which differed in some respects from that of his contemporary and rival, Aaron ben Moses ben Asher (generally called Ben Asher). This Bible codex has not been preserved, but the differences between it and Ben Asher's version are found in incomplete Masoretic lists found in quotations in David Ḳimḥi, Norzi, and other medieval writers as well as in manuscripts such as British Museum MS. Harley 1528. These lists are printed in the Mikraot Gedolot (rabbinical Bible), in the texts of Baer-Delitzsch and Christian David Ginsburg's Masorah vol. iii. A complete list of these differences can be found in Mishael Ben Uzziel's treatise Kitāb Al-Khilaf, the book of the Ḥillufim (Differences), which is thought to have been written before 1050.

It was reconstructed from fragments and critically edited by Lazar Lipschütz in 1965. The differences between Ben Naphtali and Ben Asher number about 860, about nine-tenths of which refer to the placing of the accents מתג and געיא. The remaining ones have reference to דגש and רפה, to vowels, accents, and consonantal spelling.

== Relation to the Received Text ==
The differences between the two Masoretes do not represent solely personal opinions; the two rivals represent different schools. Like the Ben Ashers there seem to have been several Ben Naphtalis. The statement of Elia Levita that the Westerns follow Ben Asher, and the Easterns Ben Naphtali, is not without many exceptions. Thus, for instance, in the difference concerning I Kings iii. 20 the Westerns are said to agree with Ben Naphtali, while the Easterns follow Ben Asher. The rule of Ben Naphtali given under No. 5 is followed in most manuscripts and printed editions, in the words ביקרותיך (Ps. xlv. 10) and ליקהת (Prov. xxx. 17), etc. The Masoretic lists often do not agree on the precise nature of the differences between the two rival authorities; it is, therefore, impossible to define with exactness their differences in every case; and it is probably due to this fact that the received text does not follow uniformly the system of either Ben Asher or Ben Naphtali. The attempt is likewise futile to describe the one codex as Western or Eastern.

== Jewish Encyclopedia bibliography ==
- Diḳduḳe ha-Ṭe'amim, ed. Baer and Strack, p. 11;
- Harris, The Jewish Quarterly Review i. 250;
- Ginsburg, Introduction to the Masoretico-Critical Edition of the Hebrew Bible, pp. 241 et seq.

== Other sources ==
- Kahle, Paul, Masoreten des Westens I: 1927, repr. 1967 and 2005
- Kahle, Paul, Masoreten des Westens II: 1930
