= Aaron ben Moses ben Asher =

Jewish scribe who refined the Tiberian system of writing vowel sounds in Hebrew

Aaron ben Moses ben Asher (Hebrew: אַהֲרוֹן בֶּן משֶׁה בֶּן אָשֵׁר, romanized: ʾAhăron ben Moše ben ʾĀšēr; 10th century, died c. 960) was a sofer (Jewish scribe) who lived in Tiberias. He perfected the Tiberian system of writing vowel sounds in Hebrew. The system is still in use today, serving as the basis for grammatical analysis.

== Biography ==
Aaron ben Moses ben Asher lived and worked in the city of Tiberias, on the western shore of the Sea of Galilee. He was descended from a long line of Masoretes, starting with someone called Asher, but nothing is known about them other than their names. His father, Moses ben Asher, is credited with writing the Cairo Codex of the Prophets (895 CE). If authentic, it is among the oldest manuscripts containing a large proportion of the Hebrew Bible.

=== Was ben Asher a Karaite? ===
Scholars have long debated as to whether Aaron ben Asher was a Karaite. While many modern scholars lean toward this being true, there is no clear consensus, and so the question remains open.

The idea was first suggested in 1860 by Simhah Pinsker, who argued that Masoretes in general should be ‘suspected’ of being Karaites since they seem to have devoted all of their time to the Bible and showed no interest in rabbinic Midrash or Talmud, which at times contradicts the Masoretic Text. Numerous other pieces of circumstantial evidence were presented to make a strong case, however not strong enough to tip the scales and end the debate.

Some examples of evidence for this assertion include:

- Strong parallels to Karaite theology in the way both Aaron and his father Moshe write about all three parts of the Hebrew Bible being equally authoritative in terms of halakha (a classic Karaite position);
- The Masoretic Text does not follow the order set down in the Talmud (Isaiah after Ezekiel), which was accepted as authoritative by Rabbanites, but rejected by the Karaites (the Masoretic Text also differs from verses quoted in the Talmud);
- The Codex contains a prayer for the protection of a temple (presumably referring to the Karaite temple, as the Rabbanites did not have a temple at the time);
- Writings of the time refer to the Ben Ashers with honorifics more typically used by Karaites (such as melamed (teacher) and maskil ('enlightened one');
- Indications that the Codex Cairensis, thought to have been written by his father, was sponsored by a Karaite (based on language used by the sponsor);
- The Codex was in the possession of the Karaites since the time of its inscribed dedication (even before they ransomed it from the crusaders).

A turning point came in the 1950s when Benjamin Klar discovered that an anti-Karaite polemical poem by Sa‘adia Gaon criticized a Karaite masorete by the name of "ben Asher". (Note: Gatez seems to have already made these connections about 60 years earlier.) This agrees with Sa‘adia's rejection of ben Asher in favor of the rival school of ben Naftali, as well as the fact that ben Asher became accepted as relations between the Karaites and Rabbanites improved. Aron Dotan has dealt with many of the arguments, including Klar's, and also argued that the approval of Maimonides is evidence against the claim. (Note: Although Dotan is credited with this argument, nearly 100 years earlier Isidore Harris too listed the arguments for and against, including the argument from Maimonides approval.) However, according to Zer, few researchers have expressed their support for Dotan's position.

== Works ==
The Aleppo Codex

Ben Asher was the first systematic Hebrew grammarian. In an age where Hebrew grammatical principles were not considered worthy of independent study, he was the first to take this discipline seriously. His Sefer Dikdukei ha-Te'amim ('Grammatical Analysis of the Accents') was an original collection of grammatical rules and Masoretic information.

Ben Asher added mesorah (vowelization and cantillation notes) to the Aleppo Codex, correcting its letter-text according to the Masoretic Text. The value of this work is that the grammatical rules presented by ben Asher reveal the linguistic background of vocalization for the first time.

== Legacy ==
For over a thousand years, ben Asher has been regarded by Jews of all persuasions as having produced the most accurate version of the Masoretic Text. Since his day, handwritten manuscripts and printed versions of the Hebrew Bible have, for the most part, followed his system.

Maimonides accepted the views of ben Asher only in regard to open and closed sections, but apparently admired his work generally and helped to establish and spread his authority. Referring to a Bible manuscript then in Egypt, Maimonides wrote, in Laws of the Torah Scroll 8:4: "All relied on it, since it was corrected by ben Asher and was worked on and analyzed by him for many years, and was proofread many times in accordance with the masorah, and I based myself on this manuscript in the Sefer Torah that I wrote".

Umberto Cassuto used the Aleppo Codex as the basis of his edition of the Hebrew Bible.

== See also ==
- Leningrad Codex
