= Masoretes =

Jewish scribe-scholars

The Masoretes (Hebrew: בַּעֲלֵי הַמָּסוֹרָה, romanized: Baʿălēy Hammāsōrā, lit. 'Masters of the Tradition') were groups of Jewish scribe-scholars who worked from around the end of the 5th through 10th centuries AD, based primarily in the Jewish centers of the Levant (e.g., Tiberias and Jerusalem) and Mesopotamia (e.g., Sura and Nehardea). Each group compiled a system of pronunciation and grammatical guides in the form of diacritical notes (niqqud) on the external form of the text of the Hebrew Bible (the Tanakh) in an attempt to standardize its pronunciation, paragraph and verse divisions, and cantillation for the worldwide Jewish community.

The ben Asher family of Masoretes was largely responsible for the preservation and production of the Masoretic Text, although there existed an alternative Masoretic text of the ben Naphtali Masoretes, which has around 875 differences from the ben Asher text. The halakhic authority Maimonides endorsed the ben Asher as superior, although the Egyptian Jewish scholar, the Saadya Gaon, preferred the ben Naphtali system. It has been suggested that the ben Asher family and the majority of the Masoretes were Karaites. However, Geoffrey Khan believes that the ben Asher family was probably not Karaite, and Aron Dotan avers that there are "decisive proofs that M. Ben-Asher was not a Karaite."

The Masoretes devised the vowel notation system for Hebrew that is still widely used, as well as the trope symbols used for cantillation.

The nakdanim were successors to the Masoretes in the transmission of the traditional Hebrew text of the Old Testament.
