= Leather in Judaism =

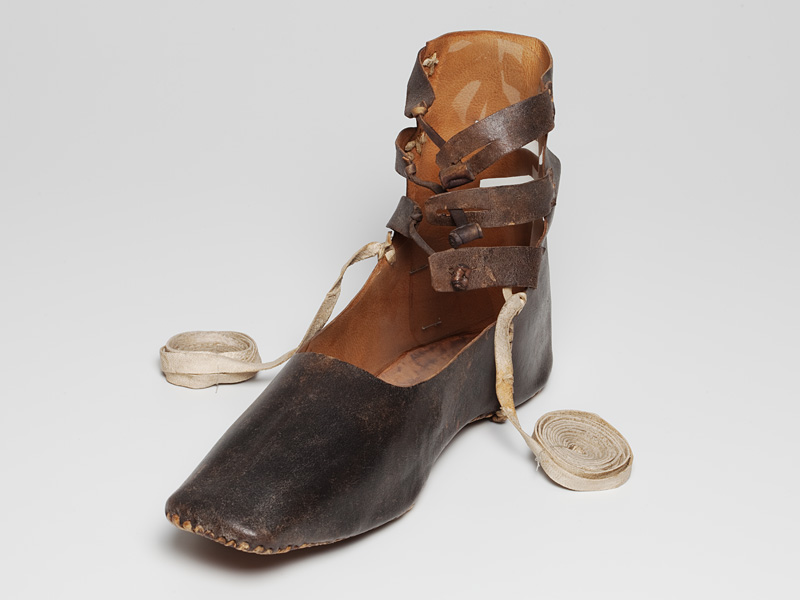
19th century leather Chalitza shoe, in the Jewish Museum of Switzerland's collection.

Leather has played an important role in Judaism and in Jewish life. Many items widely used by observant Jews are made from leather, such as:

- Torah scrolls are handwritten copies of the Torah (Pentateuch), the holiest book within Judaism. It is inscribed by a Sofer on leather parchment. Torah scrolls must meet extremely strict standards of production.
- Mezuzahs are pieces of parchment (often contained in a decorative case) inscribed with specified Hebrew verses from the Torah (Deuteronomy 6:4–9 and 11:13–21). Jewish religious law requires that a mezuzah be affixed to every doorway in the home, apart from bathrooms and closets too small to qualify as rooms.
- Tefillin (phylacteries) are a set of small black leather boxes containing scrolls of parchment inscribed with verses from the Torah, which are worn by observant Jews during weekday morning prayers.
- Halizah (also spelled "Chalitza") is a ritual ceremony described in the Torah (Deuteronomy 25:5–10). The Torah instructs that if a married man dies childless, the widow is obligated to marry her dead husband's brother in a process called Yibum ("Levirate marriage"). By performing the haliza ceremony, which involves the taking off of her brother-in-law's leather shoe by the widow, the widow and her husband's brother could avoid their duty to marry. After the ceremony, the brother-in-law is released from his obligation to marry the widow and she becomes free to marry whomever she desires
- Malkot was corporal punishment by whipping with a leather whip administered in Biblical times.

== Introduction ==
References to leather are found in the Hebrew Bible and Talmud. Leather was originally worn to protect against weather conditions. Over time, leather was slowly replaced by other resources as a source for garments. The first reference to leather is in the Book of Genesis that states that God gave man a “coat of skins”. In addition, the Patriarchs continued to wear the “coat of skins” throughout their rule. Leather constantly surrounded the day-to-day life of the Hebrews. The discovery of tanning led to sandals, helmets, shields, utensils, mats, and skins for transporting water.

The Talmud references several usages of leather throughout its pages. It is likely because of the prevalence of tanning during Talmudic times that many of the articles were written on leather parchment. During Talmudic times, leather was often used in day-to-day life.

== Biblical data ==
Skins of animals were employed for clothing as soon as humans felt the need of covering their bodies to protect themselves against cold and rain. With the advance of civilization such clothing was everywhere replaced by products of the loom. The same was the case among the Hebrews. The "coat of skins" was regarded by them as having been the first kind of clothing, given to humans by God Himself (Gen. iii. 21); and the mantle of skins was still worn in the time of the Patriarchs (Gen. xxv. 25). In historic times the use of the mantle of skins is mentioned only in the case of the prophets Elijah and Elisha, who, in intentional contrast to the people of their day, wore the ancient, simple garb (I Kings xix. 13; II Kings i. 8; ii. 8, 13 et seq.); indeed, the hairy mantle came in time to be the distinguishing feature of a prophet's garb (Zech. xiii. 4; Matt. iii. 4, vii. 15).

After the Hebrews had acquired the art of tanning, which must have been at an early date, leather came to be used for a number of other purposes. Among articles of clothing it was employed chiefly for sandals. Leather girdles are also mentioned (II Kings i. 8 et al.). Warriors had leather helmets to protect their heads, and shields also was usually of leather. For utensils in daily use leather is principally employed among nomads, as it was among the ancient Israelites, since receptacles of leather are not liable to be broken and are easily carried about. The original form of a table, as the word indicates, was a piece of leather, which was spread upon the ground. Pails and all other vessels for holding liquids were made of leather. The leather bucket for drawing water out of a well and the leather flask—consisting of a single skin removed from the animal's carcass as intact as possible—for holding wine or for transporting water have remained in common use in the Levant down to the present day. Skins of goats and sheep were generally used for these various purposes; more seldom, those of oxen. Concerning tanning, although it was probably familiar to the Hebrews from the oldest times, nothing is said in the Old Testament. Not once is a tanner mentioned.

== In the Talmud ==
The Talmud speaks of many articles made of skins, and as tanning was practiced in Talmudic times, it is possible that such articles, or at least some of them, were of leather. The strap ("reẓu'ah") is mentioned as serving various purposes. Asses were hobbled with straps; and cows were led by means of straps tied to the horns (Shab. 54b). Women used to tie their hair with leather straps (ib. 57a); and by similar means shoes and sandals were fastened to the feet (Neg. xi. 11), and the tefillin to the head and arm (Men. 35b). Flagellation ("malḳut") was performed by means of three straps—one of calfskin and two of ass' skin (Mak. 22b); straps are frequently mentioned as instruments of punishment, especially of children (Yer. Giṭ. i. 43d, et passim). It appears that straps were used to tie up certain objects, as the untying of the strap is often used to designate relaxation (Yer. Bik. i. 64a, et passim). It is very probable that sandals generally were made of thick hide; for wooden sandals are indicated as such (Yeb. 101a, et passim). Besides shoes, the Talmud speaks of leather hose ("anpilia"), and of a kind of glove and foot-wear of skin for a cripple who was compelled to use his hands in order to move from place to place (ib. 102b).

The Mishnah (Kelim xxvi. 5) enumerates the following articles made of leather: a covering for the mule or ass; aprons worn by muleteers and by surgeons to protect their clothes; a cradle-cover; a child's breast-piece to protect it from the scratching of a cat; aprons by which wool-carders and flax-spinners protected themselves from the waste of the wool or the tow of the flax; the pad placed by the porter under his load; and skins used for various purposes by individuals not engaged in any business or trade ("'orot ba'al ha-bayit"). In Mishnah 8 of the same chapter, tanners' skins are spoken of; but certainly untanned skins are meant, similar to those referred to in Shab. 49a as having been spread by the tanner for people to sit upon.

== See also ==
- Duchsustus
- Gevil
- Klaf
- Mezuzah
- Sefer Torah
- Tefillin
