= Ashour =

Ashour is a surname. Notable people with the surname include:

- Ali Ashour (politician), M.A., (born 1960), judge and a Libyan politician
- Ashour Bin Khayal (born 1939), Libyan diplomat and politician
- Ashour Bourashed, member of the Libyan National Transitional Council representing the city of Derna
- Ashour Suleiman Shuwail (born 1954), Libyan minister of interior from July 2012
- Emam Ashour (born 1998), Egyptian footballer
- Hisham Mohd Ashour (born 1982), professional squash player who represents Egypt
- Hossam Ashour (born 1986), Egyptian footballer
- Magdy Ashour, Egyptian activist
- Mohamed Ashour Khawaja (born 1987), Libyan sprinter, specialising in the 400 metres
- No'man Ashour (1918–1987), Egyptian poet and playwright,
- Omar Ashour, political scientist, human rights activist, and a martial arts champion from Montreal
- Radwa Ashour (1946–2014), Egyptian novelist
- Ramy Ashour (born 1987), professional squash player from Egypt
- Said Ashour (1922–2009), professor of history in Cairo University, author of 22 books
- Saleh Ashour, member of the Kuwaiti National Assembly

== See also ==
- Ashur
- Asur (disambiguation)
