= Achour =

Achour is both a surname and a given name. Notable people with the name include:

== Surname ==
- Ahmed Achour (born 1945), Tunisian composer and conductor
- Dallal Merwa Achour (born 1994), Algerian volleyball player
- Doria Achour (born 1991), Tunisian film director and actress
- Fateh Achour, Algerian footballer
- Habib Achour, Tunisian trade unionist
- Hassan Achour, Algerian footballer and manager
- Khaled Achour, Tunisian handball player
- Lotfi Achour, Tunisian writer
- Mohamed Fadhel Ben Achour (1909–1970), Tunisian theologian and writer
- Mouloud Achour (journalist, born 1944), Algerian writer, professor, and journalist
- Mouloud Achour (journalist, born 1980), French-Algerian journalist, television host, and actor
- Sana Ben Achour, Tunisian academic
- Yadh Ben Achour (born 1945), Tunisian lawyer

== Given name ==
- Achour Fenni, Algerian poet, translator and academician
- Achour Hasni, Algerian handball player

== See also ==
- Dar Ben Achour, a palace in the medina of Tunis
- El Achour, a suburb of the city of Algiers
- Ashura (disambiguation)
- Ashur (disambiguation)
