= Asuri =

Ashuri or Asuri or Ashurit may refer to:

- Assyrian
- "Of Assyria" (in Aramaic, Arabic, Hebrew)
  - Ashur (god), the national God of Assyria
  - Ktav Ashuri or "Assyrian script", the Hebrew alphabet
- Sanskrit asuri:
  - Feminine of Asura, a group of power-seeking deities
  - The feminine divinity Devi
  - Maya or Dirghajihvi, a Rakshasi
  - A rishi mentioned in the Satapatha Brahmana
  - Asuri Kesava Somayaji, the father of Ramanuja
- Asuri metre of the Zend Avesta
- Asur people of India
  - Asuri language, an Austro-Asiatic language spoken by the Asur tribes

== See also ==
- Ashur (disambiguation)
- Asura (disambiguation)
- Asur (disambiguation)
