= Ktav Ashuri =

Talmudic name for the Hebrew alphabet

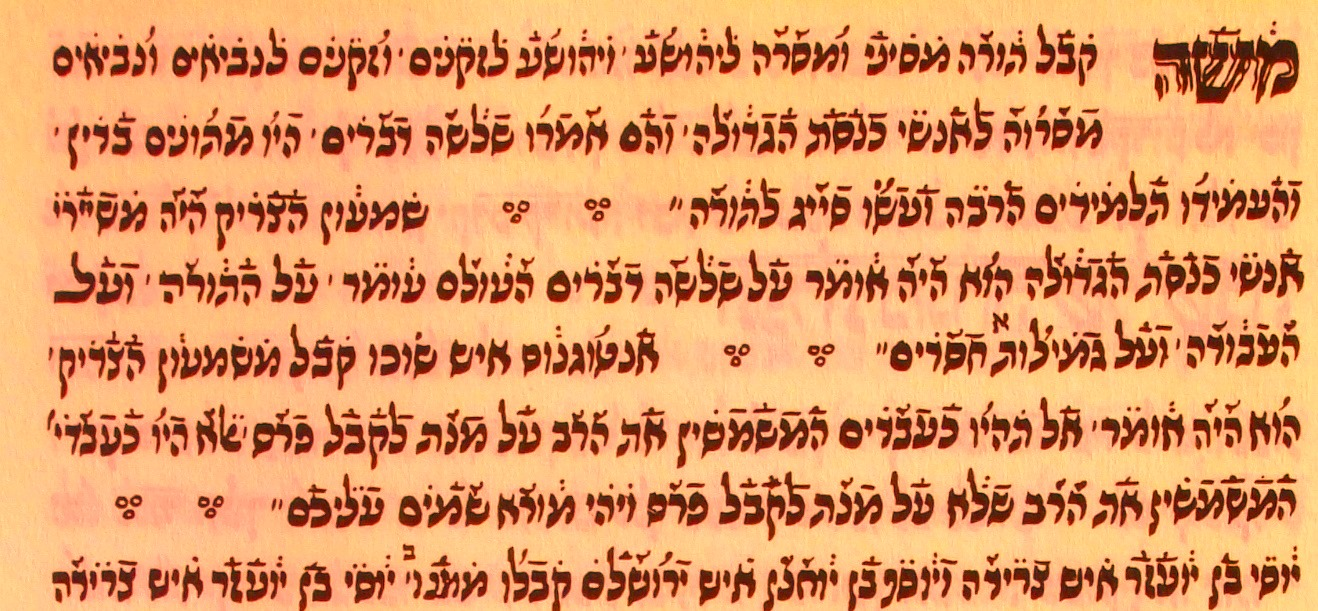
Pirkei Avot in the Ashurit script, with Babylonian vocalization according to Yemenite scribal custom

Ktav Ashuri (Hebrew: כְּתָב אַשּׁוּרִי, k'tav ashurí, lit. "Assyrian Writing") also (Ktav) Ashurit, is the traditional Hebrew language name of the Hebrew alphabet, used to write both Hebrew and Jewish Babylonian Aramaic. It is often referred to as (the) Square script. The names "Ashuri" (Assyrian) or "square script" are used to distinguish it from the Paleo-Hebrew script.

According to Halakha (Jewish religious law), tefillin (phylacteries) and mezuzot (door-post scripts) can only be written in Ashurit.

== Name ==
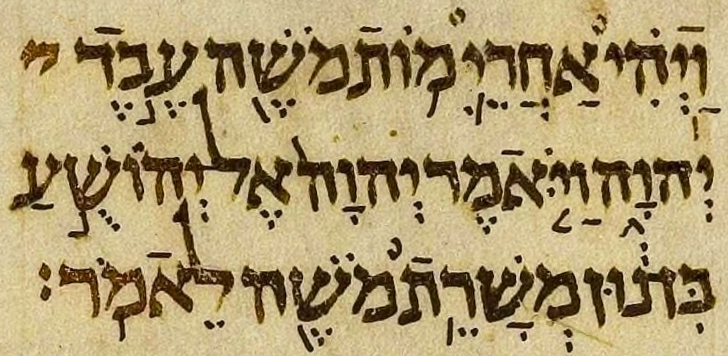
Assyrian script with Tiberian vocalization

Ktav Ashuri, is the term used in the Talmud; the modern Hebrew term for the Hebrew alphabet is simply אלפבית עברי "Alphabet Hebrew". Consequently, the term Ktav Ashuri refers primarily to a traditional calligraphic form of the alphabet used in writing the Torah. However, the term Ashuri is often used in the Babylonian Talmud to refer to the contemporary "Hebrew alphabet", as opposed to the older Paleo-Hebrew script.

The Talmud gives two opinions for why the script is called Ashuri:

1. either because the Jews brought it back with them when they returned from exile in Assyria (called Ashur in Hebrew);
2. alternatively, this script was given at Mount Sinai and then forgotten and eventually revived, and received its name because it is "me'usheret" (Hebrew: מאושרת; beautiful/praiseworthy or authorized).

The name reflects the fact that the Hebrew alphabet used by Jews (as opposed to Samaritans) was derived from the Aramaic alphabet (Hebrew: אלפבית ארמי) used in Assyria and Babylonia, in which Imperial Aramaic was the lingua franca of both empires. It thus refers to "the Aramaic alphabet as used in Judaism", and is sometimes referred to as the "Assyrian script."

The name contrasts with the name Libonaa (or Liboni) given to the Samaritan alphabet, and by extension the Paleo-Hebrew alphabet. This name is most likely derived from Lubban, i.e. the script is called "Libanian" (of Lebanon), although it has also been suggested that the name is a corrupted form of "Neapolitan", i.e. of Nablus.

== History ==
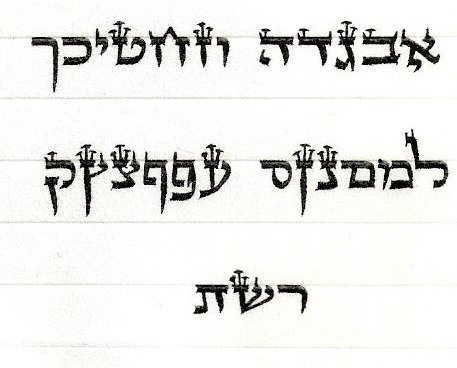
A sample of the Ashuri alphabet with tagin, written according to the Chabad scribal custom on parchment (klaf)

Mention of the Ashuri script first appears in rabbinic writings of the Mishnaic and Talmudic periods, referring to the formal script used in certain Jewish ceremonial items, such as sifrei Torah, tefillin, mezuzot, and the Five Megillot.

According to the Talmud, Ezra was the first to mandate that the sefer Torah be written in the Aramaic alphabet rather than in the Paleo-Hebrew alphabet used formerly and permitted that the Book of Daniel be composed in Aramaic. According to the Talmud, prior to Ezra the Torah had been written in Paleo-Hebrew (Ktav Ivri), and Ezra switched it to Ktav Ashuri. However, there is a dispute (in the Talmud) as to whether it was originally written in Ktav Ashuri but switched to Paleo-Hebrew, and Ezra was switching it back to the original Ktav Ashuri; or that it was originally in written Paleo-Hebrew script and Ezra was the first to change it to Ktav Ashuri. According to a third opinion, the Torah had always been written in Ktav Ashuri. The Samaritans continue to write their Samaritan Torah in Ktav Ivri, now commonly called the Samaritan script.

== See also ==
- Ktav Stam
