= Mouloud Achour =

Mouloud Achour may refer to:

- Mouloud Achour (journalist, born 1944) (1944–2020), Algerian writer, professor, and journalist
- Mouloud Achour (journalist, born 1980), French-Algerian journalist, television host, and actor
