= Asur =

Asur may refer to:

- Asura, divine beings in Hinduism regarded as evil
- Asur (film), a 2020 Indian Bengali-language drama film
- Asur (TV series), a 2020 Indian Hindi-language television series
- Asur, Thanjavur district, a village in the state of Tamil Nadu, India
- Asur, Tiruchirappalli district, a village in the state of Tamil Nadu, India
- Asur, Iran, a village in the Tehran Province of Iran
- Asur language, spoken by the Asur people
- Asur people, a Munda-speaking tribe of iron-smelters in Jharkhand
- Romanian Secular-Humanist Association (Romanian: Asociația Secular-Umanistă din România)

== See also ==
- Asura (disambiguation)
- Ashur (disambiguation)
- Ashura (disambiguation)
- Asuri (disambiguation)
- Aswang (disambiguation)
