= Ktav =

Ktav or KTAV may refer to:

- KTAV-LD, a low-power television station (channel 21, virtual 35) licensed to serve Los Angeles, California, United States
- KTAV Publishing House, an American publisher of Judaica and Jewish educational texts
- Ktav Stam, certain specific Jewish traditional writing
- Cursive Hebrew
