= KLAF =

Klaf or KLAF may refer to:

- Klaf, (or kelaf; Hebrew: קלף), the designation given a particular piece of skin in Talmudic tradition
- KLAF-LD, a low-power television station (channel 14, virtual 14) licensed to serve Lafayette, Louisiana, United States
- Purdue University Airport (ICAO airport code KLAF), a public-use airport in Tippecanoe County, Indiana, United States
