= Aswan (disambiguation) =

Aswan is a city in the south of Egypt.

Aswan may also refer to:

- Aswan (horse)
- Aswan International Airport
- Aswan Harmud
- Aswan SC

== See also ==
- Aswang (disambiguation)
