= Gevil =

Type of parchment

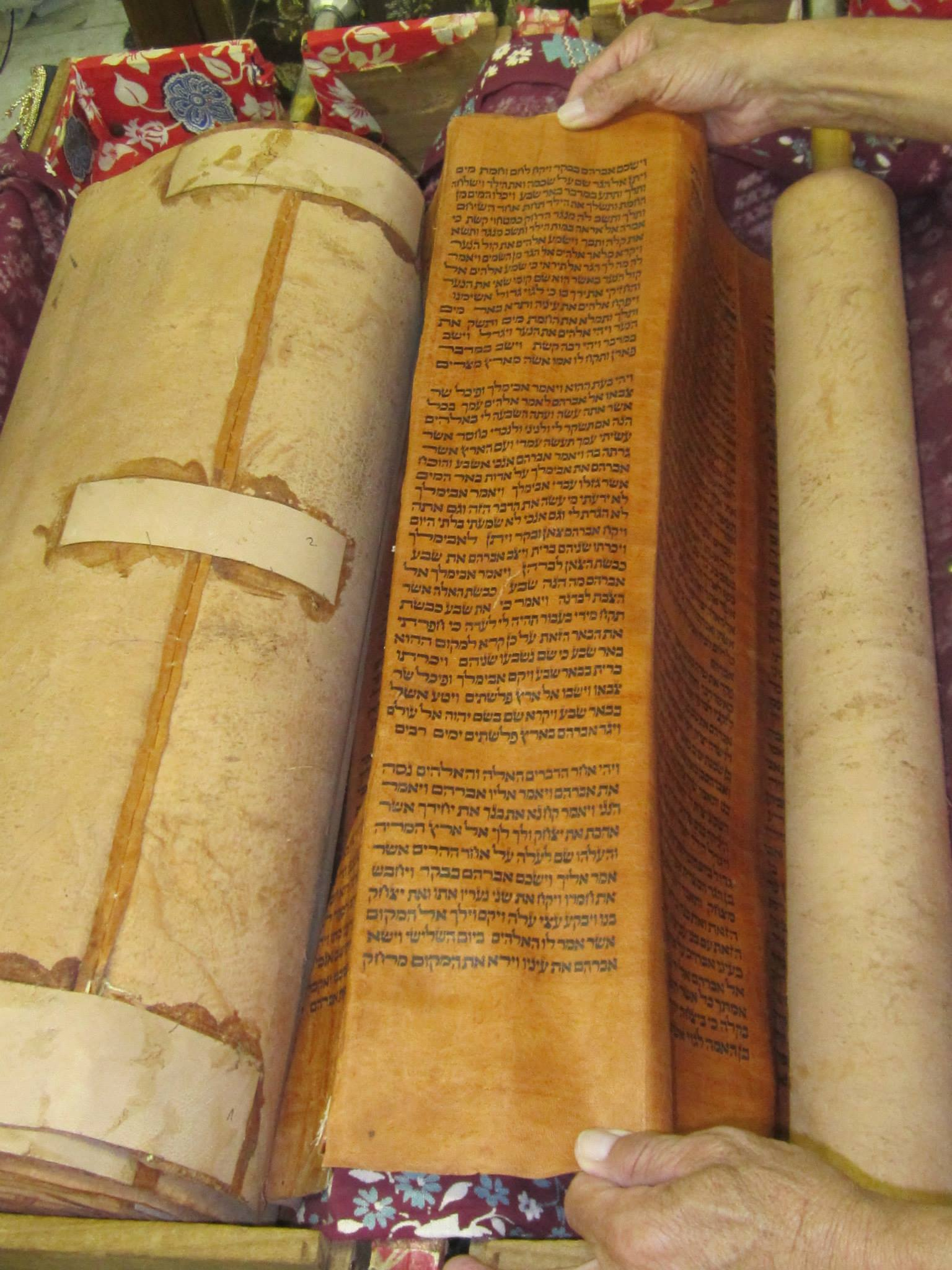
A 200-year-old Yemenite Torah scroll, on gevil parchment, from the Rambam Synagogue in Nahalat Ahim, Jerusalem. The sofer was from the Sharabi family

Gevil or gewil (Hebrew: גויל) or (Hebrew: גוויל) is a type of parchment made from full-grain animal hide that has been prepared as a writing material in Jewish scribal documents, in particular a Sefer Torah (Torah scroll).

== Etymology ==
Related to גויל, gewil, a rolling (i.e. unhewn) stone, "to roll." (Jastrow)

== Definition and production ==
Gevil is a form skin for safrut (halakhic writing) that is made of tanned, whole hide. The precise requirements for processing gevil are laid down by the Talmud, Geonim and Rishonim.

Rabbi Ḥiyya bar Ami said in the name of Ulla: There are three [untanned] hide [stages before it is tanned into gevil]: matza, ḥifa, and diftera.

According to Jewish law, the preparation of gevil follows a procedure of salting, flouring and tanning with afatzim (lit. "tannin"), which latter is derived from gallnuts, or similar substances having tannic acid.

Maimonides required rubbing down the raw hide with flour (presumably barley flour), although Simeon Kayyara, in his Halachot Gedolot, required flour being placed inside a tub of water, into which the raw hide was inserted and left for a few days. The action of the flour-based liquor served to soften the hide.

These requirements were reconfirmed as a Law given to Moses at Sinai by Maimonides, in his Mishneh Torah. Gallnuts are rich in tannic acid and are the product of a tree's reaction to an invasive parasitic wasp's egg. The pure black tint of the ink used in writing Torah scrolls results from the reaction between the tannic acid and iron sulfate (a powder used to make the ink).

== The three types of tanned skin ==
There are three forms of tanned skin known to Jewish law. The other two forms (klaf and dukhsustus) result from splitting the hide into two layers. The rabbinic scholars are divided upon which is the inner and which is the outer of the two halves. Maimonides is of the opinion that klaf was the inner layer and that duchsustus was the outer layer The Shulchan Aruch rules in the reverse that klaf was the outer layer and that duchsustus was the inner layer. The opinion of the Shulchan Aruch is the accepted ruling in all Jewish communities. Recently a small group has advocated for the return to using the full hide known as gevil for Sifrei Torah as it avoids this issue, but unfortunately this solution does not work for tefillin which must be written on klaf and are not kosher if written on gevil.

== Maimonides' rules for use ==
According to most views of Jewish law, a Sefer Torah (Torah scroll) should be written on gevil parchment, as was done by Moses for the original Torah scroll he transcribed. Further, a reading of the earliest extant manuscripts of the Mishneh Torah indicate that gevil was halakha derived from Moses and thus required for Torah scrolls.

Maimonides wrote that it is a law given to Moses at Sinai that a Torah scroll must be written on either gevil or klaf (in Maimonides' interpretation, contrary to that of the "Shulchan Aruch": the half-skin from the hair side) in order to be valid, and that it is preferable that they be written on gevil. To this end, hides procured from sheep or goats and calves were mostly used. The hide of a fully-grown cow, being so thick that it requires being shaved down to half its thickness on its fleshy side before it can be used (in order to remove the epidermis from the hide to make it thinner), was less common.

Maimonides made further prescriptions for the use of each of the three types of processed skin. Torah scrolls must be written on g'vil only on the side on which the hair had grown, and never on duchsustos (understood as the half-skin from the flesh side). Phylacteries, if written on k'laf, must be written on the flesh side. A mezuzah, when written on duchsustos, must be written on the hair side. It is unacceptable to write on k'laf on the hair side or on the split skin (either g'vil or duchsustos) on the flesh side.

== Today's practice ==
According to the Talmud, Moses used gevil for the Torah scroll he placed into the Ark of the Covenant. Elsewhere in the Talmud, there is testimony that Torah scrolls were written on gevil.

Today, a handful of Jewish scribes and artisans continue to make scroll material in this way. However, the majority of Torah scrolls are written on klaf, in their belief that the Talmud recommends (as opposed to requires) gevil and relates to the optimal beautification of the scrolls rather than an essential halachic requirement. Given the uncertainty about which layer of the hide is in fact the klaf, there is a growing movement for insisting on a return to gevil in Torah scrolls in order to avoid all doubts.

Most of the Dead Sea Scrolls (written around 200 BCE), found in and around the caves of Qumran near the Dead Sea, are written on gevil.

Properly, klaf should be used for tefillin and duchsustus for mezuzot. However, this rule is only a preference, not an obligation and klaf is used for mezuzot today but there is a minority which seeks to return to the law.

== See also ==
- Ktav Stam
