= Asuravithu =

Asuravithu (lit. 'Asura (Demon) Child') may refer to these Indian media:

- Asuravithu (novel), a Malayalam language Indian novel by M. T. Vasudevan Nair
  - Asuravithu (1968 film), a Malayalam language adaptation of the novel
- Asuravithu (2012 film), a Malayalam language action film

== See also ==
- Asura (disambiguation)
