= Asura (disambiguation) =

The Asuras are a race of power-seeking deities in Hinduism.

Asura may also refer to:

- Asura (Buddhism), the lowest ranks of the deities of the Kāmadhātu
- Asura (moth), a genus of moths in the family Erebidae
- Ahura, a class of Zoroastrian spirits
- Asur people of India

== Arts, entertainment, and media ==
=== Films ===
- Asura (2001 film), an Indian film
- Asura (2012 film), a Japanese film
- Asura (2015 film), a Telugu film
- Asura (2018 film), a Chinese film
- Asura: The City of Madness, a South Korean film

=== Manga and Anime ===
- Asura (Soul Eater), a character in the Soul Eater manga and anime series
- Asura, a spaceship used by the Time-Space Administration Bureau (TSAB) in Magical Girl Lyrical Nanoha

=== Tabletop games ===
- Asuras, a predominantly chaotic good race of celestials in the Dungeons & Dragons roleplaying game

=== Television ===
- Asura (TV series), a 2025 drama series about four sisters in 1979 Japan
- Asuras (Stargate), home world of the Asurans, a replicator race in the TV-series Stargate Atlantis

=== Video games ===
- Asura's Wrath, a video game by Capcom
- Asura, a playable race in the MMORPG, Guild Wars 2
- Asura (video game), a Thai MMORPG
- Asura, a subclass in the MMORPG Dungeon Fighter Online
- Asura, a character in Samurai Showdown
- Asura, a summonable spirit in the Final Fantasy series
- Asura, a goblinoid race in the MMORPG Guild Wars

== See also ==
- Asur (disambiguation)
- Asuran (disambiguation)
- Ashur (disambiguation)
- Ashura (disambiguation)
- Asuri (disambiguation)
- Aswang (disambiguation), asura in Philippine mythology
- Asuravithu (disambiguation), literally Asura child, various Indian media
- Gajasura (disambiguation)
- Asuravadham (lit. 'Asura Slaying'), a 2018 Indian Tamil-language film
