= Ashur =

Ashur or Assur may refer to:

== Places ==
- Assur, an archaeological site in Iraq, and former Assyrian capital
- Ashur, Iran, a village in Iran
- Assuras or Assur, a town in the Roman province of Proconsular Africa

== Other uses ==
- Ashur (Bible), the grandson of Noah in Genesis
- Ashur (god), the main god of Assyrian mythology in Mesopotamian religion
- High Elves (Warhammer) or Asur, a race in Warhammer Fantasy
- Ashur, a gladiator dominus, the titular character in the 2025 TV show Spartacus: House of Ashur

== See also ==
- Ashur-dan (disambiguation)
- Ashur-uballit (disambiguation)
- Asur (disambiguation)
- Assyria (disambiguation)
- Asura (disambiguation)
- Ashura (disambiguation)
- Achour (disambiguation)
- Assuristan, the Sassanid name for Assyria
- Anshar, a primordial god in the Babylonian creation myth Enuma Elish
