= Asuran =

Asuran means demon in several Indian languages and may refer to:

- Asuran (1983 film), a 1983 Indian Malayalam film
- Asuran (1995 film), a Tamil language science fiction horror film
- Asuran (2019 film), an Indian Tamil language action drama film by Vetrimaaran
  - Asuran (soundtrack), its soundtrack by G. V. Prakash Kumar
- Asuran (Stargate), a fictional artificial life-form in Stargate Atlantis

== See also ==
- Asura (disambiguation)
