= Tag (Hebrew writing) =

Hebrew decoration

The first four letters of the Hebrew alphabet in modern torah font, with "tagin" serif on the letter gimel.

A tag (Aramaic: תאג, plural tagin, תאגין) is a decoration drawn over some Hebrew letters in the Jewish scribal practice. The Hebrew name for this scribal feature is kether (כתר). Tag and kether mean 'crown' in Aramaic and Hebrew respectively.

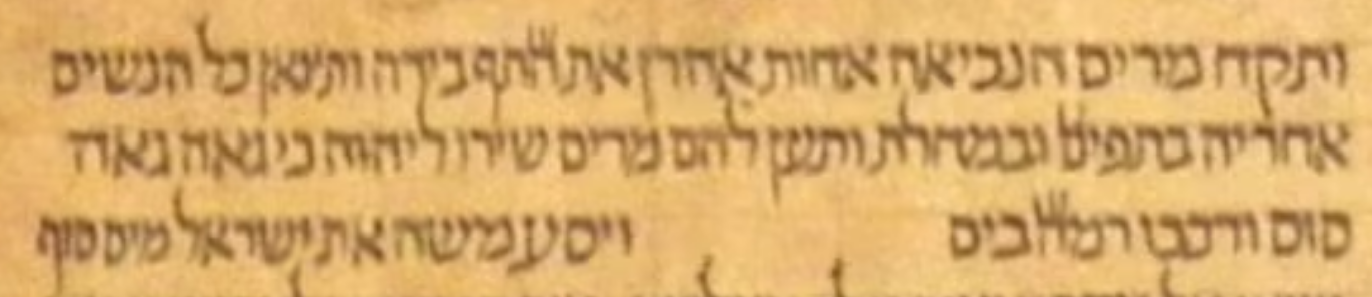
Bologna Scroll 2 (c. 1250), with exceptional tagin over specific letters.

== Medieval tagin ==
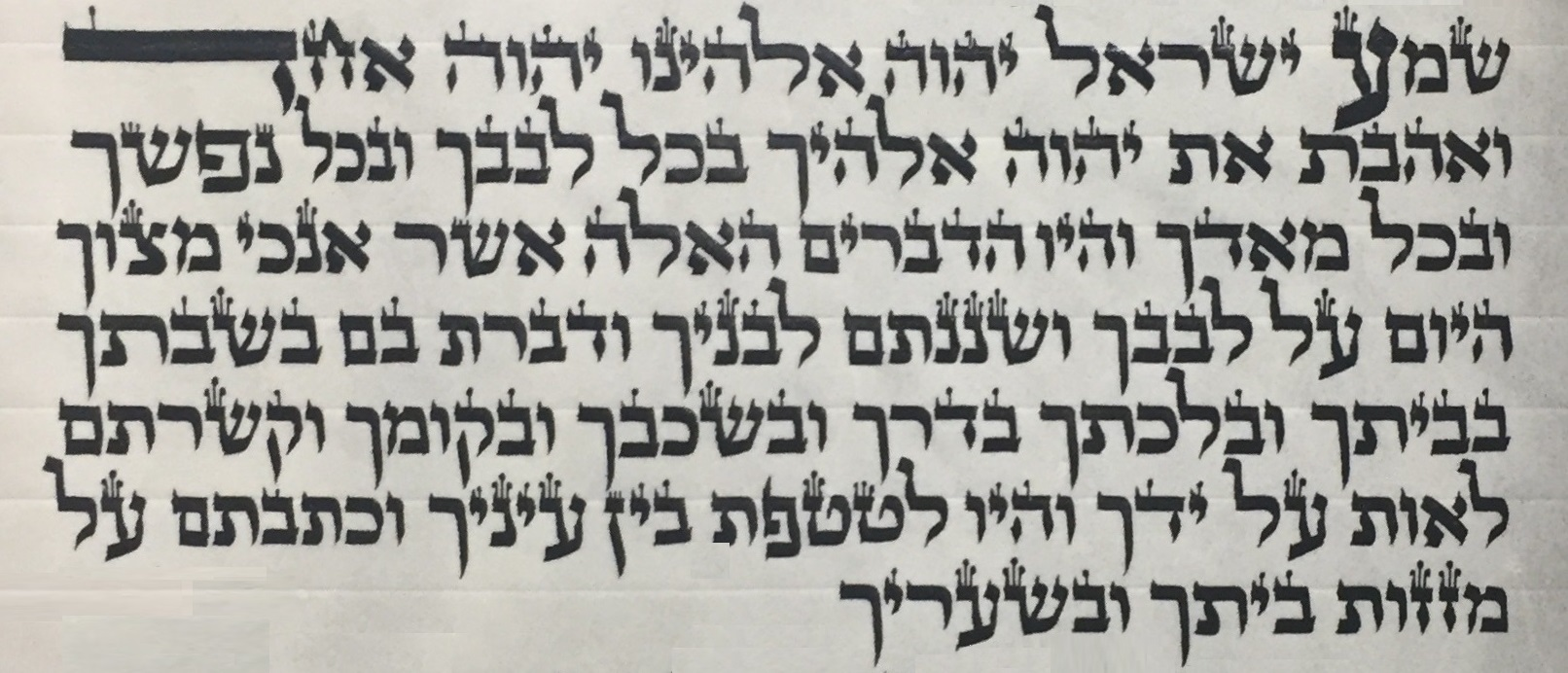
Modern mezuzah with standard serifs and tetragrammaton embellishment.

The Sefer tagin, attributed to Rabbi Akiva but not mentioned until at least the 9th century, lays out 1,960 places where modified tagin or letter forms occur in a Torah scroll. According to this work, each occurrence of a letter is to be written with between 0 and 7 tagin, as delineated in the lists contained therein. Many similar lists exist, representing various traditions, and medieval scrolls and codices may follow any of these or a unique practice. Maimonides ruled that a scribe should do his utmost to incorporate all of the elements of his own tradition; however, if they are omitted, whether in full or in part, the scroll is still kosher.

== Modern practice ==
Scribes no longer use tagin as exceptional marks on individual letters, but in modern parlance the term tagin has been reassigned to represent standard decorative serifs which form part of the torah font. These serifs are found on the letters shin, ayin, nun, Gimel, tsade, teth, and zayin, which the Talmud describes as having a shared three-stroke marking, and the letters beth, daleth, he, heth, yodh and qoph, which share a one-stroke marking. The term tagin can also be used for column embellishments or marks over the tetragrammaton.

== Interpretation ==
In a notable story in the Babylonian Talmud, God is seen "tying crowns to letters" at Mount Sinai, and Rabbi Akiva is said to be able to "derive Law from every thorn". In the Alphabet of Rabbi Akiva, a slightly different version of this story with explicit mention of the tagin: "Moses saw the planet of Rabbi Akiva in the curtain of God, that he was sitting and explaining the letters of the Torah, and that he would derive 365 meanings from each tag and each letter . . ."

In modern kabbalistic thought, each tag has special significance and meaning.

== See also ==
- Ktav Stam § Serifs (tagin)
