= Duchsustus =

Duchsustus (Hebrew: דוכסוסטוס, from Greek δυσχιστός dyschistos) is the name of a type of parchment used for religious writings in Judaism. It is originally a Greek word and one of three Talmudic names for animal skin. The other two are klaf and gevil. The meanings of these terms, however, are the subject of controversy in Jewish law.

According to the Talmud, a Torah scroll should, ideally, be written on gevil, but may also be on klaf; tefillin must be written on klaf; and mezuzot may be written on duchsustus, klaf, or gevil. Duchsustus is the animal's dermis, klaf is the epidermis, and gevil is both layers tanned and unseparated.

== Maimonides' prescriptions ==
There are halachic rules for the use of each of the three types of tanned skin. According to Maimonides, Torah scrolls must be written on gevil only on the side on which the hair had grown, and never on duchsustos (understood as the half-skin from the flesh side). Phylacteries, if written on klaf, must be written on the flesh side. A mezuzah, when written on duchsustos, must be written on the hair side. It is unacceptable to write on the hair side of klaf or on the flesh side of gevil and duchsustos.
