= Ashura (disambiguation) =

Ashura is the tenth day of Muharram in the Islamic calendar.

Ashura may also refer to:

- King Ashura, character from Tsubasa: Reservoir Chronicle
- Baron Ashura, a character from Mazinger Z
- Asura (Buddhism), or Ashura
- Ashura Hara, the stage name of Susumu Hara (1947–2015), a Japanese professional wrestler
- Ashura (film), a 2005 Japanese film
- Ashoura (missile), Iranian missile

== See also ==
- Achoura, a 2018 horror film
- Ahura, divine beings in Zoroastrianism
- Ashur (disambiguation)
- Achour (disambiguation)
- Asherah, ancient Semitic religion fertility goddess
- Ashure or Noah's Pudding, a dessert served on the 10th day of Islamic month of Muharram
- Asura (disambiguation), group of Hindu and Buddhist deities
- Asur (disambiguation)
