= Ktav Stam =

Jewish traditional writing

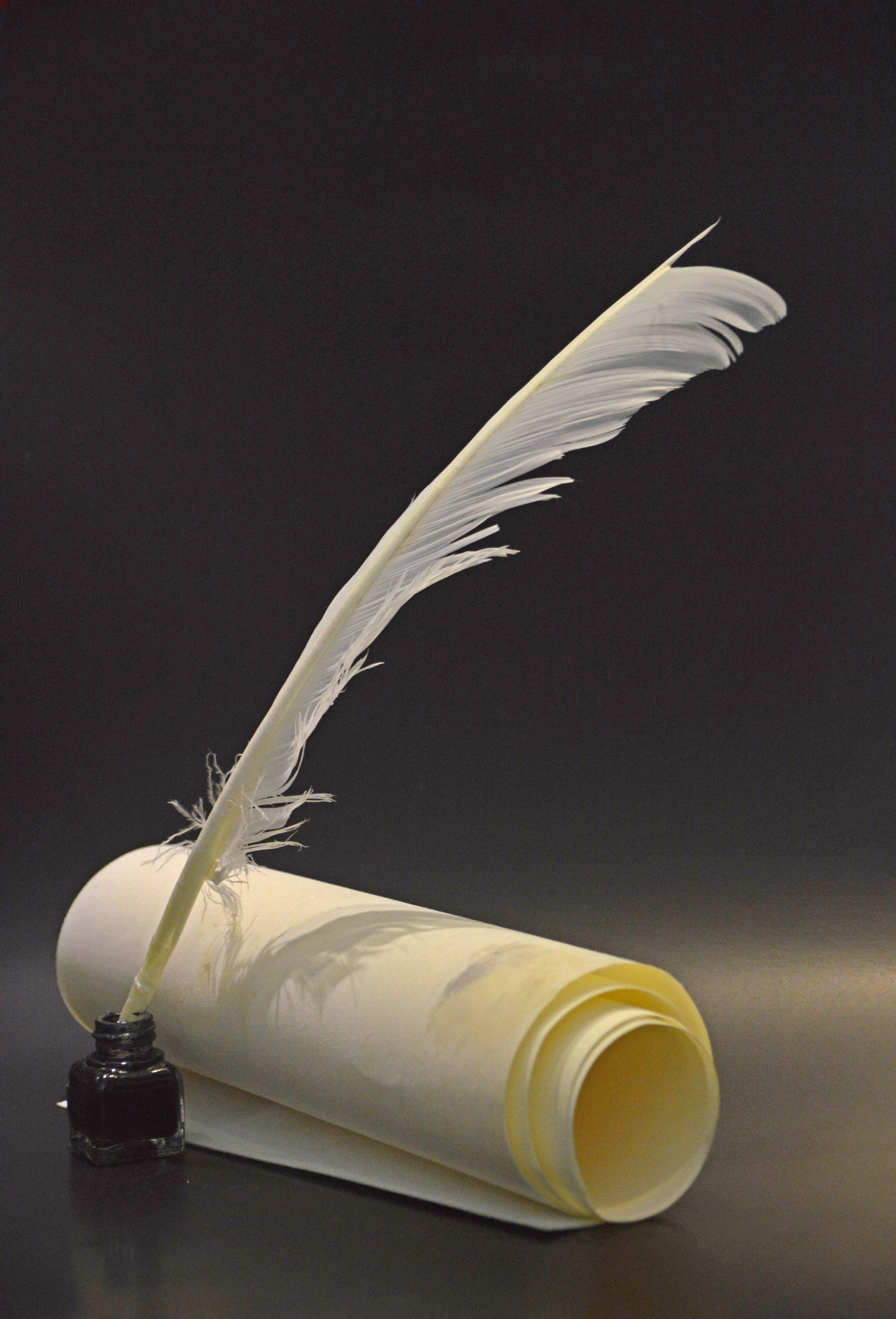
A Parchment, quill, and an ink used for Ktav Stam

Ktav Stam (Hebrew: כְּתַב־סְתָ״ם) is the specific Jewish traditional writing with which holy scrolls (Sifrei Kodesh), tefillin and mezuzot are written. Stam is a Hebrew acronym denoting these writings, as indicated by the gershayim (״) punctuation mark. One who writes such articles is called a sofer stam. The writing is done by means of a feather and ink (known as D'yo) onto special parchment called klaf. There exist two primary traditions in respect to the formation of the letters, Ktav HaAshkenazi and Ktav HaSefardi, but the differences between them are slight.

== Parchment ==
Klaf is the material on which a sofer writes certain Jewish liturgical and ritual documents, the kosher form of parchment or vellum. The writing material can be made of the specially prepared skin of a kosher animal – goat, cattle, or deer. The hide can consist of:

- Gevil (גוויל), the full, un-split hide;
- Klaf (קלף), the outer, hairy layer; or
- Duchsustus (דוכסוסטוס)

Only gevil and klaf can be used for holy writings. Duchsustus is not permitted. However, duchsustus is used for writing a mezuzah.

== Writing device (kulmus) ==
The kulmus (קולמוס) is the feather or reed used for the writing. The original source of the word stems from the Greek kalamos (κᾰ́λᾰμος), a mythological figure whose name means 'reed' or 'reed pen'. The feathers need to be obtained from a large bird; there is some debate as to whether it must be a kosher species. In modern times, the feathers of turkeys are most often used.

== Ink (deyo) ==
The special ink prepared for the writing is called d'yo (דיו). Maimonides wrote that the d'yo is prepared in the following way:

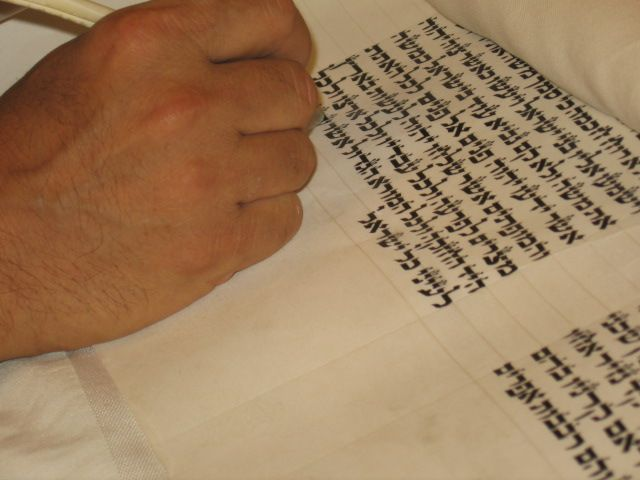
Ktav Stam

One collects the soot of oils, of tar, of wax, or the like, and kneads it together with sap from a tree and a drop of honey. It is moistened extensively, crushed until it is formed into flat cakes, dried, and then stored. When one desires to write with it, one soaks it in gallnut juice or the like and writes with it. Thus, if one attempts to rub it out, he would be able to. This is the ink with which it is most preferable to write scrolls, tefillin, and mezuzot. If however one wrote any of the three with gallnut juice or vitriol, which remains without being rubbed out, it is acceptable.

== Sirtut ==
Sirtut (שרטוט) are straight lines that the sofer must, by Torah law, etch into the klaf. The obligation primarily pertains to Sifrei Torah, Mezuza, and Meggila, however there are those who are similarly accustomed to placing sirtut on the Arba Parshiyot for tefillin. This helps the sofer write in neat straight lines.

== Spiritual attitude (ktiva lishma) ==
Every aspect of the process must be done lishma (לשמה), which is to say for its own sake with pure motives. The sofer must also be particularly concentrated upon the writing of any of the Divine Names. At many junctures in the process he is obligated to verbalize the fact that he is performing his action lishma.

== Form of the letters ==
The K'tav Ashuri is the only permissible Hebrew script, however over the centuries in Exile some minor variations have developed. The two primary traditions are Ktav HaAshkenazi and Ktav HaSefardi.

Ktav Ashkenazi is split into three categories:

- Ktav Bet Yosef – which is the standard Ashkenaz tradition.
- Ktav HaAri – which is the Hasidic tradition.
- Ktav Baal HaTanya - which is the Chabad Hasidic tradition.

Ktav Sefardi (also known as Vellish) – is the standard utilized by Mizrahi Jews, and Yemenite Jews.

== Serifs (tagin) ==
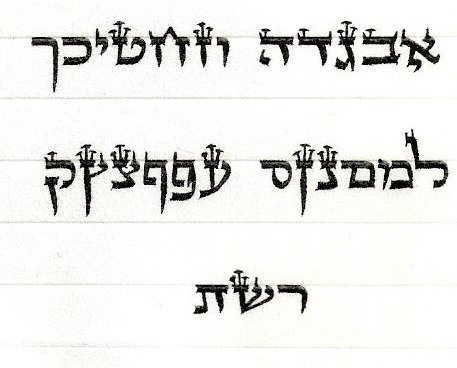
A sample of the Ashuri alphabet (כְּתָב אַשּׁוּרִי, ktav ashurí written, with tagin according to the Ashkenaz scribal custom on parchment (קָלַף klaf)

Tagin (or taggin; Hebrew and Aramaic: תגין, sing. תג, tag; also Hebrew: kether, כתר, pl. כתרים, k'tharim) are the distinct crown-like serifs affixed atop the letters. If the tagin are absent, the writing is not invalidated (according to most opinions). According to Rabbi Akiva in the Talmud, not only can one learn something from every letter in the Torah, but on can also learn something from the placement of the tagin. On the letters ג, ז, ט, נ, ע, צ, ש there are three tagin, on the letters ב, ד, ה, ח, י, ק there is one tag, and on the letters א, ו, כ, ל, מ, ס, פ, ר, ת there are none.

== Errors ==
Some errors are inevitable in the course of production. If the error involves a word other than a Divine Name, the mistaken letter may be removed from the scroll by scraping the letter off the scroll with a sharp object. If the Divine Name is written in error, the entire page, if written in a Torah, must be cut from the scroll and a new page added, and the page written anew from the beginning. The new page is sewn into the scroll to maintain continuity of the document. The old page is treated with appropriate respect, and is either buried, or stored away with respect rather than otherwise destroyed or discarded. In tefillin and mezuzot all the letters, the words and the parashot are required to be written in the order they appear in the Torah. Within any of the parashot if an error or an invalidated letter is discovered, or a missing letter was discovered after the completion of the writing, the rest of the document must be erased from the end all the way back to the error, to fix it, and write it anew.

If a sheet tears, if the tear is less than three lines-width and does not extend into the text, the scroll can still be read and if it extends into the text it can be sewn together. However, if it is more than three lines-width, it cannot be sewn together and a new sheet must be brought in to replace the old sheet.

== See also ==
- Torah scroll production
