= Aswang (disambiguation) =

Aswang is a mythical shapeshifting creature originating from Philippine folklore.

Aswang may also refer to:

- Aswang (1992 film); see List of Philippine films of the 1990s
- Aswang (1994 film), a horror film based on the mythical creature
- Aswang (2011 film), another film based on the mythical creature
- Aswang (2019 film), a documentary film on the Philippine drug war

== See also ==
- Aswan (disambiguation)
- Asura (disambiguation), etymon of aswang
- Suangi, in Papuan folklore
