= Achour Fenni =

Algerian academic and poet

Achour Fenni (Arabic: عاشور فني) is an Algerian poet, translator and academician, who has participated in several scientific, cultural and literary meetings in Algeria, North Africa, Europe, North America and South America.
