= Asuri metre =

Asuri is a metre of the Zend Avesta.

== Details ==
The Asuri metre is used in the Zend Avesta. They have been mentioned in the Yajurveda. Dr. Haug states:

"Among the metres used in the Yajurveda, we find several which are marked by the epithet Asuri, e.g., Gayatri Asuri, Ushni Asuri, and Pankti Asuri. These Asur metres are actually to be found in the Gatha literature of the Zend Avesta".

The Shukla Yajurveda mentions seven Asuri metres. The Asuri metres are embodied by the Gathas; such as the Gayatri asuri of 15 syllables in Ahunavaiti (Yas. XXXI,6; XXXI, 4), the Usnih asuri of 14 syllables in the Gatha Vohukhsathra (Yas. II); the Pankti asuri of 11 syllables in the Gathas Ustavaiti and Spenta-Mainyu.

Dr. Haug's research into the vedic and avestan metres found comparable similarities. For example the metre of Gatha Spentamainyu is Trishtubh while that of Ushtaviti Gatha is similar to vedic Trishtubh. The Ushtaviti Gatha exceeds the Trishtubh by only one pada of 11 syllables. The Yasna xxxi, verse 8 is nearest to Gayatri metre and Fargard xix to the Anushtubh. The metre of Homayasht is also near to Anushtubh.
