= Said Ashour =

- سعيد عبد الفتاح عاشور
- Born: July 30, 1922; Cairo, Kingdom of Egypt
- Died: September 10, 2009 (aged 87); Cairo, Egypt
- Awards: Chairmanship of the Society of Arab Historians (1991–2005)

Academic background
- Education: Fouad I University (BA 1944, MA 1949, PhD 1954)

Academic work
- Discipline: History, medieval history
- Doctoral students: Qasim Abduh Qasim
- Main interests: Crusades, Mamluk Sultanate, Medieval Europe
- Notable works: The Crusades Movement; Medieval Europe; Al-Naser Saladin

Said A. Ashour (Arabic: سعيد عبد الفتاح عاشور; July 30, 1922– September 10, 2009) was a professor of History at Cairo University. He authored some 22 books and published numerous papers and articles over his long career. Ashour was Chair of the Middle Ages section for many decades at the history departments of Cairo University, Beirut Arab University in Lebanon and Kuwait University. Ashour taught at Alexandria University and was a visiting professor in several universities throughout the Middle East.

Ashour was a long-serving chairman of the Society of Arab Historians, an academic institute encompassing membership from the entire Arab World and beyond.

== Education and academic background ==
Ashour completed his higher education at Cairo University (then known as Fouad I University). He earned a Bachelor of Arts in History in 1944, followed by a master's degree in 1949 with a thesis focusing on the relationship between Cyprus and the Crusader states. In 1954, he completed his Ph.D. in Medieval History under the supervision of Mohamed Mostafa Ziada, submitting a doctoral dissertation on Egyptian social history during the Mamluk Sultanate.

== Career ==
Ashour worked as a visiting professor at the University of Riyadh in 1961 for one year, the University of Algiers in 1973, the Beirut Arab University during the period from 1973 to 1975, and the Kuwait University from 1975 to 1985, and he also participated in the founding committee that planned to establish Sultan Qaboos University in Oman during the period From 1983 to 1985, and the University of Cambridge in the United Kingdom from 1985 to 1987, and during his stay there he visited a number of British universities such as the University of Oxford, the University of London and the University of Exeter, and in the latter, Abd al-Hayy Shaban invited him to visit the university and give his lectures there and to see its curricula in the study of history.
