= Omar Ashour =

British-Canadian academic

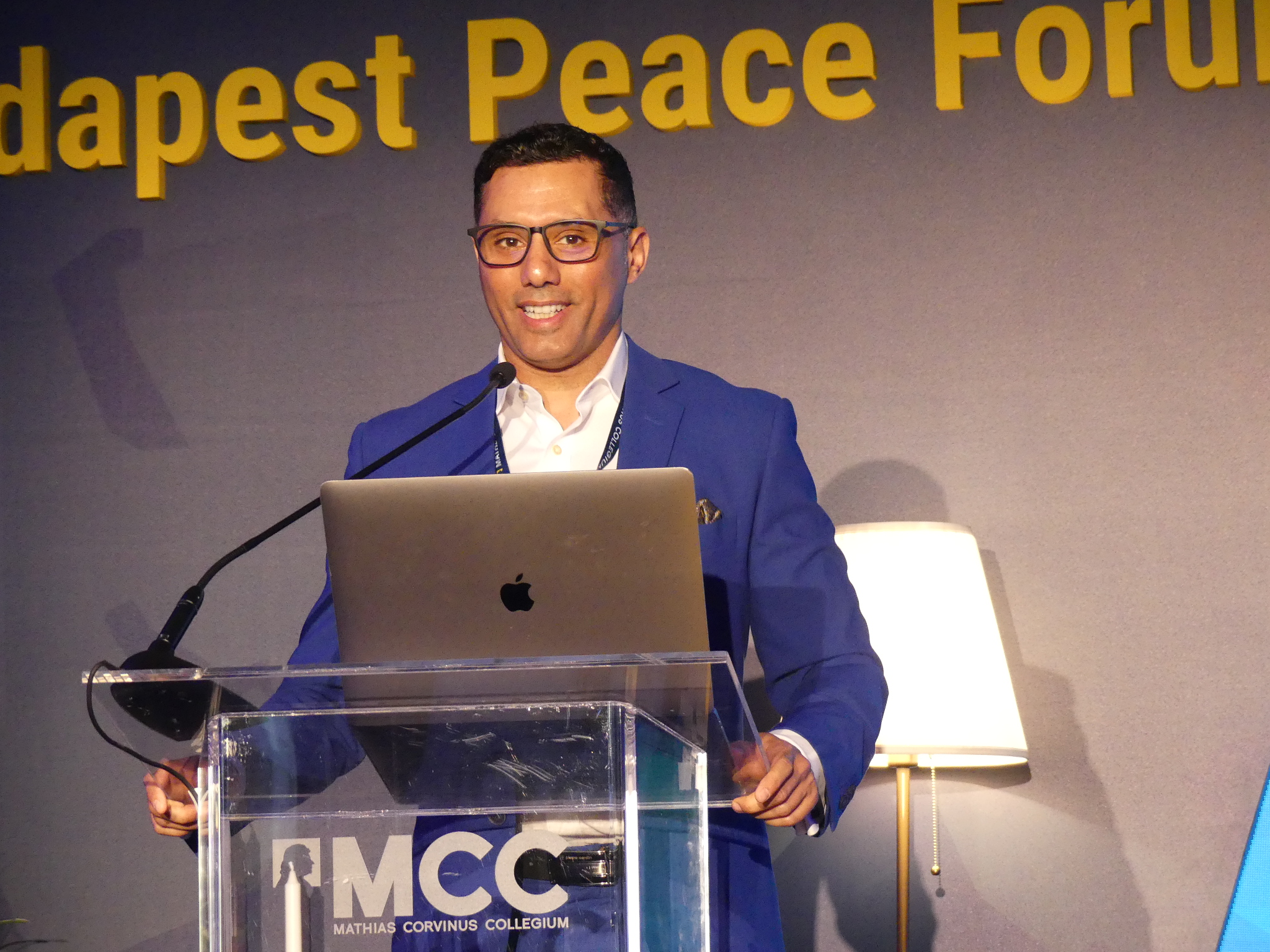
- Ashour in 2023
- Division: Bantam; featherweight; middleweight
- Style: Taekwondo; kickboxing; sanshou; karate
- Team: Egyptian National Taekwondo team Canadian National Karate Team

Academic work
- Discipline: Security and military studies
- Institutions: Doha Institute for Graduate Studies
- Main interests: Deradicalization
- Notable works: How ISIS Fights; The Deradicalization of Jihadists

Omar Ashour is a British-Canadian security and military studies academic and a former martial arts champion.

== Academic career ==
Dr Ashour obtained his PhD in Politics from McGill University (Canada). He was appointed Lecturer (Assistant Professor), subsequently promoted to Senior Lecturer (Associate Professor) in Security Studies and Middle East Politics, at the Institute of Arab & Islamic Studies at the University of Exeter (2008-2018), before being appointed Professor of Security and Military Studies and the Founding Chair of the Critical Security Studies Programme at the Doha Institute for Graduate Studies (Doha, Qatar).

He is the author of How ISIS Fights: Military Tactics in Iraq, Syria, Libya and Egypt (Edinburgh: Edinburgh University Press, 2021) and The Deradicalization of Jihadists: Transforming Armed Islamist Movements (London, New York: Routledge, 2009). Ashour has published about de-radicalization, counter-narratives, and transitions to democracy.

== Martial Arts ==
Ashour is a Taekwondo master and a kickboxer. He was a member of the Egyptian National Taekwondo team. His record includes a bronze medal in the World Junior Taekwondo Championship and a silver medal in Africa’s Taekwondo championship. He was the Egyptian national champion six times in the bantam and feather weight categories. He was also the two-times national champion in Chinese Kickboxing (Sanshou). In 2007, he joined the Canadian National Karate Team and won the Gold medal in the World Koshiki Karate Championship in the middle-weight category, defeating seven-times World Champion, Masamitsu Hisataka, via unanimous decision.
