= Asur, Thanjavur district =

Asur
- village
- Location in Tamil Nadu, India Asur (India)
- Coordinates: 10°59′18″N 79°22′43″E
- Country: India
- State: Tamil Nadu
- District: Thanjavur

Population (2001)
  - Total: 2,212

Languages
  - Official: Tamil
- Time zone: UTC+5:30 (IST)

Asur is a village in the Kumbakonam taluk of Thanjavur district, Tamil Nadu.

== Demographics ==
As per the 2001 census, Asur had a total population of 2212 with 1095 males and 1117 females. The sex ratio was 1020. The literacy rate was 67.47.
