= Achour Hasni =

Algerian handball player (born 1972)

Personal information
- Nationality: Algerian
- Born: 25 February 1972 (age 54)

Sport
- Sport: Handball
- Current club: Retired

Senior clubs
- Years: Team
- –2001: (Algeria) MC Alger
- 2001–2003: (Tunisia) Jendouba Sport
- 2003–??: (Algeria) MC Alger
National team
- Years: Team
- –: Algeria

Teams managed
- 2014–2015: Algeria (junior)

Achour Hasni (born 25 February 1972) is an Algerian handball player and coach. He competed in the men's tournament at the 1996 Summer Olympics.
