= Ashur-uballit =

Aššur-uballiṭ or Ashur-uballit (Neo-Assyrian Akkadian: 𒀸𒋩𒌑𒋾𒆷, lit. 'Ashur has kept alive') was an ancient Assyrian theophoric name that may refer to one of two Assyrian kings:

- Ashur-uballit I or Aššur-uballiṭ I, reigned between 1365 and 1330 BC, was the first king of the Middle Assyrian Empire
- Ashur-uballit II or Aššur-uballiṭ II, last king of the Neo-Assyrian Empire, succeeding Sin-shar-ishkun (623–612 BC)
