= Aswan Harmud =

Somaliland lawyer

- Other names: Jibril
- Citizenship: Somaliland
- Occupation: Lawyer
- Known for: first female prosecutor in Somaliland (2010)

Aswan Jibril Harmud is a Somaliland lawyer, and the first female Prosecutor in Somaliland.

In 2010, Harmud became the first female prosecutor in Somaliland.

This was made possible with the financial assistance of help of the United Nations Development Programme's legal scholarship and internship programme, where at least half the awards are given to women, and with which she was able to finish law school and an internship in the Somaliland Prosecutor's Office. Funding was provided by the European Union.

In 2014, Harmud was featured in the "Somali Voices" multimedia project created by the United Nations in Somalia.

In 2015, Harmud was one of over 75 women working in Somaliland's legal, against no more than five in 2008. According to Harmud, "I see this as a step forward for women, because we were looked down upon and people used to think we could not hold these positions".

Harmud has also said commented on the problems that such high-profile work has led to, "The women in the office have become targets. We don’t walk around town with our faces uncovered. We cover our faces – we do this out of fear."

== See also ==
- First women lawyers around the world
