= Ashur-dan =

Ashur-dan was the name of three kings of Assyria:

- Ashur-dan I, reigned c. 1178 to 1133 BC
- Ashur-dan II, reigned 934 to 912 BC
- Ashur-dan III, reigned 773 to 755 BC
