= Mouloud Achour (journalist, born 1980) =

French-Algerian journalist (born 1980)

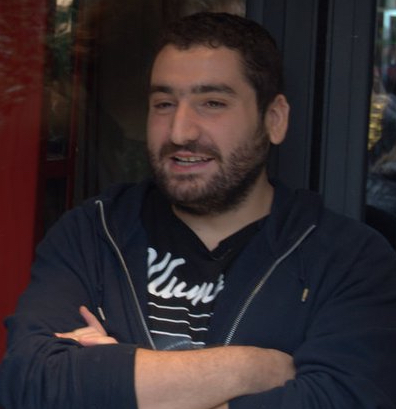
- Achour in 2011
- Born: 1 August 1980 (age 45); Montreuil, Seine-Saint-Denis, France
- Occupations: Journalist; television host; actor; director; screenwriter

Mouloud Achour (born 1 August 1980) is a French-Algerian journalist, television host, actor, director, and screenwriter. Achour was listed in 2019 as a Chevalier in the Ordre des Arts et des Lettres, a prestigious distinction awarded by the French Ministry of Culture.

== Personal life ==
Born in France, Achour is of Algerian descent.
