= Mouloud Achour (journalist, born 1944) =

Algerian writer (1944–2020)

- مولود عاشور
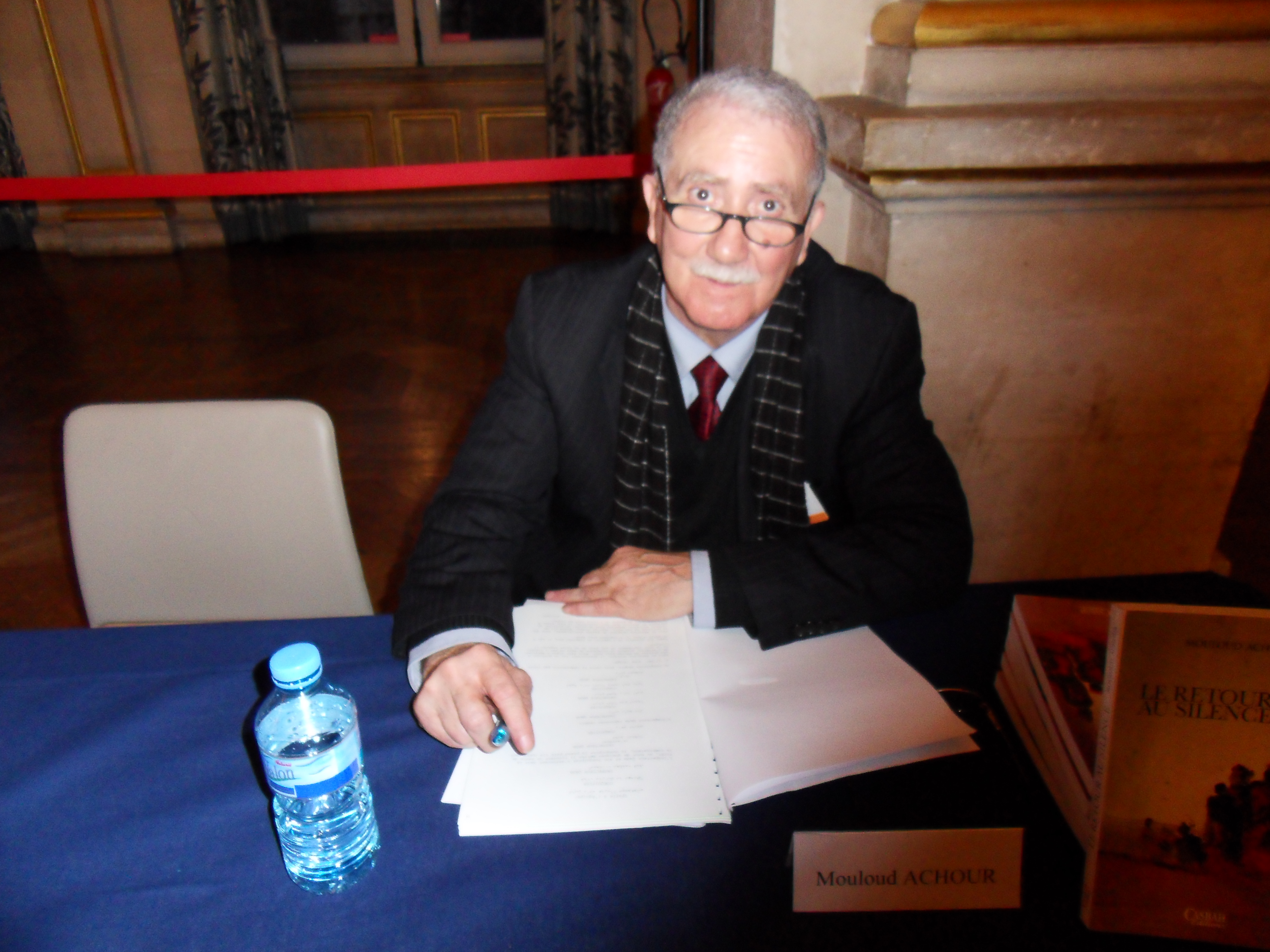
- Achour in 2012
- Born: 19 March 1944; Timizart, French Algeria
- Died: 24 December 2020 (aged 76)
- Occupations: Writer; Professor; Journalist

Mouloud Achour (Arabic: مولود عاشور) (19 March 1944 – 24 December 2020) was an Algerian writer, professor, and journalist.

== Biography ==
Achour served as a member and then chairman of the executive council of the Public Establishment of Television. He also directed the cabinet for the Ministry of Communications. He served as editorial director of Casbah Éditions in Algiers, and was responsible for overseeing books published in Algeria in 2003.

Mouloud Achour died on 24 December 2020, at the age of 76 from COVID-19.

== Publications ==
- Le Survivant et autres nouvelles (1971)
- Héliotropes (1973)
- Les Dernières Vendanges (1975)
- Jours de tourments (1983)
- Farès Boukhatem : rétrospective (1989)
- À perte de mots (1996)
- Algériens-Français : bientôt finis les enfantillages ? (2003)
- Le Vent du nord (2004)
- Juste derrière l'horizon (2005)
- Le Retour au silence (2011)
- Les dernières vendanges - Récit et nouvelles (2013)
- Un automne au soleil - Textes libres (2016)
