= Klaf =

Type of parchment

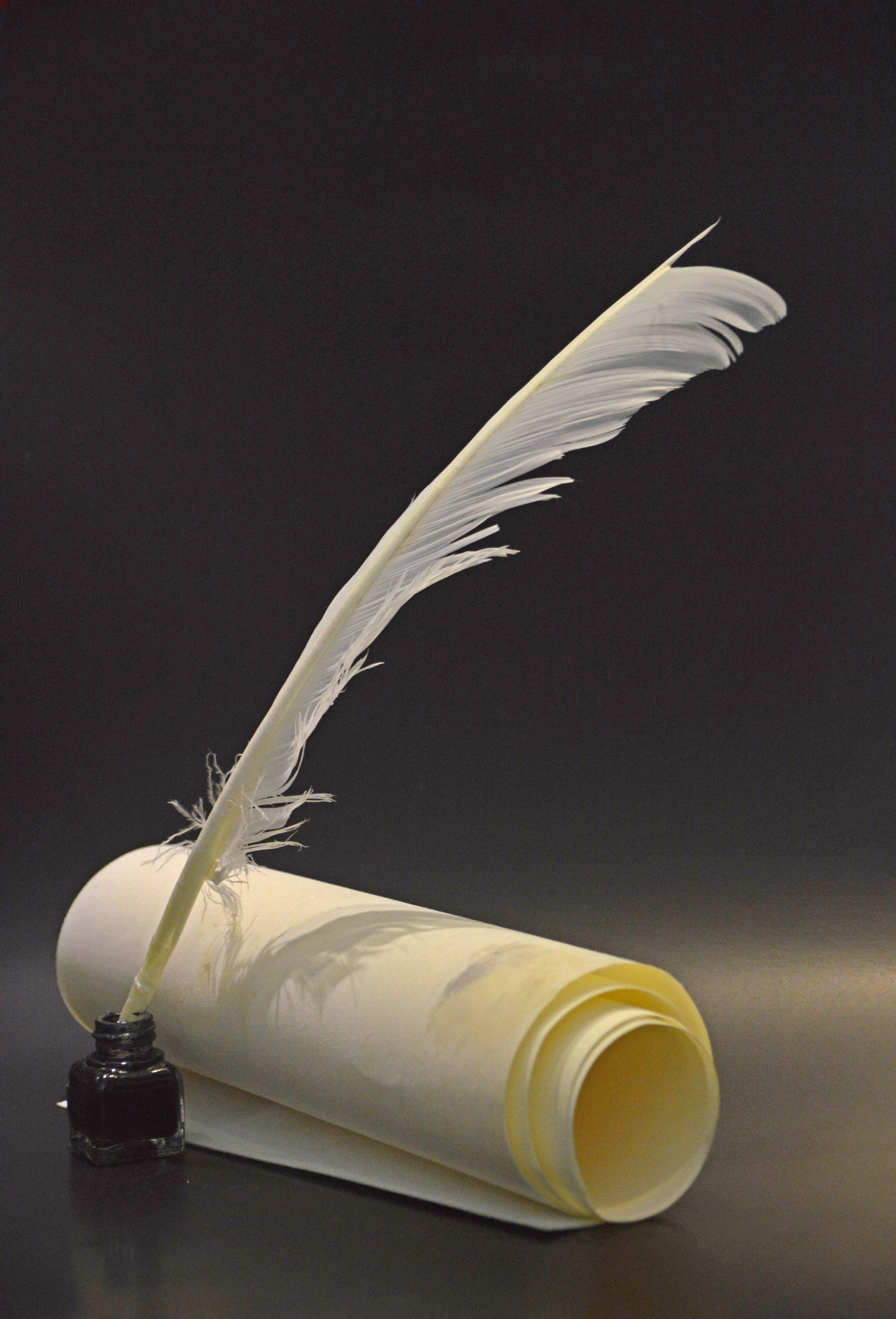
Klaf - a parchment with an ink and quill

Klaf or Qelaf (Hebrew: קְלָף) is the designation given a particular piece of skin. The Talmudic definition includes both the form of the skin and the way it is processed, in particular, that it must be tanned. Since the innovative ruling of Rabbeinu Tam (12th century Tosafist) it is primarily used to refer to parchment or vellum. It is one of the materials upon which a sofer writes certain Jewish liturgical and ritual documents.

== Description and rules ==
Klaf is a specially prepared, tanned, split skin of a kosher animal—goat, cattle, or deer. Rabbinic literature addresses three forms of tanned skin: gevil, consisting of the full, unsplit hide; and klaf and duchsustus, which are the split halves of the full hide. The rabbinic scholars are divided upon which is the inner and which is the outer of the two halves. Maimonides is of the opinion that klaf was the inner layer and that duchsustus was the outer layer. The "Shulchan Aruch" rules in the reverse that klaf was the outer layer and that duchsustus was the inner layer.

There are halachic rules for the use of each of the three types of skin. According to Maimonides, Torah scrolls must be written on g'vil only on the side on which the hair had grown, and never on duchsustos (understood as the half-skin from the flesh side). Phylacteries, if written on k'laf, must be written on the flesh side. A mezuzah, when written on duchsustos, must be written on the hair side. It is unacceptable to write on k'laf on the hair side or on the split skin (either g'vil or duchsustos) on the flesh side.

== Preparation ==
The legally required method of cleaning and preparing klaf has been altered over the centuries. During Talmudic times, salt water and barley (or flours) were sprinkled on the skins which were then soaked in the juice of afatzim (gall nuts, or oak apples, and other tannins). Nowadays, most processors dip the skins in clear water for two days and then soak them in limewater for nine days to remove the hair. When it is a hairless surface, the scribe stretches it on a wooden drying frame and scrapes it until it is dry. Creases are ironed out with presses. Then it is sanded until it becomes a flat, smooth sheet fit for writing. The reasons for the change in this process are lengthy and controversial. Today, a few Jewish scribes still prepare klaf in precise accordance with the Jewish Law.

Some parchment (usually poor quality) is smeared with log, a chalky substance, to make it whiter. Occasionally this is only done on the reverse. Some scribes object to the use of log as it forms a barrier between the ink and the parchment.

== Uses ==
In Talmudic times klaf was primarily used for tefillin and at times mezuzot. Since the 9th or 10th centuries it has become more widespread to write Torah scrolls on klaf; however, even today, there are still groups who continue to adhere to the ancient prescription described in the Talmud, and continue to write on gevil (full-grain leather).

Abraham ben Isaac of Narbonne, one of the Hachmei Provence (d. 1158), wrote the following account in his Questions & Responsa:

Our Torah scroll, even though it is not made in accordance with the halakha, since it is written upon klaf called [in Arabic] req (= parchment), which is neither treated with [barley]-flour nor tanned with tannins, they (i.e. the Jewish community at large) have already relied upon its use owing to the extenuating circumstances, for 'it is a time for God to act, [so as to avoid] their cancelling of Your Divine Law.' They are [obligated to] stand-up before it, and observe concerning it the sanctity prescribed for the Book of the Law (Torah), and it is forbidden to hold-on to it without the intermediate handkerchiefs.

== Intent ==
The parchment must be prepared "for the sake of use for the Divine act" and the processor must declare what he is preparing it for, as one cannot use klaf destined for a "lesser holiness". Specifically, the tanning process must be done with the explicit intent of use for the holiness of Torah, tefillin, or a mezuzah. The tanner does this by uttering at the outset of the tanning process "For the sake of the sanctity of a Torah scroll, tefillin, or mezuzah", which are of "weighty holiness". If necessary, the scribe should state that he is preparing for the sake of a Torah scroll but that he may change his mind if he wishes. Some Rabbinic scholars say that a non-Jew may prepare it; however, a Jew must stand over him, directing him in his work and stating verbally that the preparation is for the sake of heaven.

== Current production ==
Today there is a large amount of klaf processed under rabbinical supervision, and the variety, quality, and quantity are increasing.

== See also ==
- Ktav Stam
- Kulmus
- Leather in Judaism
