= Parchment =

Writing material made from animal skins

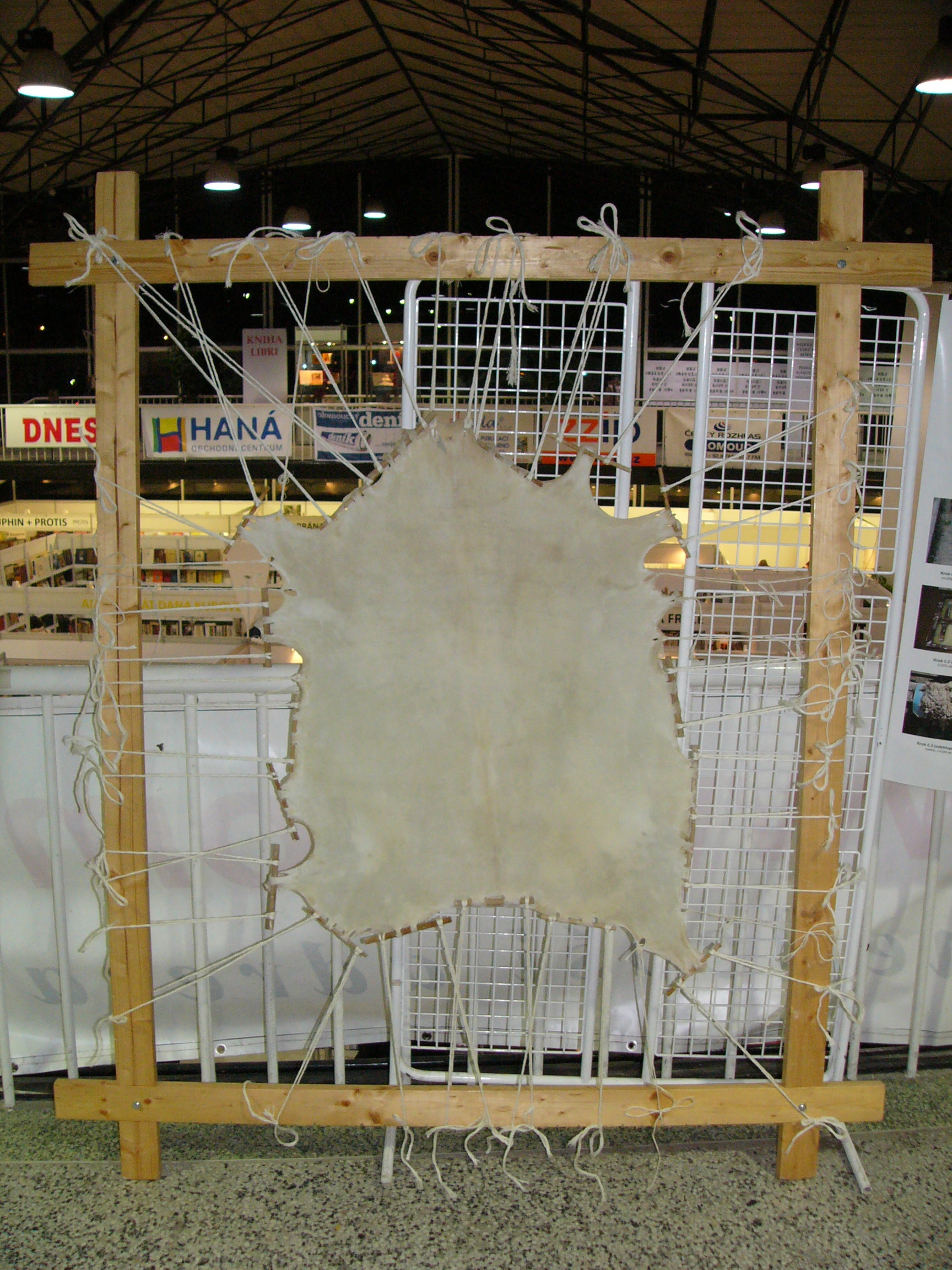
Central European (Northern) type of finished parchment made of goatskin stretched on a wooden frame

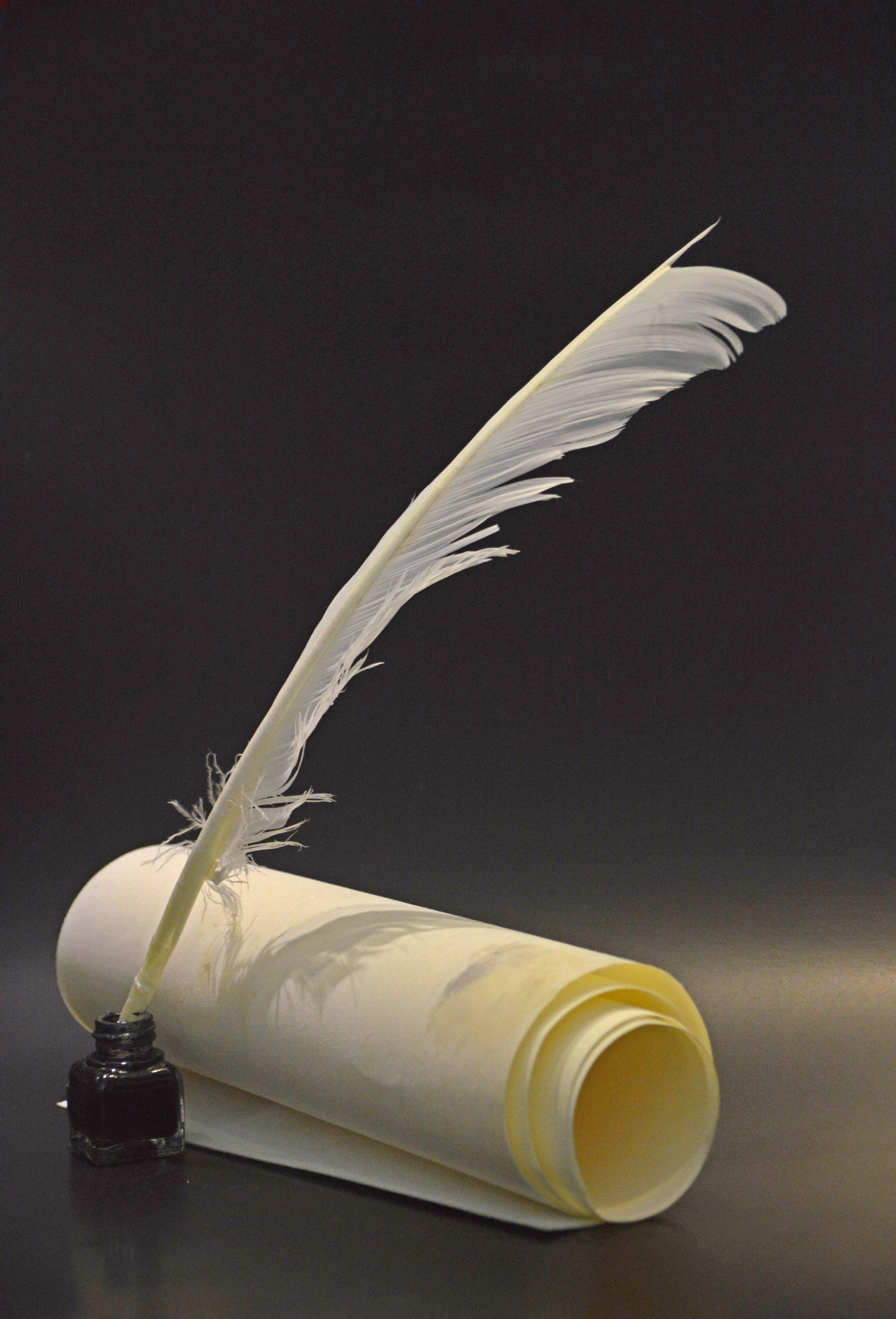
Parchment with a quill and ink

Parchment is a writing material made from specially prepared untanned skins of animals—primarily sheep, calves and goats. It has been used as a writing medium in West Asia and Europe for more than two millennia. By 400 AD many of the written works intended for preservation in these regions had been transferred from papyrus to parchment. Vellum is a type of fine-quality parchment made from the skins of calves.

The generic term animal membrane is sometimes used by libraries and museums that wish to avoid distinguishing between parchment and vellum.

== Parchment and vellum ==
Today the term parchment is often used in non-technical contexts to refer to any animal skin, particularly goat, sheep or cow, that has been scraped or dried under tension. The term originally referred only to the skin of sheep and, occasionally, goats. The equivalent material made from calfskin, which was of finer quality, was known as vellum (from the Old French velin or vellin, and ultimately from the Latin vitulus, meaning a calf); whilst the finest of all was uterine vellum. Many sources believed the starting material for the higher quality was taken from a calf foetus or stillborn calf. Modern research has provided evidence that this was not the case in samples of the 13th century parchment from pocket Bibles. Instead the authors hypothesize that the finer grade was actually the result of some now-lost technique and not fetal hides.

Some authorities have sought to observe these distinctions strictly: for example lexicographer Samuel Johnson in 1755 and master calligrapher Edward Johnston in 1906. However when old books and documents are encountered it may be difficult, without scientific analysis, to determine the precise animal origin of a skin, either in terms of its species or in terms of the animal's age. In practice therefore there has long been considerable blurring of the boundaries between the different terms. In 1519 William Horman wrote in his Vulgaria: "That stouffe that we wrytte upon, and is made of beestis skynnes, is somtyme called parchement, somtyme velem, somtyme abortyve, somtyme membraan." In Shakespeare's Hamlet (written c.1599–1602) the following exchange occurs:

Hamlet: "Is not parchment made of sheepskins?"
Horatio: "Ay, my lord, and of calves' skins too."

Lee Ustick, writing in 1936, commented:

To-day the distinction, among collectors of manuscripts, is that vellum is a highly refined form of skin, parchment a cruder form, usually thick, harsh, less highly polished than vellum, but with no distinction between skin of calf, or sheep, or of goat.

It is for these reasons that many modern conservators, librarians and archivists prefer to use either the broader term parchment or the neutral term animal membrane.

== History ==
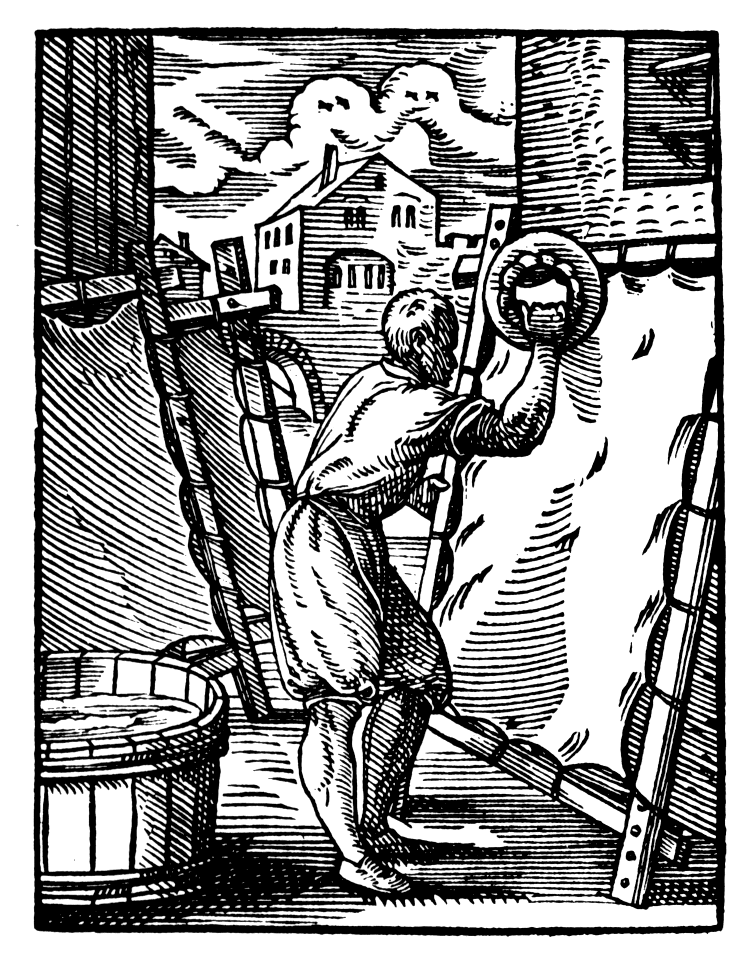
German parchmenter, 1568

The word parchment evolved (via the Latin pergamenum and the French parchemin) from the name of the city of Pergamon, which was a thriving center of parchment production during the Hellenistic period. The city so dominated the trade that a legend later arose that said that parchment had been invented in Pergamon to replace the use of papyrus, which had become monopolized by the rival city of Alexandria. This account, originating in the writings of Pliny the Elder (Natural History, Book XIII, 69–70), is almost assuredly false because parchment had been in use in Anatolia and elsewhere long before the rise of Pergamon.

Herodotus mentions writing on skins as common in his time, the 5th century BC; and in his Histories (v.58) he states that the Ionians of Asia Minor had been accustomed to give the name of skins (diphtherai) to books; this word was adapted by Hellenized Jews to describe scrolls. Writing on prepared animal skins had a long history in other cultures outside of the Greeks as well. David Diringer noted that "the first mention of Egyptian documents written on leather goes back to the Fourth Dynasty (c. 2550–2450 BC), but the earliest of such documents extant are: a fragmentary roll of leather of the Sixth Dynasty (c. 24th century BC), unrolled by Dr. H. Ibscher, and preserved in the Cairo Museum; a roll of the Twelfth Dynasty (c. 1990–1777 BC) now in Berlin; the mathematical text now in the British Museum (MS. 10250); and a document of the reign of Ramses II (early thirteenth century BC)." Civilizations such as the Assyrians and the Babylonians most commonly impressed their cuneiform on clay tablets, but they also wrote on parchment from the 6th century BC onward.

By the fourth century AD, in cultures that traditionally used papyrus for writing, parchment began to become the new standard for use in manufacturing important books, and most works which have been preserved were eventually moved from papyrus to parchment.

In the later Middle Ages, especially the 15th century, parchment was largely replaced by paper for most uses except luxury manuscripts, some of which were also on paper. New techniques in paper milling allowed it to be much cheaper than parchment; it was made of textile rags and of very high quality. Following the arrival of printing in the later fifteenth century AD, the supply of animal skins for parchment could not keep up with the demands of printers.

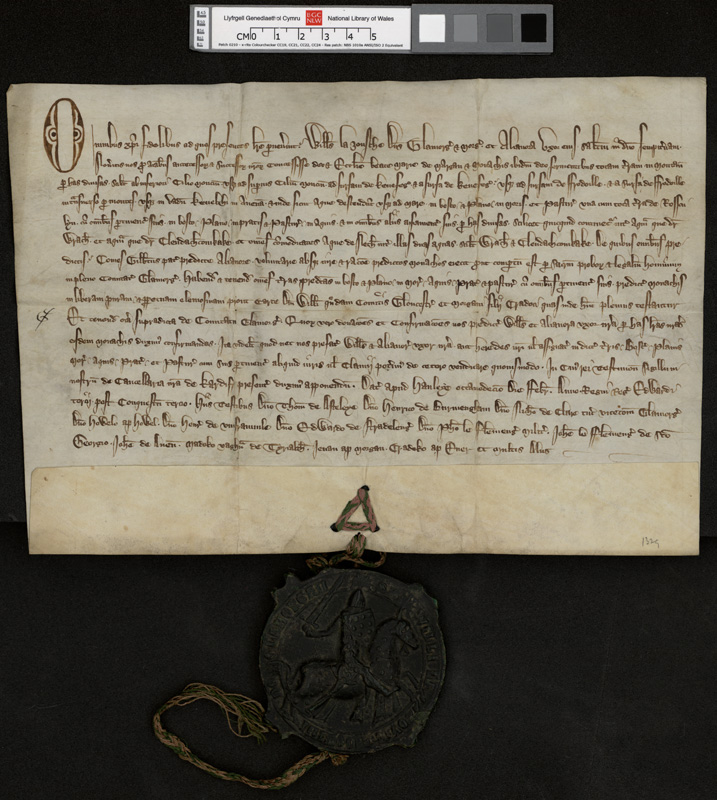
Latin grant dated 1329, written on fine parchment or vellum, with seal

There was a short period during the introduction of printing where parchment and paper were used at the same time, with parchment (in fact vellum) the more expensive luxury option, preferred by rich and conservative customers. Although most copies of the Gutenberg Bible are on paper, some were printed on parchment; 12 of the 48 surviving copies, with most incomplete. In 1490, Johannes Trithemius preferred the older methods, because "handwriting placed on parchment will be able to endure a thousand years. But how long will printing last, which is dependent on paper? For if ... it lasts for two hundred years that is a long time." In fact, high-quality paper from this period has survived 500 years or more very well, if kept in reasonable library conditions.

== Modern use ==
Parchment (or vellum) continues to be used for ritual or legal reasons. Rabbinic literature traditionally maintains that the institution of employing parchment made of animal hides for the writing of ritual objects, as detailed below. In the United Kingdom, until 2015 Acts of Parliament were printed on vellum, and it is still used for the covers of record copies of Acts.

The heyday of parchment use was during the medieval period, but there has been a growing revival of its use among artists since the late 20th century. Although parchment never stopped being used (primarily for governmental documents and diplomas) it had ceased to be a primary choice for artists' supports by the end of the 15th century Renaissance. This was partly due to its expense and partly due to its unusual working properties. Parchment consists mostly of collagen. When the water in paint media touches the parchment's surface, the collagen melts slightly, forming a raised bed for the paint, a quality highly prized by some artists.

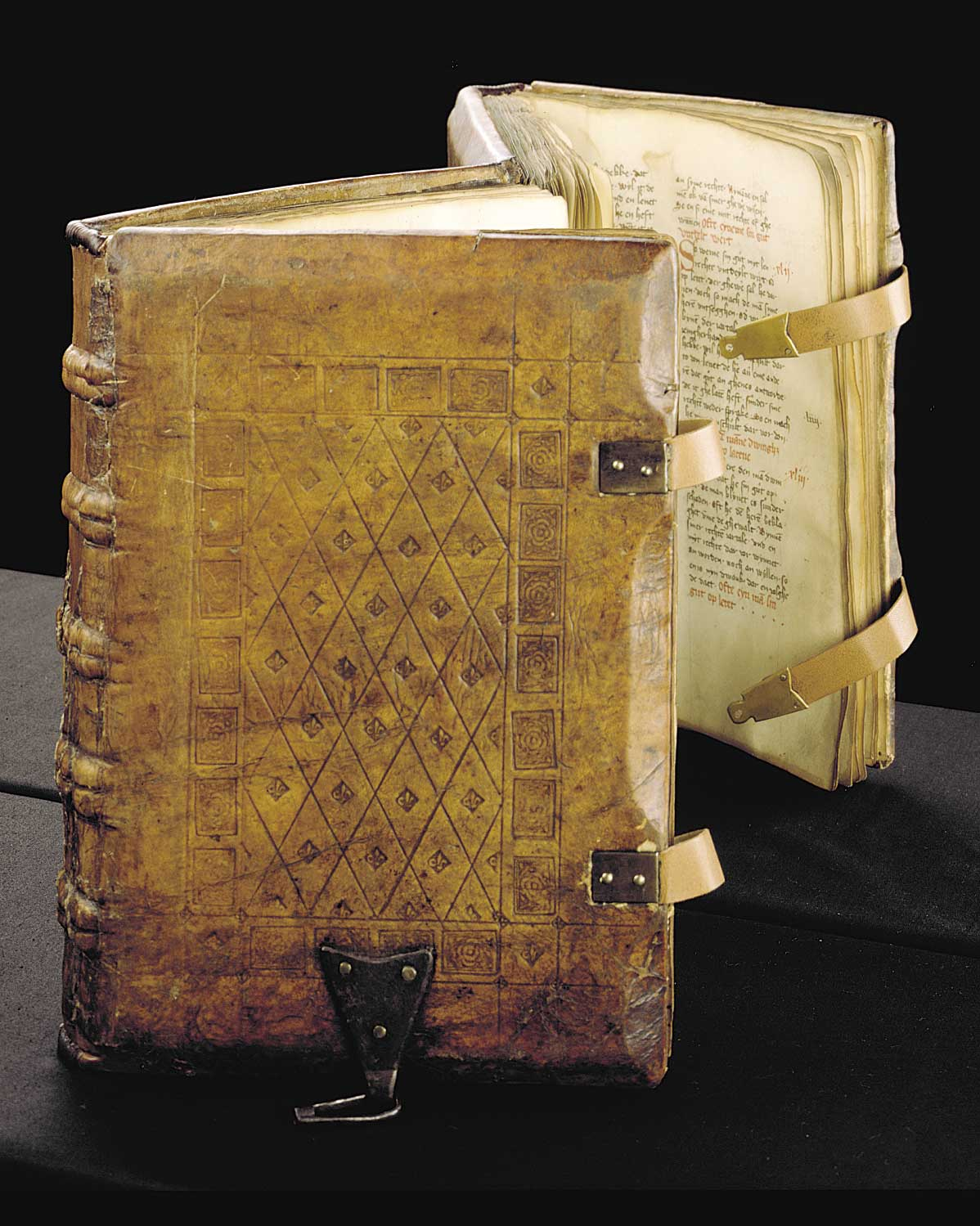
A 1385 copy of the Sachsenspiegel, a German legal code, written on parchment with straps and clasps on the binding

Parchment is also extremely affected by its environment and changes in humidity, which can cause buckling. Books with parchment pages were bound with strong wooden boards and clamped tightly shut by metal (often brass) clasps or leather straps; this acted to keep the pages pressed flat despite humidity changes. Such metal fittings continued to be found on books as decorative features even after the use of paper made them unnecessary.

== Manufacture ==
Parchment is prepared from pelt – i.e. wet, unhaired, and limed skin – by drying at ordinary temperatures under tension, most commonly on a wooden frame known as a stretching frame.

=== Skinning, soaking, and dehairing ===
After a carcass is skinned, the hide is soaked in water for about a day. This removes blood and grime and prepares the skin for a dehairing liquor. The dehairing liquor was originally made of rotted, or fermented, vegetable matter, like beer or other liquors, but by the Middle Ages a dehairing bath included lime. Today, the lime solution is occasionally sharpened by the use of sodium sulfide. The liquor bath would have been in wooden or stone vats and the hides stirred with a long wooden pole to avoid human contact with the alkaline solution. Sometimes the skins would stay in the dehairing bath for eight or more days depending on how concentrated and how warm the solution was kept – dehairing could take up to twice as long in winter. The vat was stirred two or three times a day to ensure the solution's deep and uniform penetration. Replacing the lime water bath also sped the process up. However, if the skins were soaked in the liquor too long, they would be weakened and not able to stand the stretching required for parchment.

=== Stretching ===
After soaking in water to make the skins workable, the skins were placed on a stretching frame. A simple frame with nails would work well in stretching the pelts. The skins could be attached by wrapping small, smooth rocks in the skins with rope or leather strips. Both sides would be left open to the air so they could be scraped with a sharp, semi-lunar knife to remove the last of the hair and get the skin to the right thickness. The skins, which were made almost entirely of collagen, would form a natural glue while drying and once taken off the frame they would keep their form. The stretching aligned the fibres to be more nearly parallel to the surface.

== Treatments ==
To make the parchment more aesthetically pleasing or more suitable for the scribes, special treatments were used. According to Reed there were a variety of these treatments. Rubbing pumice powder into the flesh side of parchment while it was still wet on the frame was used to make it smooth and to modify the surface to enable inks to penetrate more deeply. Powders and pastes of calcium compounds were also used to help remove grease so the ink would not run. To make the parchment smooth and white, thin pastes (starchgrain or staunchgrain) of lime, flour, egg whites and milk were rubbed into the skins.

Meliora di Curci in her paper, "The History and Technology of Parchment Making", notes that parchment was not always white. "Cennini, a 15th-century craftsman provides recipes to tint parchment a variety of colours including purple, indigo, green, red and peach." The Early medieval Codex Argenteus and Codex Vercellensis, the Stockholm Codex Aureus and the Codex Brixianus give a range of luxuriously produced manuscripts all on purple vellum, in imitation of Byzantine examples, like the Rossano Gospels, Sinope Gospels and the Vienna Genesis, which at least at one time are believed to have been reserved for Imperial commissions.

Many techniques for parchment repair exist, to restore creased, torn, or incomplete parchments.

=== Reuse ===
Between the seventh and the ninth centuries, many earlier parchment manuscripts were scrubbed and scoured to be ready for rewriting, and often the earlier writing can still be read. These recycled parchments are known as palimpsests.

== Jewish parchment ==
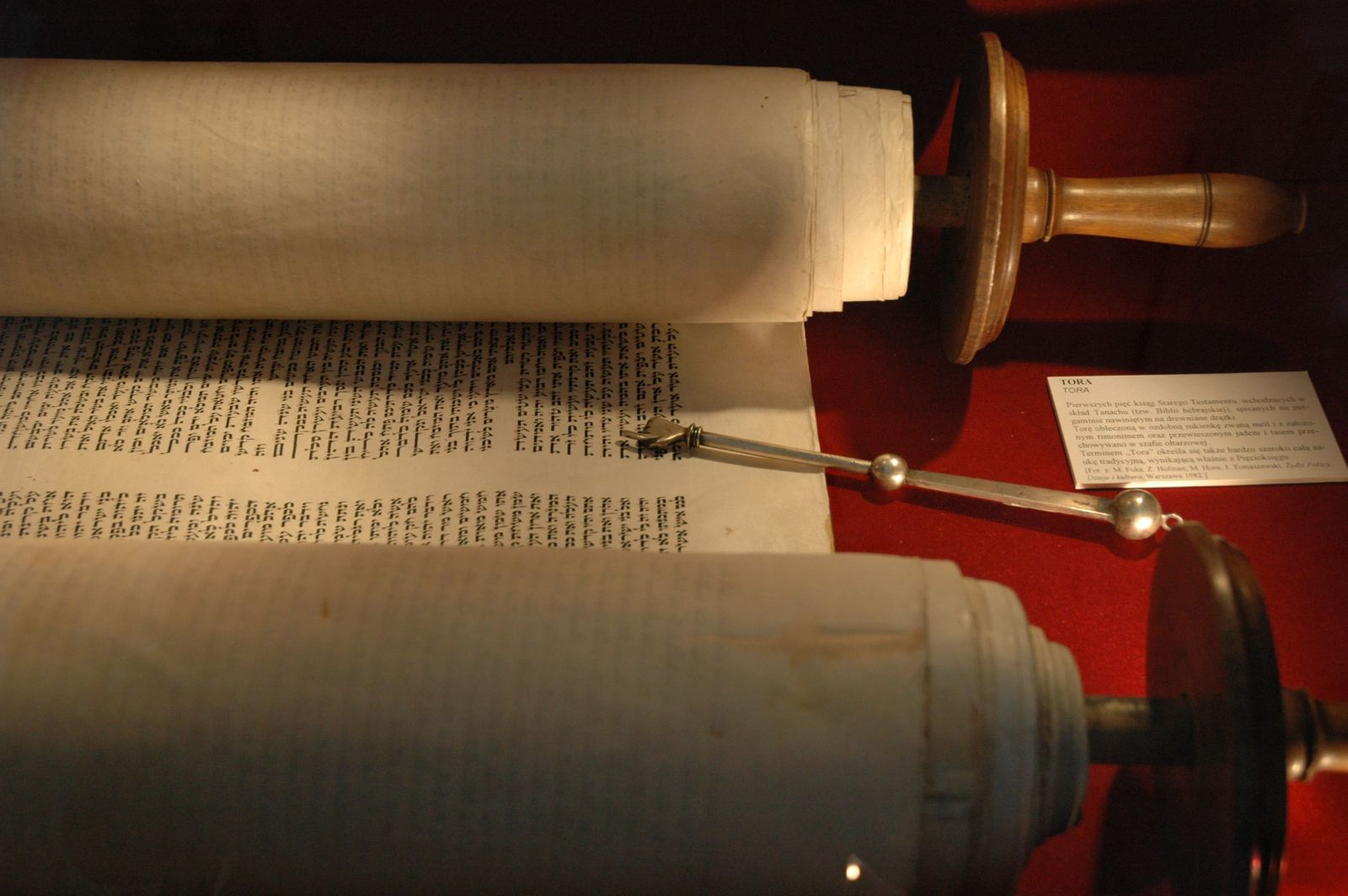
A Sefer Torah, the traditional form of the Hebrew Bible, is a scroll of parchment.

The way in which parchment was processed (from hide to parchment) has undergone a tremendous evolution based on time and location. Parchment and vellum are not the sole methods of preparing animal skins for writing. In the Babylonian Talmud (Bava Batra 14B), Moses is described as having written the first Torah Scroll on the unsplit cow-hide called gevil.

Parchment is still the only medium used by traditional religious Jews for Torah scrolls or tefillin and mezuzahs, and is produced by large companies in Israel. This usage is Sinaitic in origin, with special designations for different types of parchment such as gevil and klaf. For those uses, only hides of kosher animals are permitted. Since there are many requirements for it being fit for the religious use, the liming is usually processed under supervision of a qualified Rabbi.

A 2025 study of ritual texts from the Judaean Desert found a deliberate material distinction in its sample: 26 tefillin slips used exceptionally thin papillary-dermal splits, while eight mezuzah slips were written on the full dermis.

== Additional uses of the term ==
In some universities, the word parchment is still used to refer to the certificate (scroll) presented at graduation ceremonies, even though the modern document is printed on paper or thin card; although doctoral graduates may be given the option of having their scroll written by a calligrapher on vellum. Heriot-Watt University still uses goatskin parchment for their degrees.

=== Plant-based parchment ===
Vegetable (paper) parchment is made by passing a waterleaf (an unsized paper like blotters) made of pulp fibers into sulfuric acid. The sulfuric acid hydrolyses and solubilises the main natural organic polymer, cellulose, present in the pulp wood fibers. The paper web is then washed in water, which stops the hydrolysis of the cellulose and causes a kind of cellulose coating to form on the waterleaf. The final paper is dried. This coating is a natural non-porous cement, that gives to the vegetable parchment paper its resistance to grease and its semi-translucency.

Other processes can be used to obtain grease-resistant paper, such as waxing the paper or using fluorine-based chemicals. Highly beating the fibers gives an even more translucent paper with the same grease resistance. Silicone and other coatings may also be applied to the parchment. A silicone-coating treatment produces a cross-linked material with high density, stability and heat resistance and low surface tension which imparts good anti-stick or release properties. Chromium salts can also be used to impart moderate anti-stick properties.

== Parchment craft ==
Historians believe that parchment craft originated as an art form in Europe during the fifteenth or sixteenth centuries. Parchment craft at that time occurred principally in Catholic communities, where crafts persons created lace-like items such as devotional pictures and communion cards. The craft developed over time, with new techniques and refinements being added. Until the sixteenth century, parchment craft was a European art form. However, missionaries and other settlers relocated to South America, taking parchment craft with them. As before, the craft appeared largely among the Catholic communities. Often, young girls receiving their first communion received gifts of handmade parchment crafts.

Although the invention of the printing press led to a reduced interest in hand made cards and items, by the eighteenth century, people were regaining interest in detailed handwork. Parchment cards became larger in size and crafters began adding wavy borders and perforations. In the nineteenth century, influenced by French romanticism, parchment crafters began adding floral themes and cherubs and hand embossing.

Parchment craft today involves various techniques, including tracing a pattern with white or colored ink, embossing to create a raised effect, stippling, perforating, coloring and cutting. Parchment craft appears in hand made cards, as scrapbook embellishments, as bookmarks, lampshades, decorative small boxes, wall hangings and more.

== Technical analysis ==
The radiocarbon dating techniques that are used on papyrus can be applied to parchment as well. They do not date the age of the writing but the preparation of the parchment itself. While it is feasibly possible also to radiocarbon date certain kinds of ink, it is extremely difficult to do due to the fact that they are generally present on the text only in trace amounts, and it is hard to get a carbon sample of them without the carbon in the parchment contaminating it.

An article published in 2009 considered the possibilities of tracing the origin of medieval parchment manuscripts and codices through DNA analysis. The methodology would employ polymerase chain reaction to replicate a small DNA sample to a size sufficiently large for testing. The article discusses the use of DNA testing to estimate the age of the calf at the creation of the vellum parchment. A 2006 study revealed the genetic signature of several Greek manuscripts to have "goat-related sequences". Utilizing these techniques it may be able to determine whether related library materials were made from genetically related animals (perhaps from the same herd) and thus locate the vellum's origin.

In 2020, it was reported that the species of several of the animals used to provide parchment for the Dead Sea Scrolls could be identified, and the relationship between skins obtained from the same animal inferred. The breakthrough was made possible by the use of whole genome sequencing.

== See also ==
- Acid-free paper – Type of paper used for preservation
- Archival paper – Especially long-life, durable acid-free paper
- Bating (leather) – Former tanning industry process
- Conservation and restoration of parchment – Preservation of heritage collections
- Manuscript culture – Culture depending on handwritten manuscripts
