= Mezuzah =

Sacred parchment set in a decorative case used in Judaism

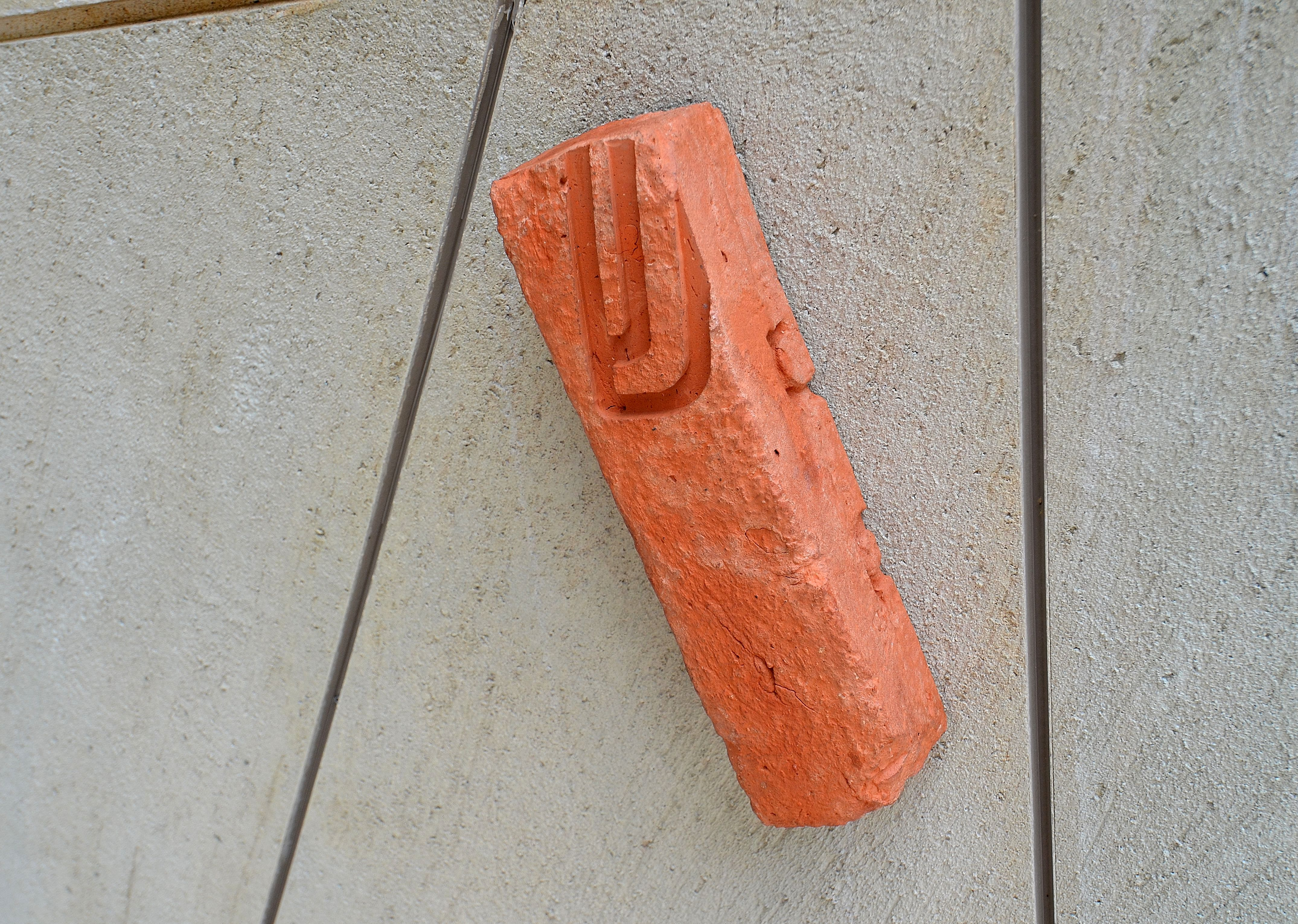
- Mezuzah at the entrance to POLIN Museum of the History of Polish Jews, which is inside a red decorative case

Halakhic texts relating to this article
- Torah: Deuteronomy 6:9 and Deuteronomy 11:20
- Mishnah: Menachot 3:7
- Babylonian Talmud: Shabbat 32a, Yoma 11a, Menachot 33a,
- Jerusalem Talmud: Megillah 4:12
- Mishneh Torah: Tefillin, Mezuzah, veSefer Torah ch. 5–6
- Shulchan Aruch: Yoreh De'ah 285–291

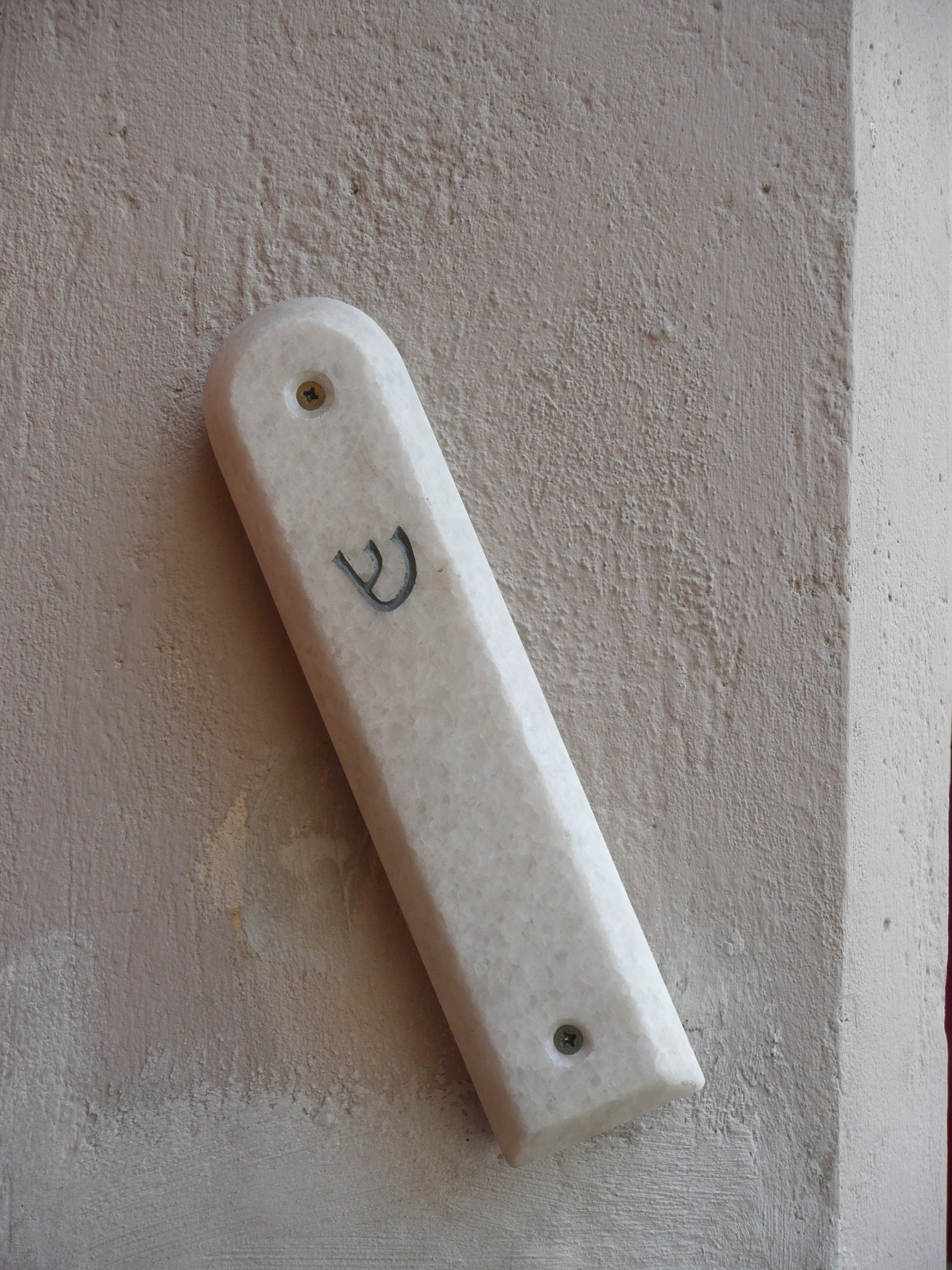
Ashkenazi mezuzah. The case is tilted and features the Hebrew letter ש (Shin).

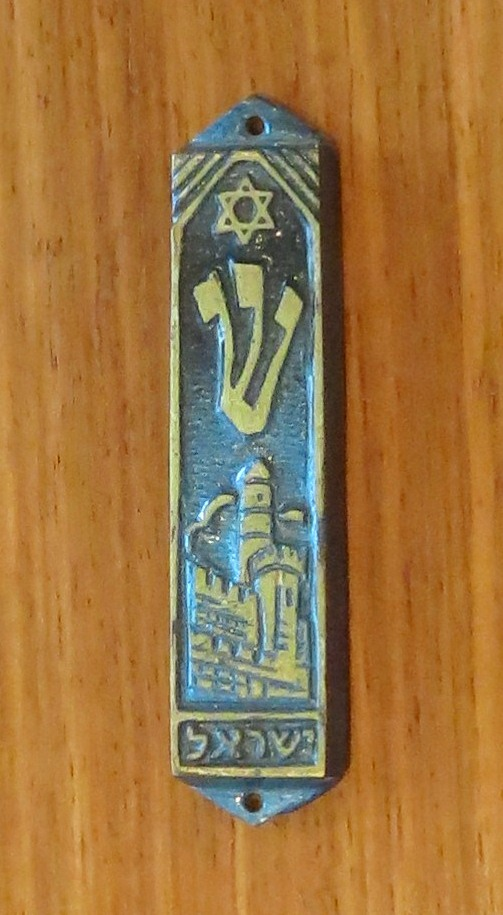
A Sephardic mezuzah. The mezuzah case is vertical and features the Hebrew letter ש (Shin).

A mezuzah (Hebrew: מְזוּזָה 'doorpost'; plural: מְזוּזוֹת mezuzot) is a piece of parchment inscribed with specific Hebrew verses from the Torah, which Jews affix in a small case to the doorposts of their homes. These verses are the Biblical passages in which the use of a mezuzah is commanded (Deuteronomy 6:4–9 and 11:13–21); they also form part of the Shema prayer.

According to traditional Jewish law, a mezuzah must be placed on every post-and-lintel entrance to a residence, courtyard, or city. Since the time of Rabbi Meir of Rothenburg (c. 1215–1293), religious Jews have increasingly also placed mezuzot on the entrances to non-residential buildings such as synagogues and offices, and on each internal doorway of the home or building, with the exception of bathrooms (where the name of God is forbidden) and small closets.

The klaf is prepared by a qualified scribe (sofer stam) who has undergone training, both in studying the relevant religious laws and in the calligraphic art of Ktav Stam. The verses are written in indelible black ink with a special quill pen made either from a feather or, now quite rare, a reed. The klaf is then rolled up and placed inside the case.

== Etymology ==
In the Bible, the word mezuzah only refers to the two 'doorposts' or 'doorjambs' of a door, the upright posts on either side of it which support the lintel, and appears in various contexts unrelated to any religious commandment or parchment. The word later acquired the modern meaning of piece of parchment in post-Biblical Hebrew due to the Deuteronomy commandment above requiring to write verses on doorposts.

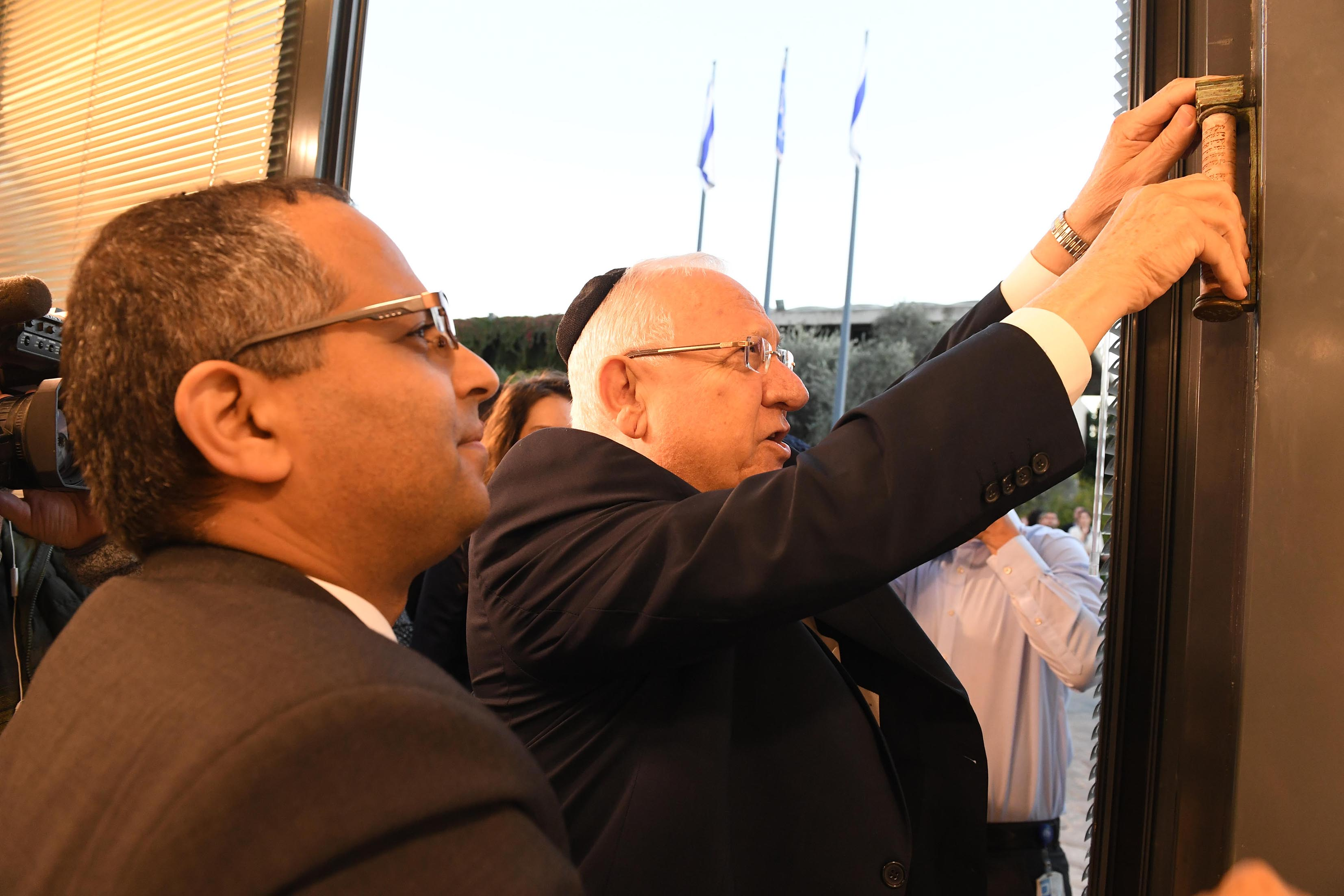
Then-president of Israel Reuven Rivlin putting up a mezuzah at Beit HaNassi, 2017

The word's origin is disputed:

- one accepted understanding derives mezuzah from the root zwz (ז-ו-ז) meaning 'motion' or 'shift' (Hebrew: זָז, romanized: zāz, lit. 'to move, deviate, shift'), describing a doorpost as the device enabling the door to move or shift. The root is unused in the Bible but is common in post-Biblical Hebrew and Aramaic, and is considered to have existed in the language then.
- another accepted understanding derives mezuzah from the Akkadian word mazzāzu 'stand' (like the socle or plinth of a column or stele), from the Akkadian verb izuzzu 'to stand', describing a doorpost as the socle or stand of the entrance, as opposed to the moving part, the door which revolves – a description similar to its corresponding Greek translation σταθμός in the Septuagint, which in addition to 'doorpost' generally means 'something fixed, something standing' from ἵστημι 'to stand'. However, there is no example of Akkadian mazzazu specifically meaning doorpost and some researchers doubt that Hebrew mezuzah borrowed this word.

== Purpose ==
In the biblical verses where the mezuzah command is found, the purpose is educational, to constantly remind a person of God's commandments:

And these words that I command you today shall be on your heart. You shall teach them diligently to your children, and shall talk of them when you sit in your house, and when you walk by the way, and when you lie down, and when you rise. You shall bind them as a sign on your hand, and they shall be as frontlets between your eyes. You shall write them on the doorposts of your house and on your gates.

In later generations, though, the mezuzah began to be interpreted as an apotropaic device, protecting the house from forces of evil. A culture-comparative analysis suggests that the objects placed on domestic thresholds often bear the function of an amulet repelling the broadly understood evil. Some early Rabbinic sources (including JT Megillah 4:12, BT Bava Metziya 102a, and BT Pesahim 113b) explicitly witness the belief in the anti-demonic function of mezuzot. While some Jewish sources indicate that mezuzah is construed as a device protecting against divine anger, others vehemently reject such an interpretation.

The belief in the protective power of mezuzah is prevalent in modern times as well. In the 1970s, after a series of terrorist attacks in Ma'alot, the representatives of Chabad started the campaign for the systematic checking of mezuzahs. The general assumption underlying the action was that adhering to the mitzvot would guarantee personal safety.

According to various pieces of sociological research, approximately three-quarters of adults in Israel believe the mezuzah guards their houses.

== Design ==
The mezuzah must be written on parchment (klaf) by a specially trained scribe (sofer).

=== Additional inscriptions ===
It is customary to write two inscriptions on the back of the parchment:

- the Hebrew word שדי (Shaddai)
- the phrase "כוזו במוכסז כוזו"

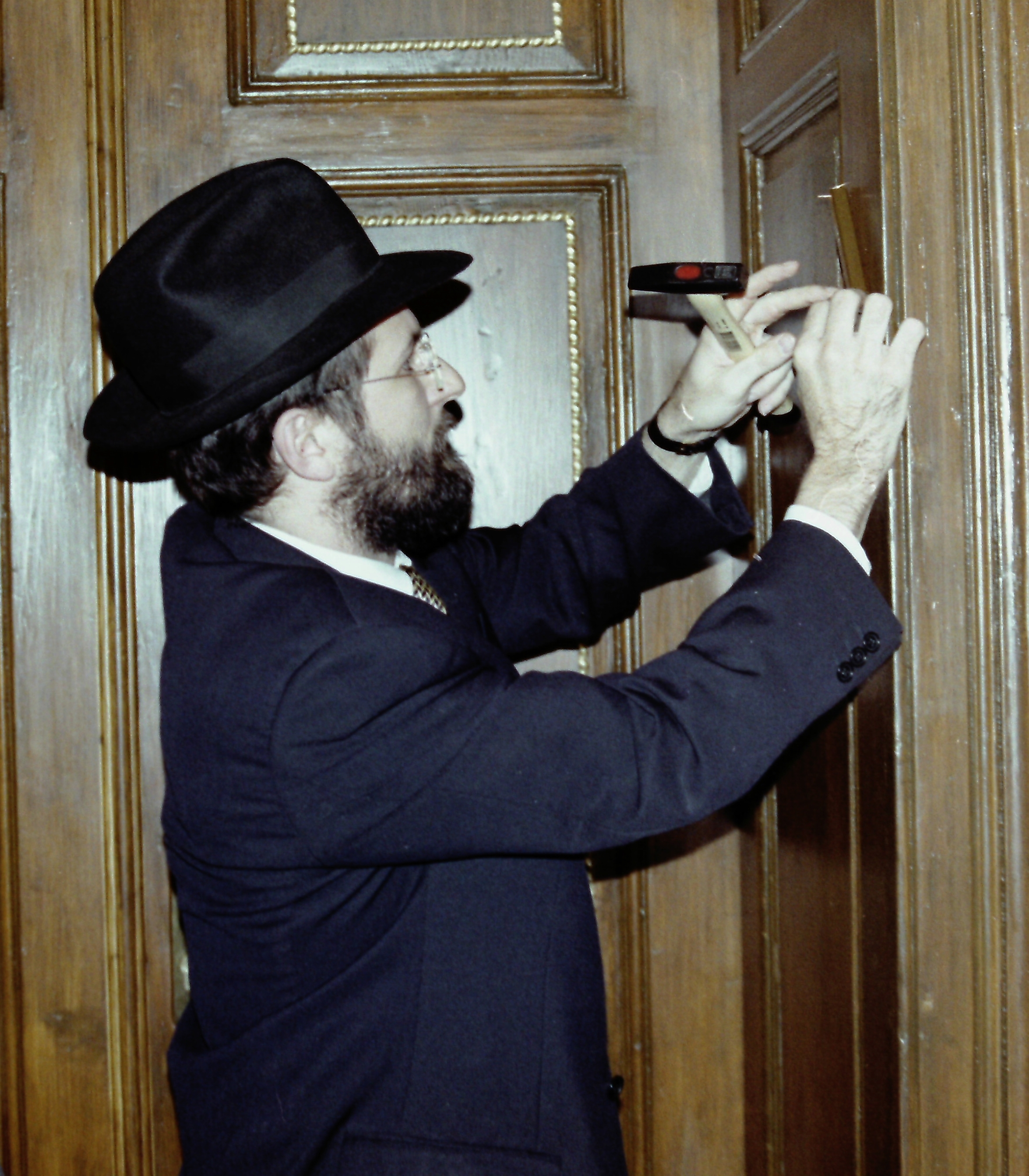
Kraków rabbi Sacha Pecaric hammering a mezuza on the entrance of a prayer room in Bielsko-Biała, 1999

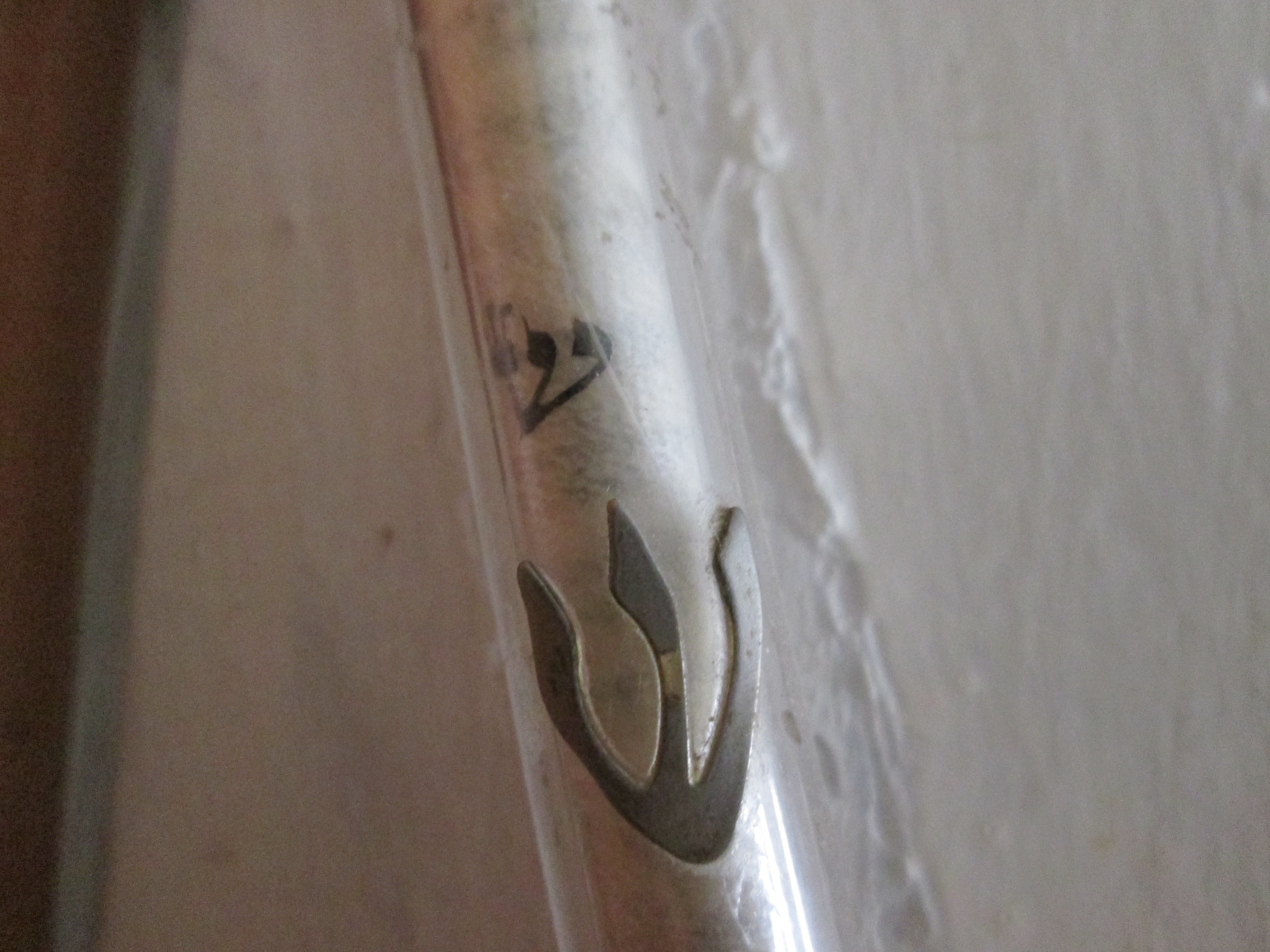
Clear mezuzah case in Jerusalem

Shaddai, ["Almighty"] one of the biblical names of God, also serves here as an acronym for Shomer Daltot Yisrael, "Guardian of Israel's doors". Many mezuzah cases are also marked with the Hebrew letter ש (Shin), for Shaddai.

"כוזו במוכסז כוזו" is a Caesar cipher—a one-letter shift—of the third, fourth, and fifth words of the Shema, "Adonai, Eloheinu, Adonai", "The Lord, our God, the Lord"; it is written on the back of the case, opposite the corresponding words on the front. This inscription dates from the 11th century and is found among the Hasidei Ashkenaz (medieval German Jewish mystics).

The Sephardic custom (minhag) leaves out the phrase "כוזו במוכסז כוזו", and only the Hebrew word שדי (Shaddai) is written on the back of the mezuzah. This follows the Shulchan Aruch and the writings of the Rambam. The Ashkenazi custom of writing both phrases, however, was supported in the writings of the Remo. (Yoreh De'ah 288:15)

In this regard it is worthwhile to refer to the often cited passage from Rambam's Mishneh Torah which states:

It is a common custom to write [God's name,] Shaddai, on the outside of a mezuzah opposite the empty space left between the two passages. There is no difficulty in this, since [the addition is made] outside. Those, however, who write the names of angels, other sacred names, verses, or forms, on the inside [of a mezuzah] are among those who do not have a portion in the world to come. Not only do these fools nullify the mitzvah, but furthermore, they make from a great mitzvah [which reflects] the unity of the name of the Holy One, blessed be He, the love of Him, and the service of Him, a talisman for their own benefit. They, in their foolish conception, think that this will help them regarding the vanities of the world.

A 2025 analysis of eight ancient mezuzah slips from the Judaean Desert found that each was written on the full dermis, unlike the exceptionally thin split skins used for the ancient tefillin slips examined in the same study.

=== Mezuzah cases ===
While the most important part of the mezuzah is the klaf, or the parchment, and not the case, designing and producing mezuzah cases has been elevated to an art form over the ages. Mezuzah cases are produced from a wide variety of materials, from silver and precious metals, to wood, stone, ceramics, pewter, and even polymer clay. Some dealers of mezuzah cases will provide or offer for sale a copy of the text that has been photocopied onto paper; this is not a kosher (valid) mezuzah, which must be handwritten onto a piece of parchment by a qualified scribe. Other Judaica sellers work directly with professional scribes to offer kosher scrolls together with the purchase of an artistic mezuzah case.

== Practices ==
=== Affixing the mezuzah ===
==== Position and integrity ====
According to halakha, the mezuzah should be placed on the right side of the door or doorpost, in the upper third of the doorpost (i.e., approximately shoulder height), within approximately 3 inches (8 cm) of the doorway opening. Care should be taken to not tear or damage the parchment or the wording on it, as this will invalidate the mezuzah.

==== Angle ====
Mezuzah affixed to a door frame in Philadelphia, Pennsylvania, U.S.

Where the doorway is wide enough, many Ashkenazi Jews tilt the mezuzah so that the top slants toward the room into which the door opens. This is done to accommodate the variant opinions of Rashi (1040–1105) and of his grandson, Rabbeinu Tam, as to whether it should be placed vertically (Rashi) or horizontally (Rabbeinu Tam), and also to imply that God and the Torah (which the mezuzah symbolizes) are entering the room. The compromise solution was suggested by Rabbi Jacob ben Asher (c. 1269 – c. 1343).

Most Sephardi Jews, Mizrahi Jews and other non-Ashkenazi Jews affix the mezuzah vertically, though Spanish and Portuguese Jews living in countries where the majority of Jews are Ashkenazim usually place it slanting.

==== Time ====
Generally, halakha requires Jews living in the diaspora (i.e., outside of the Land of Israel) to affix a mezuzah within 30 days of moving into a rented house or apartment. For a purchased home or apartment in the diaspora, or a residence in Israel (owned or rented), the mezuzah is affixed immediately upon moving in. The reason for this difference is that there is an assumption that when a Jew lives in Israel, Israel shall remain their permanent residence, whereas a home in the diaspora is temporary.

==== Blessing ====
The procedure is to hold the mezuzah against the spot upon which it will be affixed, then recite a blessing:

בָּרוּךְ אַתָּה יי אֱלֹהֵינוּ מֶלֶךְ הָעוֹלָם, אֲשֶׁר קִדְּשַׁנוּ בְּמִצְו‌ֹתָיו וְצִוָּנוּ לִקְבּוֹעַ מְזוּזָה
Barukh atah Adonai Eloheinu melekh ha‘olam, asher qideshanu bemitzvotav vetzivanu liqboa‘ mezuzah.
Blessed are You, Lord our God, King of the Universe, Who sanctified us with His mitzvot, and commanded us to affix a mezuzah.

Any Jew can recite the blessing, provided they are old enough to understand the significance of the mitzvah. After the blessing, the mezuzah is attached.

When affixing several mezuzot, it is sufficient to recite the blessing once, before affixing the first one.

=== Touching the mezuzah ===
Whenever passing through the doorway, many people touch a finger to the mezuzah as a way of showing respect to God. Many people also kiss their finger after touching it to the mezuzah.

=== Checking the parchment ===
Many observant Jews from all Jewish denominations have a qualified scribe check the mezuzot parchments for defects (such as small tears or faded lettering) at least twice every seven years. This job can be done by a sofer (scribe) or by anyone with similar training. A sofer also can make new mezuzot parchments which are in accordance with Jewish law.

== Karaite and Samaritan mezuzah ==
This article deals mainly with the mezuzah as it is used in Rabbinic Judaism, but Karaite Judaism and Samaritanism have their own traditions.

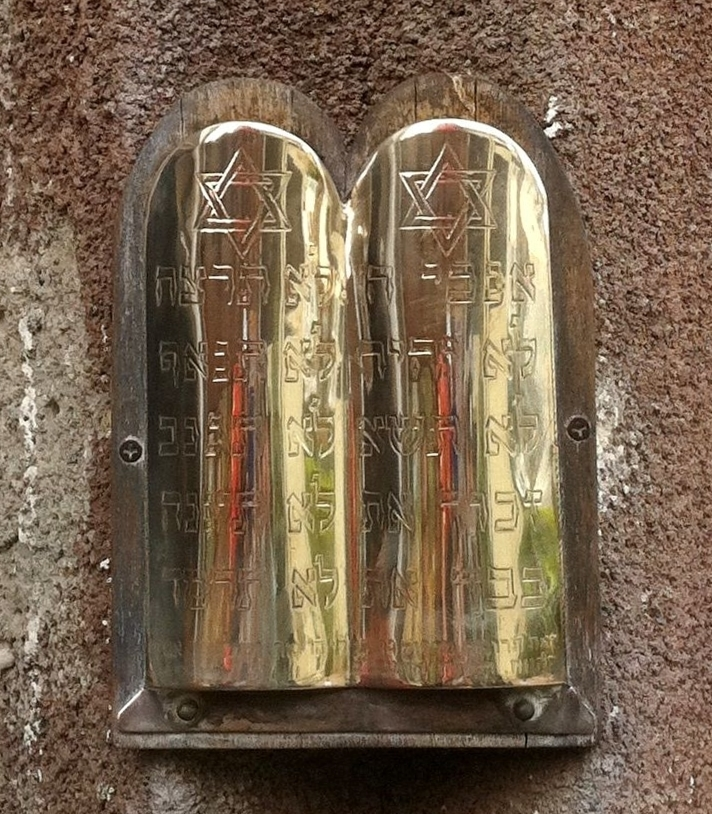
Golden Tablets of Stone plaque, outside the Universal Karaite Judaism center in Ramla

In Karaite Judaism the Deuteronomic verse "And you shall write them on the doorposts of your houses and your gates" (Deuteronomy 6:9; 11:20) is interpreted to be a metaphor and not as referring to the Rabbanite mezuzah. Thus Karaites do not traditionally use mezuzot, but put up a small plaque in the shape of the two Tablets of the Law with the Ten Commandments. In Israel, where they might try not to make other Jews feel uncomfortable, many Karaites make an exception and place a mezuzah on their doorpost as well. The Karaite version of the mezuzah is fixed to the doorways of public buildings and sometimes to private buildings, too.

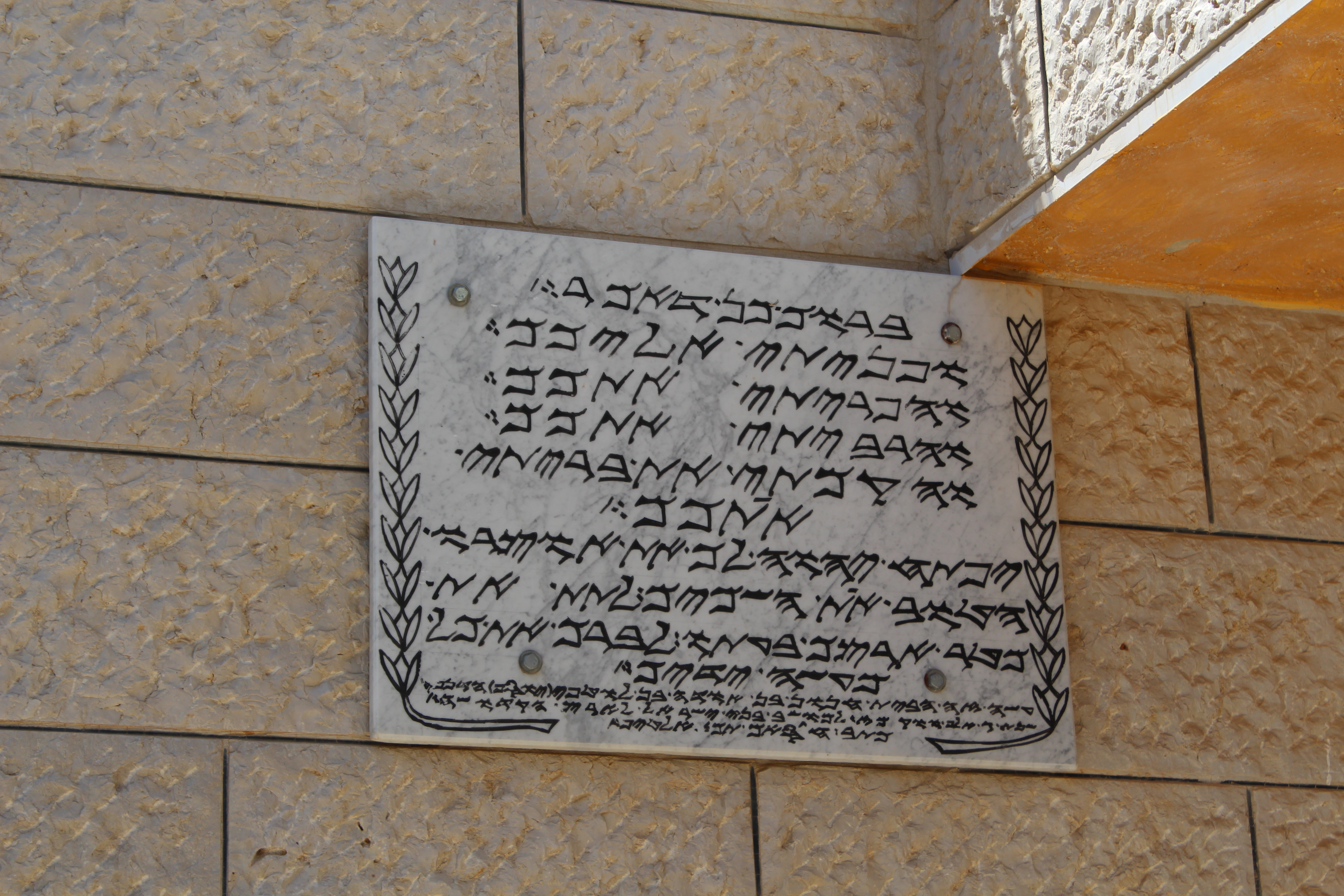
Samaritan Mezuzah on Mount Gerizim, written exposed, in Samaritan Hebrew. This one reads, "Blessed is the One who said: I will look with favor upon you, and make you fertile and multiply you; and I will maintain My covenant with you. (Leviticus 26:9) The LORD will open for you His bounteous store, the heavens, to provide rain for your land in season and to bless all your undertakings. (Deuteronomy 28:12)"

The Samaritans interpret the deuteronomic commandment to mean displaying any select text from the Samaritan version of the five Books of Moses. This can contain a blessing or a particularly holy or uplifting message. In the past they placed a stone plaque inscribed with the Ten Commandments above the house door, some examples dating back to the Byzantine (4th–7th century) and Early Muslim (7th–11th century) periods being now shown in the Israel Museum in Jerusalem.

Nowadays a Samaritan mezuzah is usually made of either marble, a wooden plate, or a sheet of parchment or high quality paper, on which they inscribe select verses from the Samaritan Torah. This they place either above the house door, or inside the house, in the entrance hall or at a prominent place on a large wall. These mezuzot are found in every Samaritan household as well as in the synagogue. Today some Samaritans would also use a Jewish-style mezuzah case and place inside it a small written Samaritan scroll, i.e. a text from the Samaritan Torah, written in the Samaritan alphabet. The more such mezuzot there are in the house, the better it is considered to be.

== Legal battles in the U.S. ==
The Jewish practice of affixing a mezuzah to the entranceway of a residential unit was rarely challenged in the United States or Canada. However, in Chicago in 2001, a condominium association at Shoreline Towers banned "mats, boots, shoes, carts or objects of any sort… outside unit entrance doors", which by board vote in 2004 was interpreted to be absolute. Shoreline Towers management removed the hallway mezuzot of condominium tenants. Complaints were subsequently filed with the Chicago Commission on Human Relations, Illinois Attorney General, and U.S. Department of Housing and Urban Development, alleging housing discrimination on the basis of religion. Shoreline Towers was not the sole condominium association in Chicago with such a restriction, although one of them agreed to modify its rule.

On reading a news report of the mezuzah dispute, Chicago alderman Burton Natarus drafted an amendment to the city's municipal code which made it illegal for a renter or owner of an apartment, house, or condo to be prohibited from "placing or affixing a religious sign, symbol or relic on the door, door post or entrance." Although there was opposition, it became law in Chicago that December. The first such legislation in North America, it included a maximum $500 fine for its violation.

Notwithstanding this legislation, in 2006, a federal court judge determined that the rule did not violate the Federal Fair Housing Act; the district court upheld the opinion on appeal in 2008; in 2009, the U.S. Court of Appeals for the 7th Circuit in Chicago reversed the 2008 decision, and the case proceeded. Meanwhile, records of the Chicago Jewish Star were unsuccessfully subpoenaed, and Illinois' anti-SLAPP legislation was applied. In 2011, a confidential settlement to the Shoreline Towers disputes was achieved.

In January 2006, a more narrowly focused amendment to the state's Condominium Property Act was initiated by Illinois Senator Ira Silverstein, the first such state law, which specifically prohibited Condominium Boards from creating "a rule or regulation that shall prohibit any reasonable accommodation for religious practices, including the attachment of religiously-mandated objects to the front door area of a condominium unit." That April, the bill was signed by Governor Rod Blagojevich, and went into effect January 1, 2007.

In 2006, a woman in a condo building in Fort Lauderdale, Florida, was instructed to remove the mezuzah from her hallway unit and threatened with a fine. After a lengthy legal battle, the condo association was found guilty of discrimination. In 2008, House Bill 995, an amendment to the Florida Condominium Act, modeled on the Illinois state legislation, became law.

In Texas in 2007, a couple living in Houston was instructed to "remove the item attached to your door frame" to avoid violating association rules. A legal battle ensued, during which a U.S. District Court judge ruled in 2008 on behalf of the condo association. Subsequently, the couple turned to Texas House of Representatives member Garnet F. Coleman. His bill to protect such religious displays, as introduced in 2009, was not adopted, but in June 2011 a slightly revised version (HB1278) was signed into law by Texas Governor Rick Perry.

A bill designed to prevent mezuzah bans nationwide was proposed in 2008 (H.R. 6932) by U.S. Congressman Jerrold Nadler. It never became law.

== See also ==
- Tzedakah box
