= Lengnau Mappot =

The Lengnau mappot; a collection of 218 Torah binders (also called wimpels), were discovered in the 1960s in the women's gallery of the synagogue in Lengnau (Aargau). In 1967, the wimpels were the subject of research by Florence Guggenheim-Grünberg, whose contribution was the first systematic description of this kind of collection. Today the Lengnau mappot belong to the Jewish Museum of Switzerland.

The Lengnau mappot span almost three centuries, from 1655 to 1906. The width of the fabric ribbons in the collection ranges from 10 cm to 24 cm. The length is typically between two and three and a half metres. The wimpels are embroidered or painted with decorated Hebrew letters in Ashkenazi square-script. The wimpels from before 1854 are embroidered, after that they are mostly painted.

As with all Ashkenazi Torah binders, the inscriptions on the Lengnau mappot follow the same pattern; first naming the son, then the father and then the child's date of birth according to the Jewish calendar. Some mappot additionally name Lengnau as the place of birth. A standardised saying follows; the boy should grow to the chuppa (marriage canopy) and good deeds under the guidance of the Torah. This wish, which originates from a blessing at circumcision, is illustrated by painted or embroidered pictures of Torah scrolls, chuppahs and other Jewish symbols.

There are very few collections of Torah binders that come from a well-known community. A few examples are the collections from Bechhofen and Gernsheim am Rhein, but neither is as comprehensive as the Lengnau mappot. The Lengnau mappot bear witness to an unbroken tradition of rural Judaism in Switzerland and are an interesting resource for research into family history. The following Jewish families in Switzerland are frequently mentioned in the Lengnau Torah binders:

Bloch

Braunschweig

Dreyfus

Guggenheim

Ris

Wyler

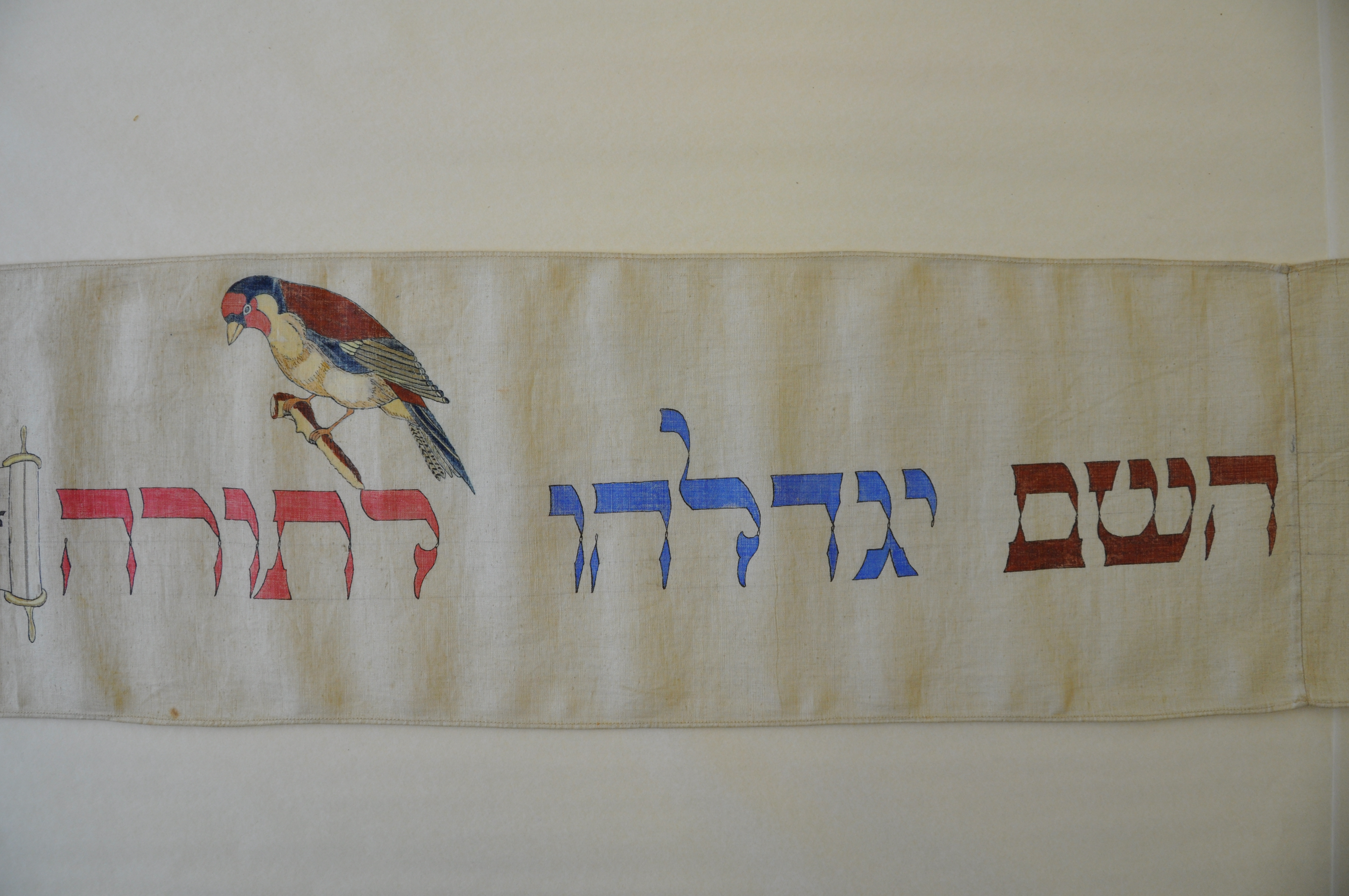
Painted wimpel from 1886 belonging to Markus Israel Guggenheim

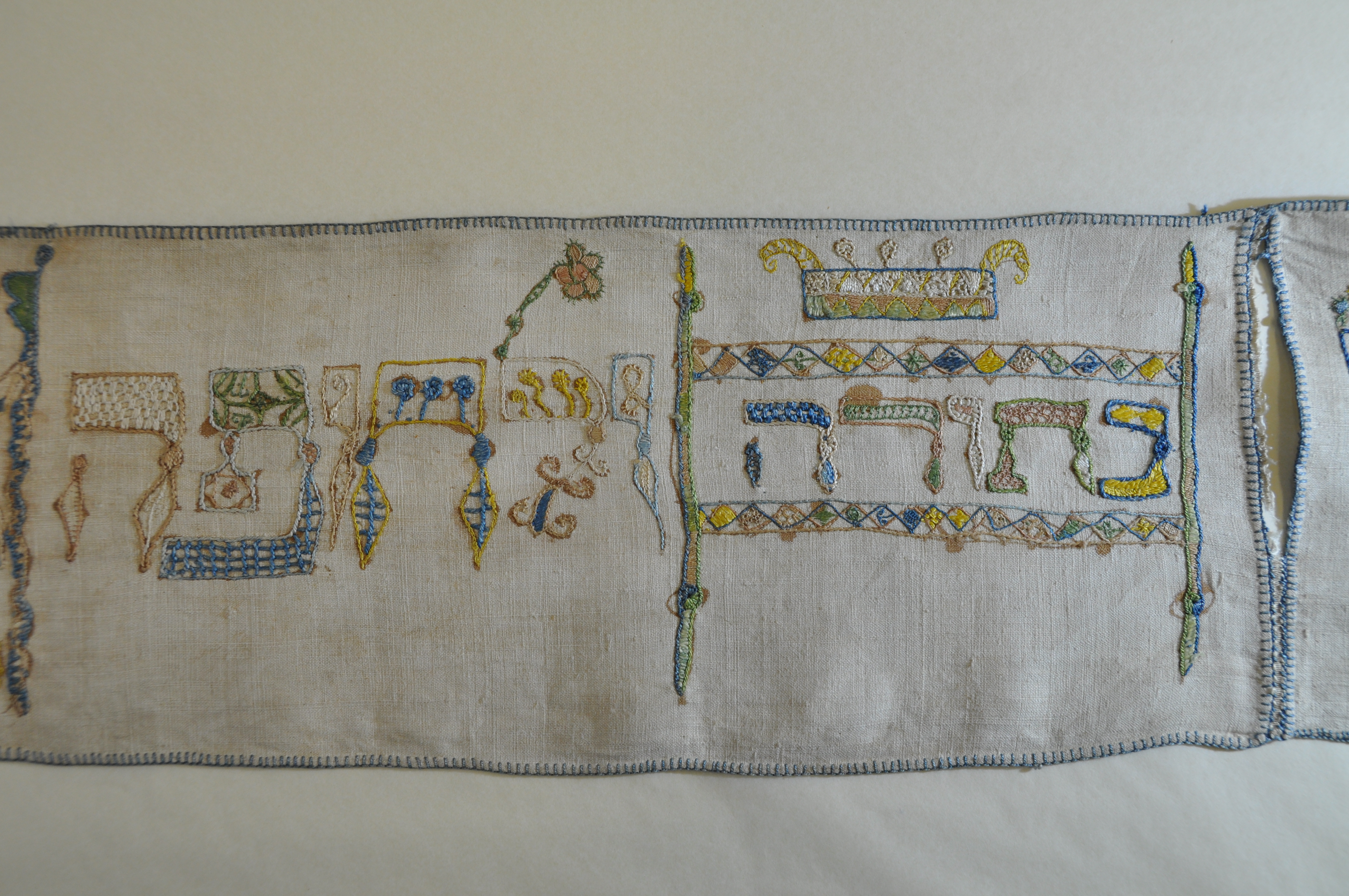
Embroidered wimpel from the Lengnau collection, Jewish Museum of Switzerland

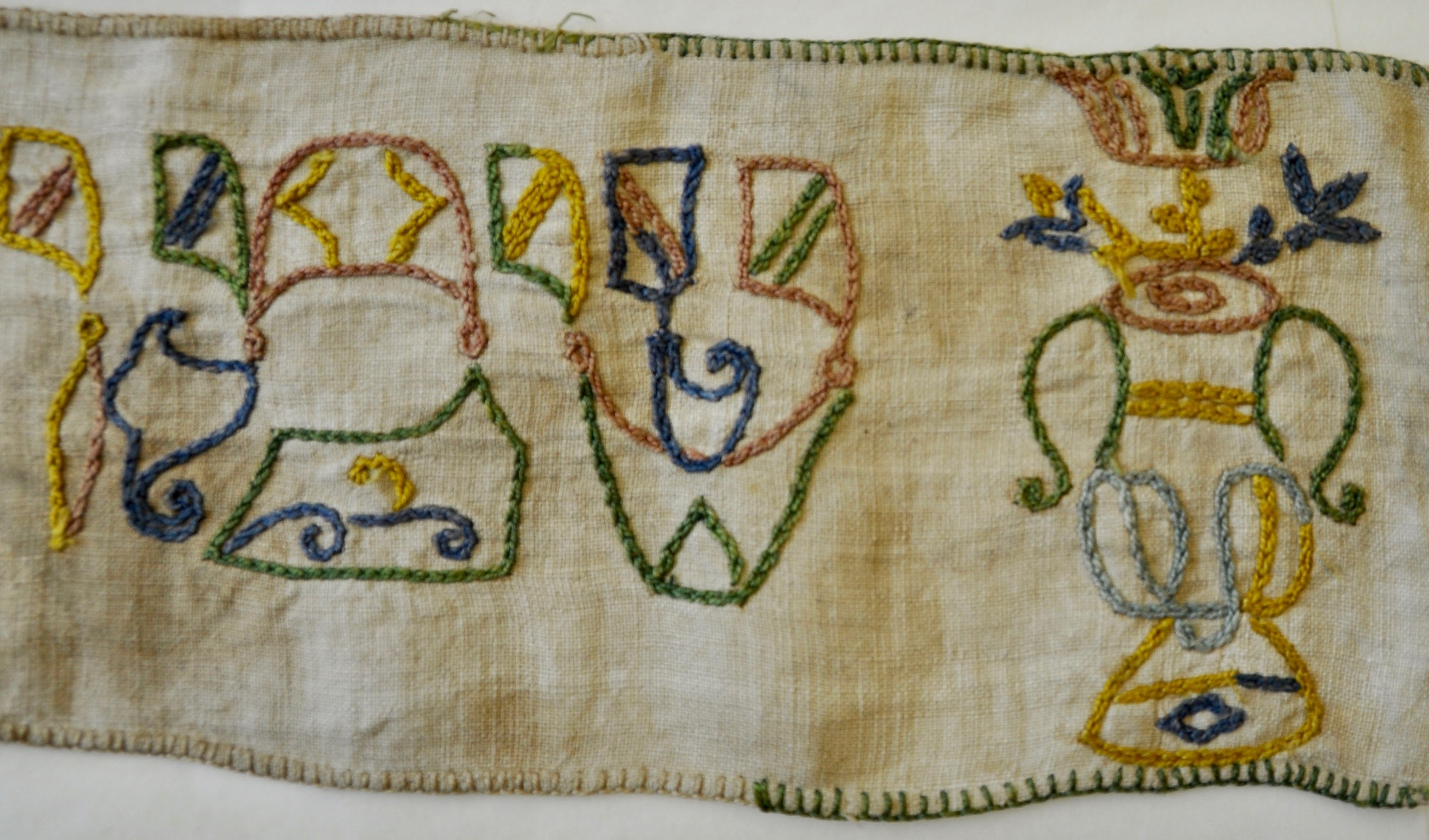
Embroidered wimpel belonging to Samuel, son of Meir, 1744

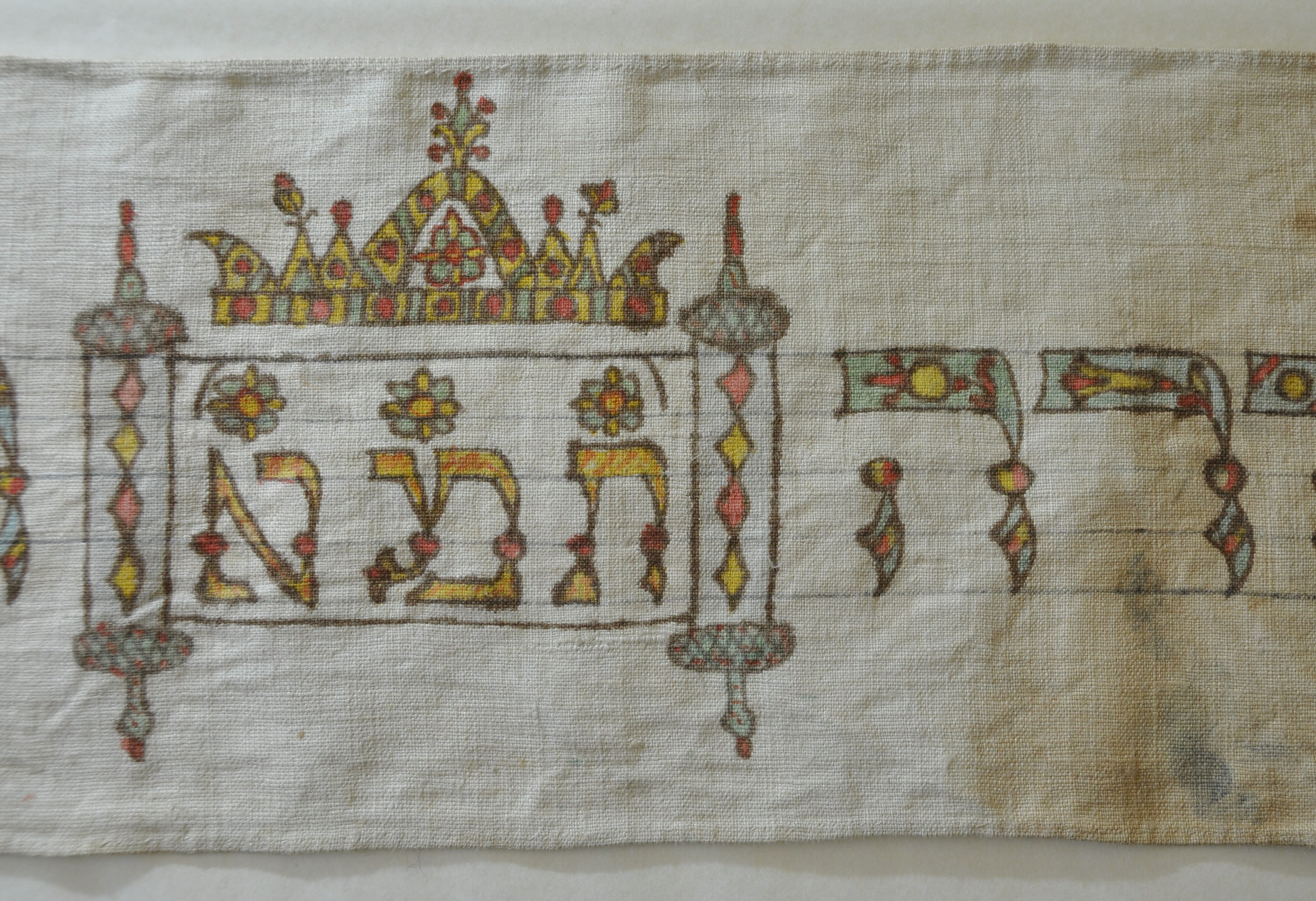
Torah scroll with crown, 1831

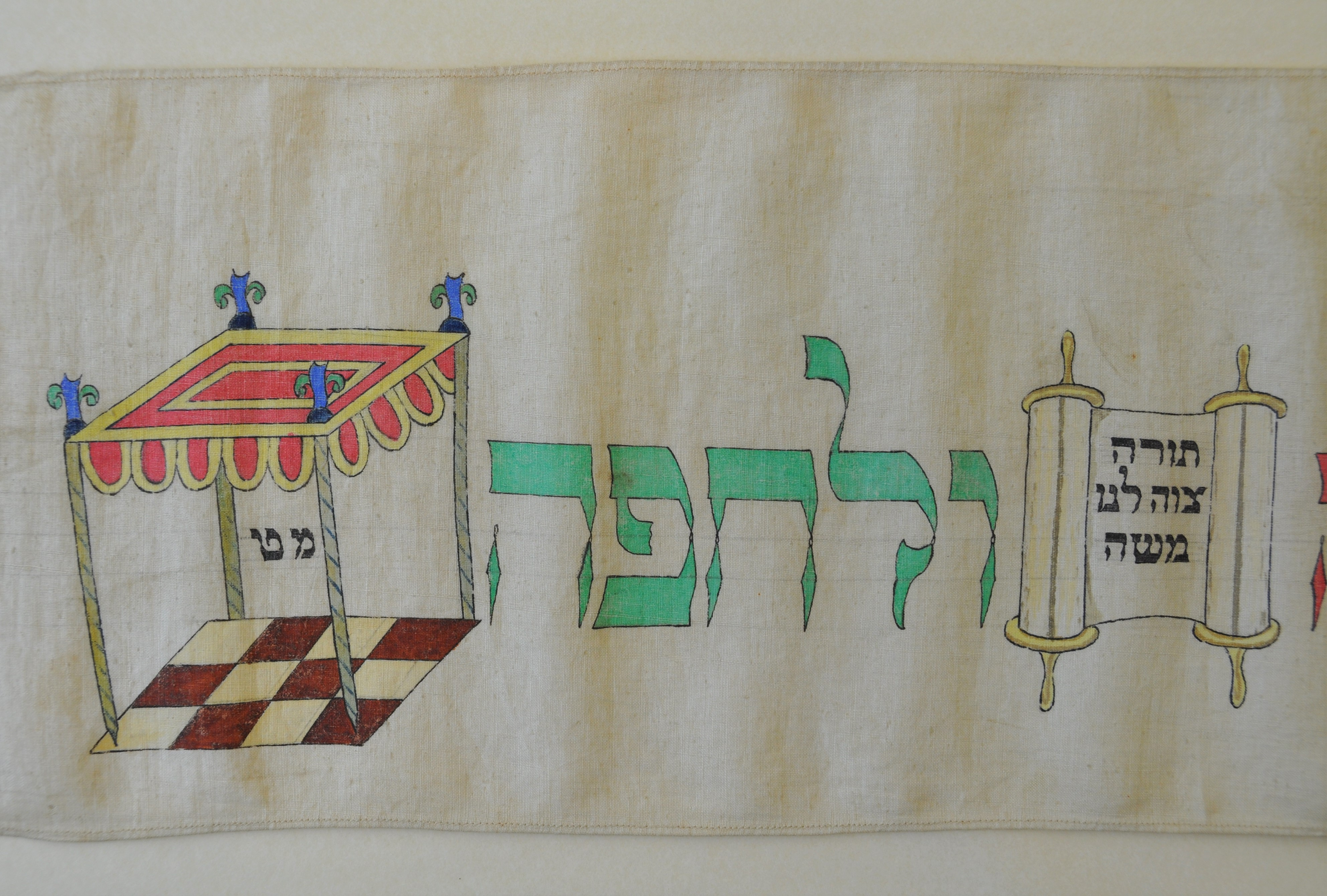
Chuppah and Torah scroll on a wimpel from 1886

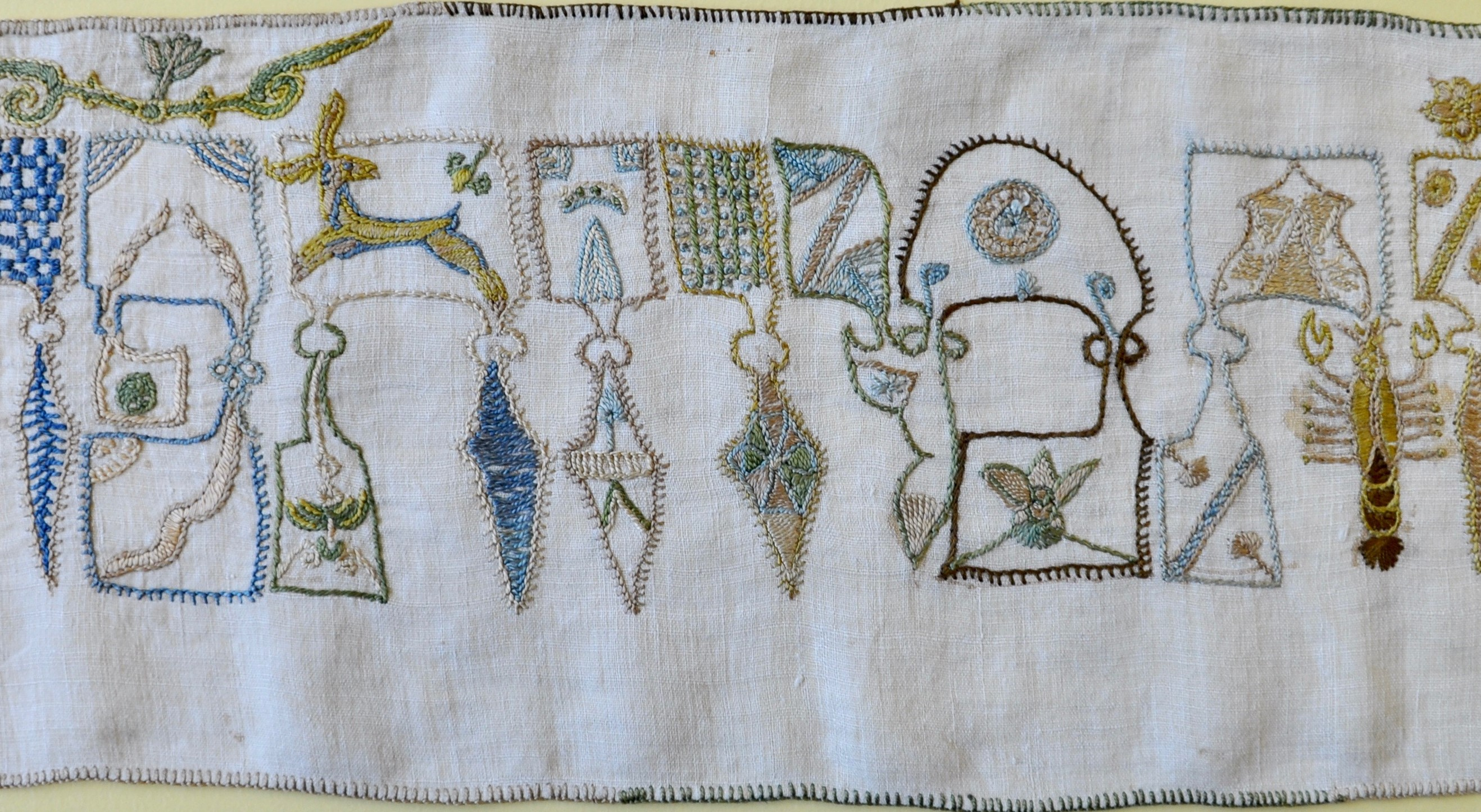
Intricately embroidered wimpel from 1726

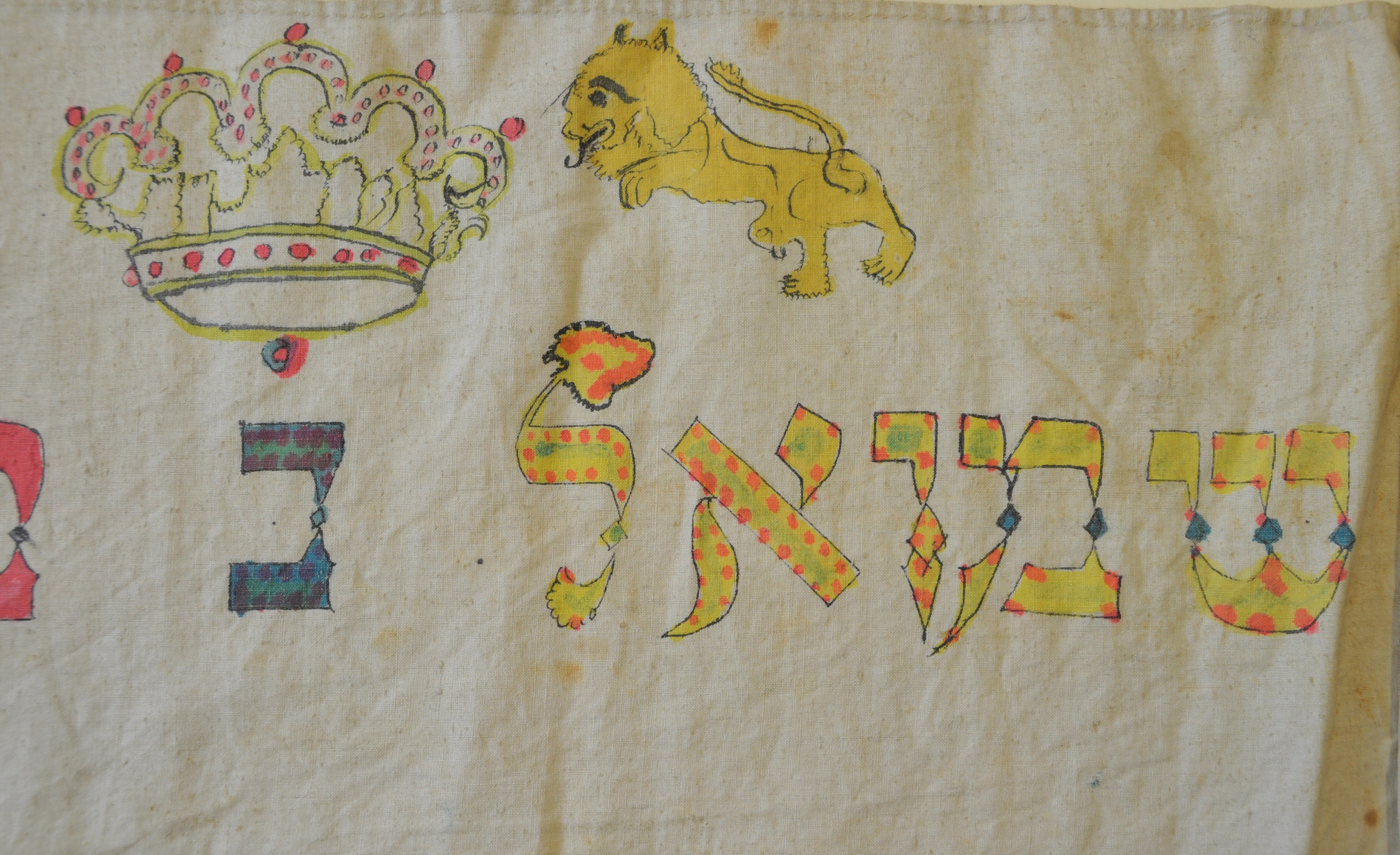
Detail of a lion and a crown on a wimpel from 1902
