= Universal Torah Registry =

Registry to prevent Torah scroll theft

The Universal Torah Registry was a project of the JCRC (Jewish Community Relations Council) of New York City, originally established in 1982, designed to protect and secure Torah scrolls of Jewish communities, from theft. As these scrolls may be valued at between $5,000 to $20,000, and could fetch similar amounts on the black market, synagogues have been a target of thieves.

The UTR currently has approximately 1000 subscribing synagogues nationwide. Some synagogues and Jewish communities are not aware of this program, and in some communities, religious leaders refuse to endorse the program.

The registry's operations were suspended in December, 2017. No new registrations are being accepted, but existing records will be maintained and provided to law enforcement in the event of a theft.
