= Raphael Ris =

Swiss rabbi ( 1728–1813)

Raphael Ris (also: Raphael Ries; 14 May 1728 in Niederhagenthal, Alsace; 25 May 1813 in Endingen AG) was a Swiss rabbi and kabbalist.

== Life ==
Raphael Ris, son of Abraham Ris, taught at Wolf Reichshofer's yeshiva in Buchsweiler from around 1768 after extensive Talmudic studies. Around 1784, he was the head of a small yeshiva in Niederhagenthal. In the summer of 1786, he moved from Alsace to Aargau. From then on, he lived in Endingen in the Surbtal valley and was rabbi for Lengnau AG and Endingen from 1788 until his death. His son Abraham Ris became his successor.

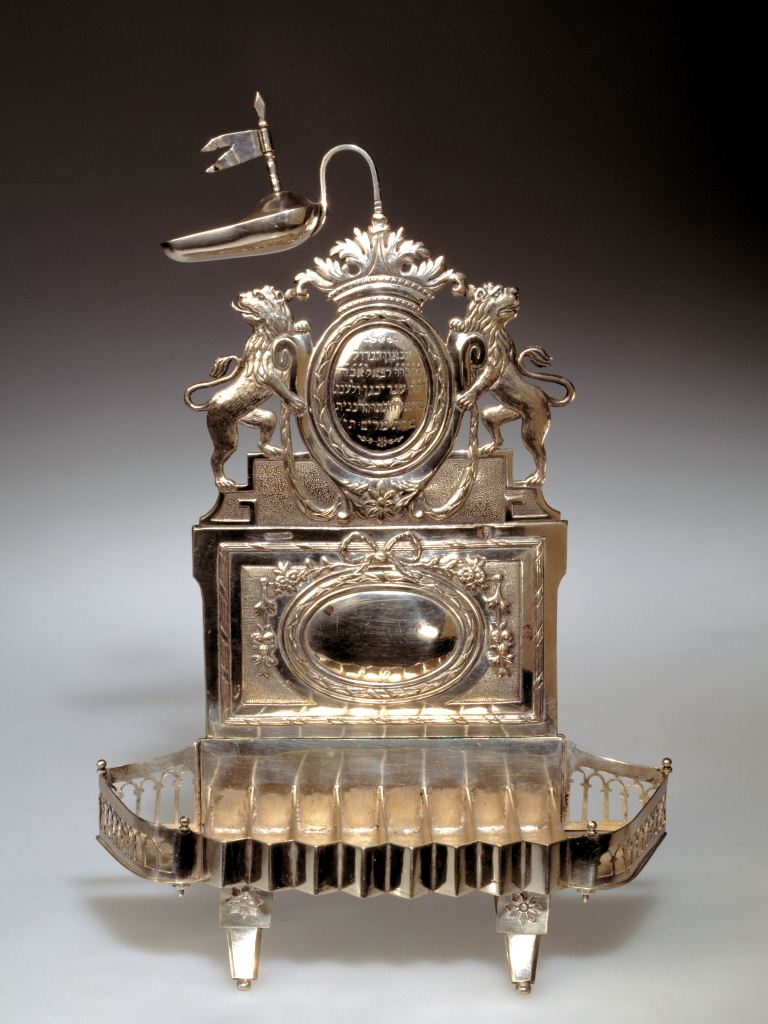
Hanukkah lamp belonging to Rabbi Raphael Ris, made in a silver workshop in Augsburg, 1804. In the collection of the Jewish Museum of Switzerland.

In 2000, the Jewish Museum of Switzerland dedicated a special exhibition to the Ris family: The Ris Rabbis. A family in the region.

Raphael Ris is buried in the Jewish cemetery in Endingen. There is a plaque in the entrance area to make it easier to find his grave, which is still visited today.
