= Monumenta Judaica =

1963/4 exhibition on Jewish religion and art

“Monumenta Judaica. 2000 Years of History and Culture of the Jews on the Rhine” (ger. Monumenta Judaica. 2000 Jahre Geschichte und Kultur der Juden am Rhein) was the first major exhibition on Jewish religion and art in the Rhineland area between Basel and Emmerich. The exhibition ran from 15 October 1963 to 15 March 1964 in the Kölnische Stadtmuseum (Cologne City Museum). With 2200 exhibits from 15 countries, the exhibition gave a comprehensive overview of the intellectual and communal life of the Jews on the Rhine between Basel and Emmerich over the course of 2000 years.

The exhibits came from public libraries and museums in Washington, the Vatican, Moscow, London, Vienna, Copenhagen, Budapest and Amsterdam, and from German institutions. The Jewish museums in New York and Cincinnati did not participate, nor did the Schocken Collection in Israel. Collections from private individuals were also featured in the exhibition, including the Judaica collection of Eduard Hoffmann-Krayer, the so-called ‘father of Swiss folklore’. Monumenta Judaica inspired the founding of the Jewish Museum of Switzerland in 1966.

== Background ==
A major reason for initiating the exhibition was the antisemitic graffiti on the Cologne synagogue in Roonstrasse in December 1959, which triggered a wave of antisemitic incidents in Germany. Seeing a need to educate people and provide information about Judaism, an initial suggestion was to bring the 1960/61 exhibition Synagoga. Kultgeräte und Kunstwerke von der Zeit der Patriarchen bis zur Gegenwart from Recklinghausen to Cologne. However, those responsible decided on a new special exhibition, which would be prepared over a two-year period under the direction of Dr. Konrad Schilling. Synagoga was the first comprehensive exhibition on Judaism in the post-war period, and mainly showed magnificent Jewish cult objects. In contrast, Monumenta Judaica was to be influenced by the regional historical exhibitions of the Weimar period, drawing in particular from the Jewish section of the millennium exhibition of the Rhineland in 1925.

== Publications ==
A catalogue, handbook and conclusion were published to accompany the exhibition, edited by Konrad Schilling, the director of the project. Of the 20 chapters in the handbook, most are devoted to a historical overview of the Jewish communities in the Rhineland, with some chapters dealing with specific topics, such as the Jewish religious year, Jewish welfare, the influence of the Hebrew Bible on Christian art, the Maccabees as Christian martyrs and the contribution of Jewish artists and writers to German cultural life. The catalogue follows the same scheme and the authors are the same in both volumes. Among the 15 contributors are Günther Ristow, Father Willehad Eckert, Fried Mühlberg, Eleonore Sterling, Peter Bloch, Wilhelm Treue, Ernst L. Ehrlich, E. G. Lowenthal, Hendrik G. van Dam, Ernst Roth, and E. Schereschewski, Rabbi of Cologne and Münster, who also served as an advisor.

== Funding ==
The exhibition was sponsored by the city of Cologne with financial support from the federal and state governments. Westdeutscher Rundfunk contributed greatly to its success through donations. Of the total costs, the city of Cologne contributed one third. Another third was raised through the sale of the handbook and catalogue and from admissions. Finally, the last third was the grants from the federal government, the state and the radio station.

== Main topics ==
The educational mission was particularly important to the organizers of the exhibition. The coexistence of the Jewish minority and the Christian majority, the shared influences of religions and cultures, and overcoming the ideological view of Judaism from the Nazi era were also central themes. The developmental guidelines of the exhibition can be described as modern and still relevant today:

- Presentation from the inner-Jewish point of view
- Diversity of environmental influences on the fate of the Jewish minority
- Avoidance of the impression that Jewish history is only the history of persecution
- Presentation of the lives of the “ordinary people”, not only life stories of well-known figures.

== Target group and visitor numbers ==
According to Konrad Schilling's report, 114,450 people visited the exhibition, including groups from religious institutions, education, the armed forces, and politics, such as the President of the Federal Republic of Germany Heinrich Lübke, Cardinal Frings, Moshe Sharett, Nahum Goldmann, Israel Goldstein, and Siegfried Moses.

One target group that the organizers and creators were particularly interested in reaching was young people. The visitor numbers proved the success of these efforts: Over 61 percent of the visitors, 70,232 people, were teenagers and young adults.

== Reception and legacy ==
The Cologne exhibition received numerous reviews in the national and international press. For example, the German daily Die Welt wrote on October 19, 1963:

„... Die Ausstellung will weder anklagen noch ‚wiedergutmachen‘; sie will ganz einfach die Wahrheit aufdecken und zu ihr hinführen, sie will durch Fakten, Dokumente und ‚Monumente‘ belehren und erziehen. Ihr Ziel ist Toleranz, nicht Mitleid und auch nicht Scham allein. Toleranz und Vorurteilslosigkeit als Vorbedingungen für echte Mitmenschlichkeit und gegenseitiges Verständnis.“

“... The exhibition does not want to accuse or ‘make amends’; it simply wants to uncover the truth and lead to it, it wants to instruct and educate through facts, documents and ‘monuments’. Its goal is tolerance, not pity and not just shame; tolerance and lack of prejudice as preconditions for genuine fellow humanity and mutual understanding.”

The New Yorker Staats-Zeitung wrote the following on the same day:

„Eine Form geistiger Wiedergutmachung, die sich in ihrer nachhaltigen Wirkung vielleicht noch segensreicher auf das deutsch-jüdische Verhältnis auswirken wird als manche materielle Entschädigung.“

“A form of spiritual reparation, whose lasting effect will perhaps have an even more beneficial effect on German-Jewish relations than many a material compensation.”

Despite expressing admiration for the exhibition as a whole, the weekend supplement of the Dutch newspaper Nieuwe Rotterdamse Courant criticised the positioning of the section on National Socialism as somewhat hidden, also claiming that the students guiding visitors through this section appeared a little uncomfortable.

One of the legacies of Monumenta Judaica was the creation of the Jewish Museum of Switzerland in 1966. Members of the Jewish association Espérance (a funeral society, or Chewra Kadischa) were inspired by their visit of the exhibition to found a Jewish museum in Switzerland. It was the first Jewish museum in the German-speaking world after World War II.

To mark the 60th anniversary of the exhibition, the Jewish Museum of Switzerland published an article on 16 October 2023.
