= Torah scroll =

Handwritten copy of the Torah

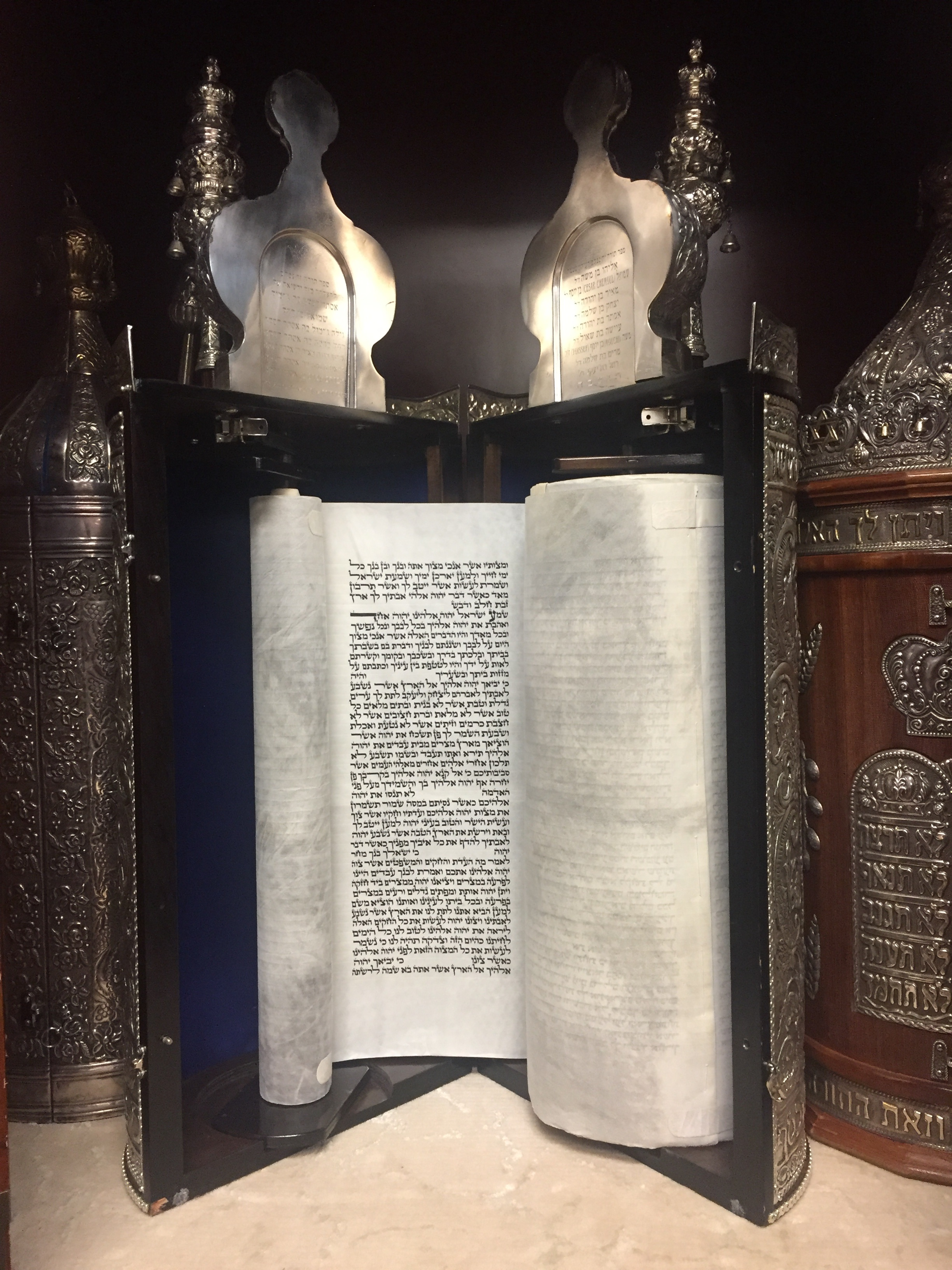
A Sephardic Torah scroll rolled to the first paragraph of the Shema

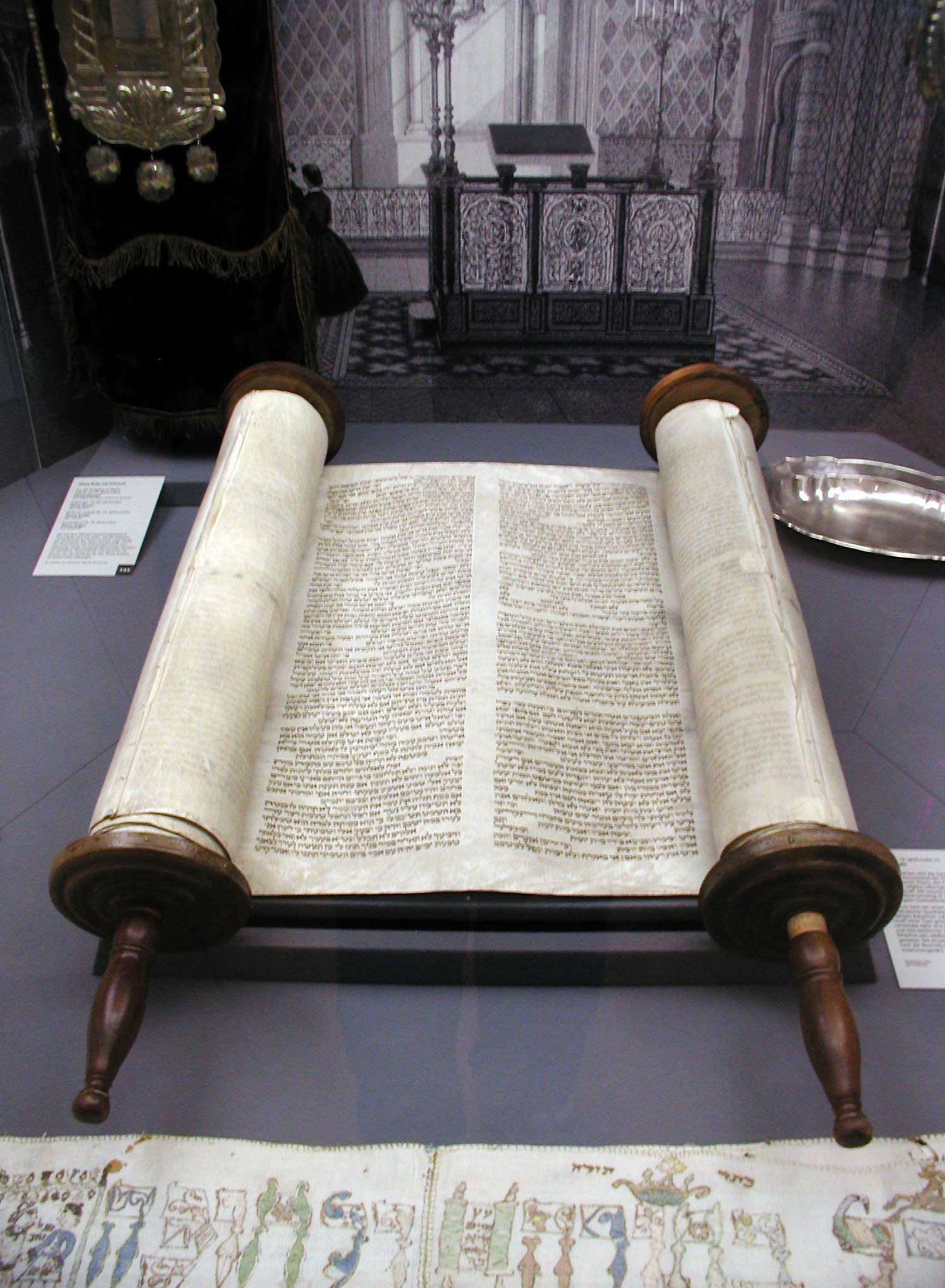
An Ashkenazi Torah scroll rolled to the Decalogue

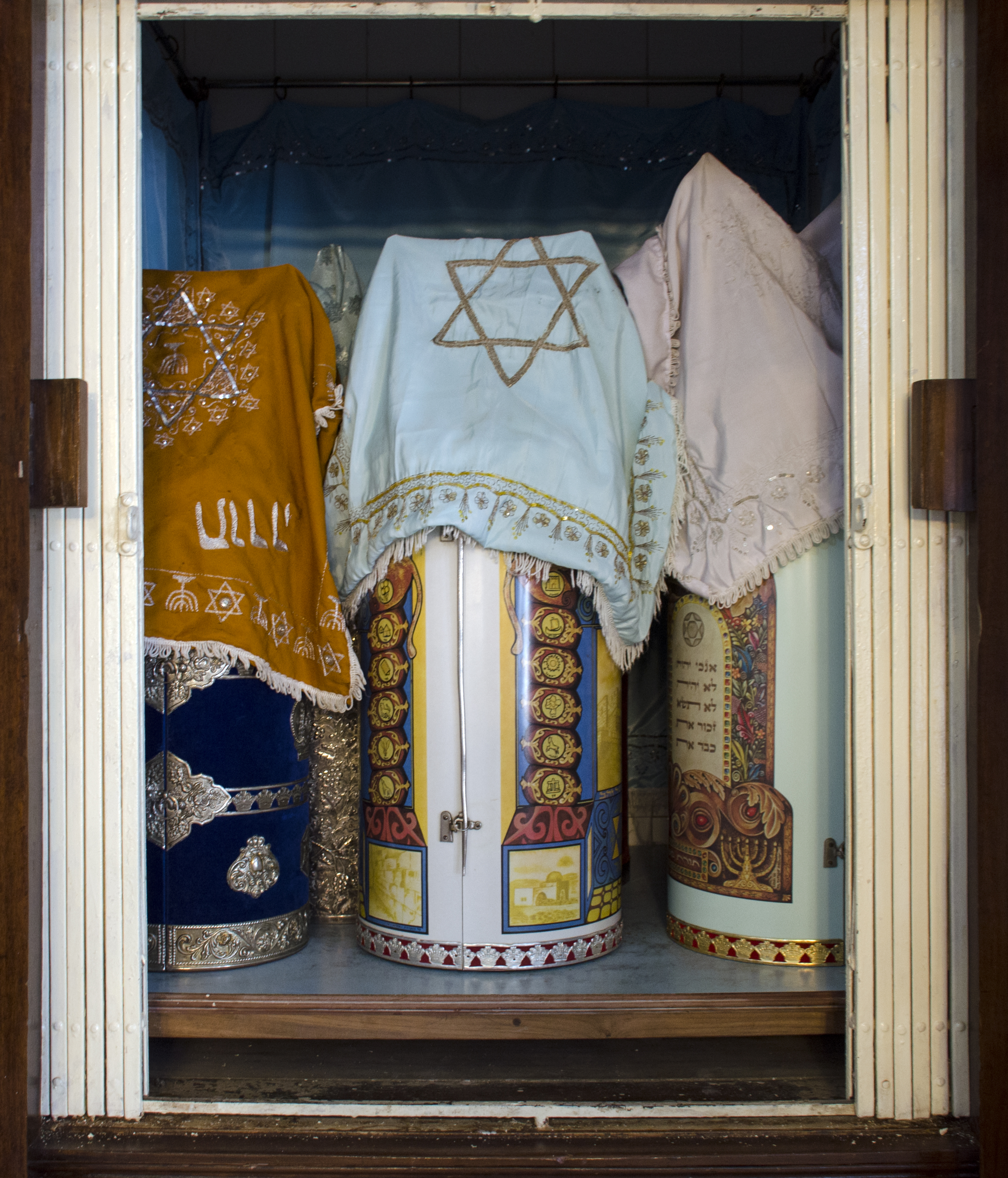
Torah cases at Knesset Eliyahoo Synagogue, Mumbai, India

A Torah scroll (Hebrew: סֵפֶר תּוֹרָה, romanized: Sefer Torah, lit. 'Book of Torah'; pl. סִפְרֵי תוֹרָה, Sifrei Torah) is a handwritten copy of the Torah, meaning the five books of Moses (the first books of the Hebrew Bible). The Torah scroll is mainly used in the ritual of Torah reading during Jewish prayers. At other times, it is stored in the holiest spot within a synagogue, the Torah ark, which is usually an ornate curtained-off cabinet or section of the synagogue built along the wall that most closely faces Jerusalem, the direction Jews face when praying.

The text of the Torah is also commonly printed and bound in book form for non-ritual functions, called a Chumash (plural Chumashim; "five-part", for the five books of Moses), and is often accompanied by commentaries or translations.

== History ==
Findings from Qumran, Masada, and the Bar Kokhba refuge caves indicate that biblical scrolls were abundant and widely circulated in late Second Temple Judaea.

=== Single-scroll Pentateuch ===
The researchers working on the En-Gedi Scroll have concluded that by the fourth century CE, there was no halakhic rule yet prescribing that scrolls used for liturgical purposes must contain the entire Pentateuch. As of 2018, no other statements regarding when this rule came into being could be made with any degree of certainty. While the physically determined date for the scroll points to the 3rd or 4th centuries, its text has been palaeographically dated by Ada Yardeni to the first century CE or the early second at the latest, a discrepancy not uncommon in this field, which could push back in time the entire discussion.

=== En-Gedi Scroll ===
The En-Gedi Scroll is a Hebrew parchment radiocarbon-dated to the 3rd or 4th century CE (88.9% certainty for 210–390 CE), although paleographical considerations suggest that it may date back to the 1st or early 2nd century CE. The charred scroll, found in situ in the Torah niche of the ruined synagogue of the Jewish town of Ein Gedi (the town having been abandoned in the 7th century CE after a fire), was discovered to contain a portion of Leviticus, making it the earliest copy of a Pentateuchal book ever found in a Holy Ark. The deciphered text fragment is identical to what was to become during the Middle Ages the standard text of the Hebrew Bible, the Masoretic Text, which it precedes by several centuries; it thus constitutes the earliest evidence of this authoritative text version. The scroll is badly charred and fragmented and required noninvasive scientific techniques to virtually unwrap and read.

== Usage ==
Torah reading from a Torah scroll or Sefer Torah is traditionally reserved for Monday and Thursday mornings, as well as for Shabbat, fast days, and Jewish holidays. The presence of a quorum of ten Jewish adults (minyan) is required for the reading of the Torah to be held in public during the course of the worship services. As the Torah is sung, following the often dense text is aided by a yad ("hand"), a metal or wooden hand-shaped pointer that protects the scrolls by avoiding unnecessary contact of the skin with the parchment.

All Jewish prayers start with a blessing (berakhah), thanking God for revealing the Law to the Jews (Matan Torah), before Torah reading and all days during the first blessings of the morning prayer (Shacharit).

== Production ==
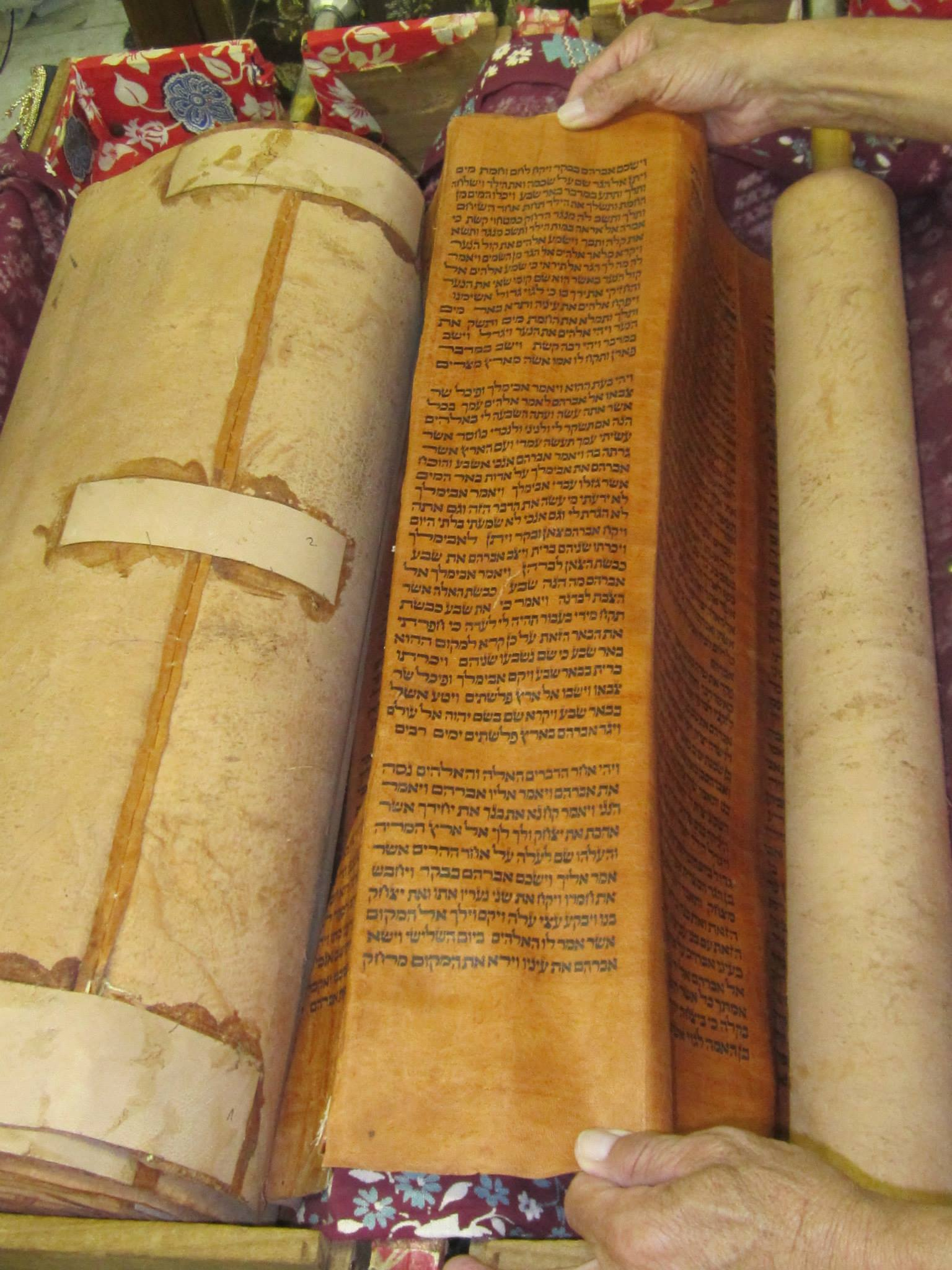
A 200-year-old Yemenite Torah scroll, on gevil, from the Rambam Synagogue in Nahalat Ahim, Jerusalem. The sofer (scribe) was from the Sharabi family.

According to halakha (Jewish law), a Torah scroll is a copy of the Hebrew text of the Torah handwritten on special types of parchment by using a quill or another permitted writing utensil, dipped in ink. Producing a Torah scroll fulfills one of the 613 commandments.

Written entirely in Biblical Hebrew, a Torah scroll contains 304,805 letters, all of which must be duplicated precisely by a trained scribe, or sofer, an effort which may take as long as approximately one and a half years. An error during transcription may render the Torah scroll pasul ("invalid").

=== Parchment and ink ===
According to the Talmud, all scrolls must be written on gevil parchment that is treated with salt, flour and m'afatsim (a residue of wasp enzyme and tree bark) in order to be valid. Scrolls not processed in this way are considered invalid.

There are only two types of kosher parchment allowed for a Torah scroll: gevil and klaf.

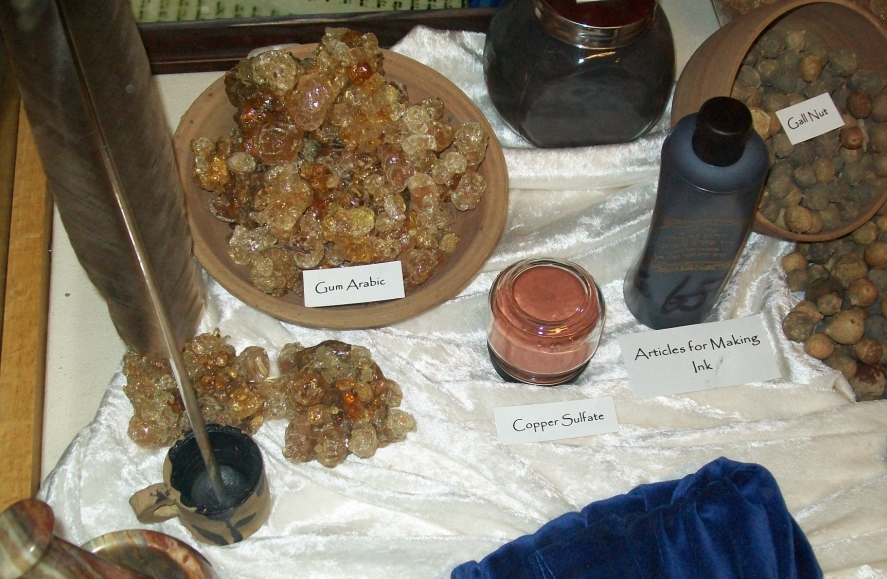
Ingredients used in making ink for Hebrew scrolls today.

The ink used is subject to specific rules. The ink needs to adhere to a surface that flexes and bends as the scroll is rolled and unrolled, so special inks were developed. Even so, ink slowly flakes off with time and use; if ink from too many letters wears away, a Torah scroll is rendered pasul ("invalid") and can no longer be used.

=== Scribal work ===
After the preparation of the parchment sheet, the scribe must mark out the parchment using the sargel ("ruler") ensuring the guidelines are straight. Only the top guide is done and the letters suspended from it. Most modern Torah scrolls are written with forty-two lines of text per column (Yemenite Jews use fifty-one). Very strict rules about the position and appearance of the Hebrew alphabet are observed. Any of several Hebrew scripts may be used, most of which are fairly ornate and exacting. The fidelity of the Hebrew text of the Tanakh, and the Torah in particular, is considered paramount, down to the last letter: translations or transcriptions are frowned upon for formal service use, and transcribing is done with painstaking care.

Some errors are inevitable in the course of production. If the error involves a word other than the names of God the mistaken letter may be obliterated from the scroll by scraping the letter off the scroll with a sharp object. If the name of God is written in error, the entire page must be cut from the scroll and a new page added, and the page written anew from the beginning. The new page is sewn into the scroll to maintain continuity of the document. The old page is treated with appropriate respect, and is either buried or placed in a genizah rather than being otherwise destroyed or discarded.

The completion of the Torah scroll is a cause for celebration in the community, and guests of the individual who commissioned the Torah are invited to a celebration wherein each of the guests is given the opportunity to write one of the final letters. It is thought to be a great honor to be chosen for this.

== Commandment to write a scroll ==
It is a religious duty or mitzvah for every Jewish male to either write or have written for him a Torah scroll. Of the 613 commandments, one – the 82nd as enumerated by Rashi, and the final as it occurs in the text the Book of Deuteronomy (Deuteronomy 31:19) – is that every Jewish male should write a Torah scroll in his lifetime. This is law number 613 of 613 in the list of Laws of the Torah as recorded by Rabbi Joseph Telushkin in his book "Biblical Literacy", 1st edition, New York: Morrow 1997, p. 592: "The commandment that each Jew should write a Torah scroll during his lifetime."

It is considered a tremendous merit to write (or commission the writing of) a Torah scroll, and a significant honour to have a Torah scroll written in one's honour or memory.

== Professional scribes (soferim) ==
In modern times, it is usual for some scholars to become soferim and to be paid to complete a Torah scroll under contract on behalf of a community or by individuals to mark a special occasion or commemoration. Because of the work involved, these can cost tens of thousands of US dollars to produce to ritually proper standards.

== Printed Torah (Chumash) ==
A printed version of the Torah is known colloquially as a Chumash (plural Chumashim). Although strictly speaking it is known as Chamishah Chumshei Torah (Five "Fifths" of Torah). They are treated as respected texts, but not anywhere near the level of sacredness accorded a Torah scroll, which is often a major possession of a Jewish community. A chumash contains the Torah and other writings, usually organised for liturgical use, and sometimes accompanied by some of the main classic commentaries.

== Torah ark ==
While not in use, a Torah scroll (Sefer Torah) is housed in the Torah ark (Aron Kodesh or Hekhal), which in its turn is usually veiled by an embroidered parochet (curtain), as it should be according to Exodus 26:31–34.

== Torah decorations ==
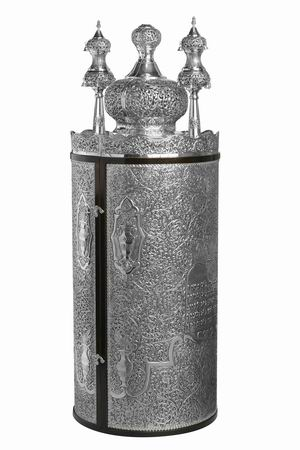
A sterling silver Torah case. In some traditions the Torah is housed in an ornamental wooden case.

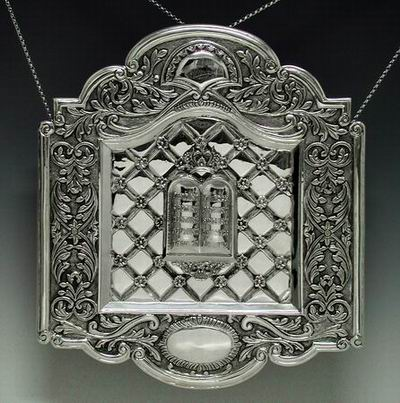
A Sterling Silver Torah Breast Plate - or Hoshen - often decorate Torah Scrolls.

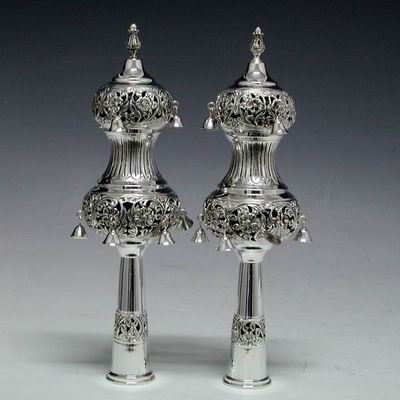
A set of sterling silver finials (rimmonim, from the Hebrew for "Pomegranate") are used to decorate the top ends of the rollers.

The gold and silver ornaments belonging to the scroll are collectively known as kele kodesh (sacred vessels). The scroll itself will often be girded with a strip of silk (see wimpel) and "robed" with a piece of protective fine fabric, called the "Mantle of the Law". It is decorated with an ornamental priestly breastplate, scroll-handles (‘etz ḥayyim), and the principal ornament—the "Crown of the Law", which is made to fit over the upper ends of the rollers when the scroll is closed. Some scrolls have two crowns, one for each upper end. The metalwork is often made of beaten silver, sometimes gilded. The scroll-handles, breastplate and crown often have little bells attached to them.

The housing has two rollers, each of which has two handles used for scrolling the text, four handles in all. Between the handles and the rollers are round plates or disks which are carved with images of holy places, engraved with dedications to the donor's parents or other loved ones, and decorated with gold or silver.

=== Mizrachi and Romaniote traditions ===
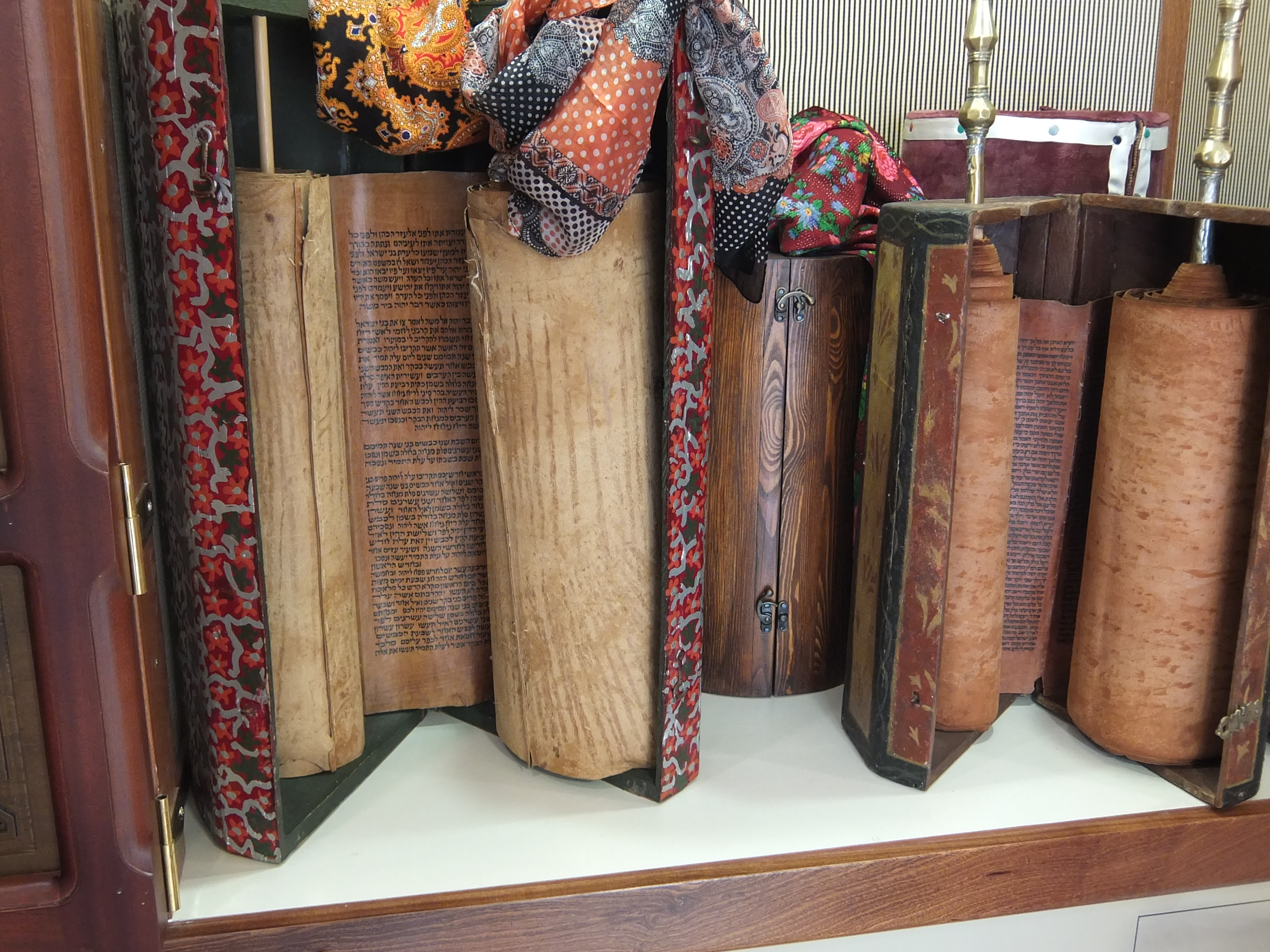
Traditional Oriental Torah cases

In the Mizrachi and Romaniote traditions, the Torah scroll is generally not robed in a mantle, but rather housed in an ornamental wooden case which protects the scroll, called a "tik", plural tikim. Some Sephardic communities — those communities associated with the Spanish diaspora, such as Moroccan Jews, the Spanish and Portuguese Jews (with the exception of the Hamburg tradition), and the Judaeo-Spanish communities of the Ottoman Empire — also use tikim, though this is not always the case.

== Inauguration ==
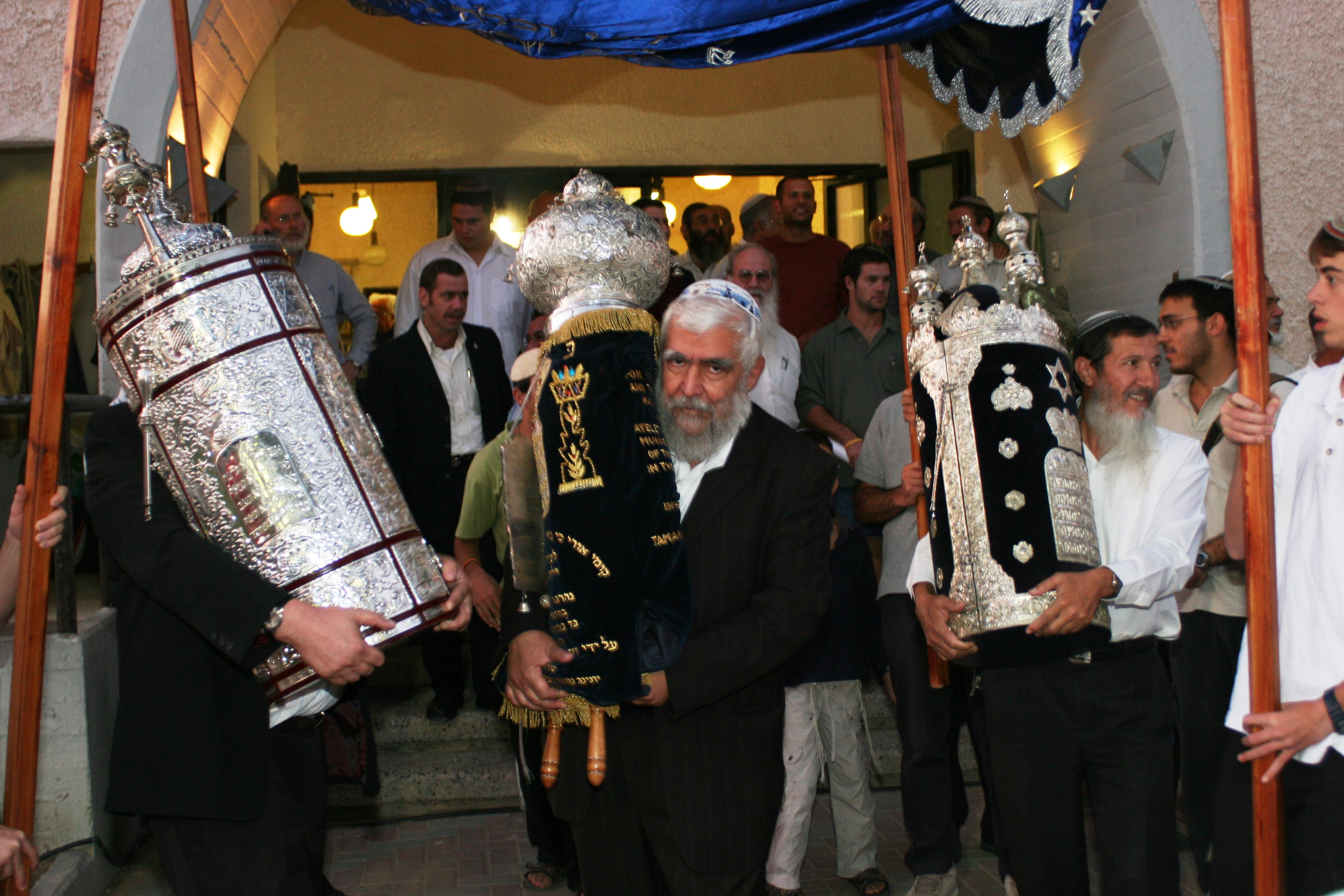
Torah scrolls are escorted into a new synagogue in Kfar Maimon, Israel, 2006

The installation of a new Torah scroll into a synagogue, or into the sanctuary or study hall (beth midrash) of a religious school (yeshiva), rabbinical college, university campus, nursing home, military base, or other institution, is done in a ceremony known as hachnosas sefer Torah, or "ushering in a Torah scroll"; this is accompanied by celebratory dancing, singing, and a festive meal.

=== Biblical roots ===
This practice has its source in the escorting of the Ark of the Covenant to Jerusalem, led by King David. As described in the Books of Samuel, this event was marked by dancing and the playing of musical instruments (2 Samuel 6:14–15). Both the priests or kohanim and David himself "danced before the Ark" or "danced before the Lord".

== Handling the scroll ==
Special prayers are recited when the Torah scroll is removed from the ark and the text is chanted, rather than spoken, in a special melodic manner (see Cantillation and Nigun). Whenever the scroll is opened to be read it is laid on a piece of cloth called the mappah. When the Torah scroll is carried through the synagogue, the members of the congregation may touch the edge of their prayer shawl (tallit) to the Torah scroll and then kiss the shawl as a sign of respect. As it is important to guard the sanctity of a Torah, dropping it, or allowing it to fall, is regarded as a desecration.

== See also ==
- Five Megillot (the "Five Scrolls"), parts of the Hebrew Bible traditionally grouped together
- Hakhel, biblical commandment to assemble for a Torah reading
- Ktav Ashuri, the Aramaic alphabet adopted by Judaism for writing the Hebrew language
- List of Hebrew Bible manuscripts - list of ancient scrolls and codices
- Tikkun (book), used to prepare for the reading of Torah scroll in synagogue
- Torah scroll (Yemenite), the specific Yemenite (as opposed to Ashkenazi or Sephardic) tradition of writing the Torah scroll
- Universal Torah Registry, an initiative to prevent Torah scroll theft
