= Wimpel =

Cloth used in Judaism during circumcision

A wimpel (Yiddish: ווימפל, from German, "cloth," derived from Old German, bewimfen, meaning "to cover up" or "conceal") is a long, linen sash used as a binding for the Sefer Torah by Jews of Germanic origin. It is made from the cloth used to swaddle a baby boy at his bris milah, uniting the communal world of the synagogue with the individual's own life cycle.

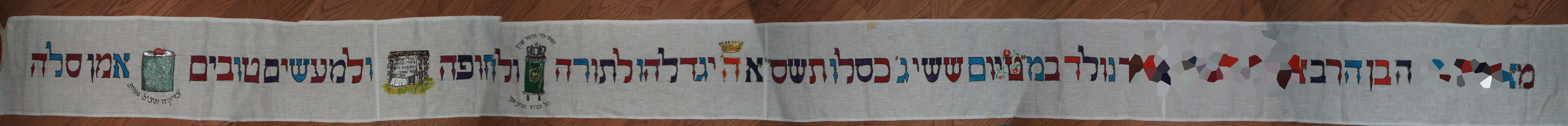
A modern Wimpel with the name obscured

The wimpel is an offshoot of a common Jewish practice. In the times of the Tannaim, all Torah scrolls were wrapped only with a cloth, known in Hebrew as a “mappah,” or in German, a “wimpel.” As with other holy Judaic objects, donating a mappah was considered to be a great mitzvah and honor, and very often a groom would donate one on the eve of his wedding. Most of these were made from old clothing. While some Rabbis approved of this practice, others did not because they felt that it was not proper respect for the Torah. Unlike these controversial “second-hand” mappot, the cloth used at a baby's circumcision was undoubtedly holy, and it gradually became the custom to donate these as mappot.

There are many variations as to what takes place at the actual wimpel ceremony. One common approach is to bring it to synagogue when the boy turns three and is toilet-trained. He and his father get the aliyah of gelilah, and together they wrap the wimpel around the Torah. (Variations include the child's age, the type of aliyah, and the extent of the child's participation in the actual ceremony.) Afterwards, the family invites the community to join them for a kiddush, a small celebratory party.

This custom is still observed today by most members of the German community. It is an extremely joyous occasion, and its main purpose is to instill a love and enthusiasm for shul and Judaism within the child.

== Origins ==
Some attribute the origins of the custom to a story recorded about a time when the Maharil was the sandek for a circumcision. The circumciser, known as the "mohel", performed the circumcision, and then realized that he had forgotten to bring a bandage. The Maharil understood that this was a life-threatening situation, and he instructed the mohel to use a mappah from one of the synagogue's Torah scrolls as a bandage. Then the Maharil instructed the child's parents to wash it once they were done with it and return it to the synagogue with a minor contribution to reimburse the synagogue for their use of the mappah. However, there are reasons to believe that the practice of using the cloth from the circumcision predates the Maharil, and the story is only of interest to illustrate that the cloth, even after being sanctified with the holiness of the Sefer Torah, may be used for the wrapping of the baby at the circumcision. See Rabbi Rabbi Binyamin Shlomo Hamburger's Shoroshei Minhag Ashkenaz for more details about this discussion.

On display in the Jewish Museum in Worms, Germany: Wimpels which were damaged during Kristallnacht

This incident highlighted the connection between the Torah and circumcision, as both relate to covenants that the Jewish people have with God (the covenants of Torah and circumcision). The custom gradually developed into the one that is practiced today by German Jews: At a baby's circumcision, the mohel places a long swatch of white cloth – the wimpel – under the pillow. Afterwards, the wimpel is beautifully decorated – it can be either painted or embroidered – with the child's name, date of birth, and the Hebrew phrase which states “Just like he entered the [covenant of] circumcision, so too he should [the covenant of] Torah, marriage, and good deeds.” Some mothers do the artwork themselves; others retain the services of “wimpel professionals,” e.g., men or women who do this as a side job or hobby.

Another explanation comes from an 80-year-old lady who remembers a ceremony from her synagogue in Germany, where the young child was brought to the synagogue once he was free of diapers, and the women would throw the wimpel on the Torah, while the men carried the Torah below the Court of Women (Ezrat Nashim).

The wimpel was then dedicated to the synagogue, symbolizing the fact the child is now pure, and can take part in the service.

== Creating the wimpel ==
The wimpel is created shortly after the brit milah using the swaddling cloth that was used at that ceremony. The cloth is cleaned, cut into strips and sewn into a sash measuring six or seven inches wide and ten or twelve feet long. The child's Hebrew name and date of birth are painted or embroidered onto the cloth, usually by the mother or grandmother, along with the traditional blessing:

- ה' יגדלהו לתורה ולחופה ולמעשים טובים אמן
- "...may God raise him up to [a life of] Torah, a successful marriage, and good deeds, Amen."

== Symbols and motifs ==
=== Chuppah and Torah Scroll ===
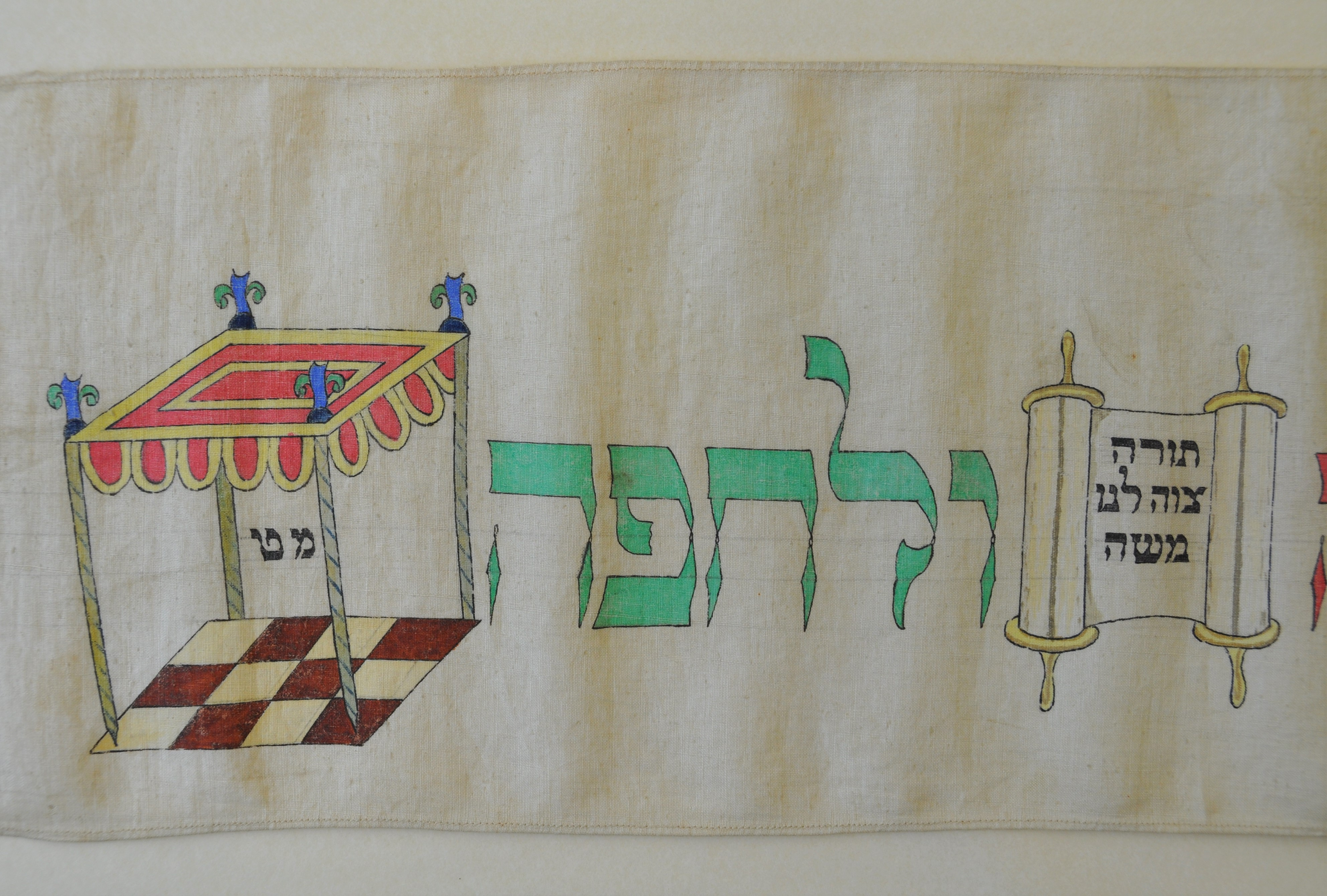
Detail of Chuppah and Torah on an 1886 wimpel

Images relating to the traditional blessing are frequently found on wimpels. The idea of founding a Jewish family as a married couple and passing on religious traditions is an idealised wish for the future of the young boy, usually represented by images of chuppahs and Torah scrolls painted or embroidered onto the wimpel.

=== Crown ===
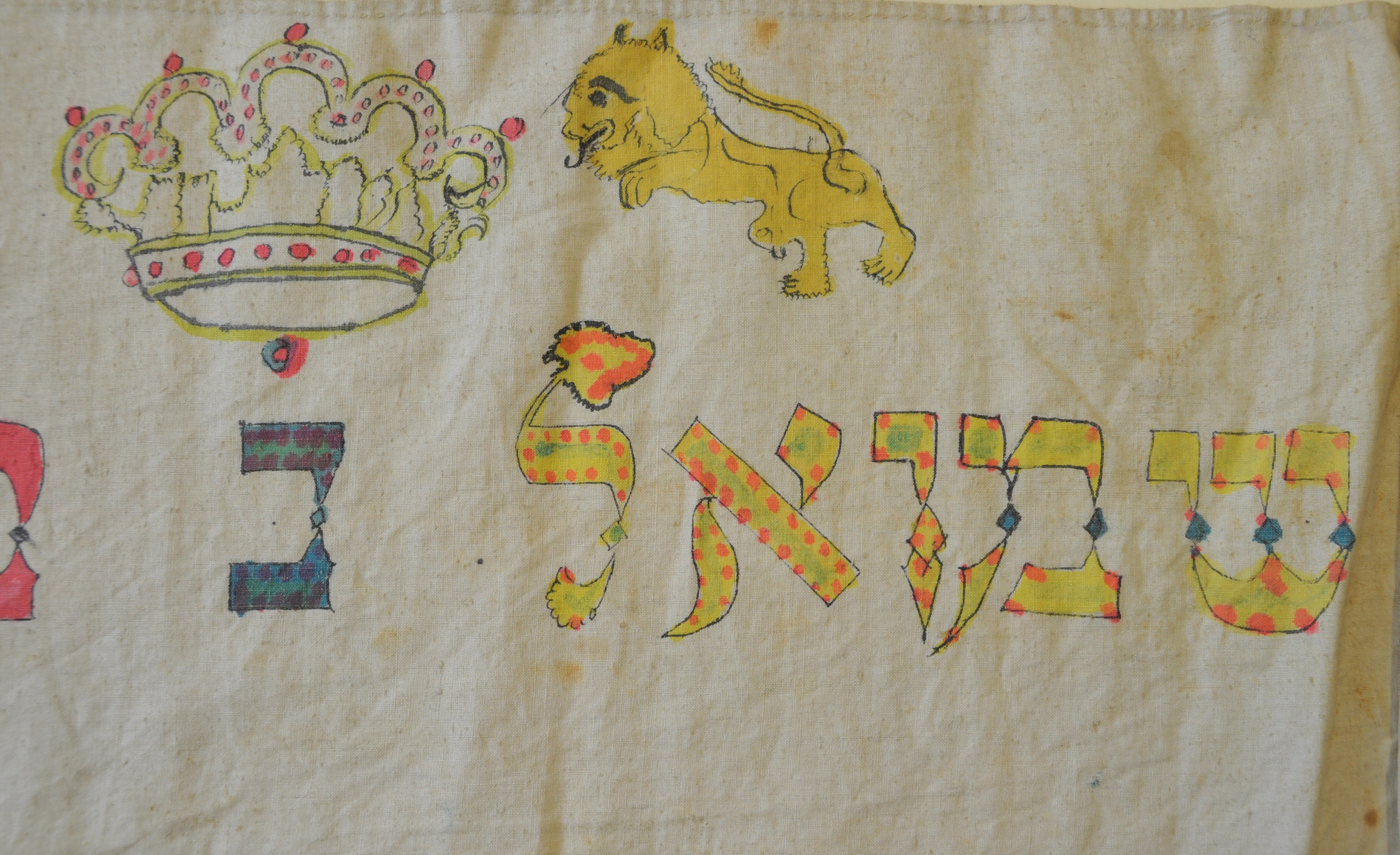
Crown and lion on a 1902 wimpel

The crown represents the "Crown of the Torah".“ It is set on a multitude of ritual objects and emphasizes the Torah’s claim to authority. On wimpels it is often depicted directly above the Torah scroll. The crown may differ according to the time, place and relevant monarchic system.

=== Lions ===
The appearance of lions on wimpels is probably linked to a popular saying in the Mishnah, Pirkei Avot, V:20: "Be bold as a leopard, light as an eagle, fleeting as a deer and mighty as a lion to do the will of your Father in Heaven." A lion may also symbolize the name of the owner of the wimpel: Löw/Ariel. From an early date, Lions were associated with the Tribes of Israel, Judah and Dan.

=== Deer and scorpions (animals and astrological signs) ===
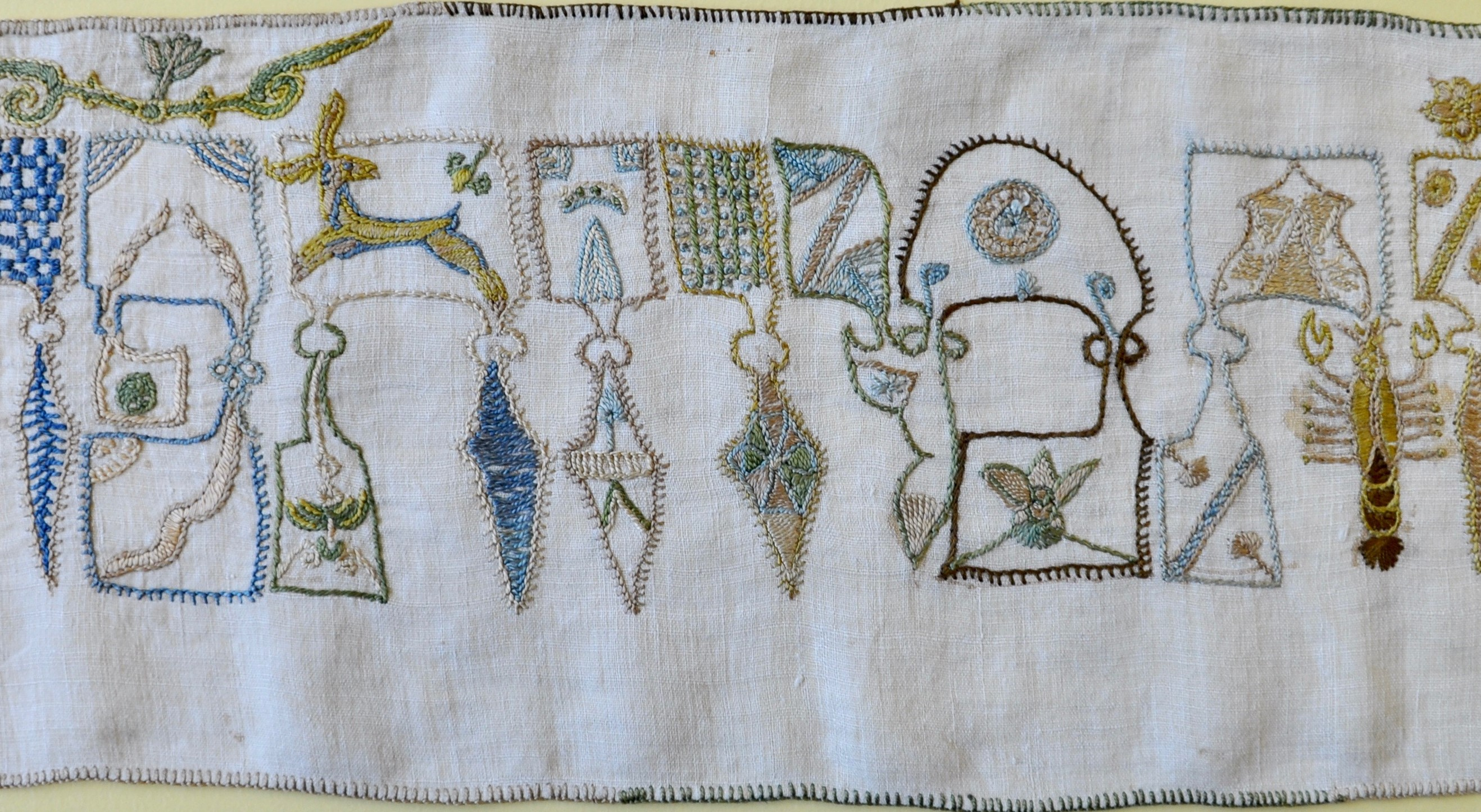
Deer and scorpion on a 1726 wimpel

On wimpels, the zodiac sign designates the constellation under which the child was born. Other animals may be linked to the aforementioned popular saying in the Mishnah, Pirkei Avot.

Deer may also give an indication of the child’s name: Zvi (Hebrew), Hirsch (German), Herschl (Yiddish).

=== Tree, plants, and flowers ===
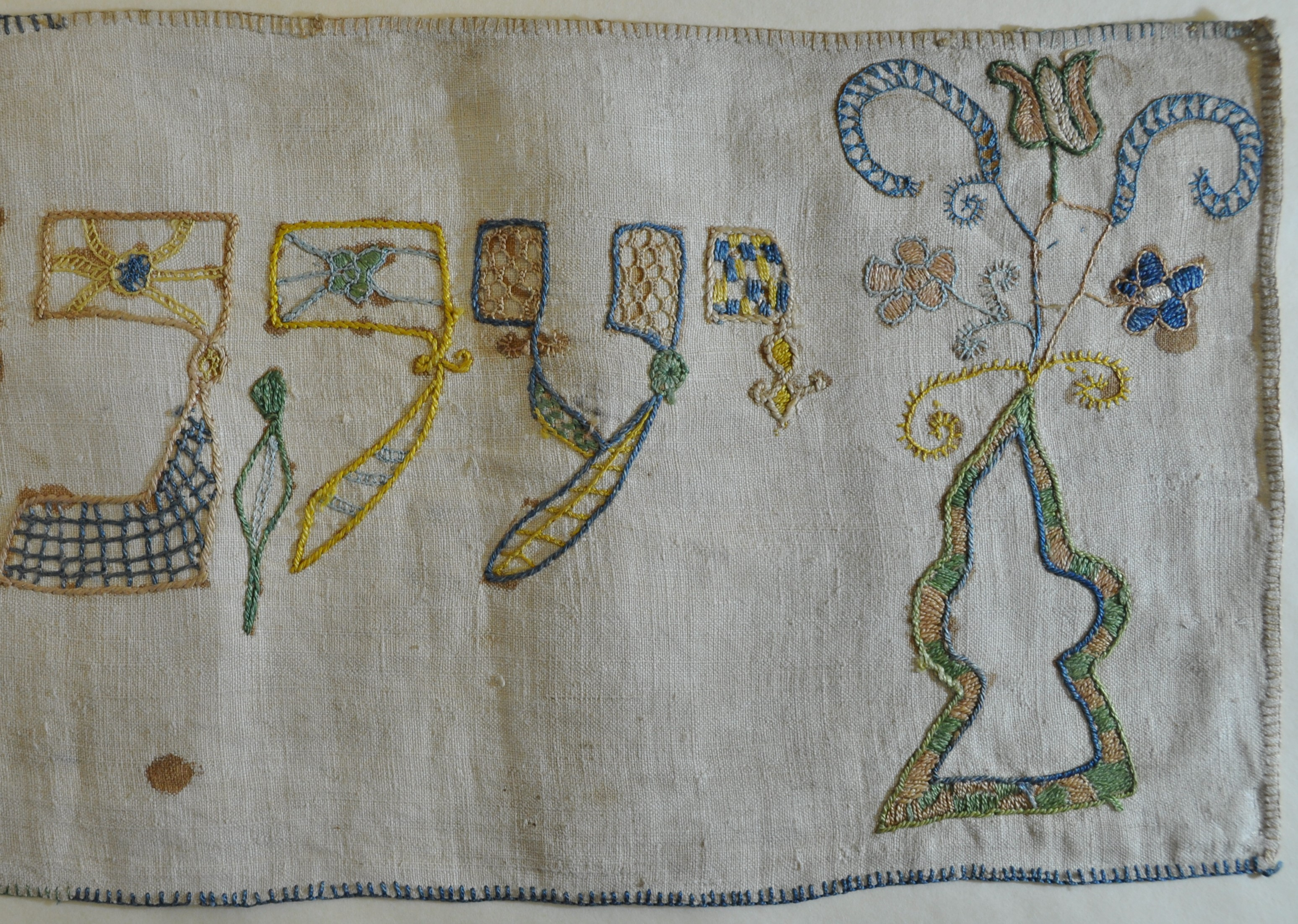
Flowers on a wimpel

The Torah is often equated with the “Tree of Life.” Depictions of plants, trees, or vases of flowers (as seen here) figuratively represent the connection between the child’s life and the Torah.

== Bringing the wimpel ==
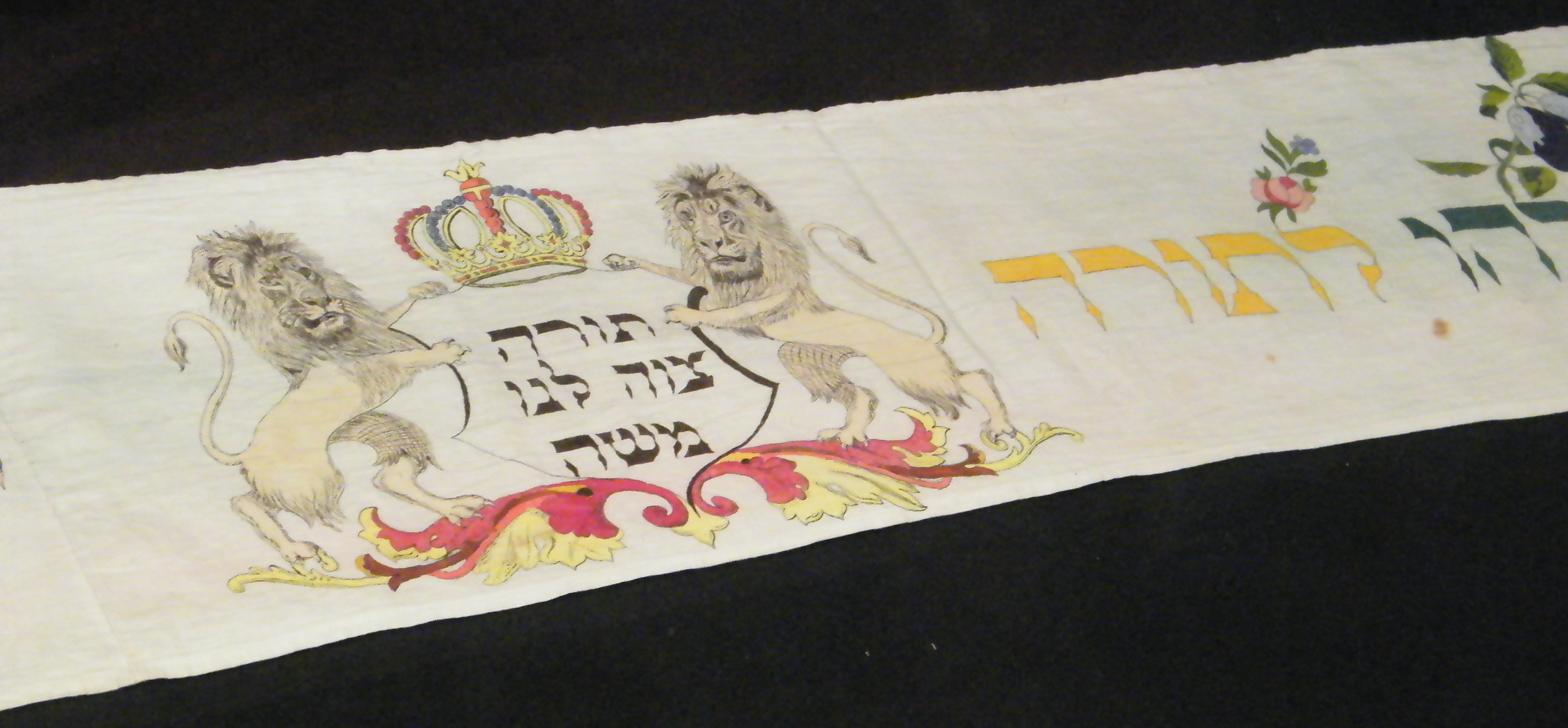
Wimpel painted on linen, Jewish Museum (New York)

When the child comes of age to begin learning Torah (age 3), he and his family bring the wimpel to the synagogue for Shabbat morning services. After the Torah reading, the child performs the ritual of gelila, perhaps with the help of his father, by wrapping the wimpel many times around the Torah scroll and tucking the end of the cloth into the folds. In this way, the child's individual responsibilities to God and His commandments are literally wrapped around his communal responsibilities, a figurative lesson for the child and his family.

Rabbi Shimon Schwab, Rav of Khal Adath Yeshurun synagogue in Washington Heights, New York, which revived the custom among the younger generation of Yekke congregants, suggested that perhaps the source of the wimpel custom was to avoid knotting and unknotting a tie around the Torah on Shabbat (see the 39 categories of activity prohibited on the Sabbath).

On that first Shabbat that the wimpel is presented and used, the child's family makes a kiddush in honor of their son's entering into a life of Torah.

== Other uses ==
The synagogue typically receives many more wimpels than Torah scrolls. The wimpels are often stored in a drawer in the Ark. A boy's wimpel would then be placed on the Torah on other special occasions in his life, such as his Bar Mitzvah, Aufruf, and other important family events.

Some wimpels were even used as a decorative banner on the chuppah itself.

== Lengnau Mappot ==
One of the most extensive collections of wimpels was found in the 1960s in the Surbtal in the Swiss canton of Aargau. The 218 textiles, which had been discovered in the women's gallery of the synagogue in Lengnau, span three centuries. The oldest one dates back to 1655. In 1967 the wimpels were examined by Dr. Florence Guggenheim-Grünberg. They are now part of the collection of the Jewish Museum of Switzerland.

== Bibliography ==
- Lubrich, Naomi (ed.), Birth Culture. Jewish Testimonies from Rural Switzerland and Environs, Basel 2022. ISBN 978-3796546075
- Ehrenfreund-Michler, Dinah: Wickelgeschichten. Die Lengnauer Tora-Wimpel. In: Bhend, Angela/Picard, Jacques: Jüdischer Kulturraum Aargau 2020, S. 212-214.
- Feuchtwanger-Sarig, Naomi: Torah Binders from Denmark. In: Gelfer-Jørgensen, Mirjam (Hg.): Danish Jewish Art. Jews in Danish Art. Kopenhagen 1999, S.382-435.
