= Jewish Museum of Switzerland =

Museum in Basel, Switzerland

Coordinates: 47.557625°N 7.583101°E

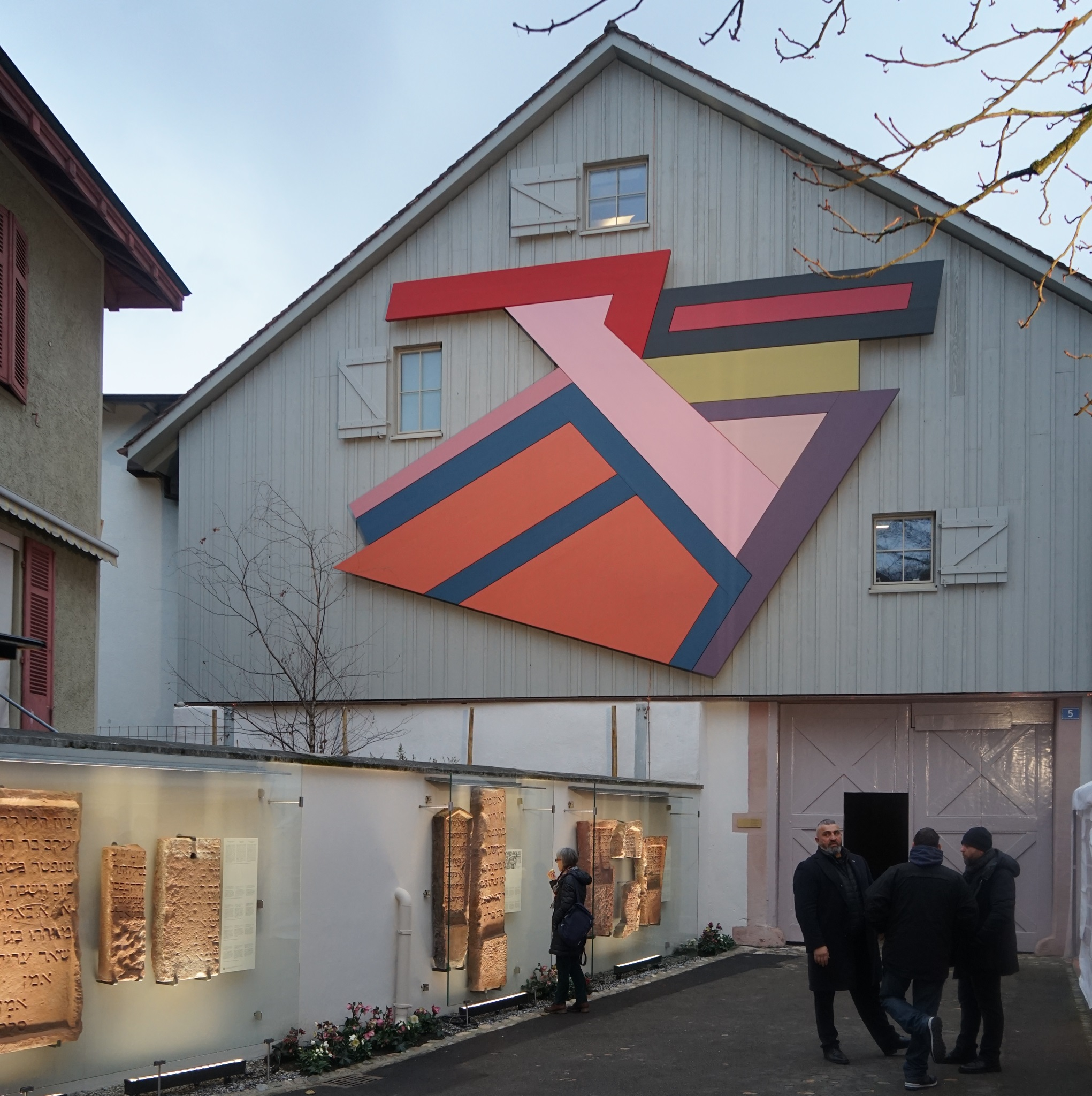
Jewish Museum Switzerland, Main Location Entrance

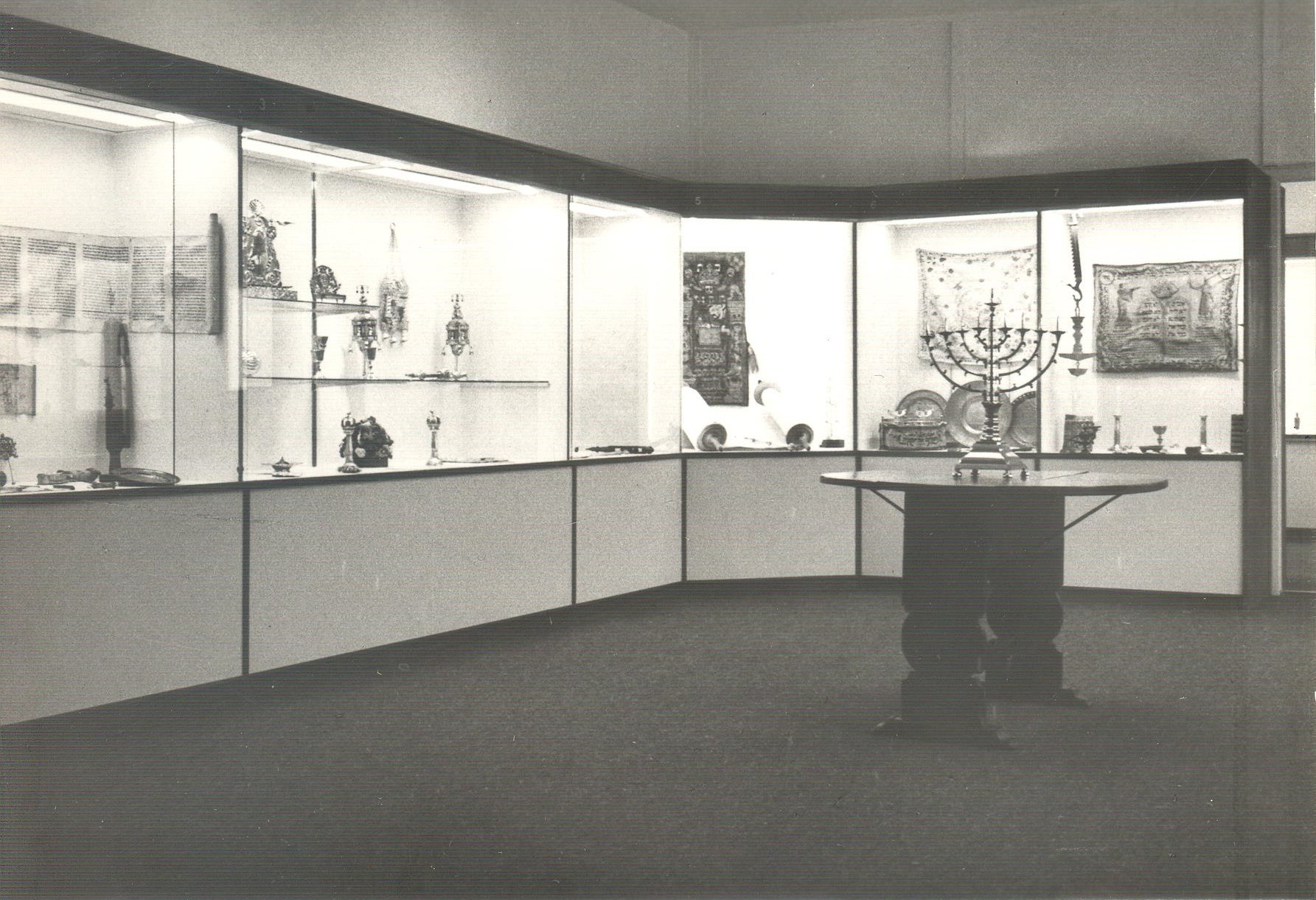
View of the permanent exhibition in 1966, Jewish Museum of Switzerland

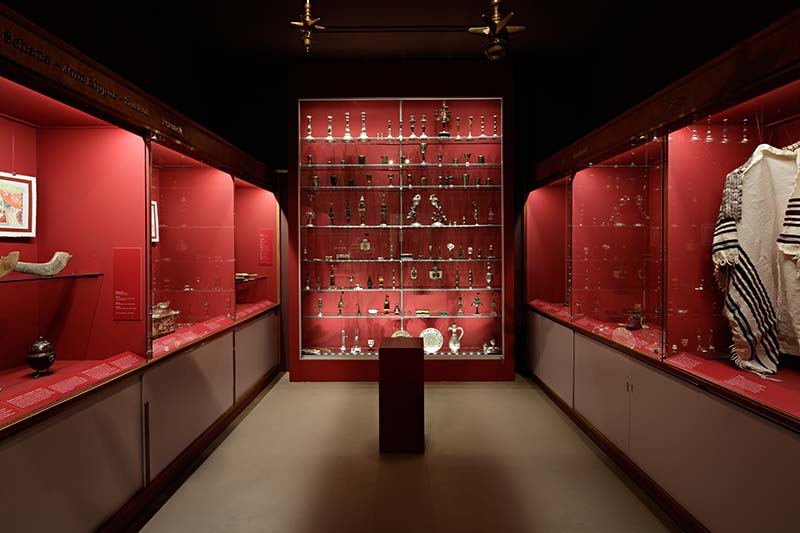
Exhibition room with religious objects

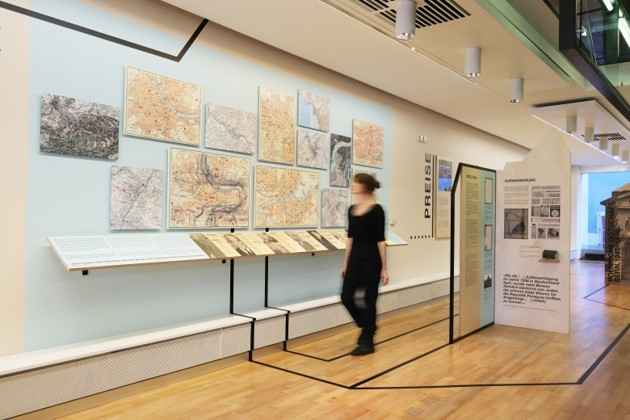
Special exhibition Pässe, Profiteure, Polizei in 2020

The Jewish Museum of Switzerland (German: Jüdisches Museum der Schweiz, French: Musée juif de Suisse, Italian: Museo ebraico della Svizzera) in Basel provides an overview of the religious and everyday history of the Jews in Basel and Switzerland using objects of ritual, art and everyday culture from the Middle Ages to the present.

== History ==
The museum opened in 1966 as the first Jewish museum in German-speaking Europe after the Second World War. The initiative came from members of Espérance (a chevra kadisha) who visited Cologne to see the exhibition "Monumenta Judaica" in 1963/64. They discovered that many of the ritual objects on display came from the Basel Judaica collection and decided to present these objects permanently in a Jewish museum in Basel.

When it first opened, the museum occupied two rooms at Kornhausgasse 8. The interior designer Christoph Bernoulli furnished the space in an "objective" style. The founding director, Dr. Katia Guth-Dreyfus, headed the museum for four decades. In 2010 she was succeeded by Dr. Gaby Knoch-Mund. In 2015, Dr. Naomi Lubrich took over as director of the Jewish Museum of Switzerland.

Since 2016, Lubrich has re-organized the permanent exhibit, attracted new visitors and gained the museum media attention.

In November 2025, the museum reopened at its new premises at Vesalgasse 5, 4051, which were designed by Diener & Diener.

In June 2026, the museum marked its 60th anniversary with a commemorative event.

== Collection ==
The first objects shown in the Jewish Museum's exhibition were Judaica collected by the Swiss Museum of Folklore (now Museum der Kulturen Basel). The museum's collection expanded after 1966 to include objects from Basel and the Upper Rhine, from the two Surbtal villages Endingen and Lengnau as well as from the remainder of Switzerland and Europe. A noteworthy find, when it comes to the Surbtal valley, are the "Lengnau Mappot", a collection of 218 Torah binders that span almost three centuries, making them the largest cohesive collection of mappot from a known community.

Highlights of the museum's collection include silver ceremonial objects, richly embroidered textiles from the 17th to the 20th centuries and documents from the cultural history of the Jews in Switzerland. The monumental medieval gravestones and the Basel Hebrew prints are important historical testimonies. Documents on the Basel Zionist Congresses and original letters from Theodor Herzl, the author of "Der Judenstaat", show Basel as a city that made world politics. The museum is also collecting contemporary objects — Judaica, art, and objects from everyday life.

Circumcision Bench
This circumcision bench (or brit milah bench) was carved in 1791 and entered the museum's collection in 1973. It is inscribed with words from the First Book of Moses: "You must circumcise the flesh of your foreskins, and it will be a symbol of the covenant between us. On the eighth day after birth, every male in every generation must be circumcised (Genesis 17:11)."
Collotype from the First Zionist Congress
The collotype process of the mid 19th century made it relatively easy to produce hundreds of photographs at a time. This collotype shows the 162 participants of the First Zionist Congress, which took place in Basel in 1897. While most participants were men, some women took part as well. Their photos are on the bottom row. Women were allowed to participate, but not to vote.
J-stamped Passport
On 30 December 1938, Agatha Süss's German passport was stamped with a "J" to mark her as Jewish. Because her daughter married a Swiss man, the 63-year old successfully procured a visa for Switzerland and was able to take up residence with her son-in-law in Basel, thus escaping the Holocaust.
Mappa from Lengnau
A mappa (or wimpel) is made from the cloth used to swaddle a newborn boy on his Brit Milah, thus connecting the communal world of the synagogue with the life of the individual. This embroidered wimpel made of coarse linen dates back to 1744 and belongs to the "Lengnau Mappot." The inscription reads: "Samuel, son of Meir, who was born under a good star on Friday, Shabbat evening, 2nd Kislew 5505, may he lead a life with the Torah, the Chuppah and good deeds, Amen Selah." Embroidered with colourful yarn, this wimpel depicts a vase of flowers. Symbolically it stands for the Torah, which is also seen as the tree of life.
Pocket Watch from La Chaux-de-Fonds
This silver and brass pocket watch was made by Jules Levy in La Chaux-de-Fonds in 1901, as can be deduced from the inscription: "Jules Levy. Chaux de Fonds. Tischri 5662. Mon cher oncle." Levy's "dear uncle" was Aron Rhein. Tishri is the first month of the Jewish calendar year, falling between September and October. The hour numerals are represented by Hebrew characters. The Jewish community of La Chaux-de-Fonds was founded in 1833 and quickly grew, counting circa 900 members in 1900, when the local watch manufacturing industry was at its peak.
Torah Mantle
This Torah mantle was found in the storage room of the synagogue in Endingen (AG) in 1967. The material was a French 18th century silk originally used as a ladies’ dress, perhaps even a wedding gown. It was repurposed as a Torah mantle, a controversial yet fairly common practice before the 20th century.
Torah Shrine from Solothurn
This "aron ha kodesh", or "holy shrine", was made for the former prayer room of the Jewish community of Solothurn (SO), inaugurated in 1893. The inscription reads: "Know before whom you stand!" The small Jewish community had to give up its prayer room in 1986, and the furnishings and objects were divided between the Jewish Community of Berne (BE) and the Jewish Museum of Switzerland.

== Exhibitions ==
1976: 10 Years Jewish Museum of Switzerland (10 Jahre Jüdisches Museum der Schweiz)

1999: Tefillin

1999–2000: Signs of the Zodiac (Tierkreiszeichen)

2000: The Rabbis Ris. A Family in the Region (Die Rabbiner Ris. Eine Familie in der Region)

2002: Mesusot

2002–2003: Dining on Shabbat (Speisen am Schabbat)

2003–2004: Jewish Wedding Contracts from the Braginsky Collection, Zurich (Jüdische Hochzeitsverträge aus der Braginsky Collection, Zürich)

2004–2005: Anne Frank. A Family History across Borders (Anne Frank. Eine Familiengeschichte über Grenzen)

2005–2006: Chest on the Move. A Jewish Family History from Frankfurt and Basel (Truhe auf Wanderschaft. Eine jüdische Familiengeschichte aus Frankfurt und Basel)

2006–2007: Bringing it into the Light. Acquisitions of the Last 10 Years (Ins Licht gerückt. Sammlungszugänge der letzten 10 Jahre)

2007–2008: Endingen-Lengnau. Traces of the Jewish Rural Communities in Aargau (Endingen-Lengnau. Auf den Spuren der jüdischen Landgemeinden im Aargau)

2009–2009: Strange. Objects that are out of Line (Merkwürdig. Objekte, die aus der Reihe tanzen)

2010–2016: Congratulations. Special Exhibition on the 150th Birthday of Theodor Herzl (HERZLichen Glückwunsch. Sonderausstellung zum 150. Geburtstag von Theodor Herzl )

2010–2014: "...and Hanna and Sarah" installation by Renée Levy („…und Hanna und Sarah" Installation von Renée Levy)

2011: From New Moon to Full Moon (Von Neumond zu Vollmond)

2011–2012: In Transition. Bar and Bat Mitzvah (Am Übergang. Bar und Bat Mitzwa)

2012: 1001 Amulet. Protection and Magic - Faith or Superstition? (1001 Amulett. Schutz und Magie – Glaube oder Aberglaube?)

2014–2016: Wanted. Found. Partnership and Love in Judaism (Gesucht. Gefunden. Partnerschaft und Liebe im Judentum)

2016: Swiss Jews. 150 Years of Equal Rights / Voices for Emancipation (Schweizer Juden. 150 Jahre Gleichberechtigung / Stimmen zur Emanzipation)

2016: Jubilee! The Jewish Museum of Switzerland turns 50 (Jubiläum! Das Jüdische Museum der Schweiz wird 50)

2017: Altland. Theodor Herzls European Heritage (Altland. Theodor Herzls europäisches Erbe)

2017: Art after Chagall. The Century after the Breakthrough (in cooperation with Kunstmuseum Basel) (Kunst nach Chagall. Das Jahrhundert nach dem Durchbruch (in Zusammenarbeit mit dem Kunstmuseum Basel))

2018–2019: The Diary. How Otto Frank Brought Anne's Voice from Basel to the World (Das Tagebuch. Wie Otto Frank Annes Stimme aus Basel in die Welt brachte)

2019: ISREALITIES. Seven Photographic Journeys (ISREALITIES. Sieben fotografische Reisen)

2019–2020: Passports, Profiteers, Police. A Swiss War Secret (Pässe, Profiteure, Polizei. Ein Schweizer Kriegsgeheimnis)

2020: Pandemics and Poetics. A Jewish Dictionary (online) (Pandemie und Poesie. Ein jüdisches Lexikon (online))

2021–2024: Literally Jewish: A lexicological history. Installation in the new location at Vesalgasse 5.

== Publications ==
2003: Jüdische Hochzeitsverträge aus Italien

2006: Truhe auf Wanderschaft. Eine jüdische Familiengeschichte aus Frankfurt und Basel

2006: Ins Licht gerückt. Sammlungszugänge der letzten 10 Jahre

2007: Endingen-Lengnau. Auf den Spuren der jüdischen Landgemeinden im Aargau

2010: HERZLichen Glückwunsch! Sonderausstellung zum 150. Geburtstag von Theodor Herzl

2011: Gaby Knoch-Mund et al., Am Übergang. Bar und Bat Mizwa. Wie werden jüdische Kinder und Jugendliche erwachsen? Basel. ISBN 9783033030251.

2013: 1001 Amulett. Schutz und Magie – Glaube oder Aberglaube

2014: Gaby Knoch-Mund, Gesucht. Gefunden. Partnerschaft und Liebe im Judentum, Basel. ISBN 9783033046337.

2018: Caspar Battegay, Naomi Lubrich, Jüdische Schweiz. 50 Objekte erzählen Geschichte / Jewish Switzerland: 50 Objects Tell their Stories, Basel, Christoph Merian Verlag. ISBN 978-3-85616-847-6

2020: Fabio Luks, CHAI – חי. Oder wenn Grabsteine vom Leben erzählen/CHAI - חי. Or when Gravestones Speak of Life, Biel, edition clandestin. ISBN 978-3-905297-99-7.

2020: Pandemie und Poesie. Ein jüdisches Lexikon. Pandemics and Poetics. A Jewish Dictionary. Biel, edition clandestin. ISBN 978-3907262085

2021: Naomi Lubrich: Passports, Profiteers, Police. A Swiss War Secret. edition clandestin ISBN 978-3-907262-09-2

2022: Naomi Lubrich (Ed.): Birth Culture: Artifacts from rural Switzerland and Environs. Schwabe Verlag, Basel. ISBN 978-3-7965-4607-5

2022: Naomi Lubrich (Ed.): What's in a Name? 25 Jewish Stories. edition clandestin, ISBN 978-3-907262-34-4

== See also ==
- Jews in Switzerland
- Lengnau Mappot
- Mohel book
- Museums in Basel
