= Gelila =

Gelila may refer to:

- Gelila, Ethiopia, a town in western Ethiopia
- Gelila (woreda), in southern Ethiopia
- Gelila, the rolling up of the Torah after a Torah reading
- Gelila Bekele, former partner of Tyler Perry, American filmmaker and actor

== See also ==
- Gelila Zakarias, an island in Lake Tana, Ethiopia
- Galila, an island in Lake Ziway, Ethiopia
