= Yamabushi =

Japanese mountain ascetic hermits

Yamabushi (山伏, one who prostrates oneself on the mountain) are Japanese mountain ascetic hermits. They are generally part of the syncretic shugendō religion, which includes Tantric Buddhism and Shinto.

Their origins can be traced back to the solitary yamabito (wild hill people) and some hijiri (聖) (wandering Buddhist renunciants) of the eighth and ninth centuries.

According to American writer Frederik L. Schodt:

These positively medieval-looking nature worshipers carry metal staves and conch shells and wear straw sandals and sometimes a hemp cloth over-robe with the Heart Sutra written on it. They follow a mixture of esoteric or tantric Buddhism mixed with Shinto, the native animistic religion of Japan.

== Clothing and items ==
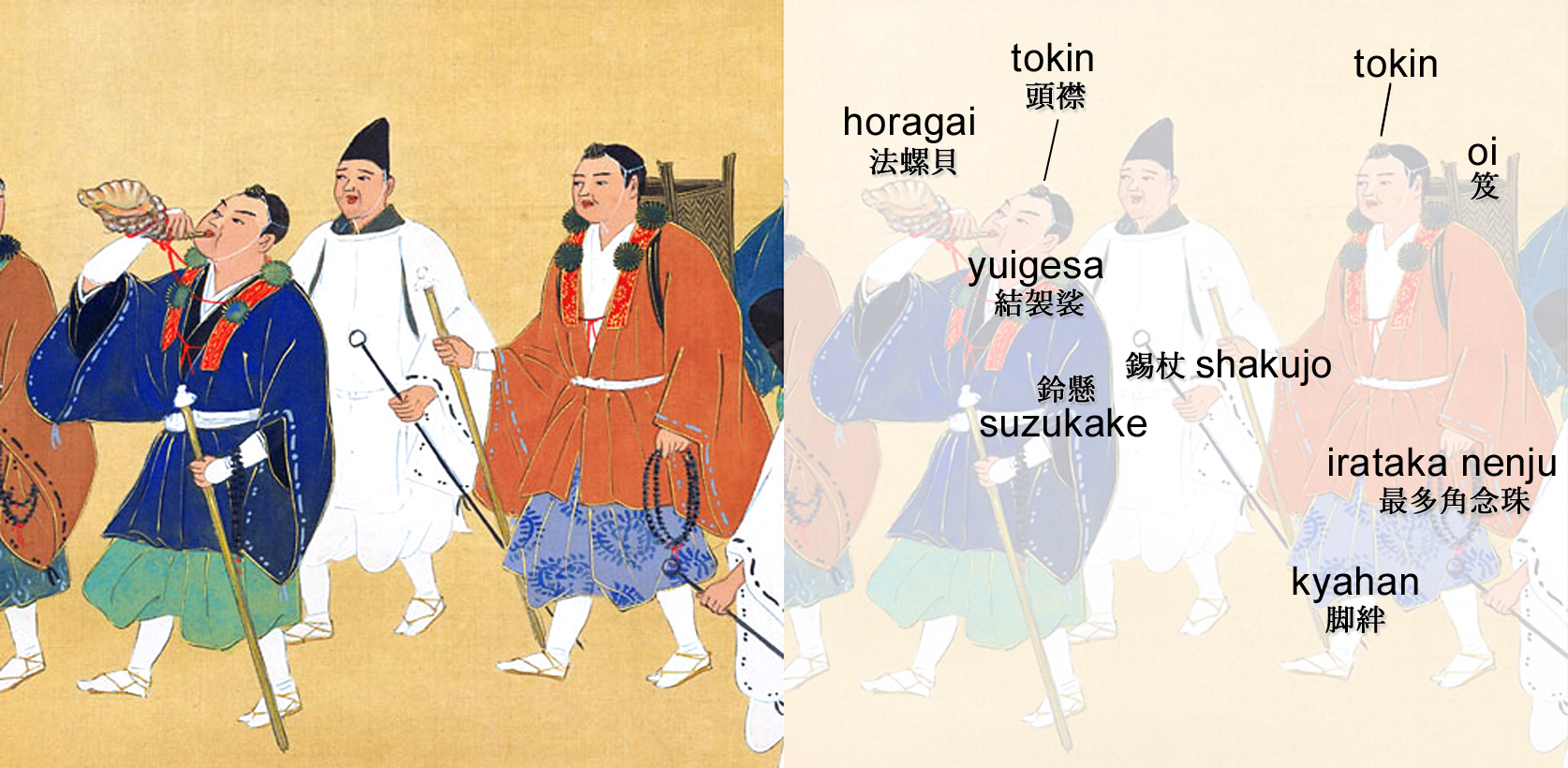
Appearance of the Yamabushi. They wear yuigesa, kyahan, and tokin. They hold a shakujō in their hands, and blow the horagai to ward off evil spirits.

The Yamabushi usually wear and bring the following clothes and items with them:

- Yuigesa (結袈裟), a harness or sash adorned with pom-poms
- Kyahan (脚絆), sandals made from straw
- Tokin (頭巾) which is a small hat-like adornment worn at the front of the head
- Shakujō (錫杖), a metal rod, held in their hands
- Oi (笈), backpack
- Horagai (法螺貝), a conch shell, which they blow like a horn to bind evil spirits

== See also ==
- Cunning folk
- Mount Ōfuna
- Rishi
- Shaolin Monastery
- Hericium erinaceus
