= Gaiter (disambiguation) =

Gaiters are garments worn on the legs.

Gaiter may refer to:

- Crus (lower leg)
- Bishop's Gaiters, sports teams at Bishop's University
- Neck gaiter, a warming garment worn on the neck, which can be pulled up over the mouth to keep out wind and sand

People:

- Dorothy Gaiter, wine columnist of The Wall Street Journal
- Donovan Tracy Gaiter, joint chief executive officer of Outcast Studios

== See also ==
- Gator (disambiguation)
- Gater (disambiguation)
