= Krok =

Krok or KROK or variants thereof, may refer to:

== People and legendary figures ==
- Duke Krok, the father of Libuše in Czech legend
- Kornelius Krok, pen name of Nikolay Borisov (1889-1937), Ukrainian writer
- Matthew Krok (born 1983), Australian child actor
- Morris Krok (1931–2005), South African writer
- Zygmunt Solorz-Żak (born Zygmunt Józef Krok in 1956), Polish businessman and media tycoon

== Places ==
- Krok, Wisconsin, an unincorporated community in the United States
- Krok Island, Kemp Land, Antarctica
- Krok Fjord, Princess Elizabeth Land, Antarctica
- Krok Lake, Princess Elizabeth Land, Antarctica
- 3102 Krok, an asteroid

== Other uses ==
- The Harvard Krokodiloes or the Kroks, Harvard's oldest a cappella group
- KROK International Animated Films Festival, a Russian / Ukrainian film festival
- KROK (FM), a radio station licensed to South Fort Polk, Louisiana, United States

== See also ==
- KROC (disambiguation)
- Kroc (surname)
- Krock (disambiguation)
- KROQ-FM, radio station in Greater Los Angeles, California, USA
