= Gater =

Gater may refer to:

- Gátér, village in Hungary
- Stargate fandom
- The Gater, WKGR, a classic rock format radio station in Florida, United States
- Gater (surname)

== See also ==
- Gadmeh Gater, village in Iran
- Gait (disambiguation)
- Gaiter (disambiguation)
- Gate (disambiguation)
- Gator (disambiguation)
