= Krock =

Krock or variant thereof may refer to:

== People ==
- Arthur Krock (1886-1974), U.S. journalist
- Gus Krock (1866-1905), U.S. baseball player
- Hendrick Krock (1671-1738), Danish painter

== Other uses ==
- K-Rock (radio station), a common radio brand which refers to a number of rock music radio stations
- Rogers K-Rock Centre, arena in Kingston, Ontario, Canada

== See also ==
- Crock (disambiguation)
- Kroc, surname
- KROC (disambiguation)
- Krok (disambiguation)
