= Croc =

Croc or CROC may refer to:

== Arts, entertainment, and media ==
=== Gaming ===
- Croc (game designer), a French video game designer
- Croc (series), a series of platformer video games.
  - Croc: Legend of the Gobbos, a 3D platform video game
  - Croc (2000 video game), a 2D sidescroller based on the above game

=== Other uses in arts, entertainment, and media ===
- Croc (film), a 2007 movie
- Croc (magazine), a Canadian French-language humour magazine (1979–1994)
- Croc, a novel by David James
- Killer Croc, a comic book character

== Brands and enterprises ==
- Crocs, a shoe maker

== Other uses ==
- Crocodile, a type of animal, in slang usage often called a "croc"
- Cardiff Roller Collective, a Welsh sports league
- Commandant Royal Observer Corps, a British military commander
- Confederación Revolucionaria de Obreros y Campesinos, a Mexican trade union
- Convention on the Rights of the Child, a United Nations treaty

== See also ==
- Crock (disambiguation)
- Crocodile Tears (disambiguation)
- Croque
- Gator (disambiguation)
- KROC (disambiguation)
