= Gator =

Gator is an abbreviation for alligator.

Gator may also refer to:

== People nicknamed Gator ==
- Mike Greenwell (1963–2025), American former Major League Baseball player nicknamed "The Gator"
- Ron Guidry (born 1950), former Major League Baseball pitcher
- Gator Hoskins (born 1991), American former football player
- Willis Jackson (saxophonist) (1932–1987), American jazz saxophonist
- Mark Rogowski (born 1966), professional skateboarder convicted of a 1991 murder

== Arts, entertainment, and media ==
=== Fictional characters ===
- Gator, a recurring character in Thomas & Friends
- Gabby Gator, an animated cartoon character, foe of Woody Woodpecker
- Wally Gator, the titular character of "Wally Gator", one of the segments from The Hanna-Barbera New Cartoon Series

=== Other uses in arts, entertainment, and media ===
- Gator (film), a 1976 action movie starring and directed by Burt Reynolds
- Gator (game), a swimming pool game
- "Gator", an instrumental track on the 1989 single "Homely Girl" by UB40
- KNGT, a radio station branded "Gator 99.5", licensed to Lake Charles, Louisiana

== Military ==
- AN/TPS-80 Ground/Air Task Oriented Radar (G/ATOR), a radar system in development by the United States Marine Corps
- Landing Vehicle Tracked used Amphibious warfare, popularly known as "gators" or "gator freighters"
- Boeing T-43, informally known as the Gator, modified Boeing 737 airplanes used for training navigators
- GATOR mine system, an American system of air-dropped anti-tank and anti-personnel mines developed in the 1980s

== Sports ==
- Gator, a defensive technique in volleyball popularized by Danny Kinda - see Volleyball jargon
- Gators, the athletics teams of St. Amant High School, Ascension Parish, Louisiana
- Gators, the athletics teams of Stone Ridge School of the Sacred Heart, a private school in Bethesda, Maryland
- Gators, the athletics teams of Chapin School, an all-girls day school in Manhattan, New York
- Gators, the athletics teams of Donald A Wilson Secondary School, Whitby, Ontario, Canada
- Gators, the athletics teams of Lakeshore Catholic High School, Port Colborne, Ontario
- Gators, the athletics teams of Crystal Lake South High School, Illinois
- Florida Gators, the University of Florida's athletic teams
- San Francisco State Gators, the athletics teams of San Francisco State University
- Wuhan Gators, a professional arena football team based in Wuhan, China

== Other uses ==
- Claria Corporation, formerly Gator Corporation, an Internet advertising company known for its Gator spyware
- John Deere Gator, a small utility vehicle
- Gator (facility), a low-background counting facility at the Laboratori Nazionali del Gran Sasso in Italy
- Gatorz Eyewear, a sunglasses brand

== See also ==
- Gaiter, a garment for the legs
- Gater (disambiguation)
- Alligator (disambiguation)
- Croc (disambiguation)
