= Tefillin =

Leather boxes containing Torah verses

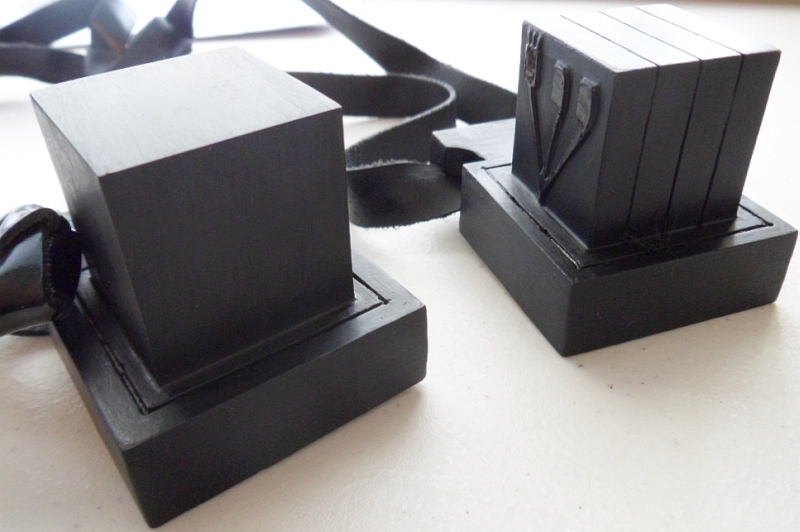
- A set of tefillin includes the arm-tefillah (left) and the head-tefillah

Halakhic texts relating to this article
- Torah: Exodus 13:9; Exodus 13:16; Deuteronomy 6:8; Deuteronomy 11:18
- Mishnah: Menachot 3:7
- Babylonian Talmud: Zevachim 37b; Sanhedrin 4b; Menachot 34b; Kiddushin 36a
- Mishneh Torah: Tefillin, Mezuzah, veSefer Torah ch 5-6
- Shulchan Aruch: Orach Chayim 25-48

Tefillin (Hebrew: תְּפִלִּין or תְּפִילִּין; Ashkenazi and Modern Israeli Hebrew pronunciation: [tfiˈlin]), or phylacteries, are sets of small black leather boxes with leather straps containing scrolls of parchment inscribed with verses from the Torah. Tefillin are traditionally worn by male adult Jews during Shacharit on weekdays.

In Orthodox and traditional Conservative Jewish (including Masorti) communities, they are worn solely by men; some Reform and Conservative communities allow Jewish adults to don tefillin regardless of gender. In Jewish law (Halakha), women are exempt from most time-dependent positive commandments (including the wearing of tefillin). Unlike as with other time-dependent positive commandments, most halakhic authorities rule that female Jews need not fulfill this commandment.

Tefillin is the plural form of tefillah (תְּפִלָּה) but oftentimes used as a singular collective noun. The arm tefillah (שֶׁל יָד, shel yad, 'of [the] hand') is placed on the upper (non-dominant) arm, and the strap wrapped around the forelimb, hand, and middle finger. The head tefillah (שֶׁל רֹאשׁ, shel rōsh, 'of [the] head') is placed between the eyes at the boundary of the forehead and hair. The tefillin are intended to fulfill the Torah's instructions to maintain a continuous "sign" and "remembrance" of the Exodus from Egypt. While historically, Jewish males wore tefillin all day, this is no longer common. The general practice today is to remove them following morning prayer services.

The biblical verses often cited as referring to tefillin are obscure. Deuteronomy 11:18, for instance, does not explicitly designate what to "bind upon [one's] arm", and the definition of "totafot between [one's] eyes" is not obvious. The details are expounded in the Oral Torah. At least as early as the 1st century CE, many Jews understood the biblical commandment to wear tefillin, and wore some form of it physically. This is shown in archaeological finds at Qumran, and a reference made in Matthew 23 of the Christian New Testament. However, Karaite Judaism understands the biblical commandment to be metaphorical.

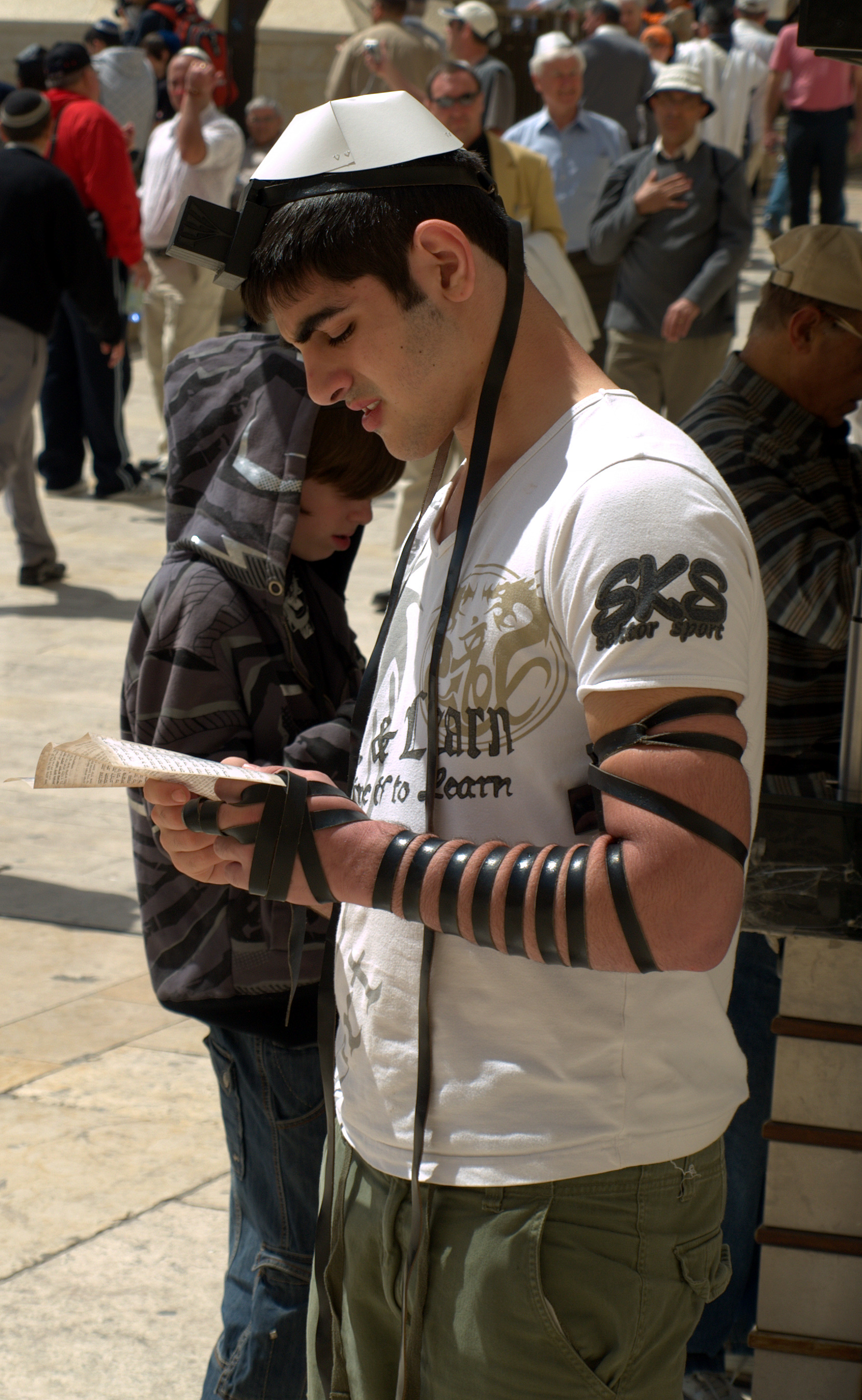
Man wearing arm- and head-tefillin at the Western Wall in 2009

== Biblical source ==
The obligation of tefillin is mentioned four times in the Torah: twice when recalling The Exodus from Egypt:

And it shall be for a sign for you upon your hand, and for a memorial between your eyes, that the law of the LORD may be in your mouth; for with a strong hand did the LORD bring you out of Egypt.

— Exodus 13:9

And it shall be for a sign upon your hand, and as totafot between your eyes; for with a mighty hand did the LORD bring us forth out of Egypt.

— Exodus 13:16

and twice in the Shema passages:

And you shall bind them as a sign upon your arm, and they shall be as totafot between your eyes.

— Deuteronomy 6:8

You shall put these words of mine on your heart and on your soul; and you shall tie them for a sign upon your arm, and they shall be as totafot between your eyes.

— Deuteronomy 11:18

== Etymology ==
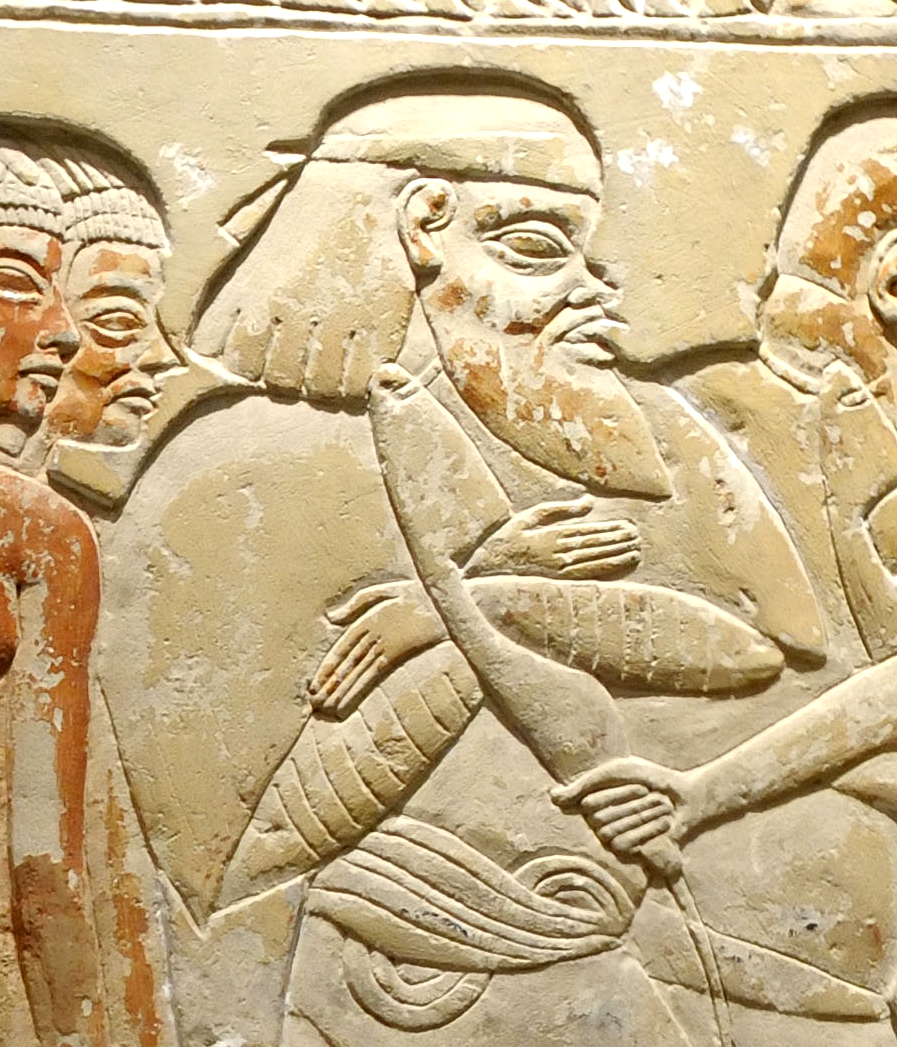
Levantine man wearing arm wrappings and a headband similar to tefillin (c. 1300 BCE, Tomb of Horemheb in Saqqara)

In the Hebrew Bible, tefillin are referred to as טֹוטָפֹת (ṭoṭaphoth), the plural of טוֹטֶפֶת (ṭoṭepheth), meaning "headband" or "frontlet". Jeffrey H. Tigay argued that the word טוֹטֶפֶת originally meant "headband", as ornamental bands encircling the head were common among Levantine populations in the Hebrew Biblical period. The scholarly consensus is that טוֹטֶפֶת is derived from a reduplicated root ṭ-p-ṭ-p (ט-פ-ט-ף) meaning "to encircle" (related to the Arabic ṭāfa, "go around" or "encircle") with the feminine suffix -t.

Rabbi Akiva, in Sanhedrin 4b, argued the word טוֹטֶפֶת (ṭoṭepheth) to be a combination of two foreign words: Tot meant "two" in the Coptic (Note: Variant: Gadpi) language and Fot meant "two" in the "Afriki" language, hence, tot and fot means "two and two", corresponding to the four compartments of the head tefillah. This would appear to be an early attempt at etymology. Menahem ben Saruq explains that the word is derived from the Hebrew ve'hateif and tatifoo, both expressions meaning "speech"—"for when one sees the tefillin it causes him to remember and speak about the Exodus from Egypt".

The first texts to use the word תְּפִלִּין (tefillin) are the Targumim and Peshitta, and it is also used in subsequent Talmudic literature. תְּפִלִּין is the Mishnaic Hebrew plural of תְּפִלָּה (tefillah), used in the Rabbinic literature to individuate a single phylactery. Marcus Jastrow connects תְּפִלִּין with the Syriac תפלתא ("attachments" or "hangings"), thus tefillin would represent the Aramaic equivalent of טוֹטֶפֶת (ṭoṭepheth). Its resemblance to Hebrew tefillah ("prayer") is wholly coincidental.

The English word "phylactery" (pl. "phylacteries") derives from Ancient Greek φυλακτήριον phylaktērion (pl. φυλακτήρια phylaktēria), meaning "guarded post, safeguard, security", and in later Greek, "amulet" or "charm". The word "phylactery" occurs once (in ACC PL) in the Greek New Testament, whence it has passed into the languages of Europe. But neither Aquila nor Symmachus uses "phylacteries" in their translations.

== Purpose ==
The tefillin are to serve as a reminder of God's intervention at the time of the Exodus from Egypt. Maimonides recorded details of the sanctity of tefillin and wrote that "as long as the tefillin are on the head and on the arm of a man, he is modest and God-fearing and will not be attracted by hilarity or idle talk; he will have no evil thoughts, but will devote all his thoughts to truth and righteousness". The Sefer ha-Chinuch (14th century) adds that the purpose of tefillin is to help subjugate a person's worldly desires and encourage spiritual development. Joseph Caro (16th century) explains that tefillin are placed on the arm adjacent to the heart and on the head above the brain to demonstrate that these two major organs are willing to perform the service of God.

Many have the custom to have high-quality tefillin and beautiful tefillin bags as a hiddur mitzvah. This idea comes from the verse "This is my God and I will glorify Him" (Exodus 15:2). The Jewish Sages explain: "Is it possible for a human being to add glory to his Creator? What this really means is: I shall glorify Him in the way I perform mitzvot. I shall prepare before Him a beautiful lulav, beautiful sukkah, beautiful fringes (Tzitzit), and beautiful phylacteries (Tefilin)."

Some non-Orthodox scholars think that tefillin may play an apotropaic function. For instance, Yehudah B. Cohn argues that the tefillin should be perceived as an invented tradition aimed at counteracting the popularity of the Greek amulets with an "original" Jewish one. Joshua Trachtenberg considered every ornament worn on the body (whatever its declared function) as initially serving the purpose of an amulet.

In addition, the early Rabbinic sources furnish more or less explicit examples of the apotropaic qualities of tefillin. For instance, Numbers Rabbah 12:3 presents tefillin as capable of defeating "a thousand demons" emerging on "the left side", rabbis Yohanan and Nahman used their sets to repel the demons inhabiting privies, whereas Elisha the Winged, who was scrupulous in performing this mitzvah, was miraculously saved from the Roman persecution. Also, tefillin are believed to possess life-lengthening qualities, and they are often listed in one breath among various items which are considered amuletic in nature. Though tefillin are sometimes mentioned together with amulets in the Talmud due to certain similarities of form, they are never identified as such, but specifically differentiated from them.

== Manufacture and contents ==
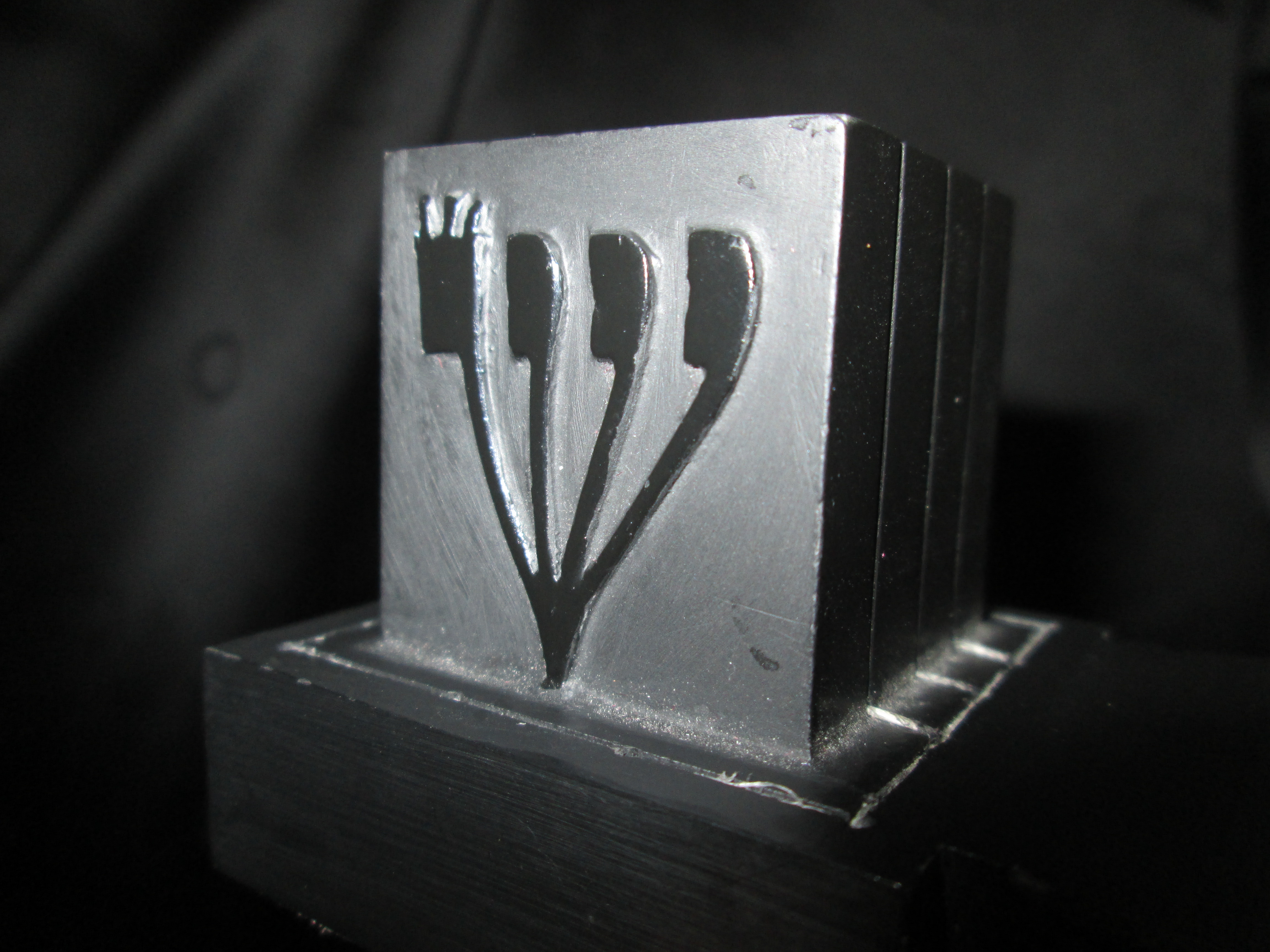
Ashkenazi head tefillin, Jerusalem, Israel

Leather moulded into shape for the head-tefillin

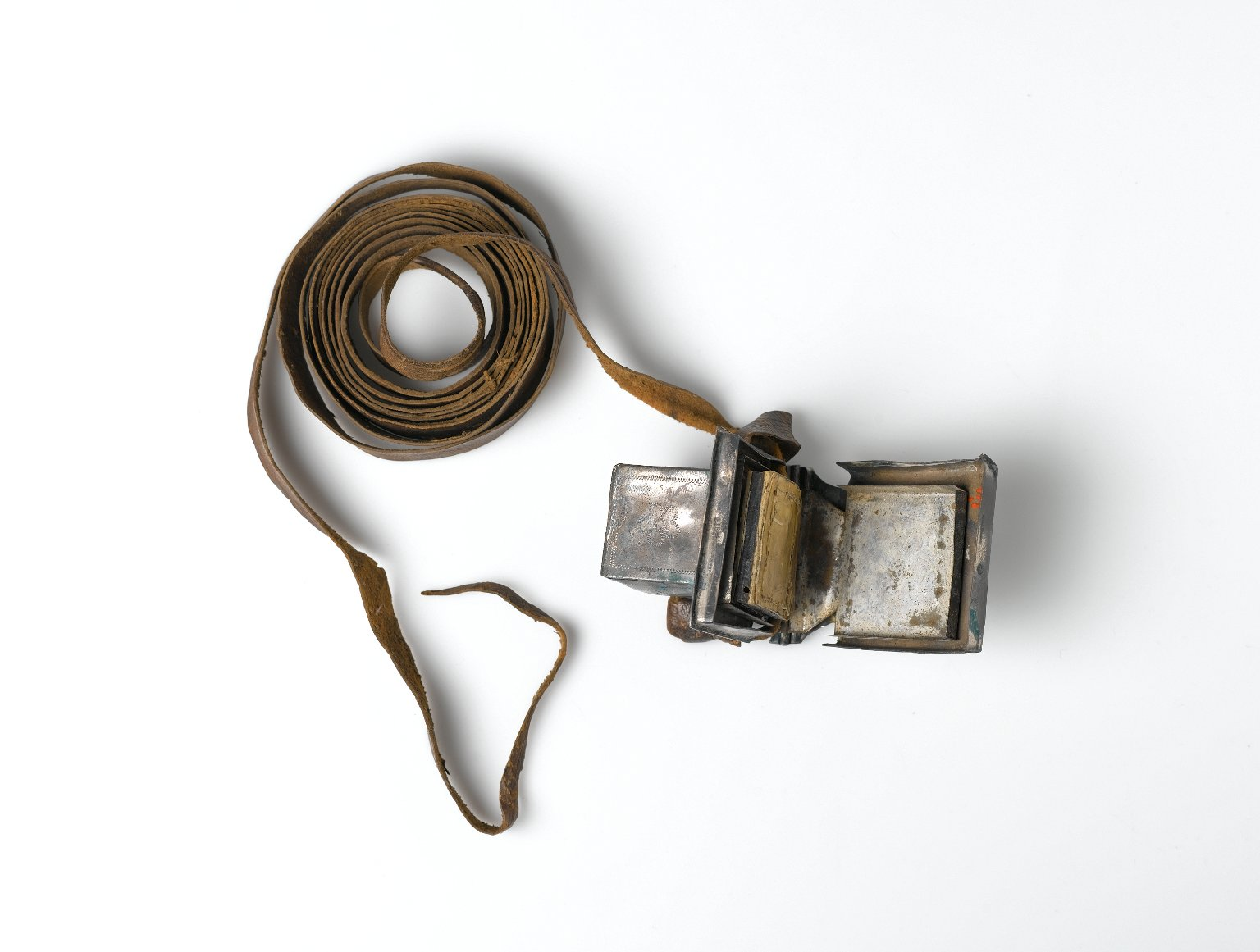
Silver and leather teffilin case made in Germany in 1885

The manufacturing processes of tefillin are intricate and governed by hundreds of detailed rules.

=== Boxes ===
In earlier Talmudic times, tefillin were either cylindrical or cubical, but later the cylindrical form became obsolete. Nowadays the boxes should be fashioned from a single piece of animal hide and form a base with an upper compartment to contain the parchment scrolls. They are made in varying levels of quality. The most basic form, called peshutim ("simple"), are made using several pieces of parchment to form the inner walls of the head tefillin. The higher quality tefillin, namely dakkot ("thin"), made by stretching a thin piece of leather, and the more durable gassot ("thick") are both fashioned from the single piece of hide.

The main box which holds the tefillin scrolls, known as ketzitzah (קציצה), is cubical. Below it is a wider base known as the titura (תיתורא). At the back of the titura is a passageway (ma'avarta, מעברתא) through which the tefillin strap is threaded, to tie the tefillin in place.

On both sides of the head-tefillin, the Hebrew letter shin (ש) is moulded; the shin on the wearer's left side has four branches instead of three.

Nowadays it is customary to paint the tefillin black, but archaeological findings show that it is not certain that it was always this way.

=== Straps ===
Black leather straps (retsu'ot) pass through the rear of the base and are used to secure the tefillin onto the body. The knot of the head-tefillin strap forms the letter dalet (ד) or double dalet (known as the square-knot) while the strap that is passed through the arm-tefillin is formed into a knot in the shape of the letter yud (י). Together with the shin on the head-tefillin box, these three letters spell Shaddai (שדי), one of the names of God.

The straps must be black on their outer side, but may be any color except red on their inner side. A stringent opinion requires them to be black on the inner side too, but more commonly the inner side is left the color of leather.

The Talmud specifies that tefillin straps must be long enough to reach one's middle finger, and records the practice of Rav Aha bar Jacob to tie and then "matleit" (plait? wind three times?) them. However, the passage leaves unclear where the measuring is done from, whether the reference is to hand- or head-tefillin, and what exactly the meaning of "matleit" is. Combining and interpreting the Talmud's statements, Maimonides, Tur, and Shulchan Aruch ruled that the strap of hand-tefillin must reach from where the tefillin is placed on the arm, as far as the middle finger, where it must be wound three times around the middle finger. Rema wrote that it is not necessary to wind around the finger (rather, the straps must be long enough that one could wind around the finger); however, this leniency does not appear in his comments to the Shulchan Aruch. In addition to the windings around the finger, the Shulchan Aruch states that the custom is to wind six or seven times around the forearm.

=== Parchment scrolls ===
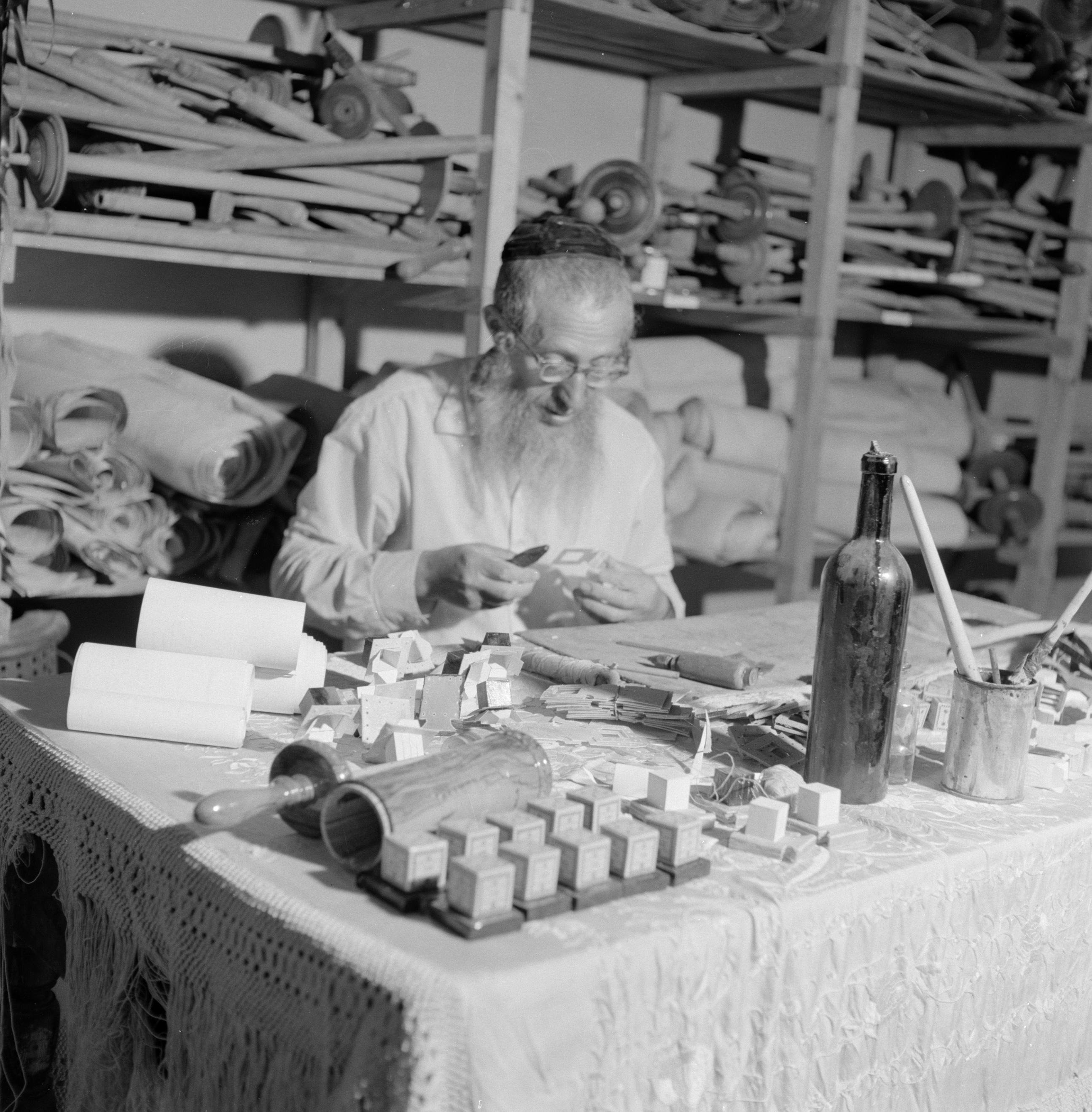
Man makes boxes for tefillin, Jerusalem, 1964

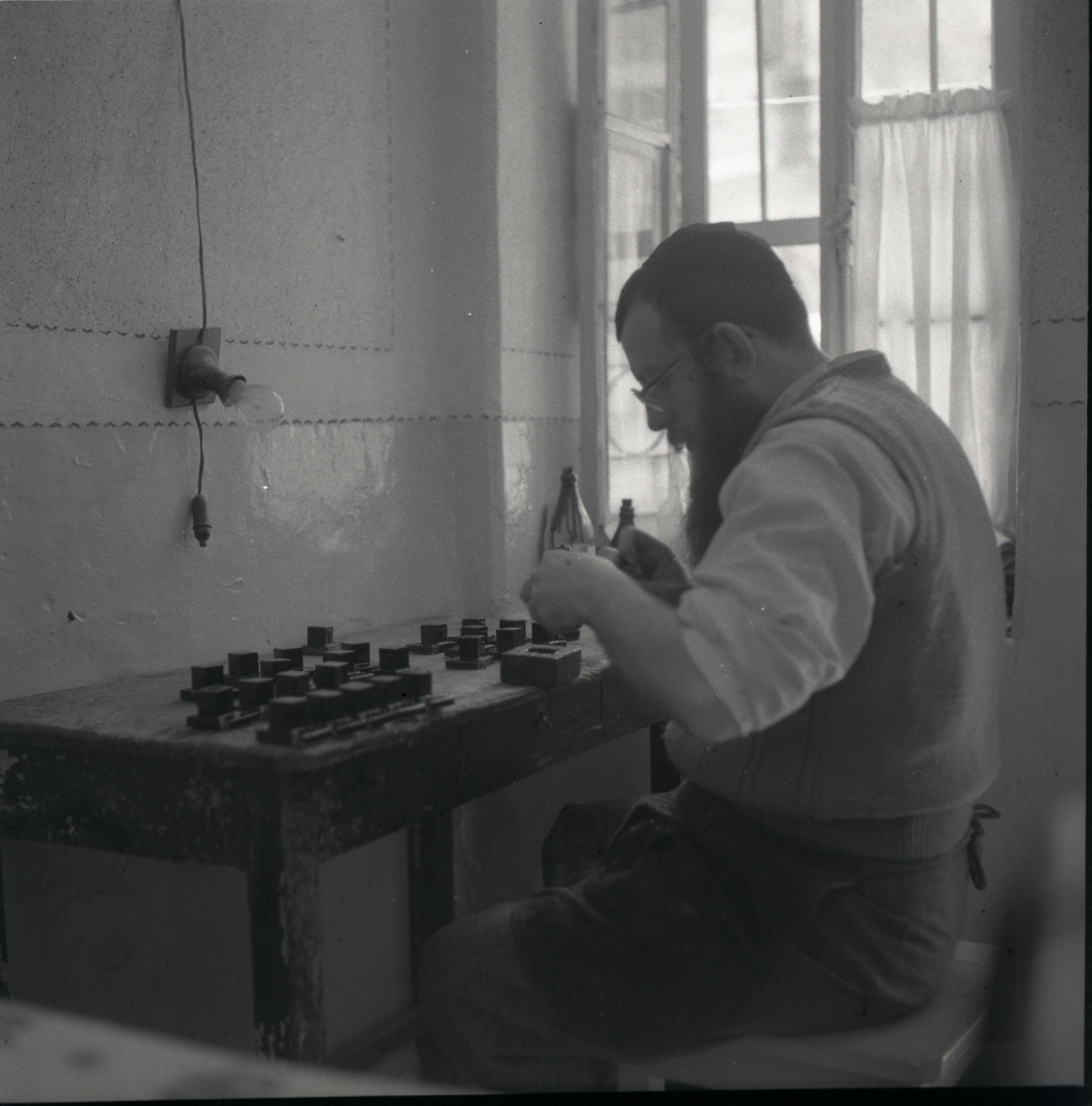
Man makes tefillin, Jerusalem, 1949. Photo by Boris Carmi

The four biblical passages which refer to the tefillin, mentioned above, are written on scrolls and placed inside the leather boxes. The arm-tefillin has one large compartment, which contains all four biblical passages written upon a single strip of parchment; the head-tefillin has four separate compartments in each of which one scroll of parchment is placed. This is because the verses describe the hand-tefillin in the singular ("sign"), while in three of four verses, the head-tefillin is described in the plural ("totafot").

The passages are written by a scribe with special ink on parchment scrolls (klaf). These are: "Sanctify to me ..." (Exodus 13:1–10); "When YHWH brings you ..." (Exodus 13:11–16); "Hear, O Israel ..." (Deuteronomy 6:4–9); and "If you observe My Commandments ..." (Deuteronomy 11:13-21). The Hebrew Ashuri script must be used and there are three main styles of lettering used: Beis Yosef – generally used by Ashkenazim; Arizal – generally used by Hasidim; Velish – used by Sefardim.

The texts have to be written with halachically acceptable (acceptable according to Jewish law) ink on halachically acceptable parchment. There are precise rules for writing the texts and any error invalidates it. For example, the letters of the text must be written in order - if a mistake is found later, it cannot be corrected as the replacement letter would have been written out of sequence. There are 3188 letters on the parchments, and it can take a sofer (scribe) as long as 15 hours to write a complete set.

A 2025 microscopic and spectroscopic study of 26 ancient tefillin slips from the Judaean Desert found that all were written on exceptionally thin pieces comprising the papillary layer of the animal dermis.

==== Ordering of scrolls (Rashi and Rabbeinu Tam tefillin) ====
Talmudic commentators debated the order in which scrolls should be written in the hand tefillin and inserted into the four compartments of the head-tefillin. Rashi held that the passages are placed according to the chronological order as they appear in the Torah (Kadesh Li, Ve-haya Ki Yeviehcha, Shema, Ve-haya Im Shemoa), while according to Rabbeinu Tam, the last two passages are switched around. There are two additional opinions of the Shimusha Rabba and the Raavad, who hold that like Rashi and Rabbeinu Tam respectively, but they hold that the scrolls are placed in the head tefillin in mirror image of those opinions.

It is often claimed that of the tefillin dating from the 1st century CE discovered at Qumran in the Judean Desert, some were made according to the order understood by Rashi and others in the order of Rabbeinu Tam; however, they in fact do not follow either opinion.

Nowadays, the prevailing custom is to arrange the scrolls according to Rashi's view, but some pious Jews are also accustomed to briefly lay the tefillin of Rabbeinu Tam as well, a custom of the Ari adopted by the Hasidim, many Sephardic communities, and individuals within the Ashkenazic community. The Vilna Gaon, who wore the tefillin of Rashi, rejected the stringency of also laying Rabbeinu Tam, pointing out that there were 64 possible arrangements of the tefillin scrolls, and it would not be practical to put on 64 different sets of tefillin to account for all possibilities. The Shulchan Aruch rules that only "one who is known and famous for his piety" should put on Rabbeinu Tam tefillin, while the Mishnah Brurah explains that if any other person puts on Rabbeinu Tam tefillin, it is a sign of arrogance.

The placement of the protrusion of a tuft of calf hairs (se'ar eigel) identifies as to which opinion the tefillin were written.

== Obligation and gender ==
The legal duty of laying tefillin rests solely upon Jewish males above the age of thirteen years, women are exempt from this obligation. Since at least the time of Rema in the 16th century, the prevalent practice among religious Jews has strongly discouraged women from wearing tefillin.

The codes view the commandment of tefillin as important, and call those who neglect to observe it "transgressors". Maimonides counts the commandment of laying the arm-tefillin and head-tefillin as two separate positive mitzvot. The Talmud cites Rav Sheshet, who said that by neglecting the precept, one transgresses eight positive commandments. A report of widespread laxity in its observance is reported by Moses of Coucy in 13th-century Spain. It may have arisen from the fear of persecution, similar to what had occurred to the Jews living in the Land of Israel under Roman rule in the second century, or possibly due to expense, lack of skill in manufacture, or other social pressures upon Jews in the middle ages.

A mourner during the first day of his mourning period is exempt from wrapping tefillin; according to Talmudic law, a bridegroom on his wedding-day is also exempt, but this later exemption is not practiced today. The reason for these exemptions is that the wearer of tefilin must have a constant state of mind intent on the commandment of tefilin, and distractions due to recent death or marriage would be problematic. A sufferer from stomach-trouble who thus can not maintain a clean body, or one who is otherwise in pain and cannot concentrate their mind is also exempt. One who is engaged in the study of the Law and scribes of and dealers in tefillin and mezuzahs while engaged in their work if it cannot be postponed, are also free from this obligation.

Historically, the mitzvah of tefillin was not performed by women, but the ritual was possibly kept privately by some women in medieval France and Germany. It has been popularly claimed that Rashi's daughters (12th century) and the wife of Chaim ibn Attar (18th century) wore tefillin, but there is no historical evidence to back these claims. There was never a widely accepted practice of women wearing tefillin prior to 20th century progressive Judaism, though historical sources suggest it was done in some communities prior to the advent of progressive Judaism.

In modern times, men have not been the only ones to elect to wear tefillin. Within the Orthodox movement, it remains a male-only religious obligation, but in egalitarian movements women might opt to observe this practice as a social statement. Women affiliated with the Conservative movement often wrap tefillin. Since 2013, SAR High School in Riverdale, New York, has allowed girls to wrap tefillin during morning prayer; it is probably the first Modern Orthodox high school in the U.S. to do so. The wearing of tefillin by members of Women of the Wall at the Western Wall caused consternation from the rabbi in charge of the site until a Jerusalem District Court judge ruled in 2013 that doing so was not a violation of "local custom". In 2018, a group of students from Hebrew College, a non-denominational rabbinical school in Boston, created a series of YouTube videos to help female and transgender Jews learn how to wrap tefillin.

== Use ==
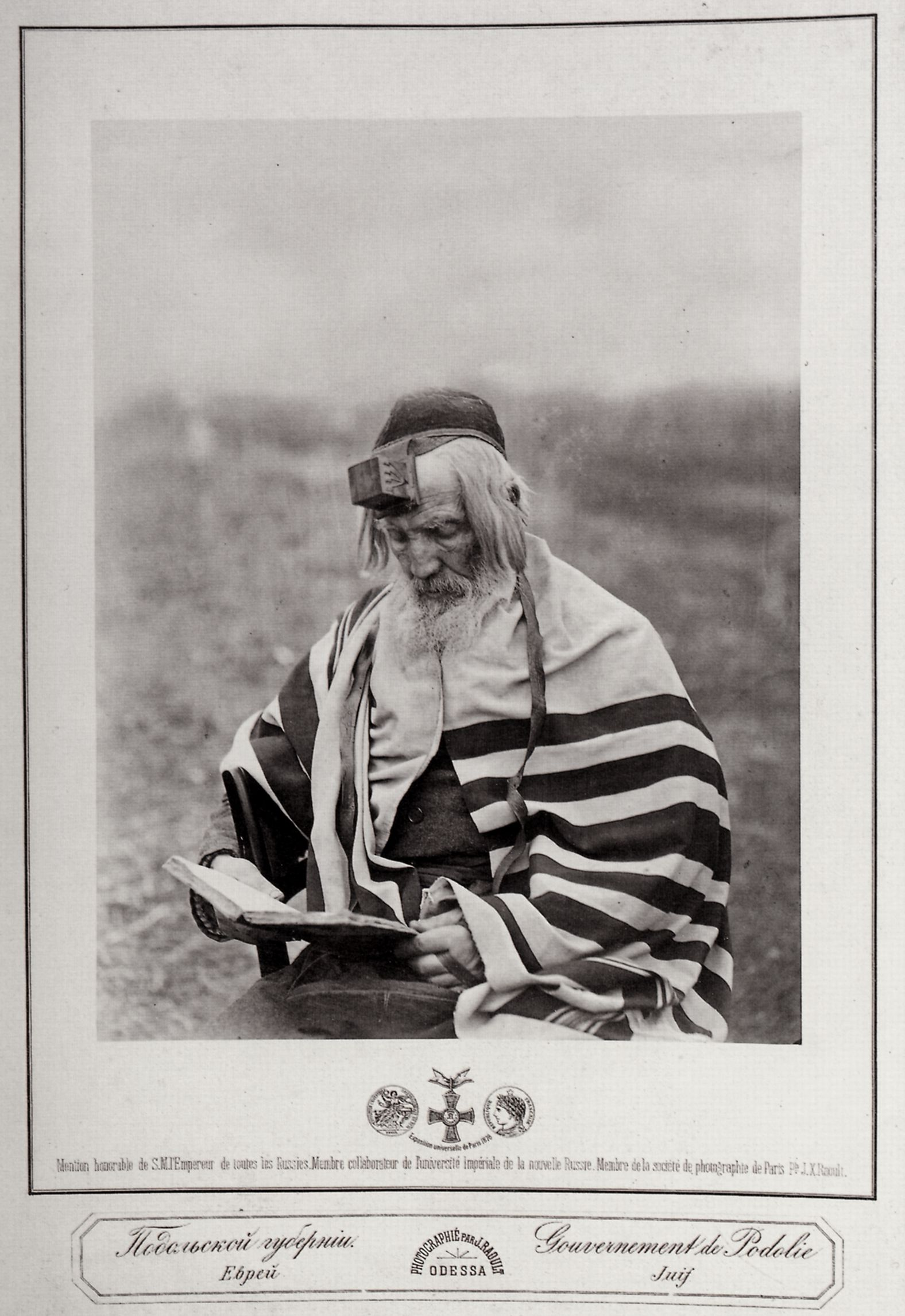
Old man with a tefillin in Podolsk, c. 1870–1880

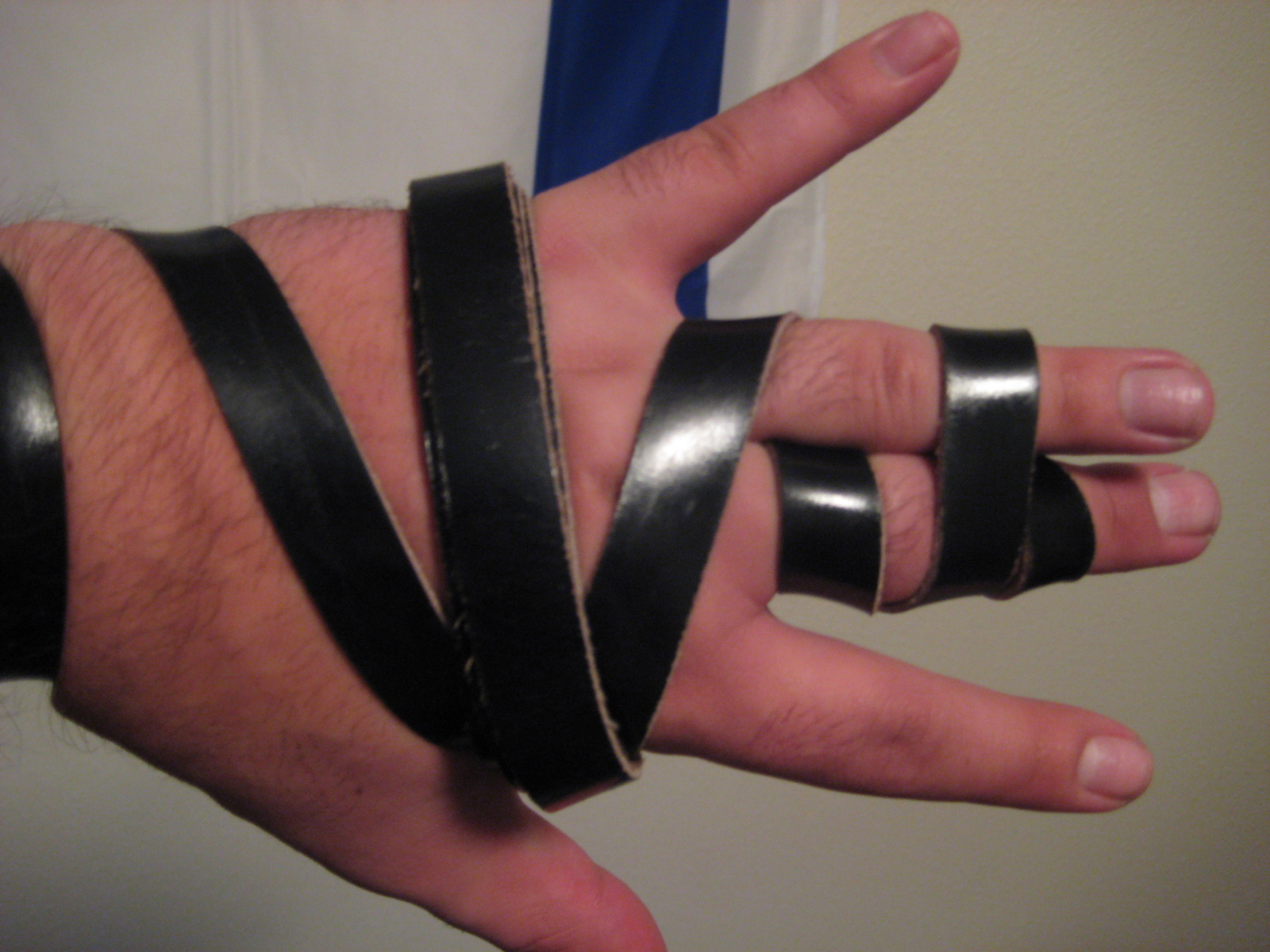
Arm-tefillin with ש (shin) pattern, according to one of the Ashkenazi opinions

Sometimes tefillin were worn all day, but not during the night. Nowadays the prevailing custom is to wear them only during the weekday morning service, although some individuals wear them at other times during the day as well. Observant Jews make a tremendous effort to don Tefillin at the appropriate time every morning, even in crowded airports. Tefillin are not donned on Shabbat and the major festivals because these holy days are themselves considered "signs" which render the need of the "sign" of tefillin superfluous.

On the fast day of Tisha B'Av, Ashkenazim and some Sephardim do not wear tefillin during the morning (Shacharit) service and they are worn instead at the afternoon service (Mincha). Other Sephardim (following the Kabbalah) wear tefillin at Shacharit as usual.

=== Chol HaMoed ===
On Chol HaMoed (intermediate days) of Pesach and Sukkot, there is a great debate among the early halachic authorities as to whether tefillin should be worn or not. Those who forbid it consider the "sign" of intermediate days as having the same status as the festival itself, making the ritual of tefillin redundant. Others argue and hold that Chol HaMoed does not constitute a "sign" in which case tefillin must be laid. Three customs evolved resulting from the dispute:

- To refrain from wearing tefillin: This ruling of the Shulchan Aruch is based on kabbalah and the Zohar which strongly advocate refraining from laying tefillin on Chol HaMoed. This position is maintained by Sephardic Jews and is also the opinion of the Vilna Gaon whose ruling has been almost universally accepted in Israel.
- To wear tefillin without reciting the blessings: This is the opinion of, among others, Rabbi Jacob ben Asher (Ba'al ha-Turim), Rabbi Moses of Coucy (Semag) and Rabbi David HaLevi Segal (Turei Zahav). The advantage of this compromise is that one avoids the transgressions of either not donning tefillin or making a blessing in vain.
- To wear tefillin and recite the blessings in an undertone: This opinion is the ruling of Moses Isserles who writes that this is the universally accepted practice among Ashkenazic Jews. However it may have been in his time, this is no longer universally the case, since many Ashkenazim refrain from wearing it or wear it without a blessing during Chol HaMoed.

In light of the conflicting opinions, the Mishna Berura (early 20th-century), following the second compromise practice above, recommends Ashkenazim make the following stipulation before donning tefillin: "If I am obligated to don tefillin I intend to fulfill my obligation and if I am not obligated to don tefillin, my doing so should not be considered as fulfilling any obligation" and that the blessing not be recited.

=== Laws and customs regarding putting on tefillin ===
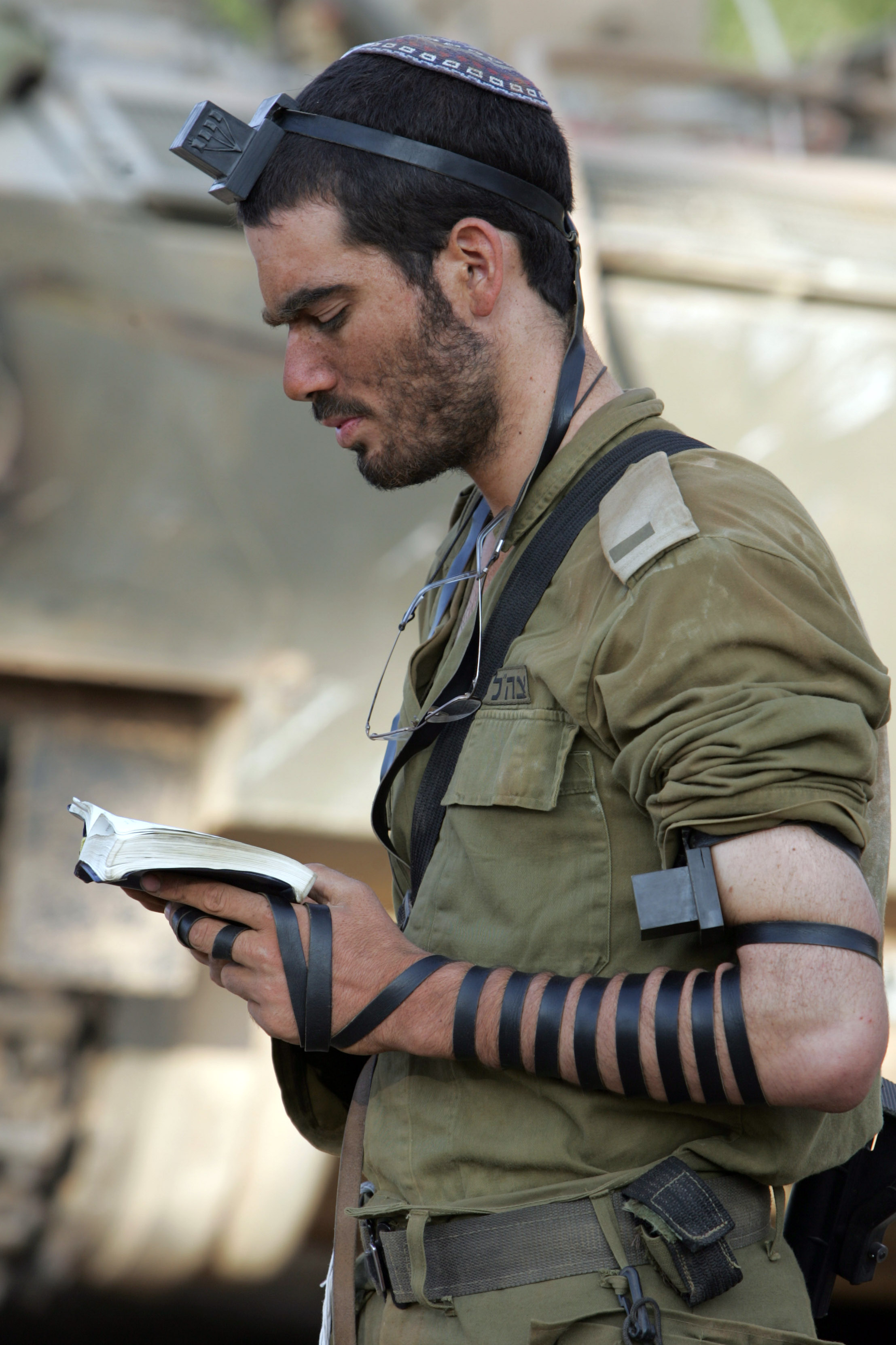
Israel Defense Forces soldier Asael Lubotzky prays with tefillin.

Standard Ashkenazi practice is to put on and remove the arm tefillin while standing in accordance to the Shulchan Aruch, while most Sephardim do so while sitting in accordance with the Ari. All, however, put on and remove the head tefillin while standing. Halacha forbids speaking or being distracted while putting on the tefillin. An Ashkenazi says two blessings when laying tefillin, the first before he ties the arm-tefillin: ...lehani'ach tefillin ("to bind tefillin"), and the second after placing the head tefillin: ...al mitzvat tefillin ("as to the commandment of tefillin"); thereafter, he tightens the head straps and says "Baruch Shem Kovod..." ("blessed be the holy name"). The Sephardic custom is that no blessing is said for the head-tefillin, the first blessing sufficing for both. Sephardim, Chabad and followers of the Vilna Gaon only recite the blessing on the head-tefillah if they spoke about something not related to tefillin since reciting the blessing on the arm-tefillah.

The arm-tefillin is laid on the inner side of the bare left arm, right arm if one is left handed, two finger breadths above the elbow, so that when the arm is bent the tefillin faces towards the heart. The arm-tefillin is tightened with the thumb, the blessing is said, and the strap is immediately wrapped around the upper arm in the opposite direction it came from in order to keep the knot tight without having to hold it. Some wrap it around the upper arm for less than a full revolution (the bare minimum to keep the knot tight) and then wrap it around the forearm seven times, while others wrap it around the upper arm an additional time before wrapping it around the forearm. Many Ashkenazim and Italian Jews wear the knot to be tightened (not to be confused with the knot on the base which is permanently tied and always worn on the inside, facing the heart) on the inside and wrap inward, while most Nusach Sephard Ashkenazim and Sephardim wear it on the outside and wrap outward.

Then the head-tefillin is placed on the middle of the head just above the forehead, so that no part rests below the hairline. A bald or partially bald person's original hairline is used. The knot of the head-tefillin sits at the back of the head, upon the part of the occipital bone that protrudes just above the nape. The two straps of the head-tefillin are brought in front of the shoulders, with their blackened side facing outwards. Now the remainder of the arm-tefillin straps are wound three times around the middle finger and around the hand to form the shape of the Hebrew letter of either a shin (ש) according to Ashkenazim, or a dalet (ד) according to Sephardim. There are various customs regarding winding the strap on the arm and hand. In fact, the arm strap is looped for counter-clockwise wrapping with Ashkenazi tefillin while it is knotted for clockwise wrapping with Sephardic and Hasidic tefillin. On removing the tefillin, the steps are reversed.

Earlier, Yemenite Jews' custom was to put on arm-Tefillah and wind forearm with strap, making knot on wrist not winding a finger, and then put on head-Tefillah all made in sitting position. Later, Yemenite Jews followed by Shulchan Aruch and put on arm-Tefillah, making seven windings on forearm and three on a finger, and then put on head-Tefillah. Because according to the Shulchan Aruch head-Tefillah and arm-Tefillah are two different commandments, if both Tefillin aren't available, then one can wear the available one alone.

German Jews also did not tie a finger earlier. But later they put on arm-Tefillah with a knot on biceps while standing, then put on head-Tefillah, and after that they wind seven wraps around forearm (counting by the seven Hebrew words of Psalms 145:16), and three wraps around a finger.

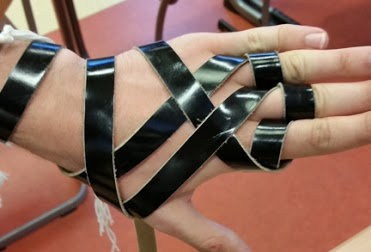
Tefillin wrapping custom of the Rodrigues-Pereira family

Some Western Sephardic families such as the Rodrigues-Pereira family have developed a personalized family wrapping method.

== Biblical commandments ==
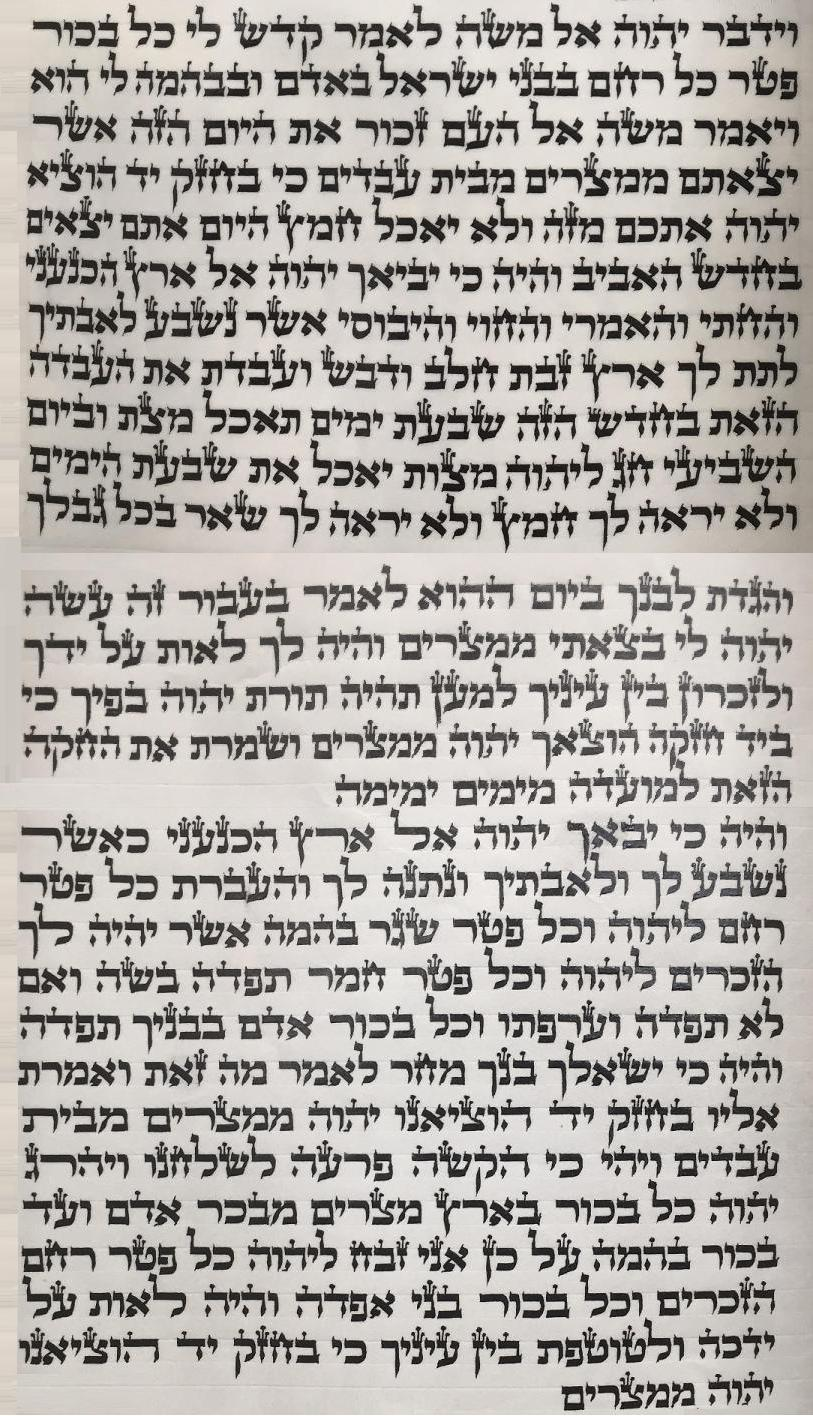
Two paragraphs that conclude Parashat Bo are included in the scroll in addition to the first two paragraphs of Shema Yisrael.

Location	Passage
Exodus 13:1–10: Kadesh Li— the duty of the Jewish people to remember the redemption from Egyptian bondage.	And the LORD spoke to Moses, saying: 'Sanctify to Me all the first-born, whatever opens the womb among the children of Israel, both of man and of animal, it is Mine.' And Moses said to the people: 'Remember this day, in which you came out from Egypt, out of the house of bondage; for by strength of hand the LORD brought you out from this place; no leavened bread shall be eaten. This day you go forth in the Spring month. And it shall be when the LORD shall bring you into the land of the Canaanite, and the Hittite, and the Amorite, and the Hivite, and the Jebusite, which He swore unto your fathers to give you, a land flowing with milk and honey, that you shall keep this service in this month. Seven days you shall eat unleavened bread, and the seventh day shall be a feast to the LORD. Unleavened bread shall be eaten throughout the seven days; and no leavened bread shall be seen with you, neither shall there be leaven seen with you, in all your borders. And so shall you tell your son on that day, saying: It is because of that which the LORD did for me when I came forth out of Egypt. And it shall be for a sign for you upon your hand, and as a memorial between your eyes, that the law of the LORD may be in your mouth; for with a strong hand has the LORD brought you out of Egypt. You shalt therefore keep this ordinance in its season from year to year.
Exodus 13:11–16: Ve-haya Ki Yeviakha— the obligation of every Jew to inform his or her children on these matters.	When the LORD brings you into the land of the Canaanite, as He swore unto you and to your fathers, and shall give it to you, you shall set apart to the LORD all that opens the womb; every firstborn animal shall be the LORD'S. Every firstborn donkey you shall redeem with a sheep, and if you will not redeem it, then you shall break its neck; and all the first-born of man among your sons shall you redeem. And when your son asks you in time to come, saying: What is this? say to him: By strength of hand the LORD bring us out from Egypt, from the house of bondage; and when Pharaoh found it hard to let us go the LORD killed all the firstborn in the land of Egypt, both the first-born of man, and the first-born of animals; therefore I sacrifice to the LORD all males that open the womb, and redeem all my first-born sons. And it shall be for a sign upon your hand, and as "totafot" between your eyes; for by strength of hand the LORD brought us forth out of Egypt.
Deuteronomy 6:4–9: Shema— pronouncing the Unity of the One God.	Hear, O Israel: the LORD our God, the LORD is one. And you shall love the LORD your God with all your heart, and with all your soul, and with all your might. And these words, which I command you this day, shall be upon your heart; and teach them thoroughly to your children, and speak of them when you sit in your house, and when you walk on the road, and when you lie down, and when you get up. And tie them for a sign upon your hand, and let them be "totafot" between your eyes. And write them on the door-posts of your house and on your gates.
Deuteronomy 11:13–21: Ve-haya Im Shamoa— God's assurance of reward for observance of the Torah's precepts and warning of retribution for disobedience.	If you listen to My commandments which I command you today, to love the LORD your God, and to serve Him with all your heart and with all your soul, then I will give the rain of your land in its season, the early and the late rain, and you will gather in your grain, your wine, and your oil. And I will give grass in your fields for your cattle, and you will eat and be satisfied. Take care for yourselves, lest your heart be seduced, and you turn aside, and serve other gods, and worship them; and the anger of the LORD be lit against you, and He shut up the heaven, so that there shall be no rain, and the ground not yield her fruit; and you be quickly lost from off the good land which the LORD gives you. Put these words of Mine on your heart and on your soul; tie them as a sign on your hand, and they shall be "totafot" between your eyes. Teach them to your children, to speak of them when you sit in your house, and when you walk on the road, and when you lie down, and when you rise up. And write them on the door-posts of your house, and upon your gates; so that your days, and those of your children, may be multiplied upon the land which the LORD swore unto your fathers to give them, as the days of the heavens above the earth.

== See also ==
- Armleder persecutions
- Ktav Stam
- Tefillin Campaign
- Tokin (headwear)
