= Kroc =

Kroc is a surname. Notable people with the name include:

- Janae Kroc (born 1972), bodybuilder and powerlifter
- Joan Kroc (1929–2003), American philanthropist
- Ray Kroc (1902–1984), American founder of McDonald's

== See also ==
- People with the surname Krock
- People with the surname Krok
