= Tokin (headwear) =

Small black box-shaped Japanese hat

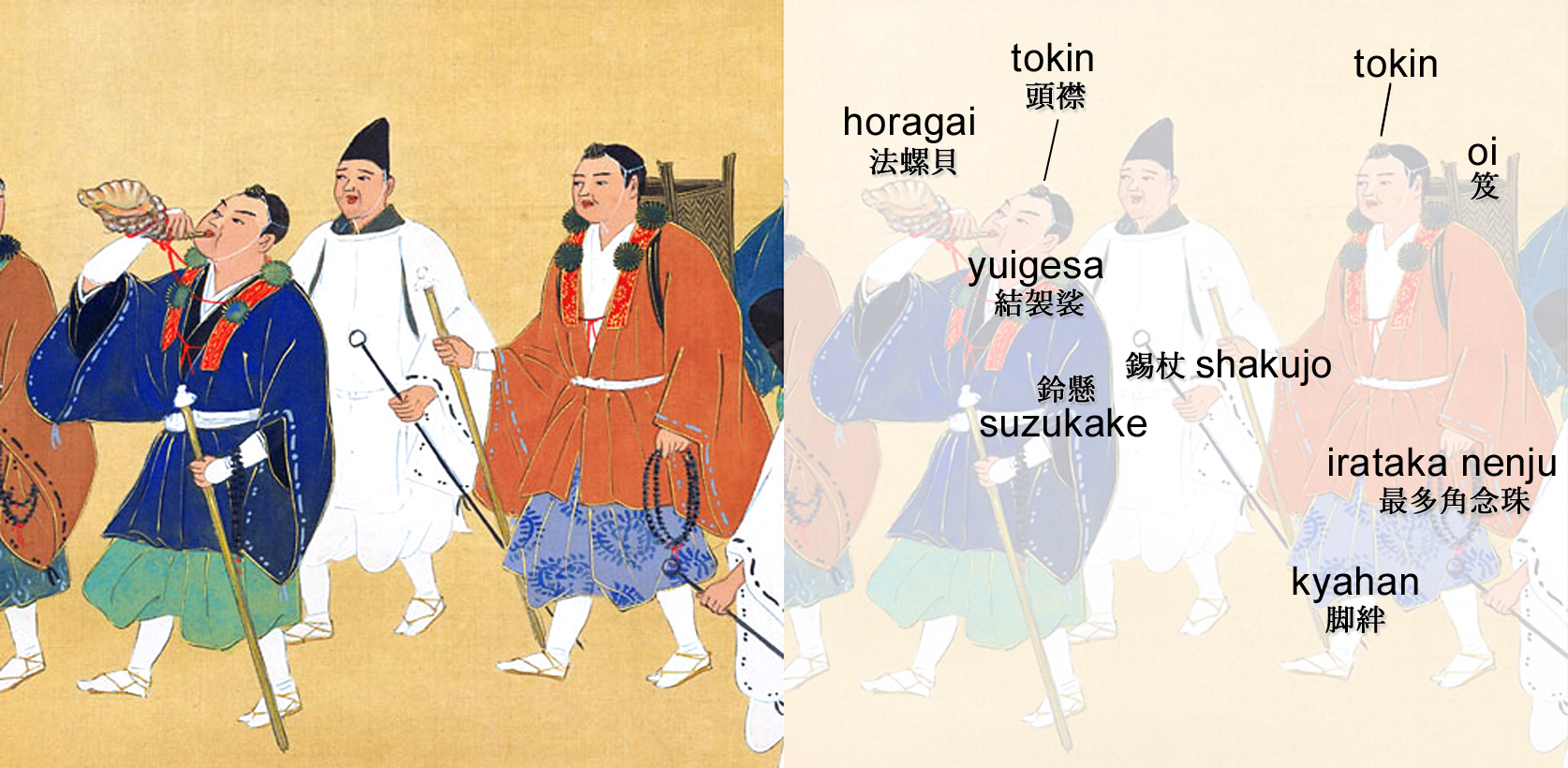
The appearance of yamabushi. Various items which yamabushi usually wear and bear are shown in this image, such as tokin, suzukake, yuigesa, horagai, kyahan, oi, katabako, irataka nenju and shakujō.

The tokin (頭襟、兜巾、頭巾、ときん) is a small, black, box-shaped hat traditional to Japan, which yamabushi (mountain ascetic hermits) of shugendō wear on their foreheads. The tokin has been worn since the Kamakura period (1185–1333) or the Muromachi period (1336–1573).

== Yamabushi and tengu ==
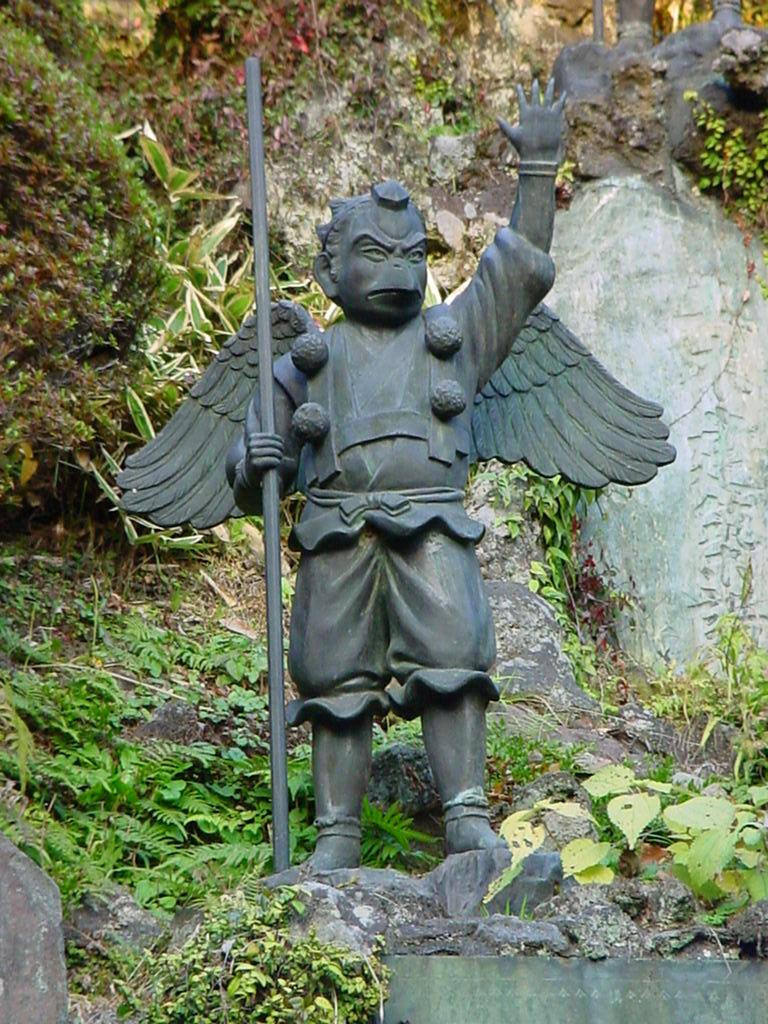
Statue of a karasu-tengu as a yamabushi wearing a tokin

The tokin is one of the standard items which yamabushi wear as a uniform. When practising shugendō in the deep mountains, they wear suzukake, a set consisting of upper robe and trousers, Yuigesa (結袈裟), a harness or sash adorned with pom-poms on the body, irataka nenju (Buddhist Prayer beads) on the side, a tokin on the head, Kyahan (脚絆), on the calves, sandals made from straw, hold Shakujō (錫杖), a metal rod, in their hands, wear Oi (笈), a kind of backpack, and katabako, a box borne on the shoulders containing prayers, paperwork and writing supplies, and blow a Horagai (法螺貝) (conch-shell horn). These sacred items may guard them from the malicious spirits, thus they are safe in the deep forests. This style was established in the Kamakura or Muromachi period, and the contemporary yamabushi keep this tradition today.

Tengu, dangerous yet protective spirits of the mountains and forests, are depicted in the style of yamabushi, and are also shown wearing the tokin.

== Forms and symbolism ==
The tokin is usually a small, black box-shaped hat, which is made of lacquered and hardened cloth or wood. The top of the tokin looks like a small round tower. It has the pentagonal box shape, and twelve folds surround this pentagon.

Its pentagonal form represents gochi no hōkan, the jeweled crown of the five wisdoms, which is the crown of the buddha Vairocana. Twelve folds represent jūni-innen (Twelve Nidānas); the color black represents the kleshas of human beings.

There are also different forms of tokin. Large-type tokin cover the head entirely.

== Tokin and zukin ==
In common and modern Japanese, the word tokin is rendered with the same kanji as the word 頭巾 (zukin), another type of Japanese headgear that mainly wraps or folds cloth to cover the head and face; however, despite being written identically, tokin and zukin are quite different.
