= Spats (footwear) =

Short gaiters worn over the instep

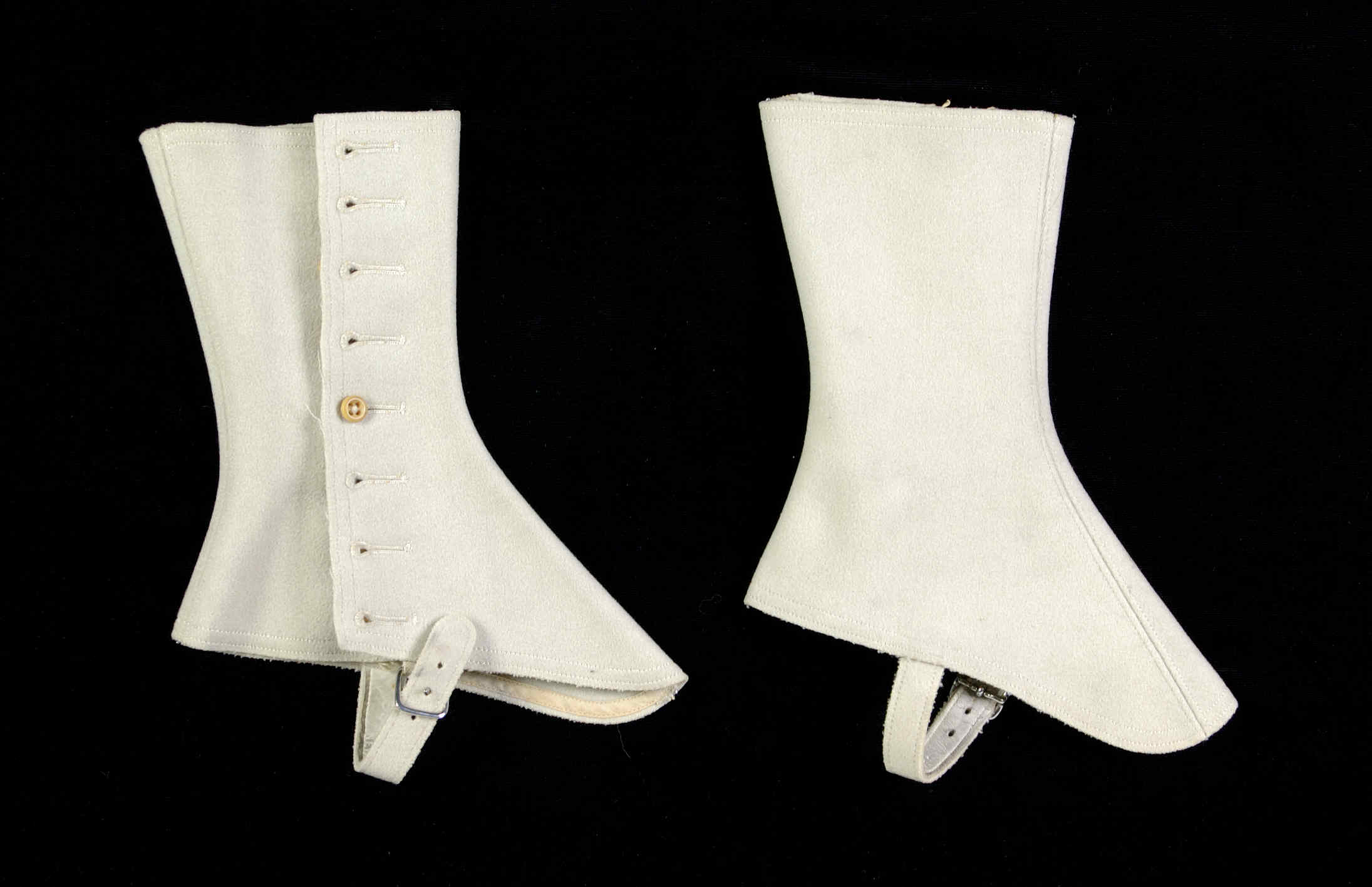
- Woolen spats
- Type: many, (cloth, wool…)
- Place of origin: Europe (late 17th century as military footwear)
- Manufacturer: many

Spats (a shortening of spatterdashes), spatter guards or half gaiters, a type of footwear accessory for outdoor wear, cover the instep and the ankle. Spats are distinct from gaiters, which are garments worn over the lower trouser-leg as well as over the shoe.

== Civilian dress ==
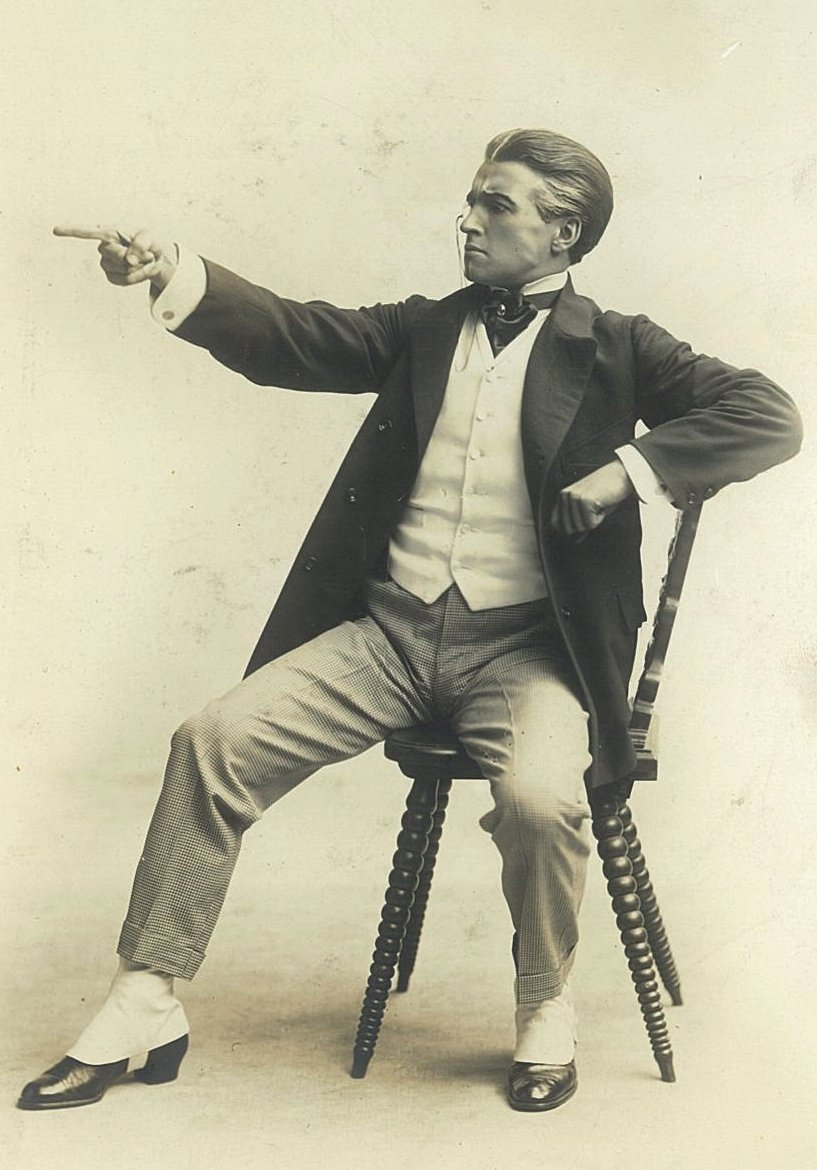
Claude Rains wearing spats in 1912

Spats were worn by men and, less commonly, by women in the late 19th and early 20th centuries. They fell out of frequent use during the 1920s. Made of white cloth, grey or brown felt material, spats buttoned around the ankle. Their intended practical purpose was to protect shoes and socks from mud or rain, but they also served as a feature of stylish dress in accordance with the fashions of the period. Emily Post's 1931 Etiquette: The Blue Book of Social Usage stated, "Spats are optional. If chosen, they must match the gloves exactly."

Increased informality may have been the primary reason for the decline in the wearing of spats. In 1913, friends scrambled to help Griffith Taylor find spats and a top hat to receive the Polar Medal from King George V. In 1923, King George V opened the Chelsea Flower Show, an important event in the London Season, wearing a frock coat, gray top hat and spats. By 1926, the King shocked the public by wearing a black morning coat instead of a frock coat (a small but significant change). This arguably helped speed the frock coat's demise (although it was still being worn on the eve of the Second World War). Spats were another clothing accessory left off by the King in 1926. It is said that the moment this was observed and commented on by the spectators it produced an immediate reaction; the ground beneath the bushes was littered with discarded spats.

Another reason for the decline in women's use of spats was the popularity of open-topped shoes with interesting visual details like straps and cutouts in the 1920s. Rising hemlines made it possible for women to show off more intricate footwear, which was meant to be visible, not covered by spats.

From New York in 1936, the Associated Press observed that "in recent years well-dressed men have been discarding spats because they have become the property of the rank and file." A revival of high-top shoes with cloth uppers was forecast to replace them.

== Military uniform ==
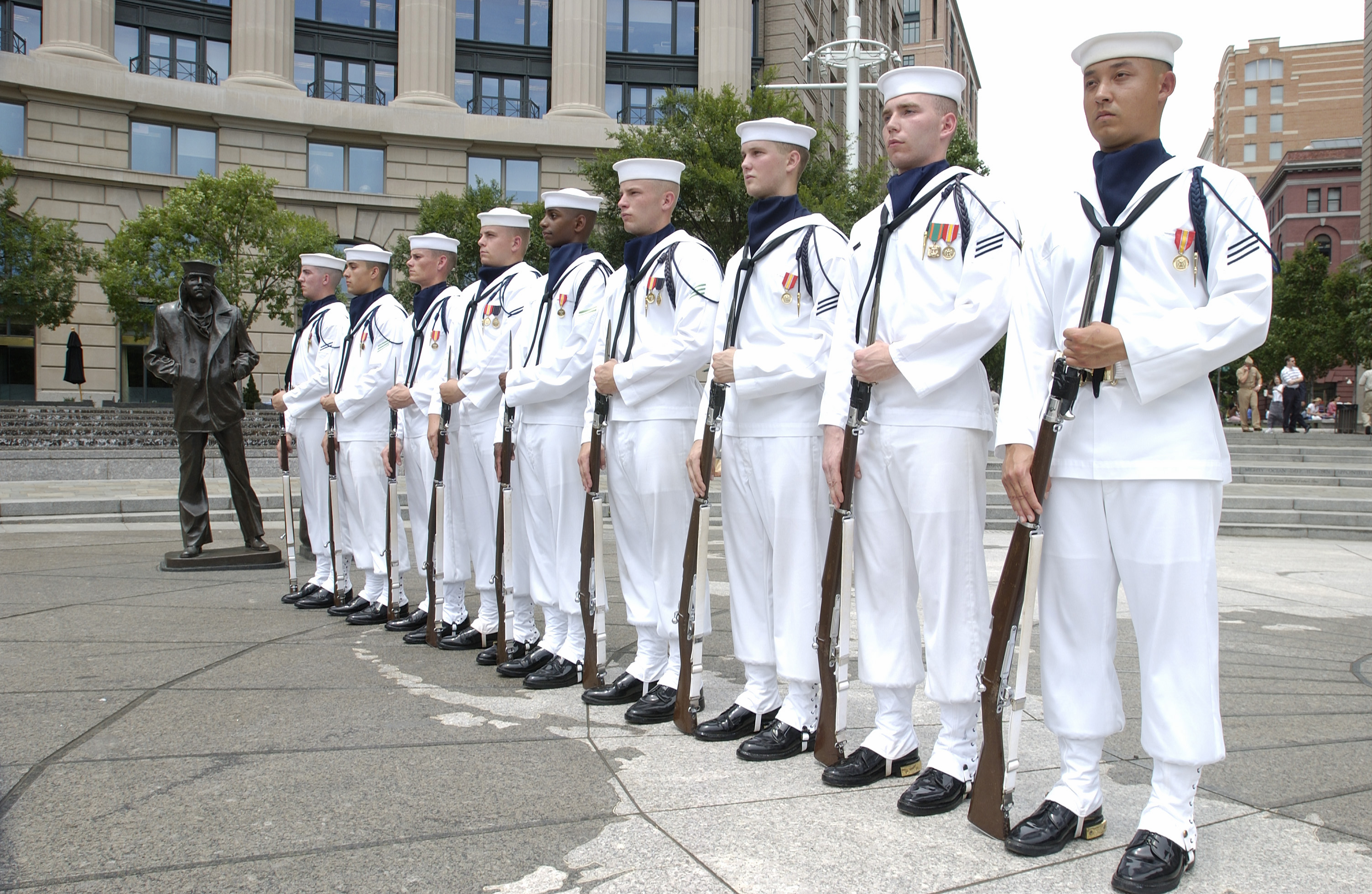
U.S. Navy Ceremonial Guard wear white canvas leggings as part of their Enlisted Full Dress Whites.

Since the mid-19th century, soldiers of various nations, especially infantry, often wore leggings or spats to protect their lower leg, to keep dirt, sand, and mud from entering their shoes, and to provide a measure of ankle support. French infantry wore white spats for parade and off-duty wear until 1903. Italian soldiers wore a light tan version until 1910, and the Japanese Army wore long white spats or gaiters during the Russo-Japanese War of 1905.

Spats continue as a distinctive feature of the Scottish dress of Highland pipe bands, whether civilian or military. The modern Royal Regiment of Scotland, into which all Scottish line infantry regiments were amalgamated in 2006, retain white spats as part of their uniform. Prior to that date most Scottish infantry units in the British Army and Canadian Army wore spats. For Highland regiments in kilts, spats reached halfway up the calf. For Lowland regiments in trews, spats were visible only over the brogue shoes.

As part of their parade uniforms, most regiments of the modern Indian and Pakistani armies wear long white spats into which soldiers tuck the bottoms of their trousers. Other full-dress uniforms that still include spats are those of the Finnish Army, Swedish Army, Portuguese Republican National Guard, the Carabiniers of Monaco, the Egyptian Military Police, and the Italian Military Academy of Modena. In the Finnish Navy, spats are part of the winter uniform; and the United States Navy Honor Guard and Rifle Guard wear them while performing ceremonies. Spats are also still used as a traditional accessory in many marching band and drum and bugle corps uniforms in the United States.

== Personal protective equipment ==
Spats remain in use today as personal protective equipment in certain industries. In foundries, pourers wear leather spats over their boots to protect against splashes of molten metal. Even a small splash that lodges in a shoe or between the shoe and ankle could cause a severe burn. Many welders also wear fire-resistant spats for protection from sparks. Casual chainsaw operators often wear protective spats over steel-toe boots, but professionals are now encouraged to wear true chainsaw boots to prevent injury from accidental chainsaw contact with the foot or ankle.
