= Crock =

Crock may refer to:

- Crock (comic strip), a daily comic strip that was published from 1975 to 2012
- Crock (dishware), a stoneware pot

== See also ==
- Croc (disambiguation)
- Krock (disambiguation)
- Croque
