= Gator (facility) =

Germanium counting facility

Gator is a low-background germanium counting facility for high-sensitivity gamma-ray spectrometry at the Laboratori Nazionali del Gran Sasso in Italy. The Gator facility is primarily employed to quantify radioactivity levels for rare-event search experiments in astroparticle physics, such as for the XENON dark matter research project. In 2023, it was used to perform high-precision experimental searches for possible small violations of the Pauli exclusion principle.

At its core, Gator deploys a high-purity germanium detector with a 2.2 kg (4.9 lb) sensitive mass. This detector is shielded from ambient radioactivity by layers of copper, lead, and polyethylene. To mitigate radon present in air, the surrounding stainless steel enclosure is continuously flushed with nitrogen gas at positive pressure. Cosmic radiation is suppressed by the underground location of the facility, with a rock overburden providing shielding equivalent to about 3,600 m (11,800 ft) of water. These measures result in a low measured background count rate in the absence of material samples of 82.0±0.7 counts/(kg·day) in the energy region of 100 keV to 2700 keV.
