= Mount Ōfuna =

Mountain in Hyōgo Prefecture, Japan

- 大船山
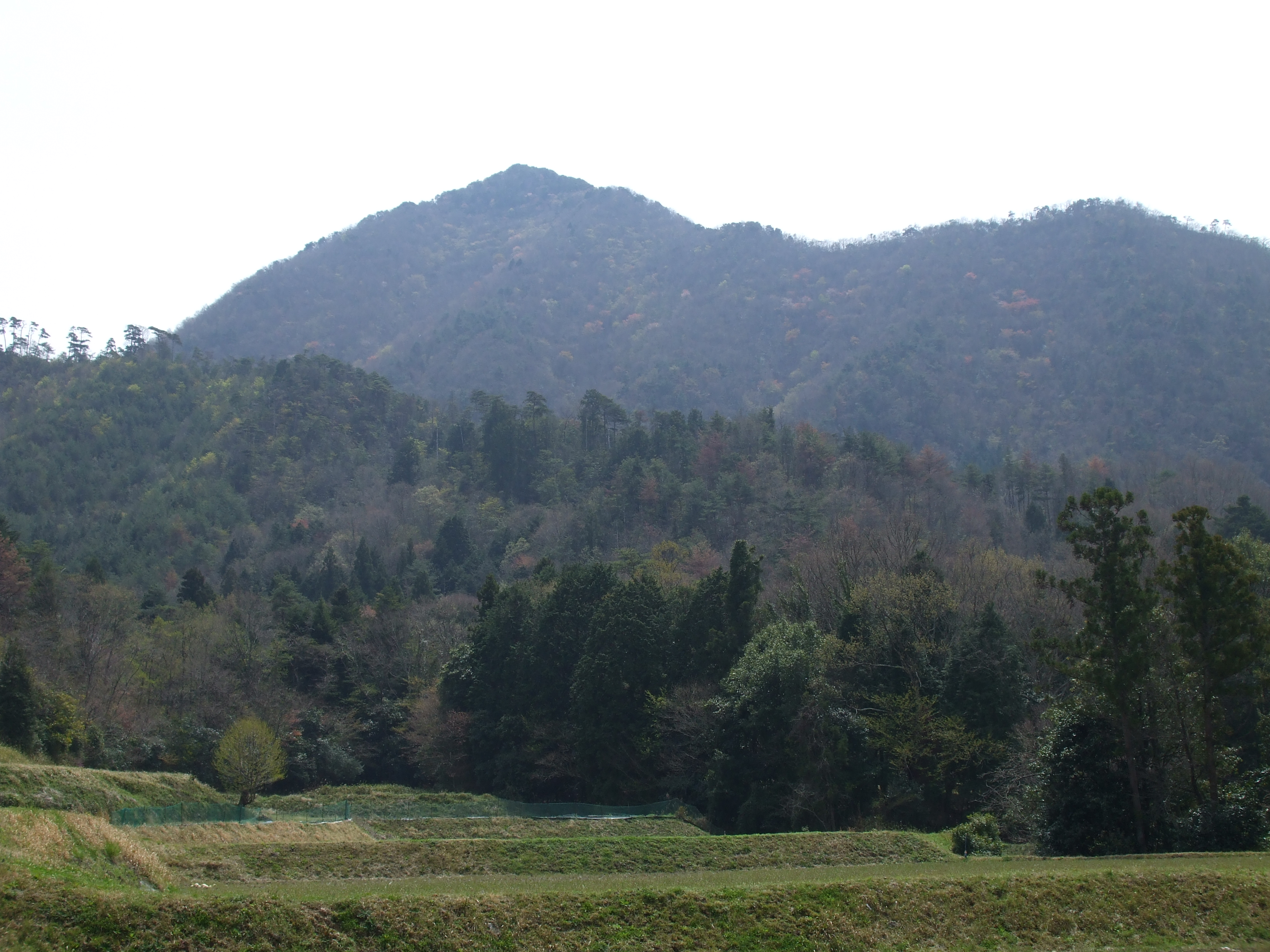

Highest point
- Elevation: 653.1 m (2,143 ft)
- Coordinates: 34°57′N 135°17′E

Naming
- Pronunciation: Japanese: [oːɸunajama]

Geography
- Location: Sanda, Hyōgo, Japan
- Parent range: Tamba Highland

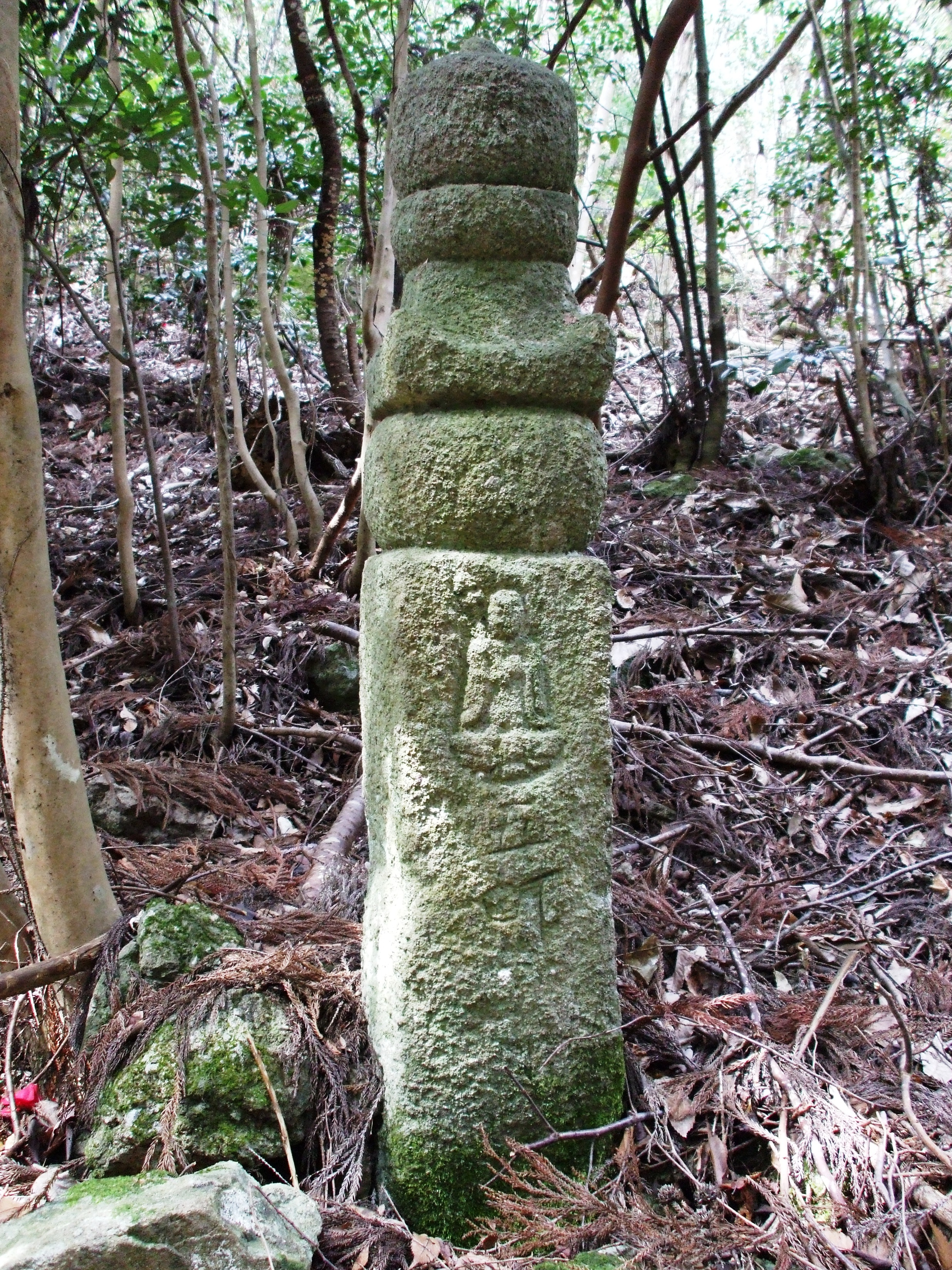
A Jizō guidepost

Mount Ōfuna (大船山, Ōfunayama) is a 653.1 metre high Japanese mountain in Sanda, Hyōgo, Japan.

Mount Ōfuna is an independent peak in Tamba Highland. This mountain is one of the 50 famous mountains in Hyōgo Prefecture, and visitors can enjoy very wide panorama view around the mountain.

== History ==
This mountain was one of the important mountains of the enduring ascetic practices for Shugenja monks. Still there is a small shrine on the top. Near the top of the mountain there was a Buddhist temple, called ‘Ōfunadera’, which was said to be constructed in the 6th century. However the temple moved to the foot of the mountain in 1499.

Today, visitors can find guideposts with a likeness of Jizō carved in the 14th century on the mountain.

== Access ==
- Tokura Bus Stop of Shinki Bus
- Hazugawa Bus Stop of Shinki Bus
