= Gadmeh Gater =

Gadmeh Gater گادمه گتر
- Village
- Location within Iran
- Coordinates: 36°04′49″N 47°18′36″E
- Country: Iran
- Province: Kurdistan
- County: Divandarreh
- Bakhsh: Central
- Rural District: Qaratureh

Population (2006)
  - Total: 416
- Time zone: UTC+3:30 (IRST)
  - Summer (DST): UTC+4:30 (IRDT)

Gadmeh Gater (Persian: گادمه گتر, also Romanized as Gādmeh Gater) is a village in Qaratureh Rural District, in the Central District of Divandarreh County, Kurdistan Province, Iran. At the 2006 census, its population was 416, in 80 families. The village is populated by Kurds.
