= Kyahan =

Cloth leggings and retainers worn by samurai in feudal Japan

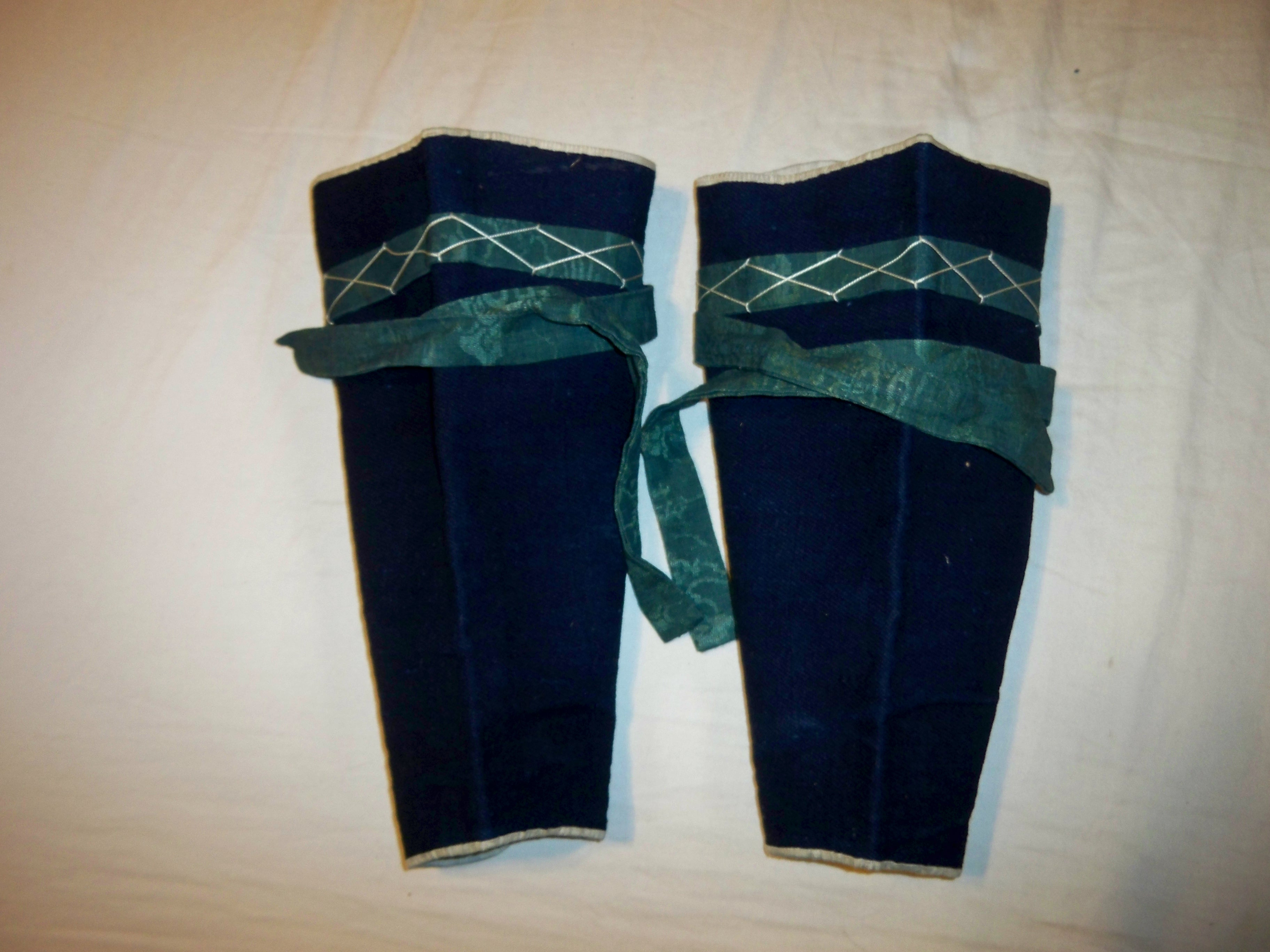
Antique Japanese kyahan

Kyahan (脚絆（きゃはん）) are cloth leggings which were worn by the samurai class and their retainers in feudal Japan. In Japanese, the word is also used for Western soldiers' gaiters.

== Description ==
Kyahan were worn as padding underneath the samurai greaves (suneate). Some types of kyahan could be covered with mail armour (kusari kyahan or kyahan suneate); these were worn by foot soldiers (ashigaru) or by samurai as protection. Kyahan were worn by ordinary travelers as protection from cold, insects and underbrush.

Kyahan were often made of linen, but other materials such as cotton were also used. Kyahan components depended on the season. When tying kyahan, the inner cords are shorter than the outer ones; the cords are typically tied on the inner side of the legs instead of on the front or outer area, preventing discomfort when the stiff greaves are placed over the kyahan.

== See also ==
- Suneate
- List of items traditionally worn in Japan

== Sources ==
- Turnbull, Stephen (1998). The Samurai Sourcebook. London: Arms & Armour Press. ISBN 1-85409-371-1 [reprinted by Cassell & Co., London, 2000. ISBN 1-85409-523-4 ]
