= Gaiters =

Garment worn over the shoe and lower pants leg

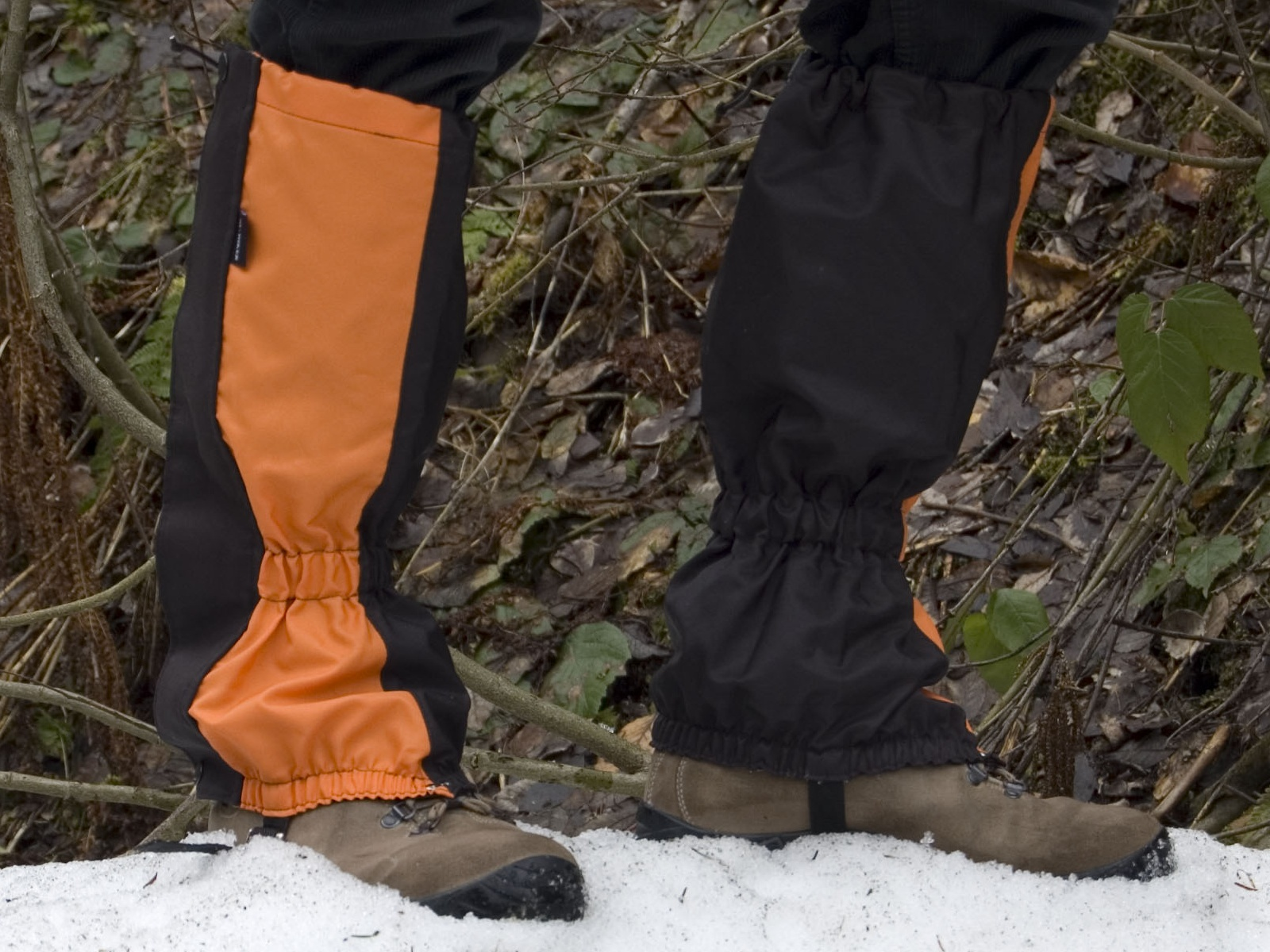
Hiking gaiters

Gaiters are garments worn over the shoe and bottom of the pant or trouser leg and used primarily as personal protective equipment, in particular against snakebite. They are also commonly used to keep the bottom of the pant-leg dry when hiking in snow. Similar garments used primarily for display are spats.

Originally, gaiters were made of leather or canvas. Today, those for walking are commonly made of plasticized synthetic cloth such as nylon or polyester. Gaiters for use on horseback continue to be made of leather. They are made to cover the gap between the pants and boots, rising to just below the knee, and usually have drawcords for tightening.

Common materials for leg gaiters on the market are canvas, nylon, Cordura, Kevlar, and leather.

== Military origins and terminology ==
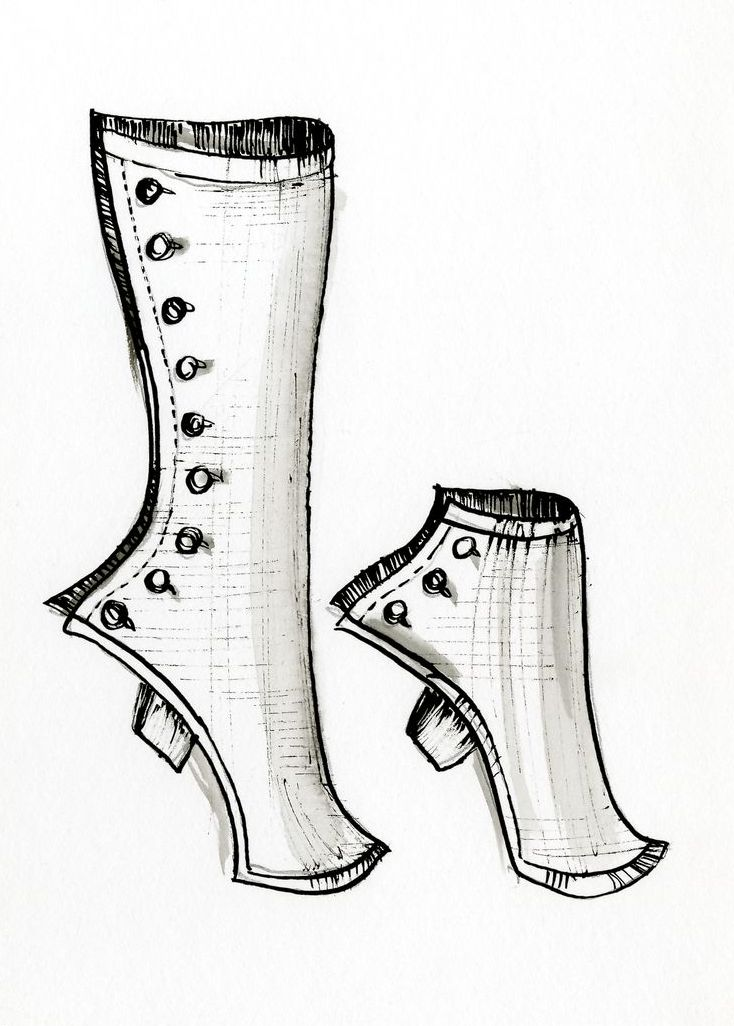
Two different lengths of gaiters: mid-calf and ankle-length. The sketch shows buttons for the back and a strap that goes underneath the foot to hold the gaiter in place.

Beginning in 1700, most infantry in European armies adopted long linen gaiters, or spatterdashes, as a protective leg covering to be worn over the woollen stockings that were a common feature in both military and civilian dress. By the 1770s military gaiters were often shortened to mid-calf length ("half-gaiters") for convenience in the field.

In army parlance, a gaiter covers leg and bootlacing; a legging covers only the leg. In Royal Air Force parlance, gaiter includes leggings. The United States Army during World War I and World War II had leggings, which were gaiters. Above the knee spatterdashes were cotton or canvas, as were many gaiters of varying lengths thereafter. Leather gaiters were rare in military usage, though sometimes a calf-length cotton gaiter had leather kneecaps added. Leggings, however, were very often made of leather, but also canvas.

== On foot ==
Gaiters are a type of protective clothing for a person's ankles and legs below the knee. Gaiters are worn when walking, hiking, running (especially orienteering and rogaining) outdoors amongst dense underbrush or in snow, with or without snowshoes. Heavy gaiters are often worn when using crampons, to protect the leg and ankle from the spikes of the opposite foot. Gaiters strap over the hiking boot and around the person's leg to provide protection from branches and thorns and to prevent mud, snow, etc. from entering the top of the boot. Gaiters may also be worn as protection against snake bites.

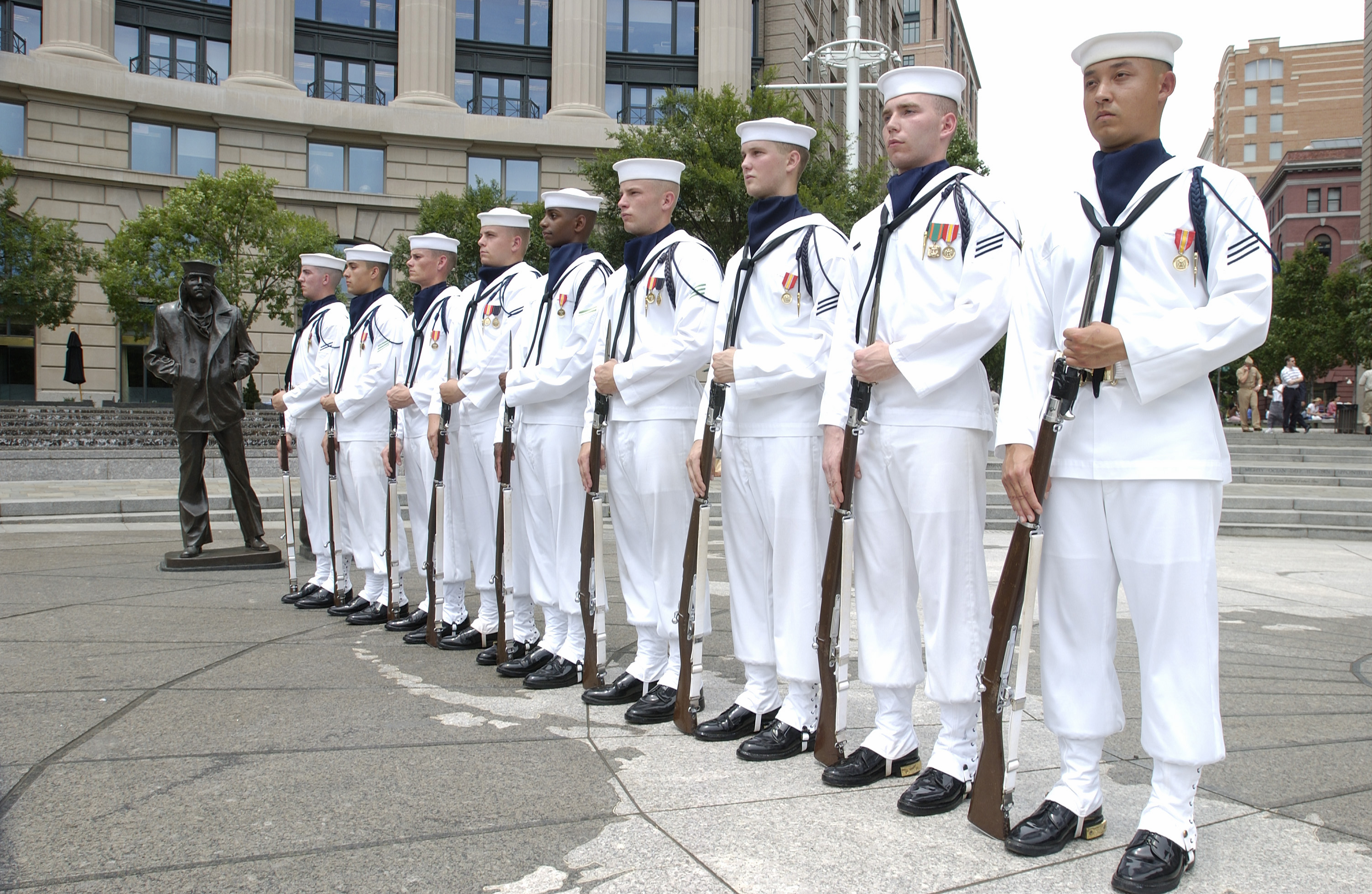
U.S. Navy Ceremonial Guard wearing white canvas leggings, as the part of the Enlisted Full Dress Whites or Blue

Gaiters fill the same function as puttees, a part of numerous military uniforms. Gaiters known as jambieres (derived from the French word jambe for legs, hence leggings) were part of the uniform of Zouave infantry regiments.

== On horseback ==
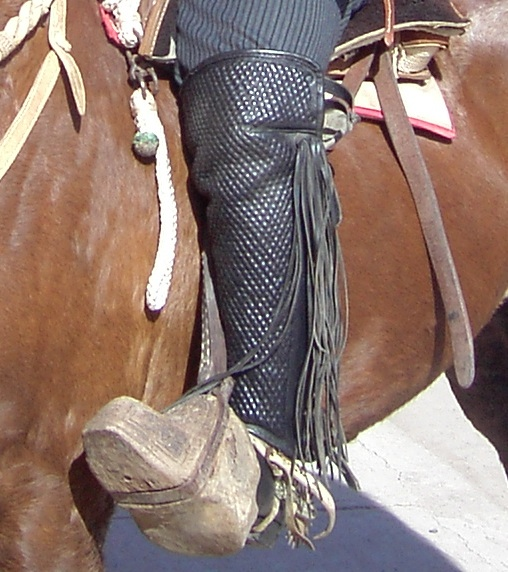
Over-the-knee gaiters worn by a Chilean rodeo rider

During the 19th century gaiters for riding typically were known as riding gaiters, distinguishing them from the other gaiters that were in general use. Today, half chaps are a type of gaiter worn by equestrians. Most forms fit over the calf. These are intended to protect the rider's leg from wear by the stirrup leathers and other saddle parts. Modern styles usually have a zipper or hook and loop fasteners on the outside of the leg.

== In the Anglican church ==
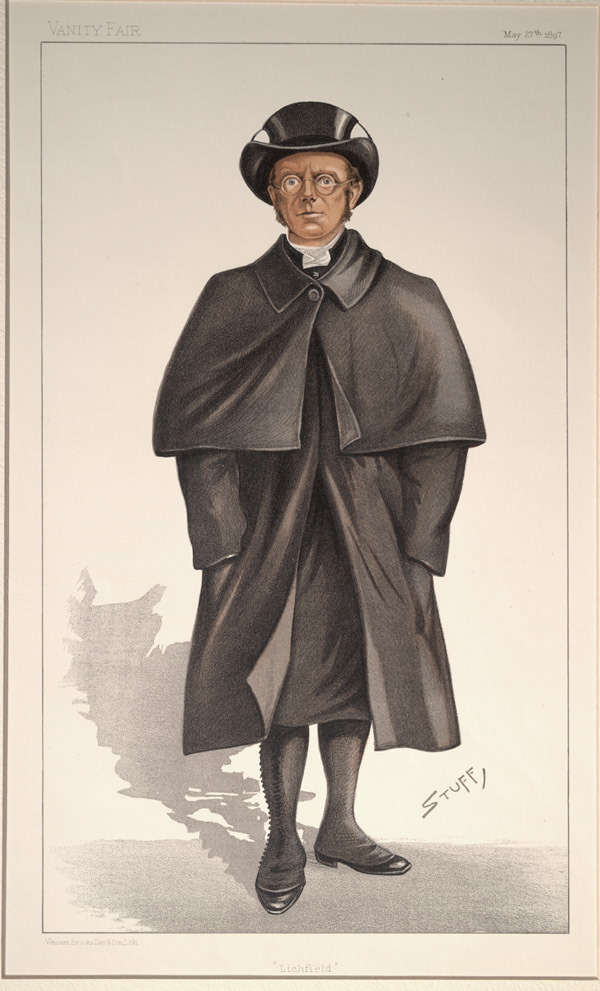
The Bishop of Lichfield, in Vanity Fair, 1897

Gaiters formed a part of the everyday clerical clothing of bishops and archdeacons of the Church of England until the middle part of the twentieth century. They were also worn by some cathedral deans. They were made of black cotton, wool, or silk, and buttoned up the sides, reaching to just below the knee where they would join with black breeches. Gaiters would be worn with a clerical apron, a type of short cassock reaching to just above the knee. The purpose of this vesture was originally practical, since archdeacons and bishops were presumed to be mobile, riding horses to various parts of a diocese or archdeaconry. In latter years, the clothing took on a more symbolic dimension.

== See also ==
- Chaps
- Greave
- Kyahan
- Leg warmer
- Leggings
- Neck gaiter
- Puttee
- Shin guard
- Spats (footwear)
