= KROC =

KROC may refer to:

- The ICAO code for Greater Rochester International Airport in Rochester, New York
- KROC (AM), a radio station (1340 AM) licensed to Rochester, Minnesota, United States
- KROC-FM, a radio station (106.9 FM) licensed to Rochester, Minnesota, United States
- KTTC, a television station (channel 10) licensed to Rochester, Minnesota, United States, which formerly used the call sign KROC-TV

== See also ==
- KRoC, the Kent Retargetable Occam Compiler
- KROQ-FM, radio station in Greater Los Angeles, California, USA
