= Ashigaru =

Infantry employed by the samurai class of feudal Japan

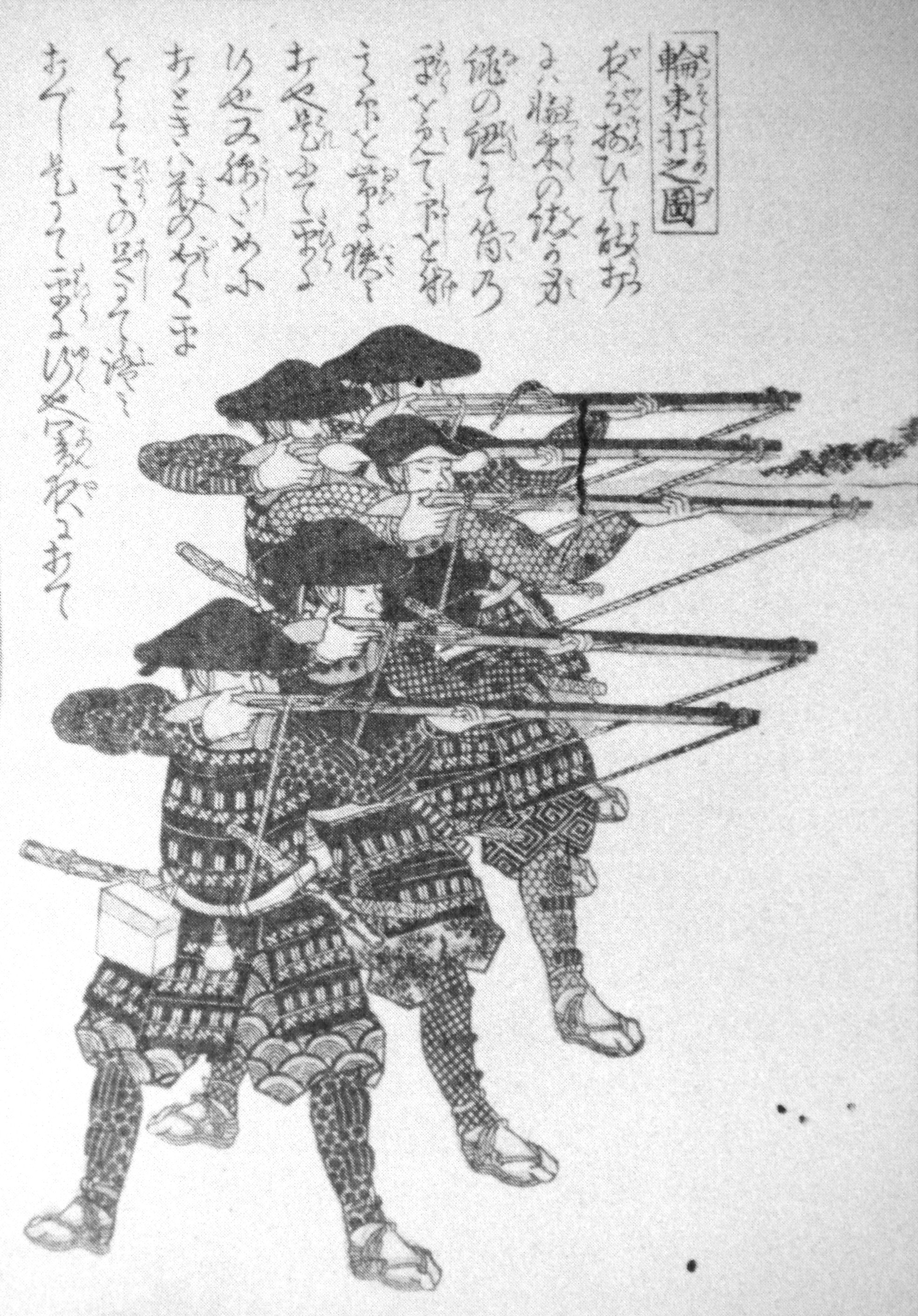
Ashigaru wearing armor and jingasa firing tanegashima (Japanese matchlocks)

Ashigaru (足軽; "light of foot") were peasant infantry employed by the warlords of Japan to supplement the samurai in their armies. The first known reference to ashigaru was in the 14th century, but it was during the Ashikaga shogunate (Muromachi period) that the use of ashigaru became prevalent by various warring factions.

== Origins ==
Attempts were made in Japan by Emperor Tenmu (673–686) to have a conscripted national army, but this did not come about, and by the 10th century Japan instead relied on individual landowners to provide men for conflicts and wars. These horse-owning landowners were the beginnings of the samurai class and the men who worked the land for the landowners became the common foot soldiers during times of war. These foot soldiers could have long ties and loyalty to the landowners which went back many generations.

Every farmer was basically also a warrior until Hideyoshi confiscated weapons through a nation-wide "sword-hunt" in 1588. Every ashigaru had his first lessons on the mentality of war from the biwa hōshi. On the other hand, the Heike recitations also propagated civic virtues: loyalty, steadfastness in adversity, and pride of family honor.

— Carl Steenstrup

Land-owning samurai, together with farmer foot soldiers, fought in many wars and conflicts including the Mongol invasions of Japan in 1274 and 1281. Constant warfare between the 14th and 16th centuries made the hiring of foot soldiers with no particular loyalty necessary at times. Paid only in loot, these mercenaries were not well-trained and thus could not always be depended upon in battle. These wandering foot soldiers eventually became the ashigaru.

== Weapons and armor ==
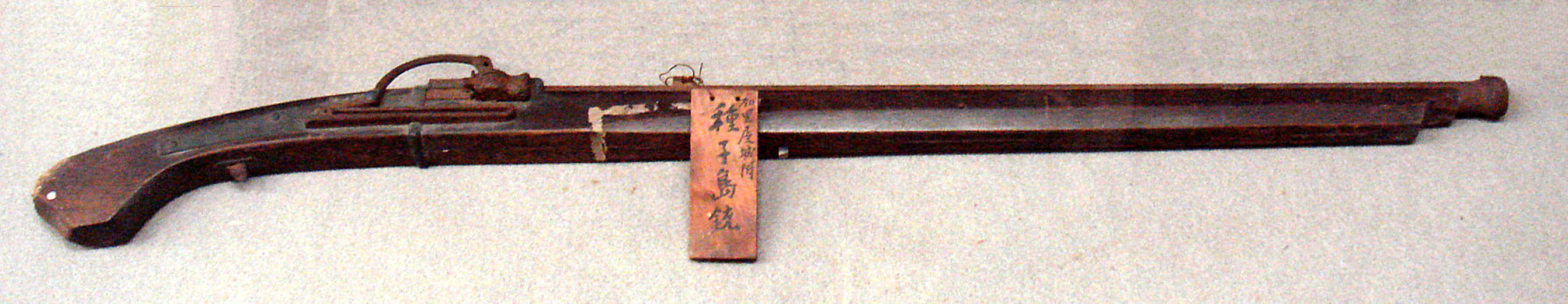
A plain undecorated tanegashima; this type was used by the ashigaru.

Ashigaru were commonly armed with katana, yari, and yumi. Ashigaru armour varied depending on the period, from no armor to heavily armored and could consist of conical hats called jingasa made from iron, copper, wood, paper, bamboo, or leather, dō (cuirasses), kabuto (helmets), tatami zukin (armored hoods), kote (armored sleeves), suneate (greaves), and haidate (cuisses).

The warfare of the Sengoku period (15th and 16th centuries) required large quantities of armor to be produced for the ever-growing armies of ashigaru. Simple munition armour cuirasses and helmets were mass-produced including tatami armor which could be folded or were collapsible. Tatami armor was made from small rectangular or hexagonal iron plates that were usually connected to each other by mail and sewn to a cloth backing.

In the 16th century the ashigaru were also armed with matchlocks of the type known as tanegashima. Small banners called sashimono could be worn on their backs during battle for identification.

== Service in war ==
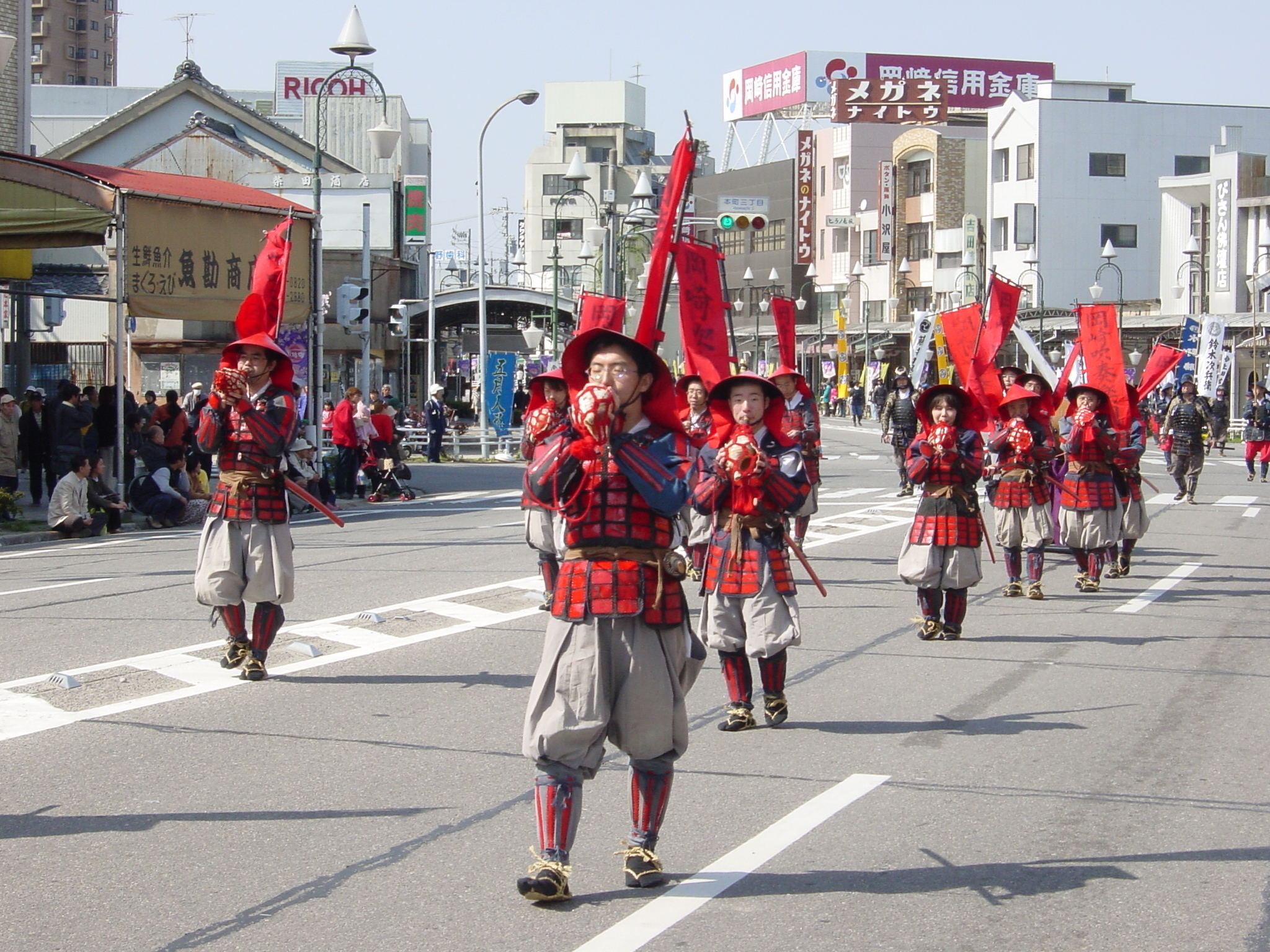
A group of re-enactors dressed as ashigaru for a parade, as part of the re-enactment of the Battle of Sekigahara

In the Ōnin War, ashigaru gained a reputation as unruly troops when they looted and burned Miyako (modern-day Kyoto). In the following Sengoku period the aspect of the battle changed from single combat to massed formations. Therefore, ashigaru became the backbone of many feudal armies and some of them rose to greater prominence.

Those who were given control of ashigaru were called ashigarugashira (足軽頭). The most famous of them was Toyotomi Hideyoshi, who also raised many of his warrior followers to samurai status.

== Introduction to firearms and new tactics ==
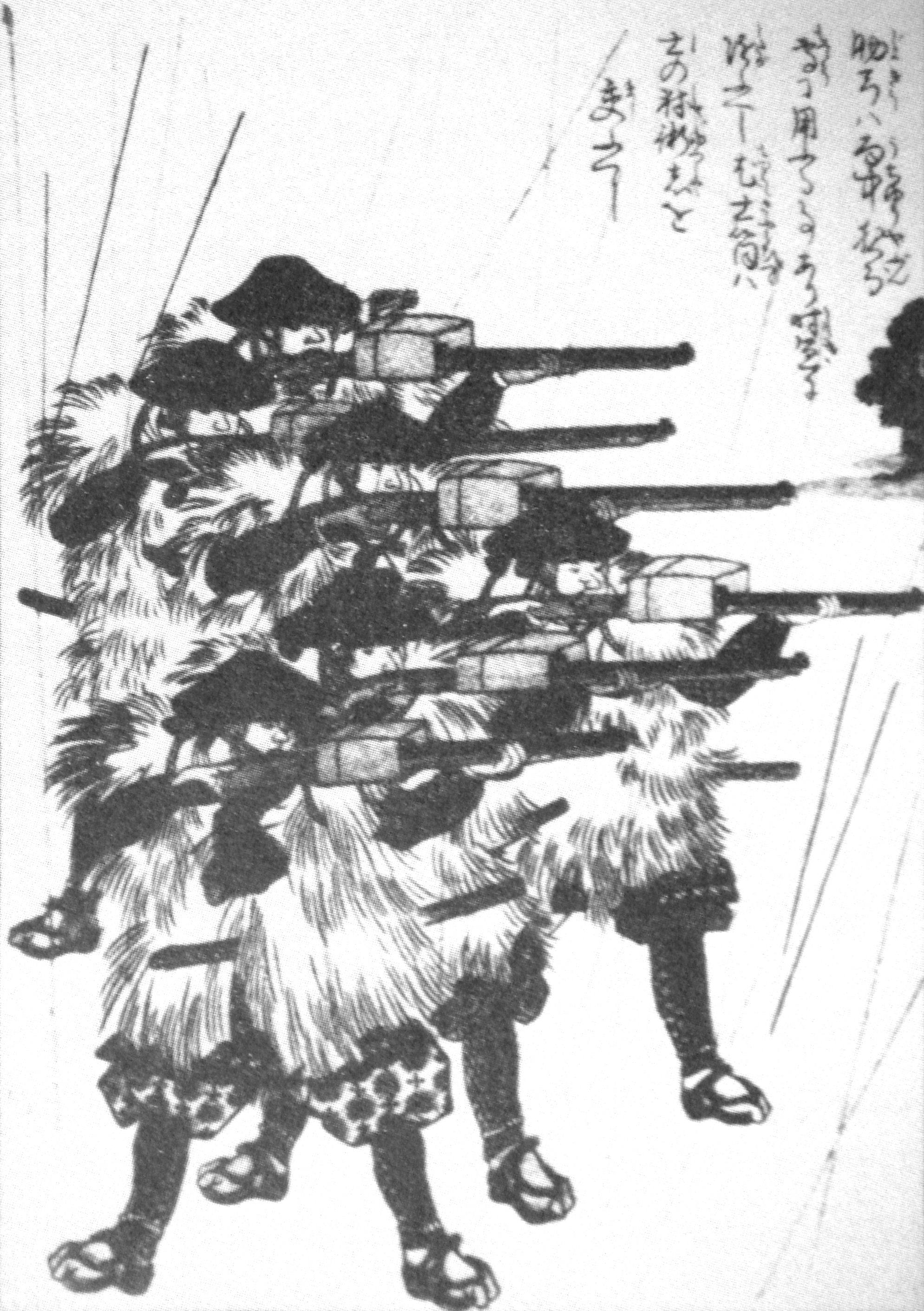
Edo period print of ashigaru wearing mino (straw raincoats) in the rain while firing tanegashima (Japanese matchlocks)

Ashigaru formed the backbone of samurai armies in the later periods. The real change for the ashigaru began in 1543 with the introduction of matchlock firearms by the Portuguese. Almost immediately local daimyōs started to equip their ashigaru with the new weapon, which required little training to use proficiently, as compared with the longbow, which took many years to learn. As battles became more complex and forces larger, ashigaru were rigorously trained so that they would hold their ranks in the face of enemy fire.

The advantage of the matchlock guns proved decisive to samurai warfare. This was demonstrated at the Battle of Nagashino in 1575, where carefully positioned ashigaru gunners of the Oda and Tokugawa clans thwarted the Takeda clan's repeated heavy cavalry charges against the Oda clan's defensive lines and broke the back of the Takeda war machine.

After the battle, the ashigaru's role in the armies was cemented as a very powerful complement to the samurai. The advantage was used in the two invasions of Korea in 1592 and 1597 against the Koreans and later the Ming-dynasty Chinese. Though the ratio of guns (matchlocks) to bows was 2:1 during the first invasion, the ratio became 4:1 in the second invasion since the guns proved highly effective.

== Discontinuation of conscription ==
Following the rise of the Tokugawa shogunate, the conscription of ashigaru fell into disuse. Since ashigarus' change to the professional soldier was advanced after Oda Nobunaga, the ashigaru gradually separated from the farmer.

When entering the Edo period, the ashigaru's position was fixed and the use of conscripts was abandoned for over two hundred years in Japan. Ashigaru were considered to be the lowest rung of the samurai class in some han (domains), but not in others.

== Gallery ==
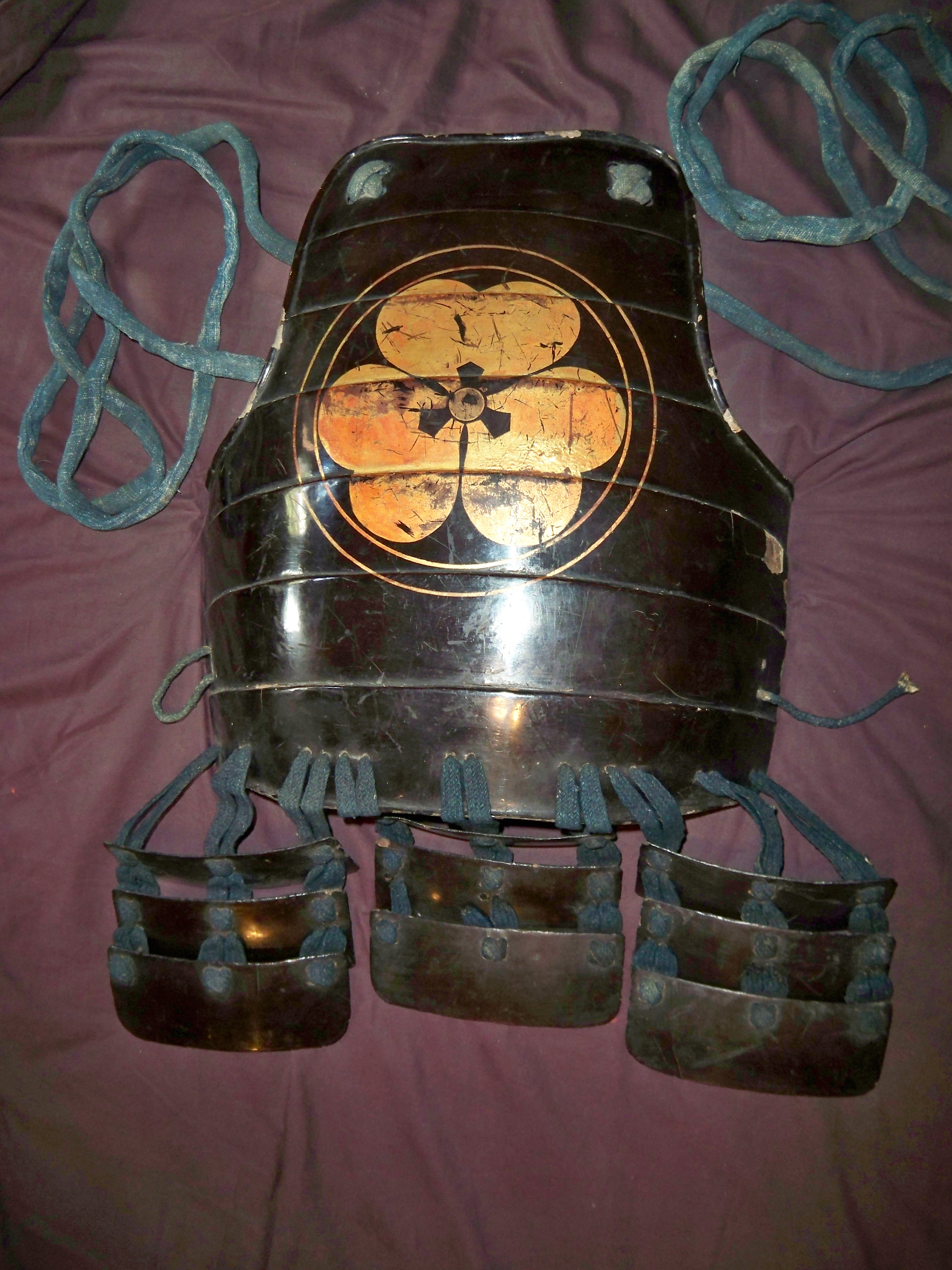
Edo-period single-piece breastplate hara-ate dō. Lacquered iron plates with cloth back strap.

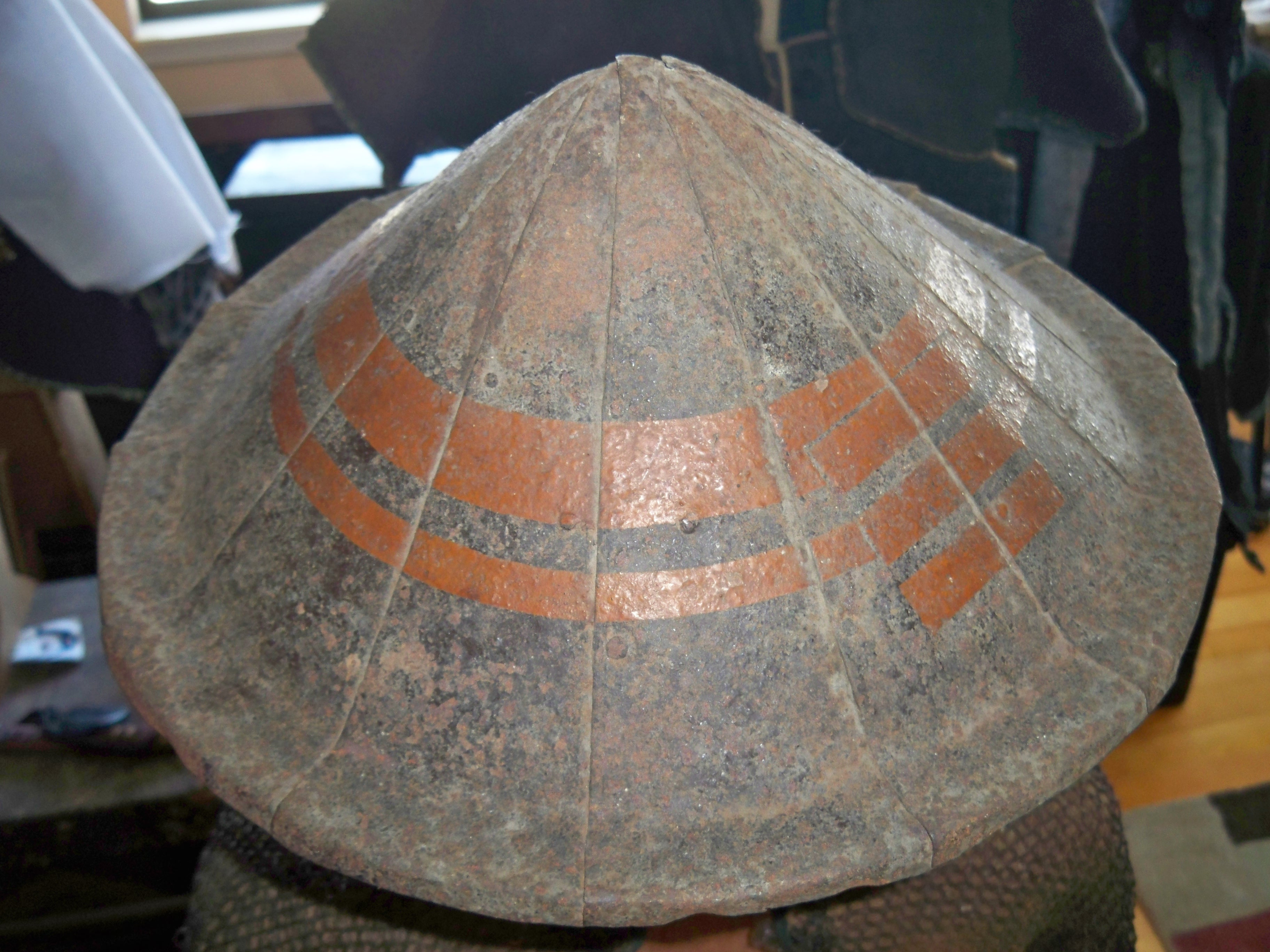
Edo-period jingasa

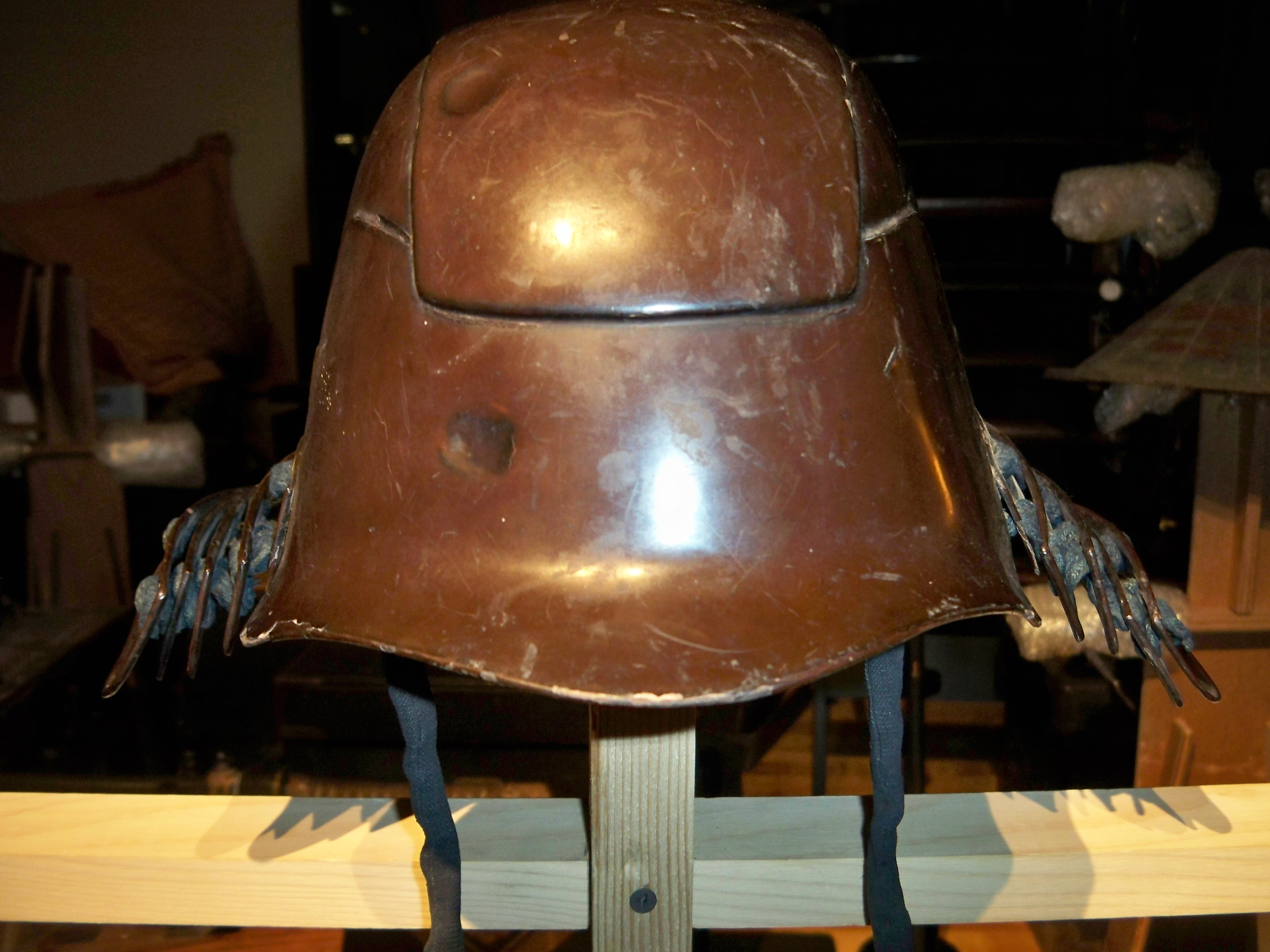
Edo-period Kabuto helmet of the zunari style, plain with no front crest holder

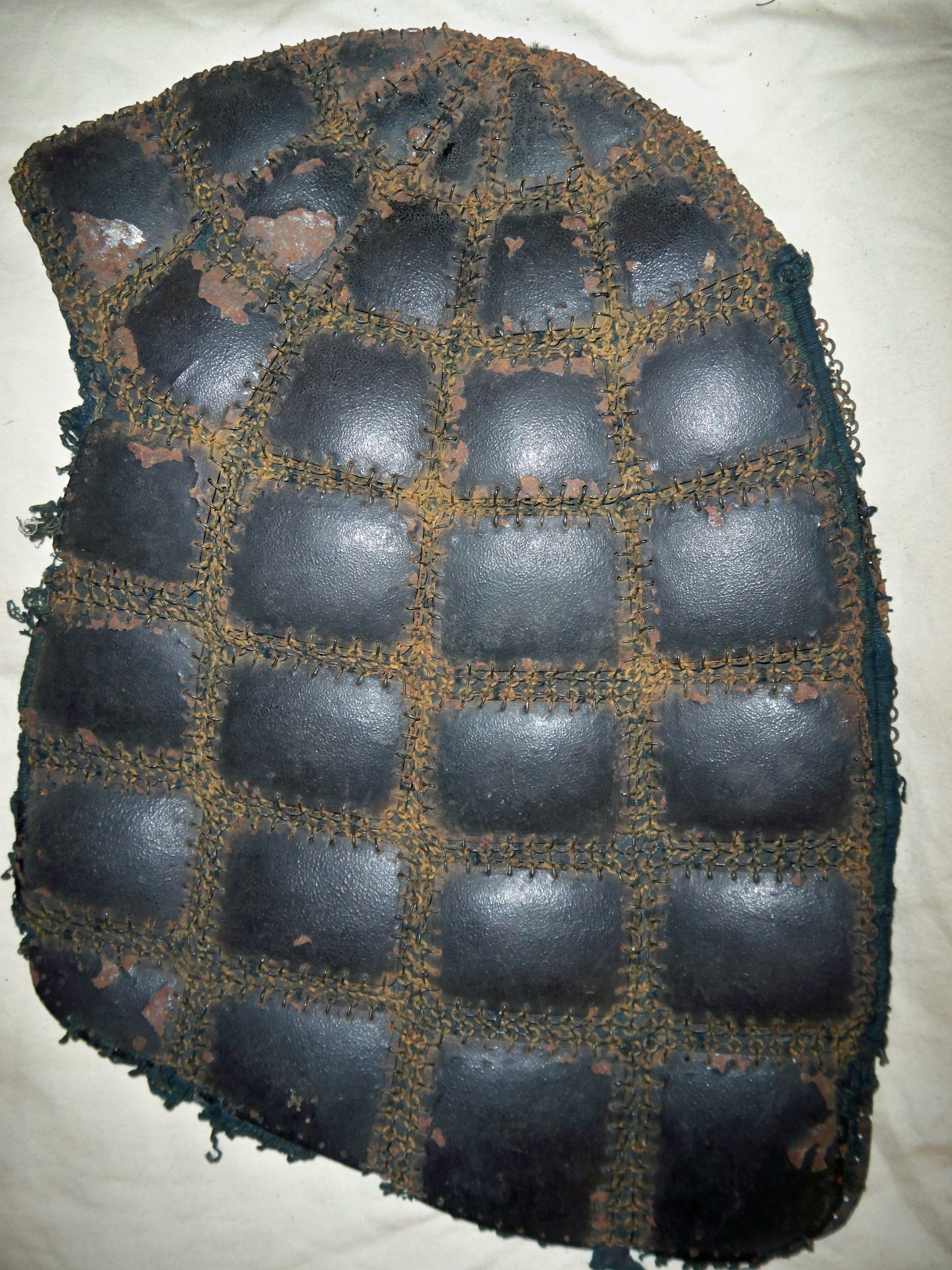
Edo-period karuta zukin, an armored hood from with iron cards and mail

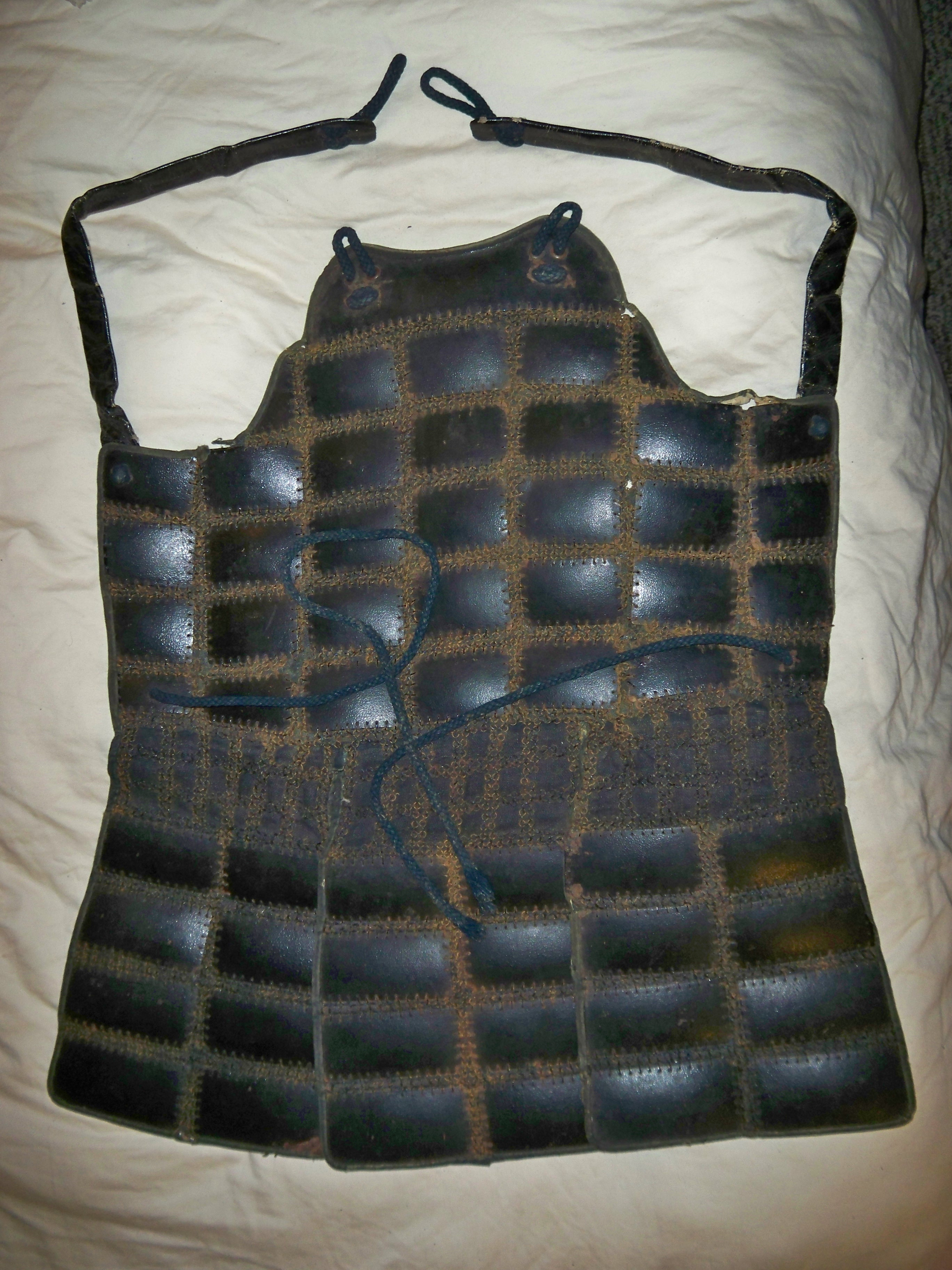
Edo-period karuta tatami dō in the hara-ate style

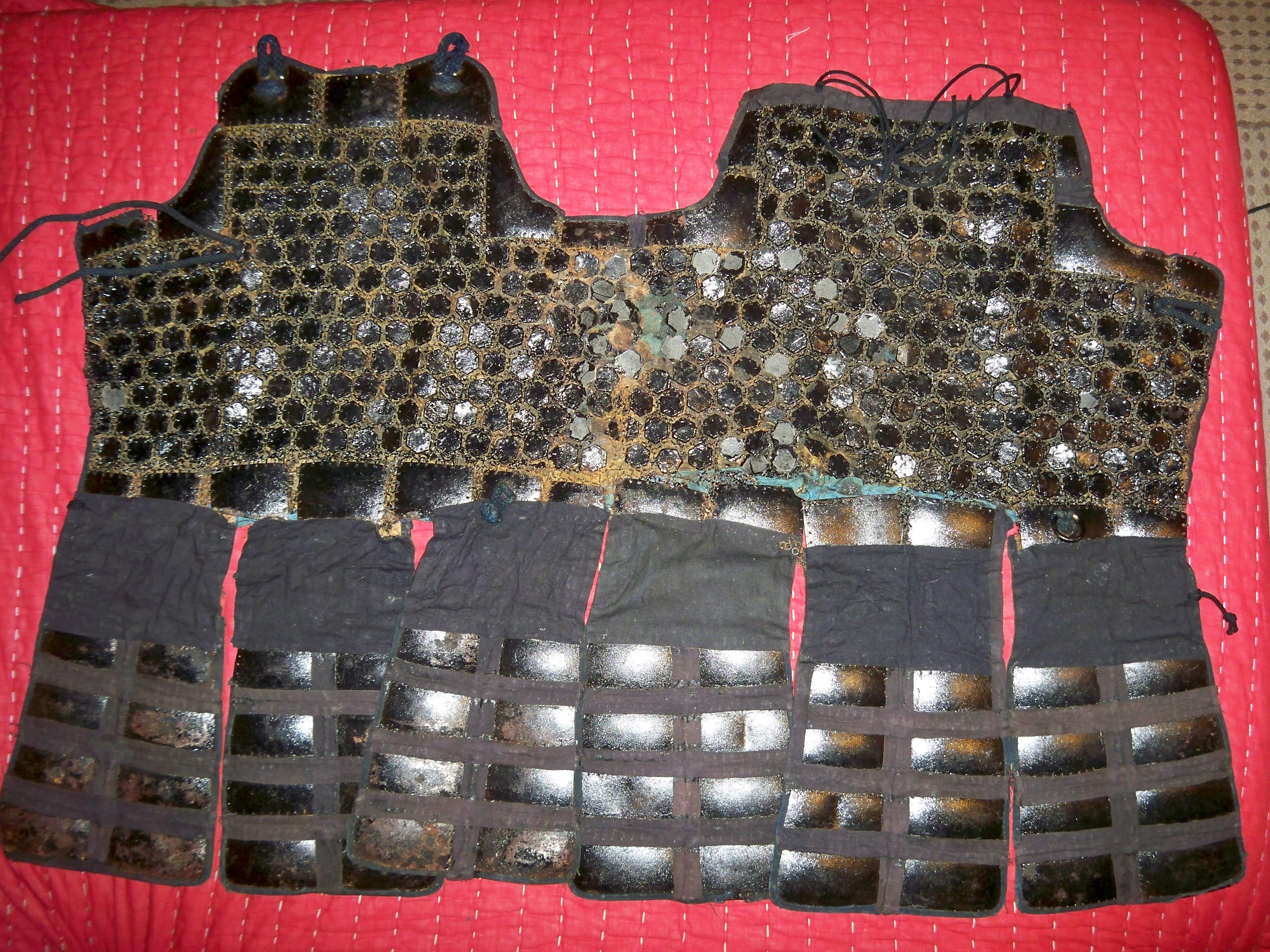
Edo-period kikko tatami dō. A collapsible cuirass made with small hexagonal iron plates.

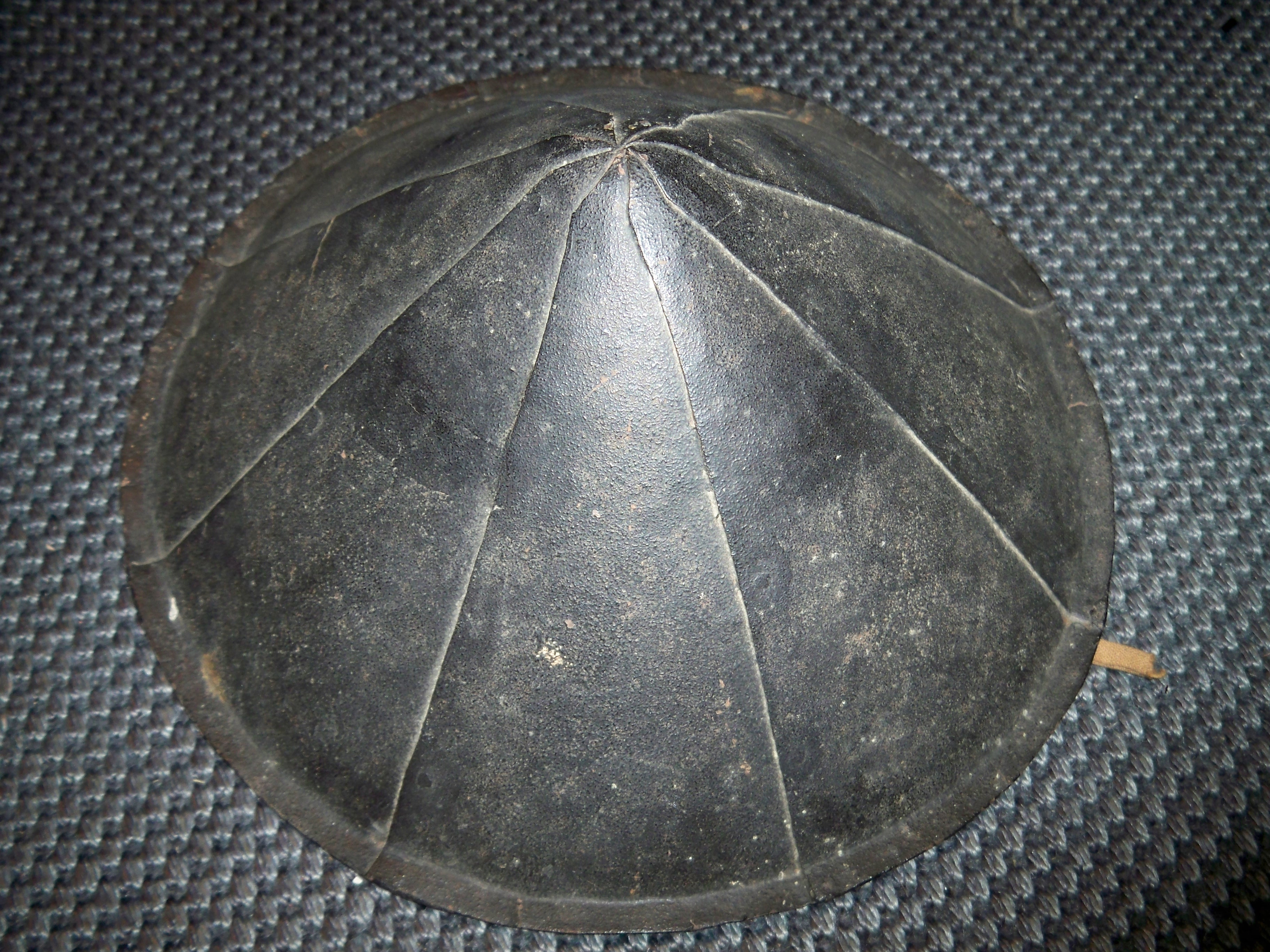
Edo-period iron jingasa, eight iron plates riveted together

== See also ==
- Infantry
