= Kasa (hat) =

Traditional Japanese hat

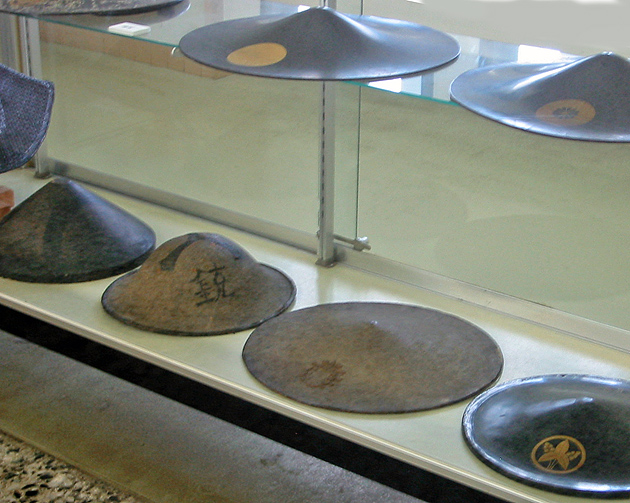
This display case at Gifu Castle shows many kasa of the type known as jingasa.

A kasa (笠) is any one of several traditional Japanese hats. Examples include amigasa and jingasa.

== Grammar and etymology ==
Kasa is the correct way to pronounce the word when it stands alone. Rendaku causes kasa to change to -gasa when it is preceded by another word specifying the type of hat, as in jingasa.

Kasa shares its etymology with the Japanese word for "umbrella" (also pronounced kasa, but written as 傘).

== Types of kasa ==
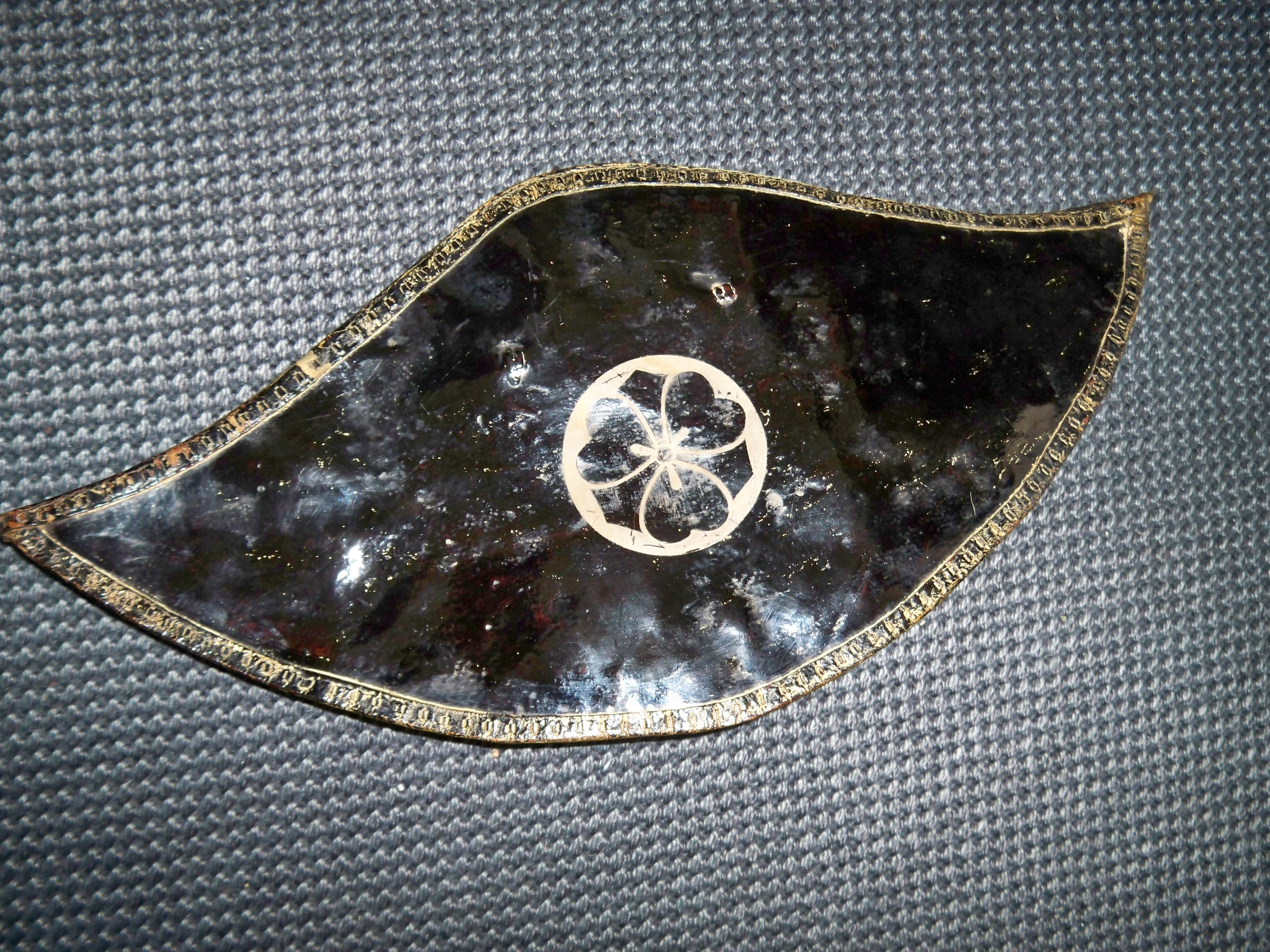
Antique Japanese samurai leather jingasa (war hat) in the nirayama style.

A number of different styles of kasa have been used throughout most all levels of Japanese society.

Some types of kasa include:

- Ajirogasa (網代笠): a wickerwork kasa made of shaven bamboo or wood.
- Amigasa (編み笠): a wickerwork kasa. An amigasa is a straw hat of the type traditionally worn in some Japanese folk dances.
- Fukaamigasa (深編み笠): a deep wickerwork kasa.
- Jingasa (陣笠): a type of kasa commonly worn by samurai and ashigaru. The samurai class in feudal Japan, as well as their retainers and footsoldiers, used several types of jingasa made from iron, copper, wood, paper, bamboo, or leather. Jingasa almost always had crests on them.
- Rōningasa (浪人笠): typically a conical amigasa with a flat top, often worn by rōnin.
- Sandogasa (三度笠): a bamboo kasa for traveling with a wide, flat shape that offered protection from the sun and rain. Favored by sando hikyaku, couriers who regularly traveled between Edo and Kyoto.
- Sugegasa (菅笠): a conical, pointed wickerwork kasa made of sedge. This hat shape is called a nón lá in Vietnam or do'un in Cambodia.
- Takuhatsugasa (托鉢笠): a Buddhist mendicant's kasa. A woven rice-straw kasa worn by mendicant Buddhist monks, the takuhatsugasa is made overlarge and in a bowl or mushroom shape. Unlike an Asian conical hat, it does not come to a point, nor does it ride high on the head like a samurai's traveling hat, instead covering the upper half to two-thirds of the face, masking the identity of the monk and allowing him to travel undistracted on his journey.
- Tengai (天蓋): (see komusō)
- Torioigasa (鳥追笠): a folded kasa, worn for the Awa Dance Festival.
- Yagyūgasa (柳生笠): the family crest of Yagyū clan, not an actual kind of kasa.

== Gallery ==
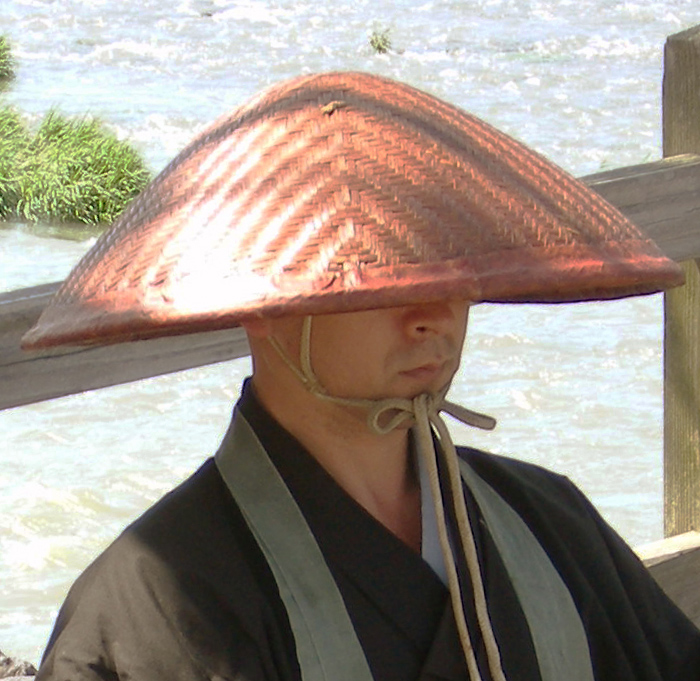
A Buddhist monk wearing a takuhatsugasa.

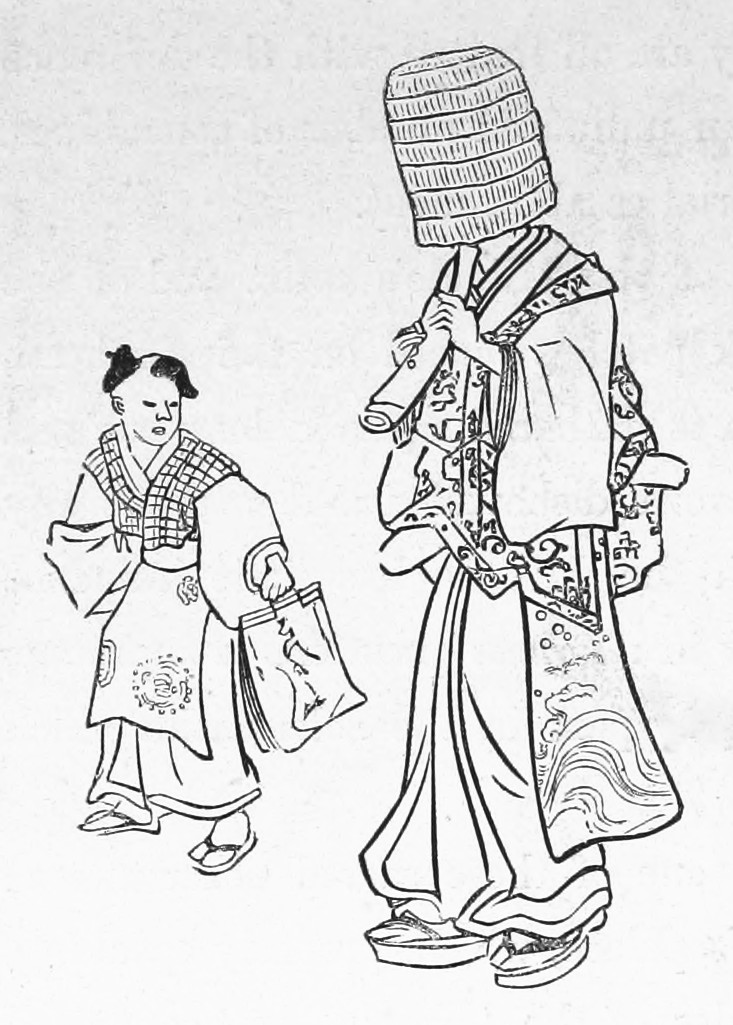
The hat in this print is a fukāmigasa of the sort known as tengai (天蓋), worn by komusō, mendicant monks of Fuke Zen.

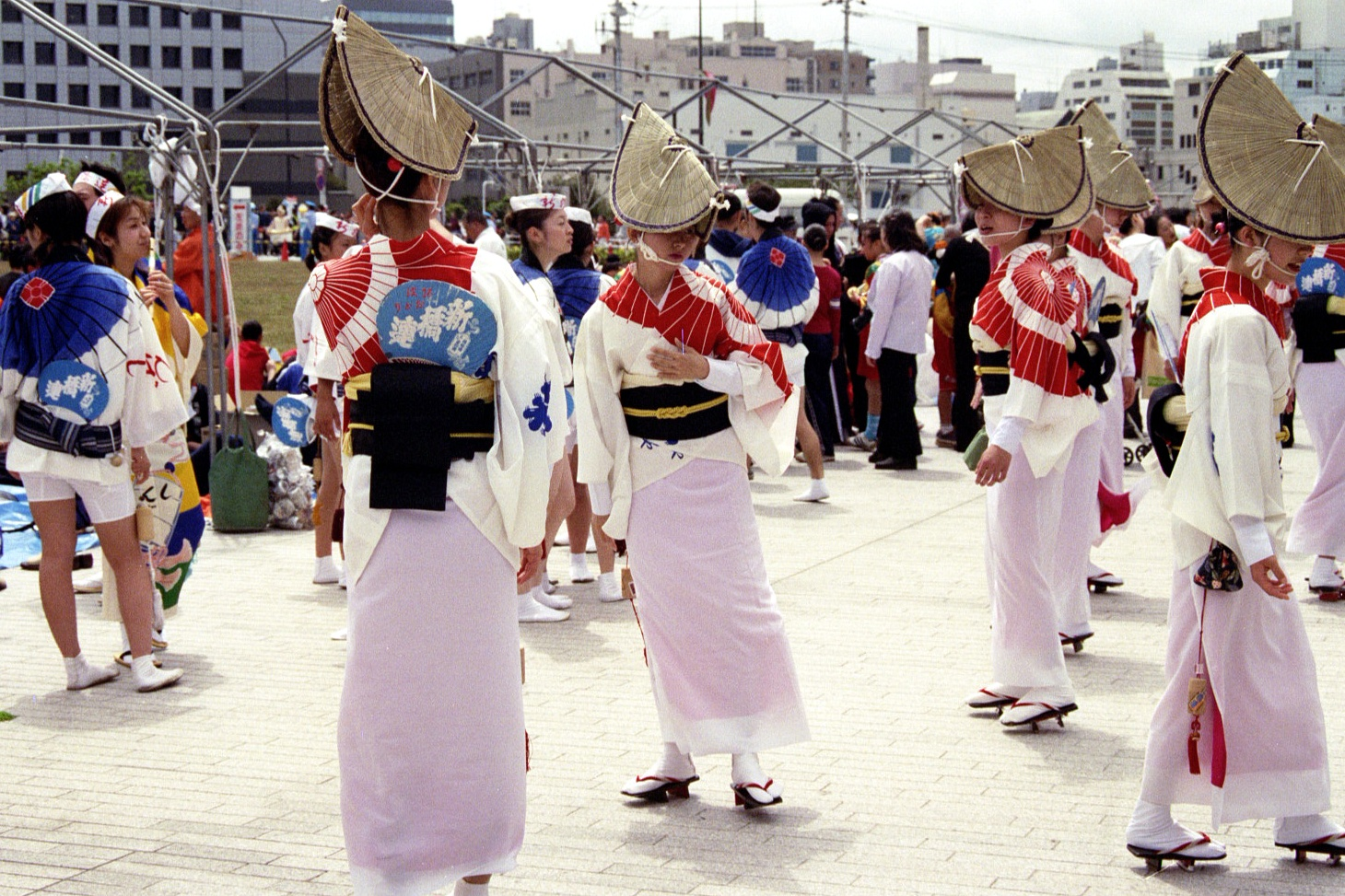
These women at the Awa Dance Festival wear the characteristic kasa of the dance.

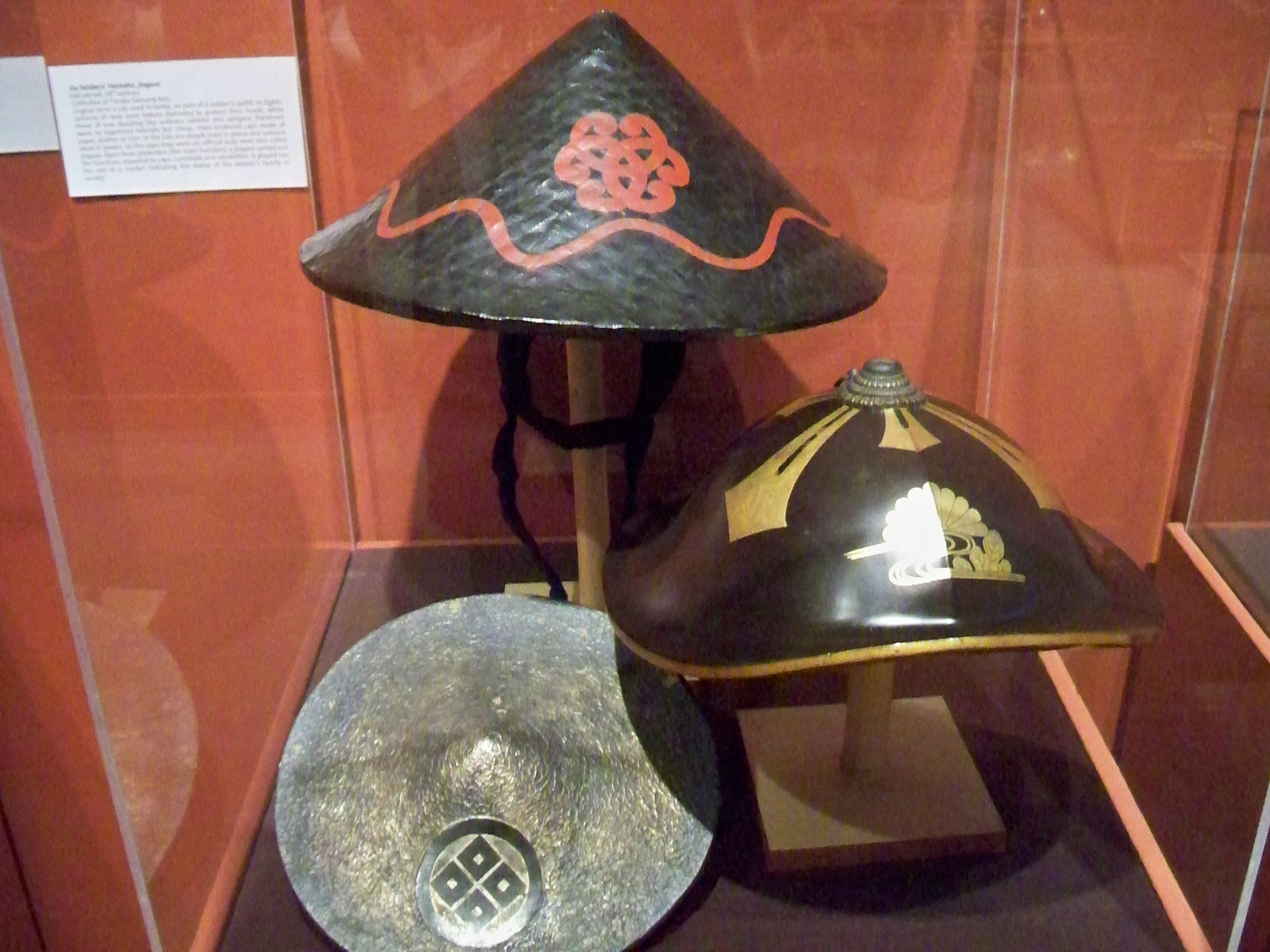
Various jingasa from the Return of the Samurai exhibition of Samurai art and artifacts, held in the Art Gallery of Greater Victoria, Canada in 2010.

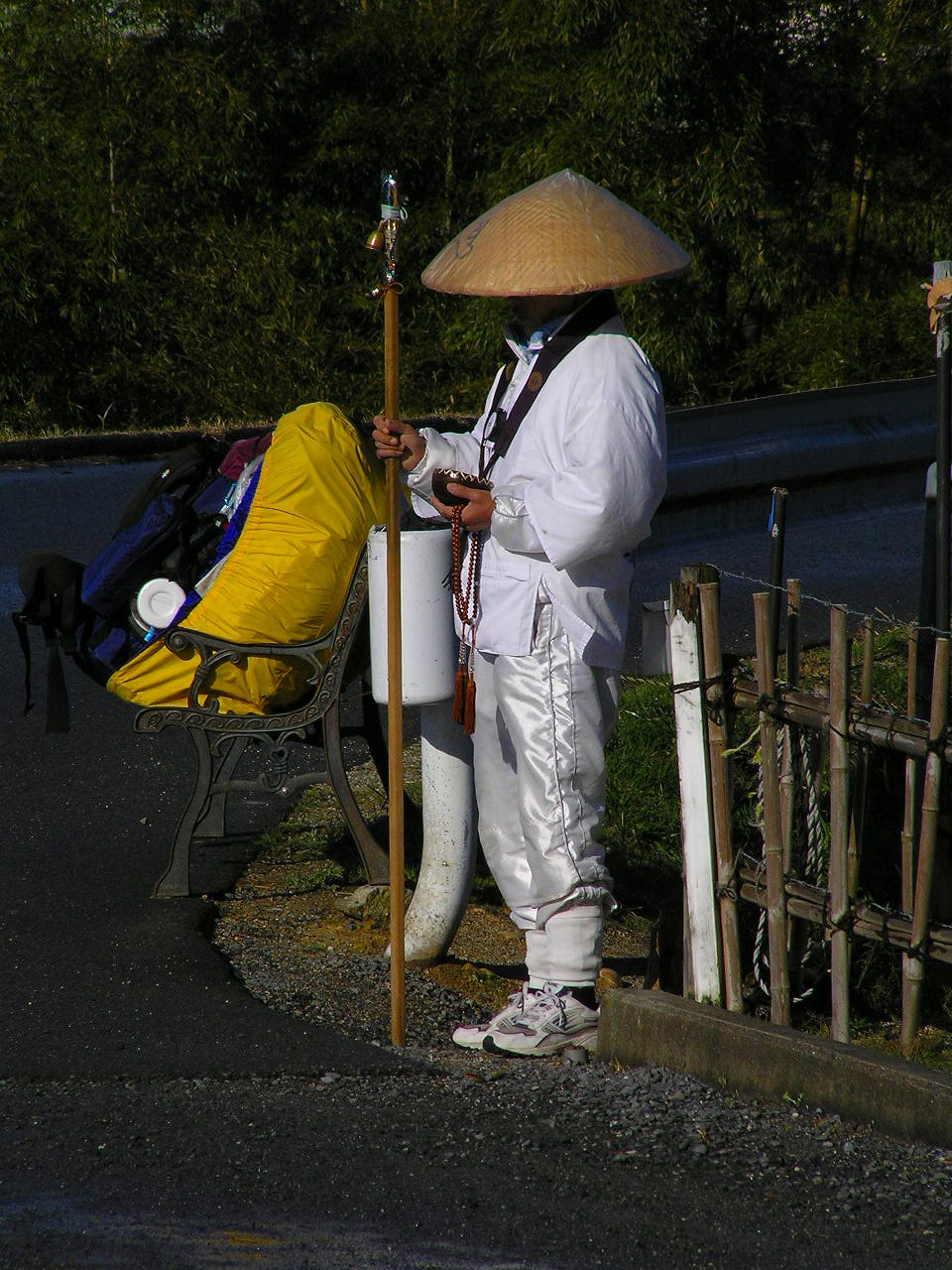
A Buddhist pilgrim asking for alms outside a Buddhist temple.

== See also ==
- Yatarō gasa ("Yataro's Travel Hat"), a 1957 film by Kazuo Mori
- List of hat styles
- Asian conical hat
