= Sangu (armour) =

Samurai armour

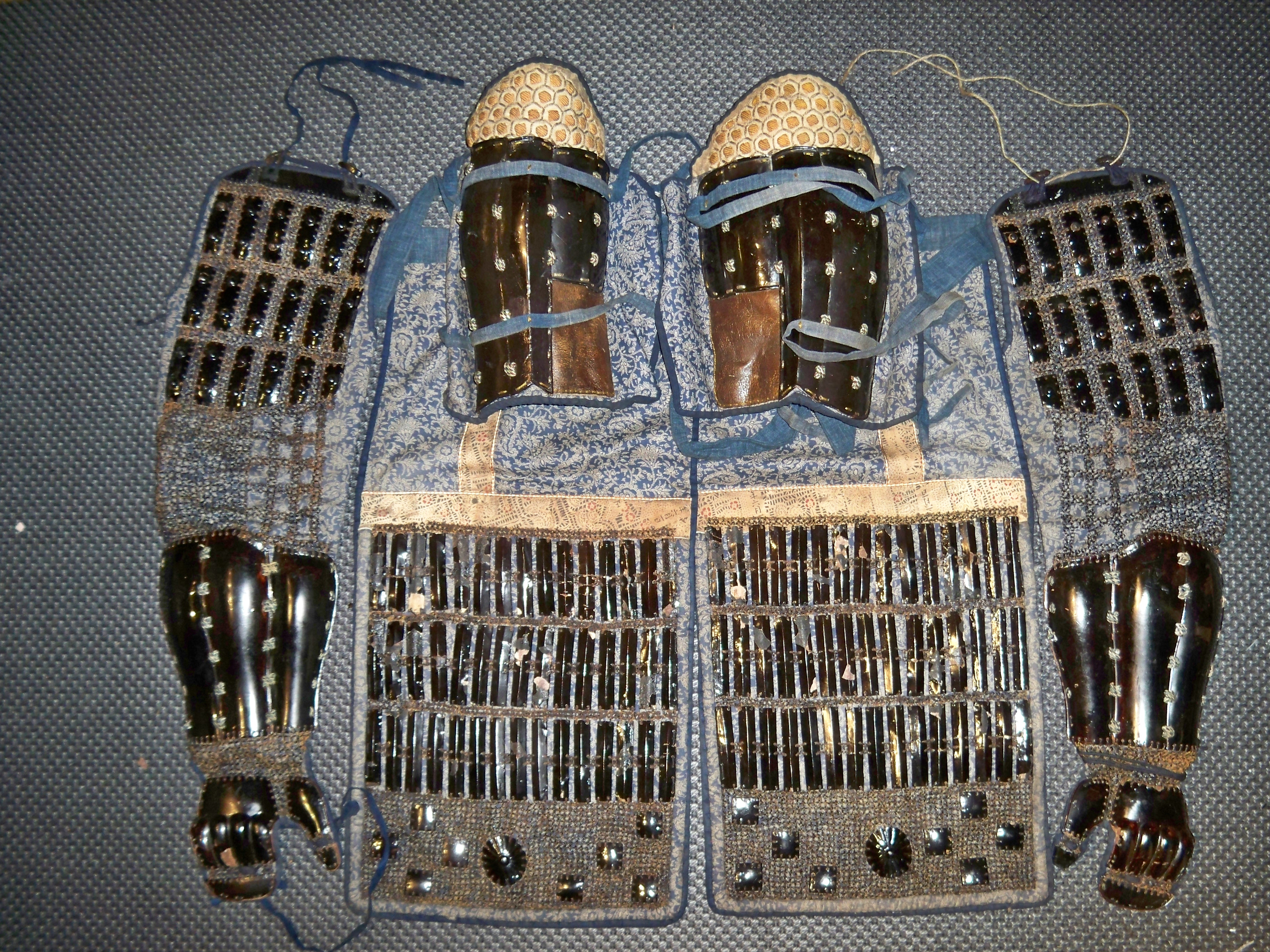
Antique Japanese (samurai) sangu, the three armours of the extremities, kote (armoured sleeves), suneate (shin armour), haidate (thigh armour)

Sangu is the term for the three armour components that protected the extremities of the samurai class of feudal Japan.

== Description ==
Traditional Japanese armour had six main components (hei-no-rokugu, roku gu, or roku gusoku), the dou or dō (chest armour), kabuto (helmet), mengu (facial armour), kote (armoured sleeves), sune-ate (shin armour), and the hai-date (thigh armour). The sangu was composed of the suneate (shin armour), kote (armored sleeves), haidate (thigh armour). These armour components were a combination of a cloth backing and various types of armour that was attached to the cloth backing. On an original authentic suit of Japanese armour (gusoku) the cloth backings, edgings, decorations etc. and the armour elements would all be matching to each other.

== Sangu ==
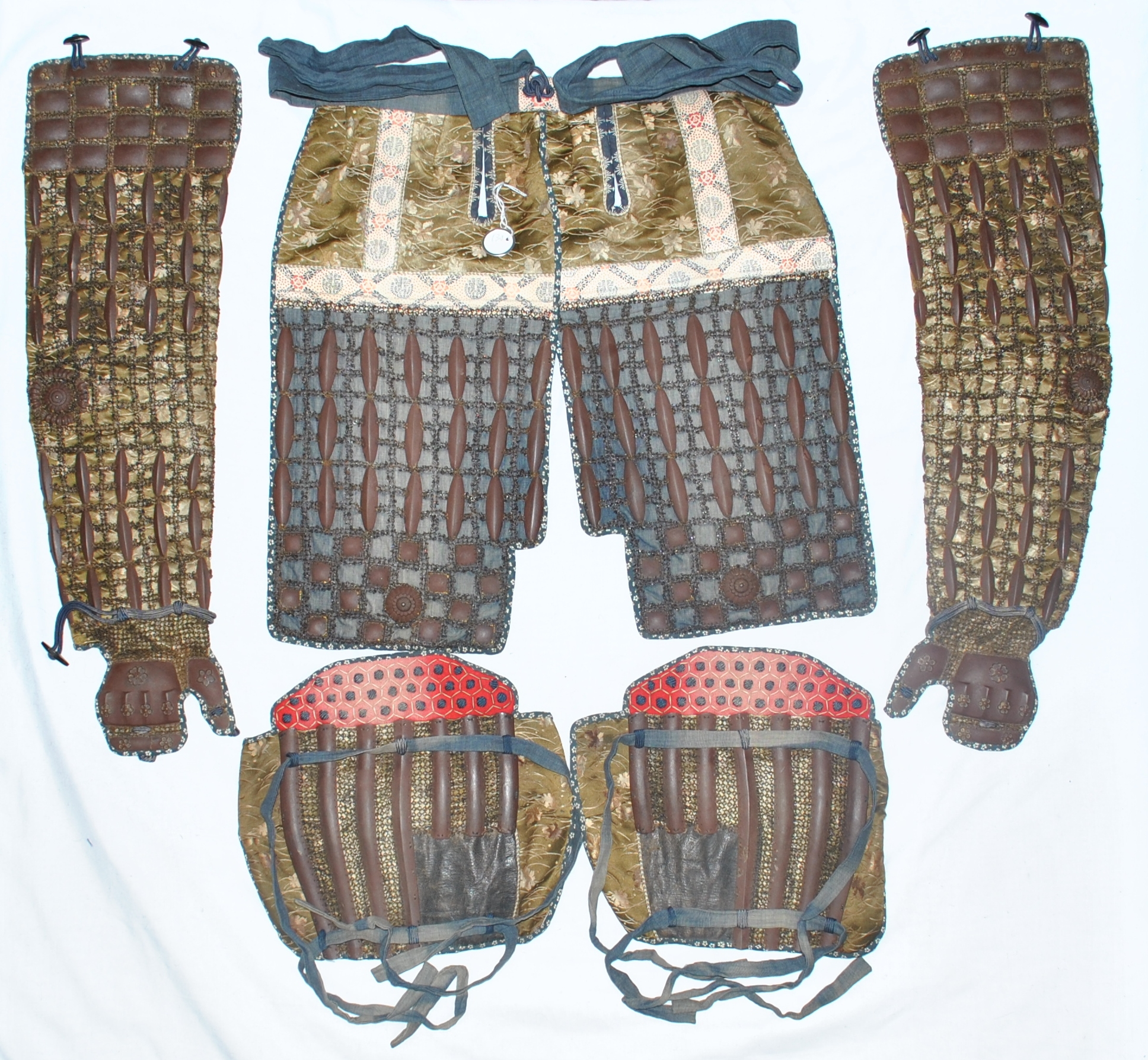

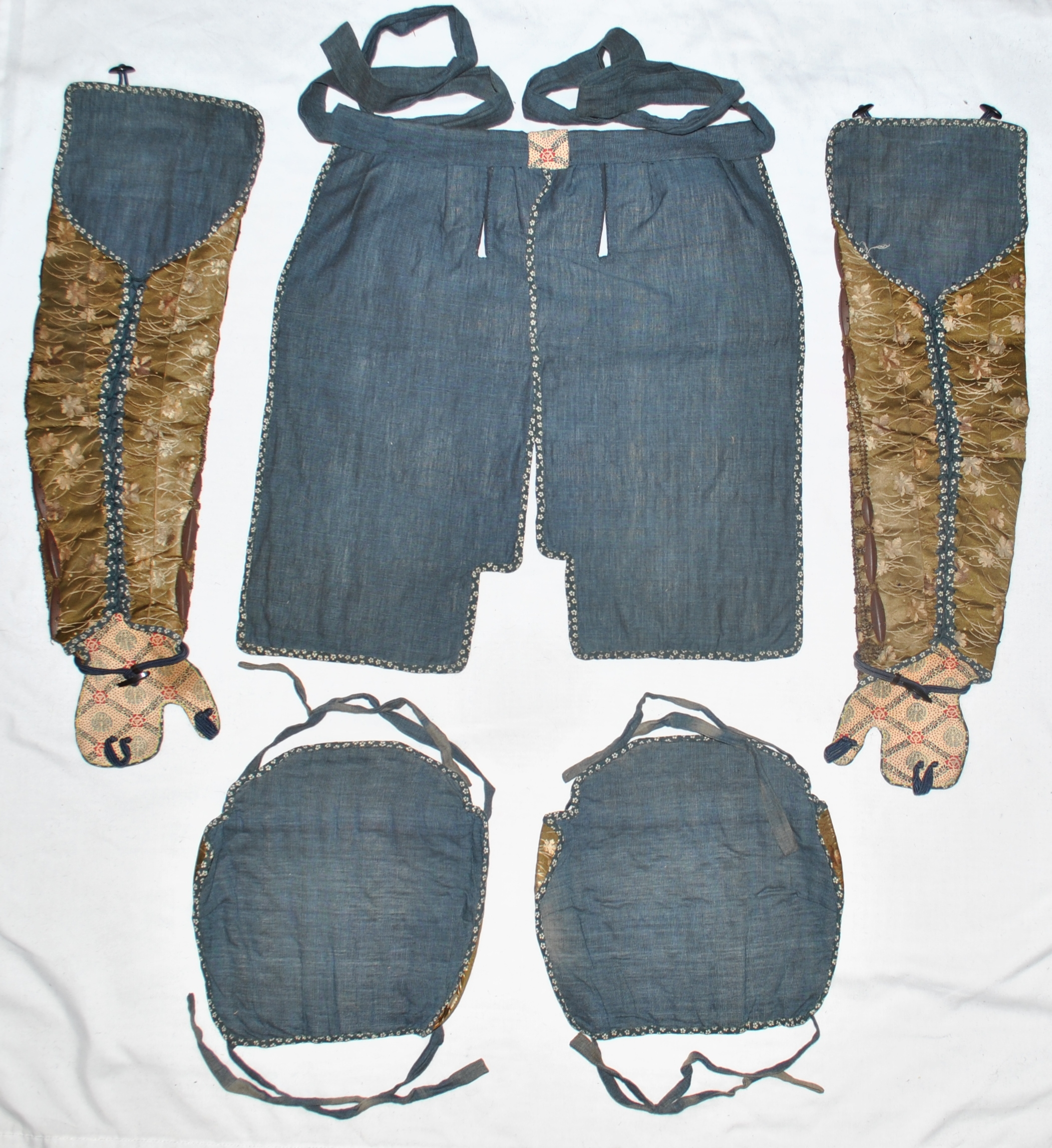

== Parts of the sangu ==
=== Kote ===
Kote (籠手, armored sleeves). These sleeves are usually of textile material, often silk brocade, padded, laced with the small cords upon the inside of the arm and covered with mail, small metal plates of various size and shape, or quilting having small plates of metal or hide sewn inside each quilt. Gauntlets (tekko), or covers of metal plates for the back of the hand, are attached to the kote. There are many varieties of kote such as ubu-dzutsu, bishamon (having sode (shoulder guards) attached, shino-odatsugi, ainaka-gote, and others including aigote (in which the two sleeves are connected), kigote which is a general term for the kote extended or completed by the addition of erisuwari (padded collar), kata-ate (shoulder pads) and wakabiki (armpit protectors), jubangote ( kote with shirt), tominaga kote (named after its inventor), kusari kote (chain armour), kote haramaki ( kote that cover even the belly), kogusoku-kote (armor-like kote ), han kote (half kote gauntlets).

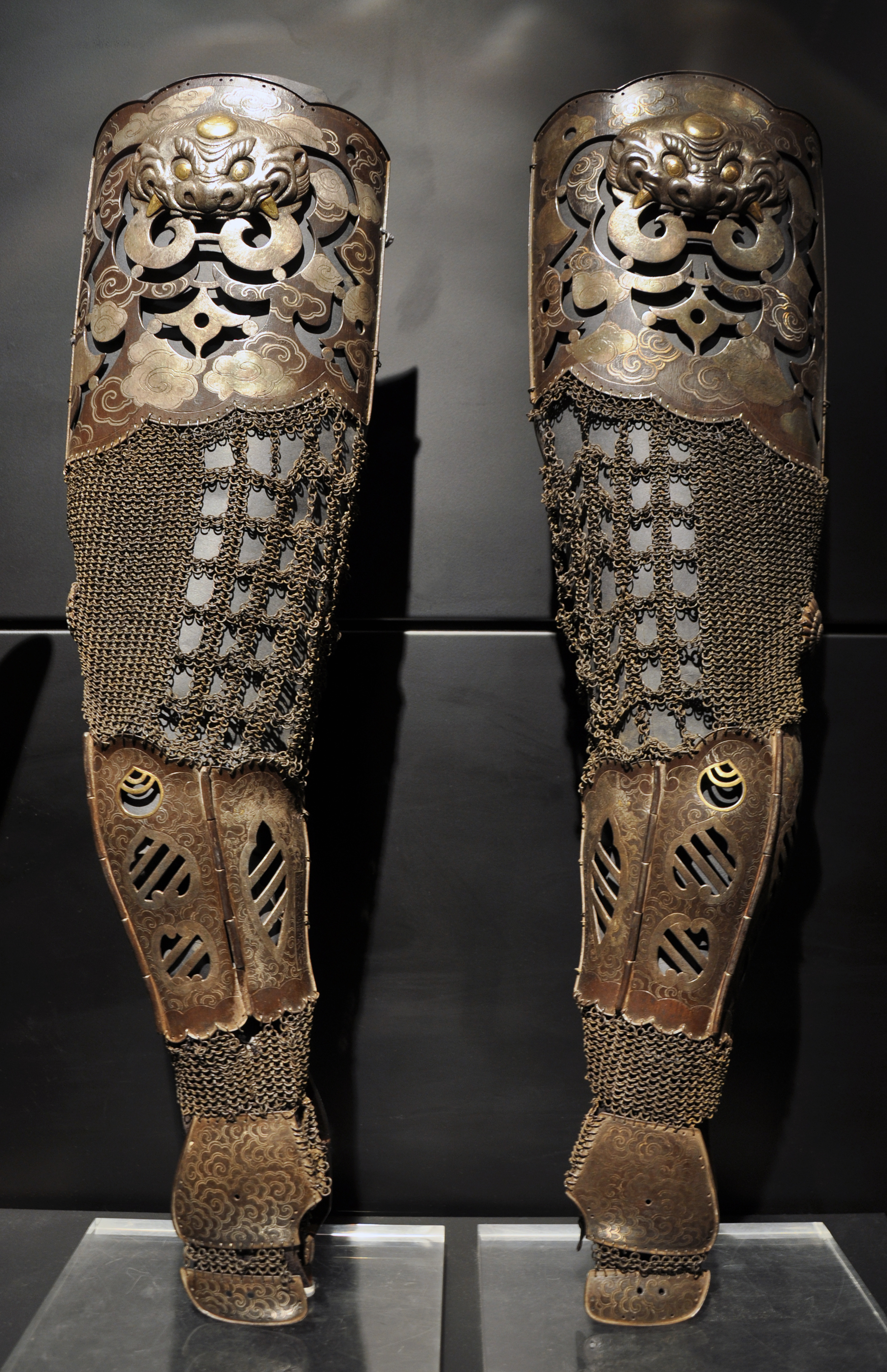
Signed by Myochin Ki no Munesada, iron and silver, Edo Period, about 1790. Ann and Gabriel Barbier-Mueller Museum, Dallas (Texas).

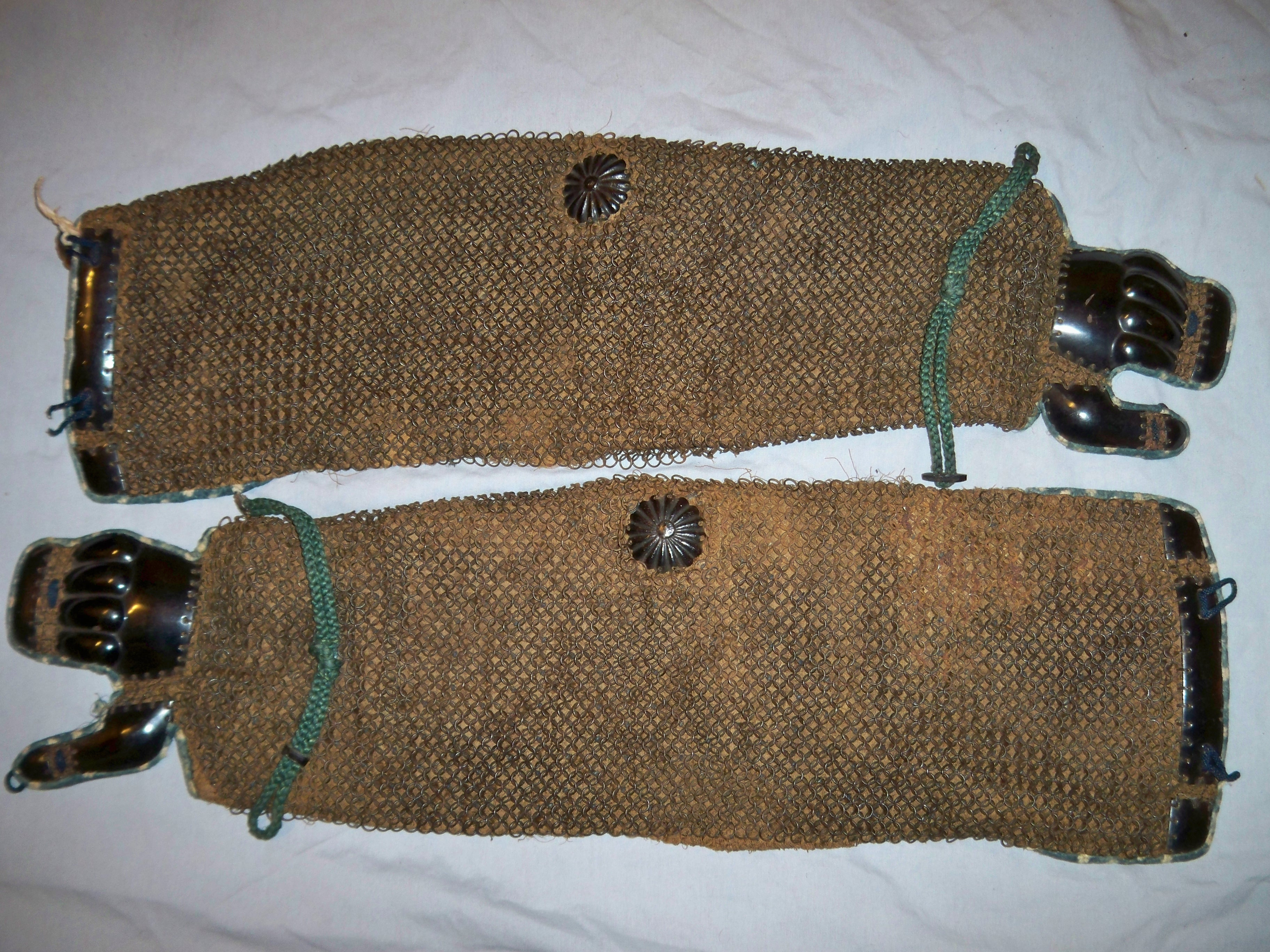
Kusari kote

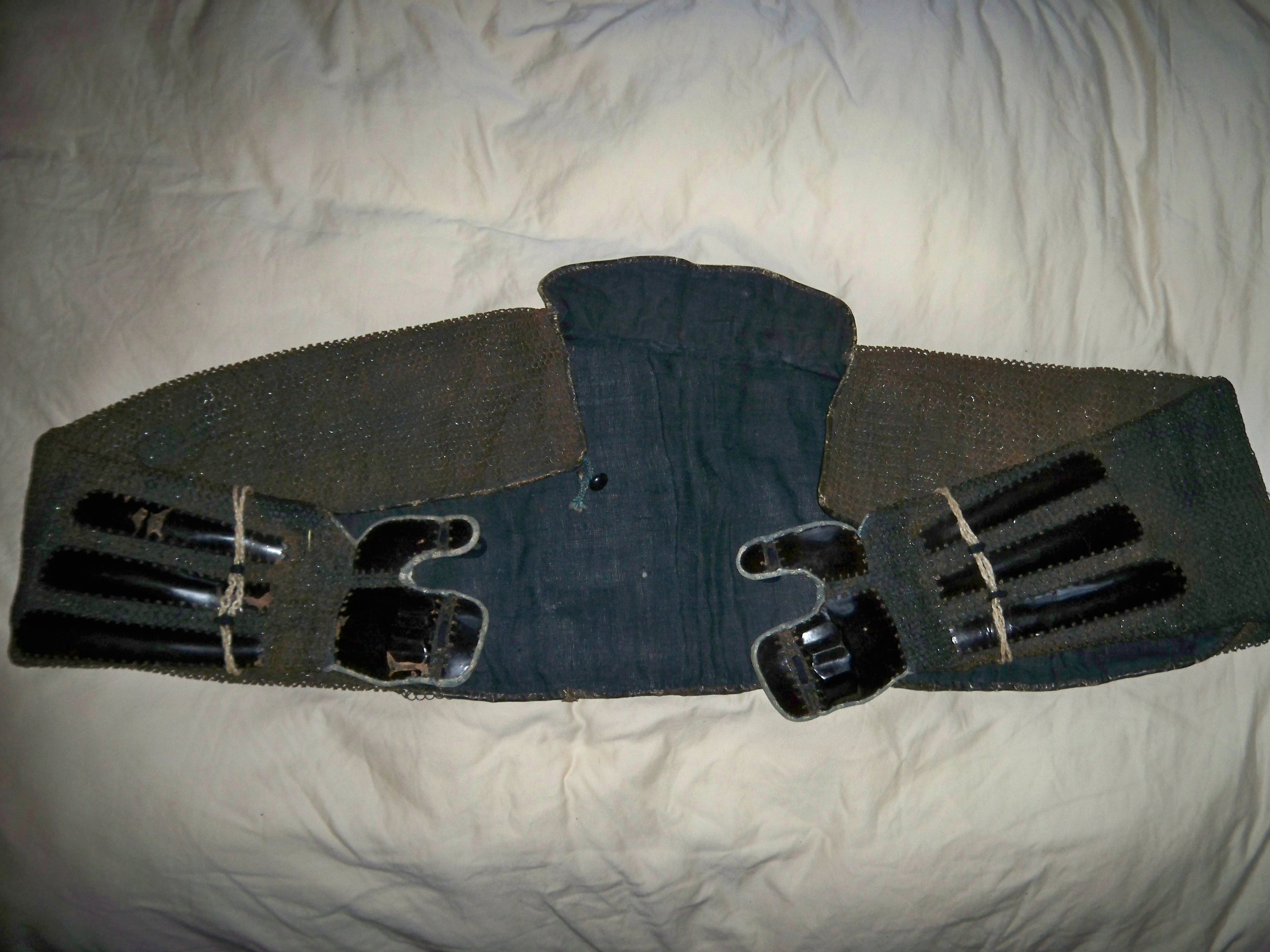
Sashinuki kote (kote formed into a short jacket)

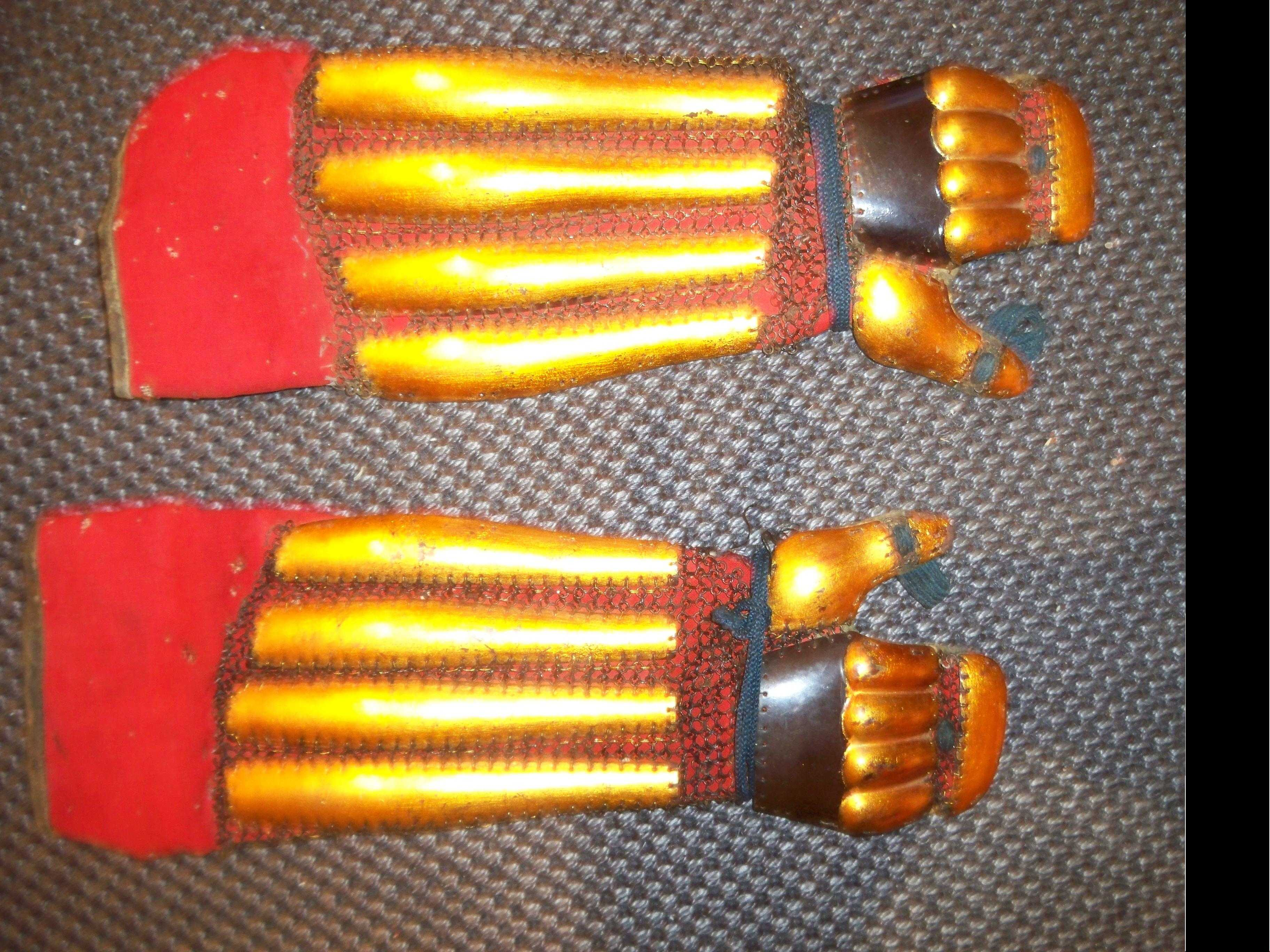
Han kote (half kote gauntlets)

=== Suneate ===
Suneate (臑当, literally shin guards) are a type of armoured shin protection worn by the samurai class and their retainers during the feudal era of Japan. Suneate first started being used in the 12th century. The suneate most commonly consisted of vertical armour plates of iron or leather connected by either hinges or mail armour (kusari), suneate could also be made almost entirely of mail. The plates were usually attached to a cloth backing which had cloth straps that were used to tie the suneate to the lower leg. There is usually a leather guard abumi-zure attached to the inner side of the place that will come into contact with the stirrup when riding. The more ancient examples of these shin-guards are seen as plates, often with rather large knee guards attached. When worn the abumi-zure of the suneate will be placed toward the inner side of the leg.

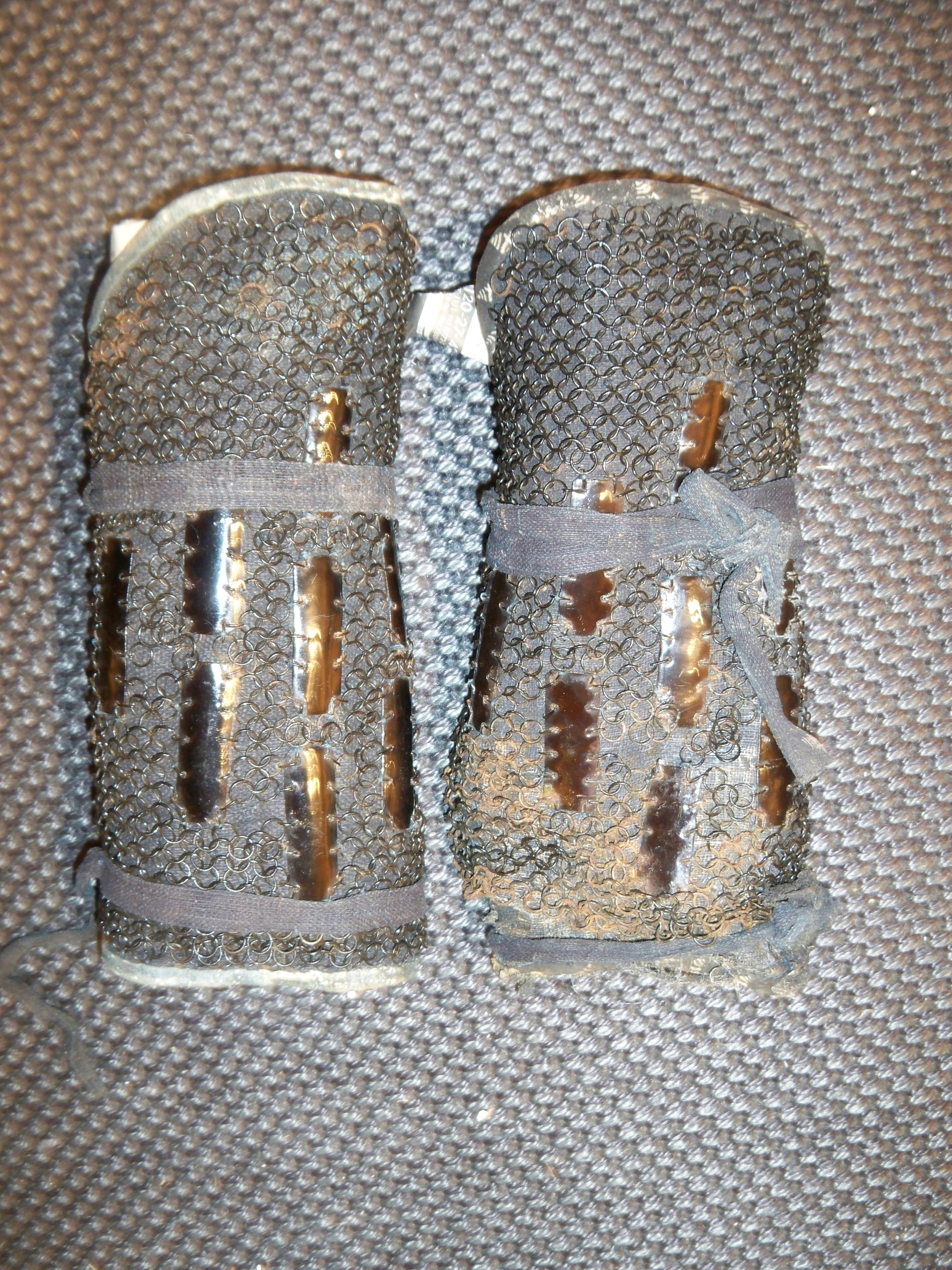
Edo period greaves (suneate), mail sewn with small armor plates (shino)

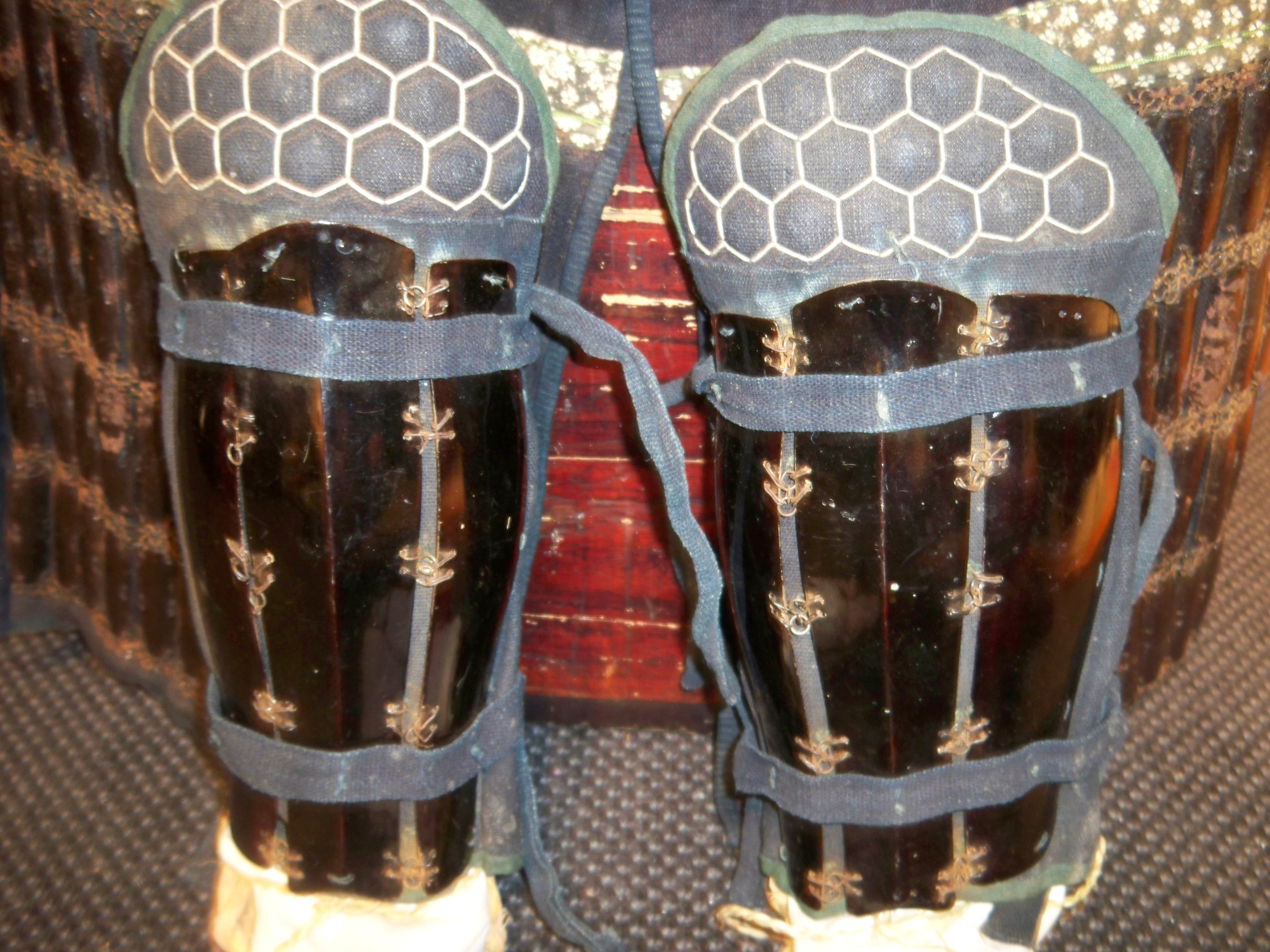
Antique Japanese (samurai) Edo period suneate. Greaves made from iron plates attached to cloth backing. The knee area has small hexagon armor plates kikko sewn inside the backing.

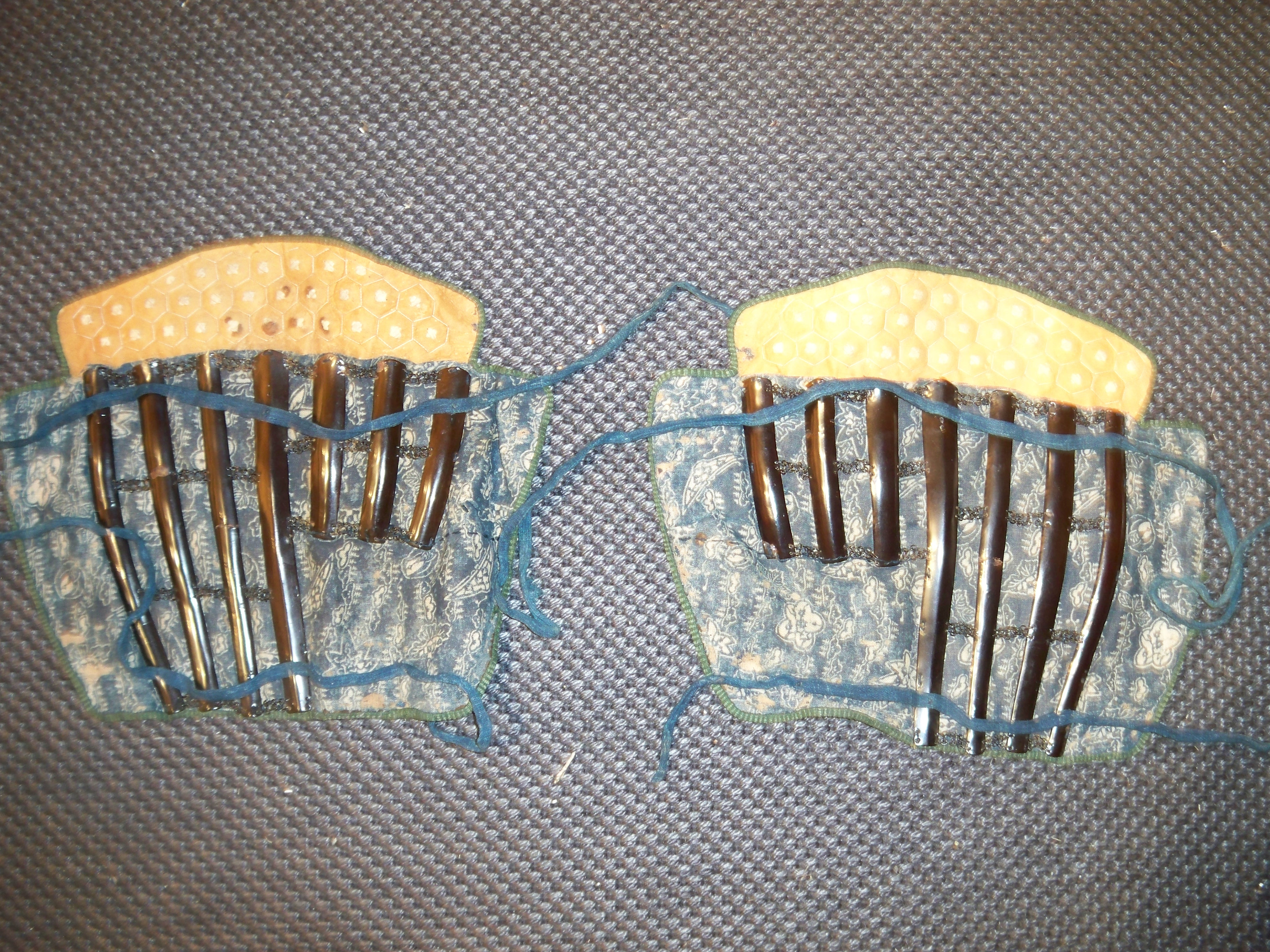
Antique Japanese (samurai) suneate, shin protection with iron splints shino connected by mail armor kusari sewn to a cloth backing, with small hexagon armor plates kikko protecting the knees

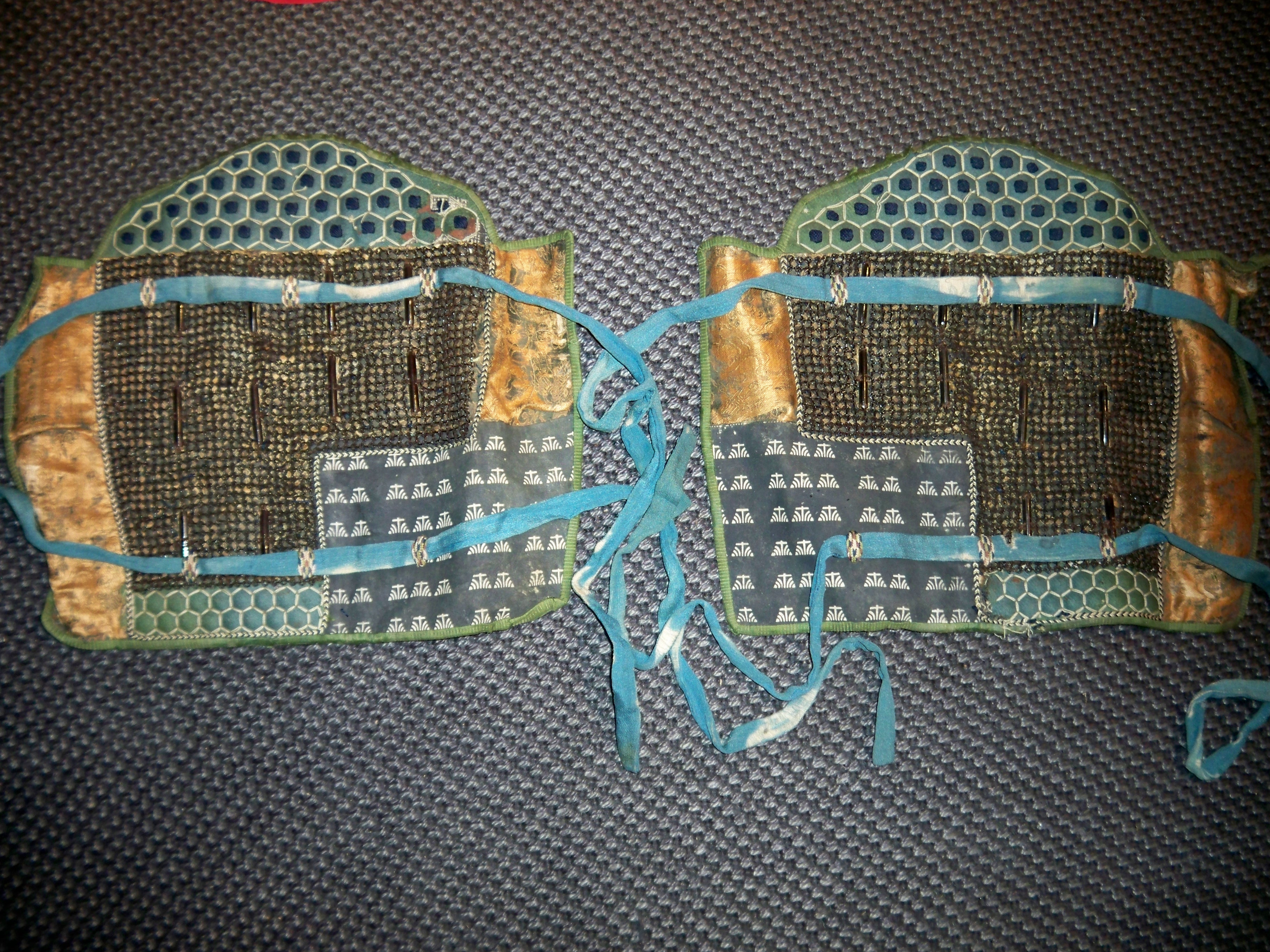
Antique Japanese kusari suneate

=== Haidate ===
Haidate (佩楯, thigh armour) was a type of cloth apron with various types of armour attached to the cloth backing.

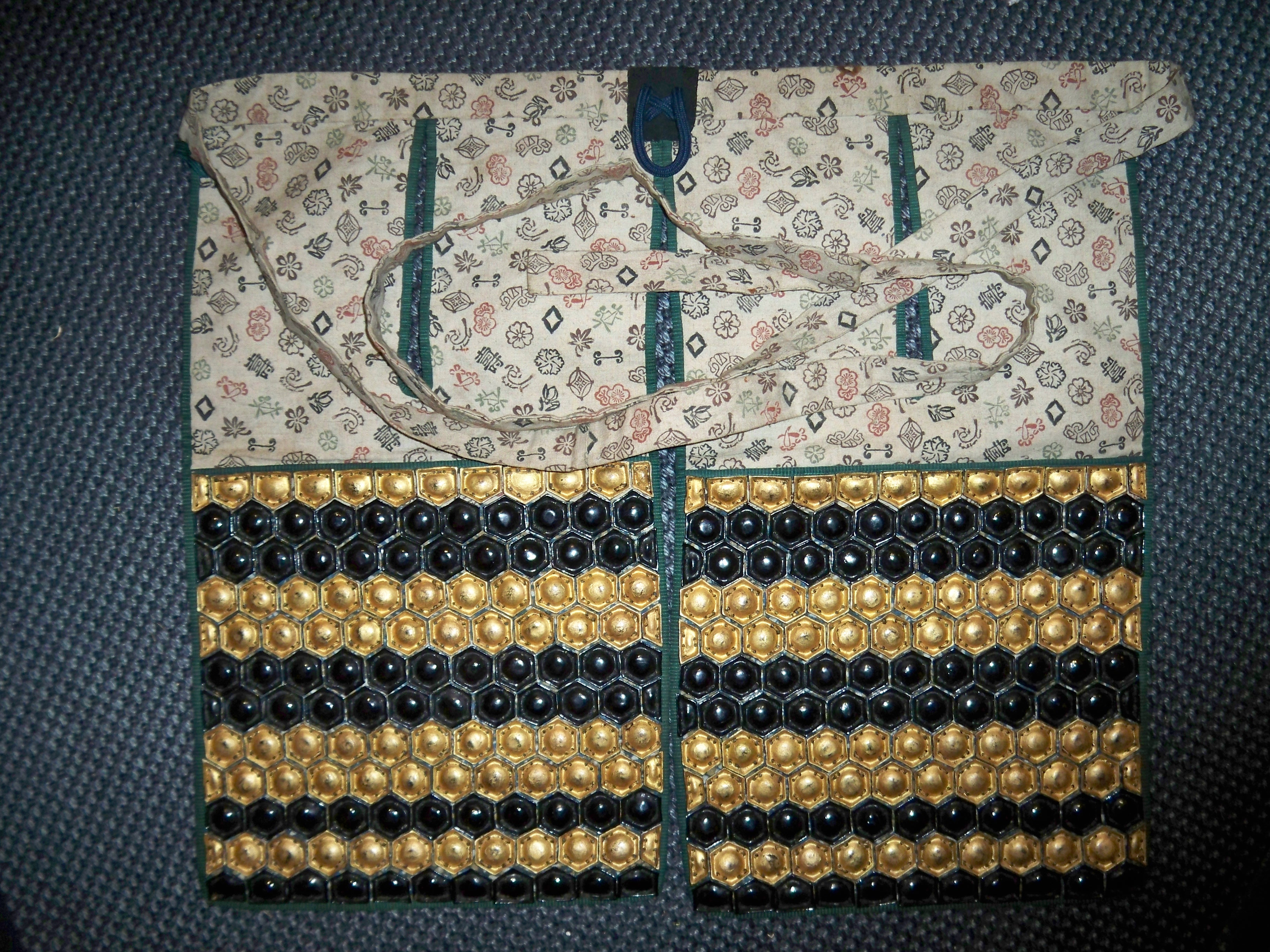
Haidate with kikko (small hexagon armour plates)

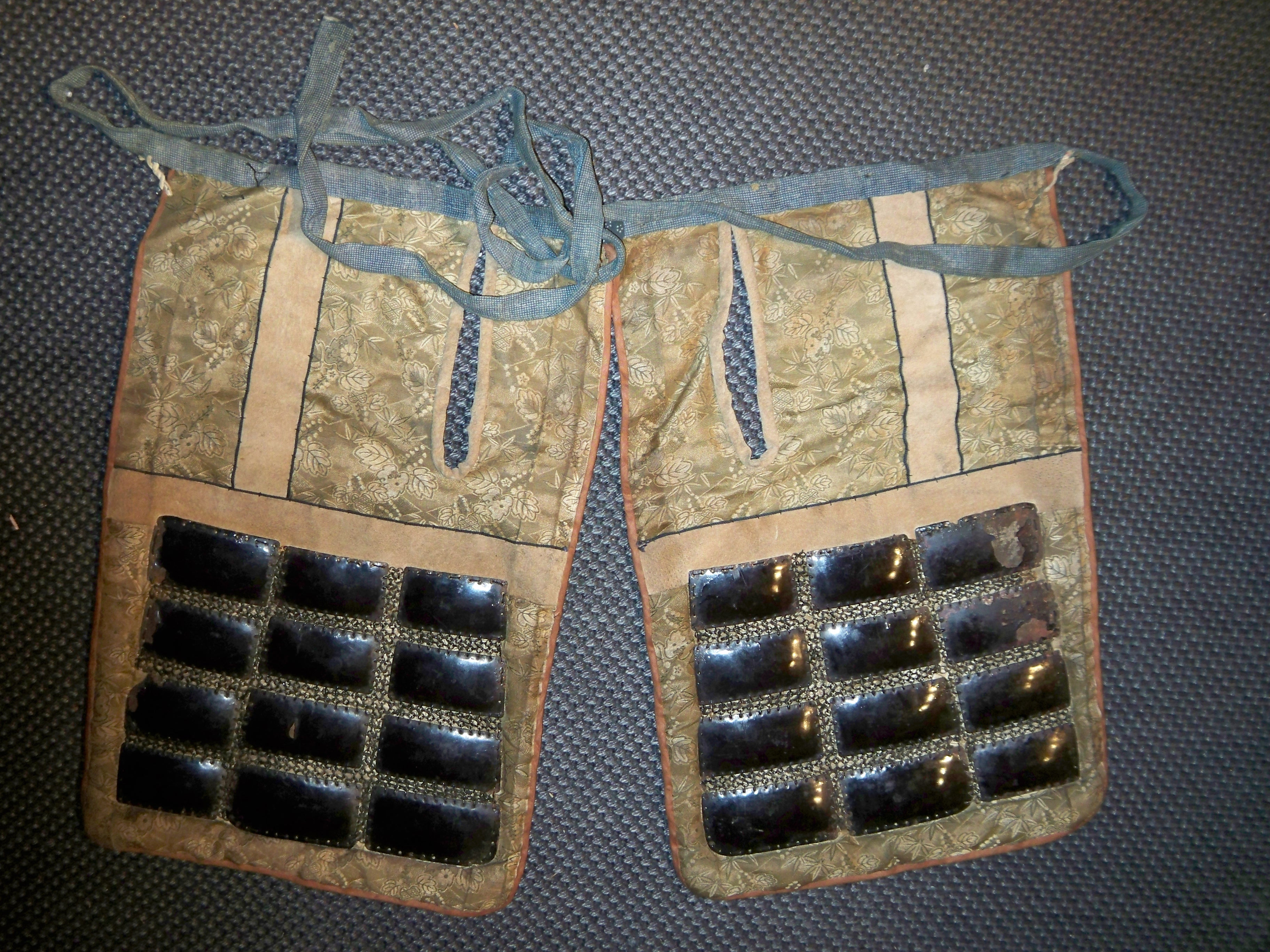
Haidate with karuta (small square or rectangular armour plates)

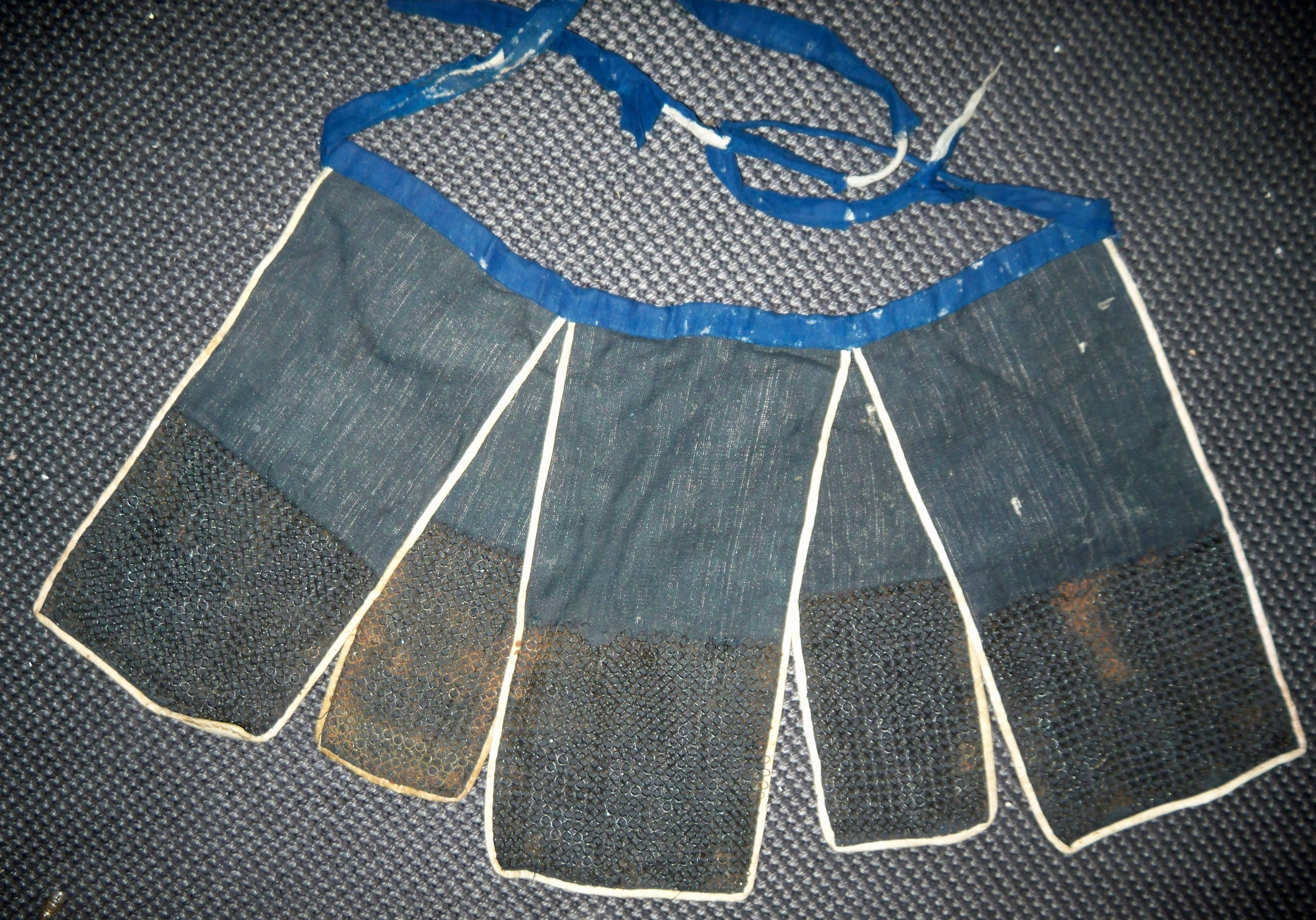
Haidate with kusari (chain armour)

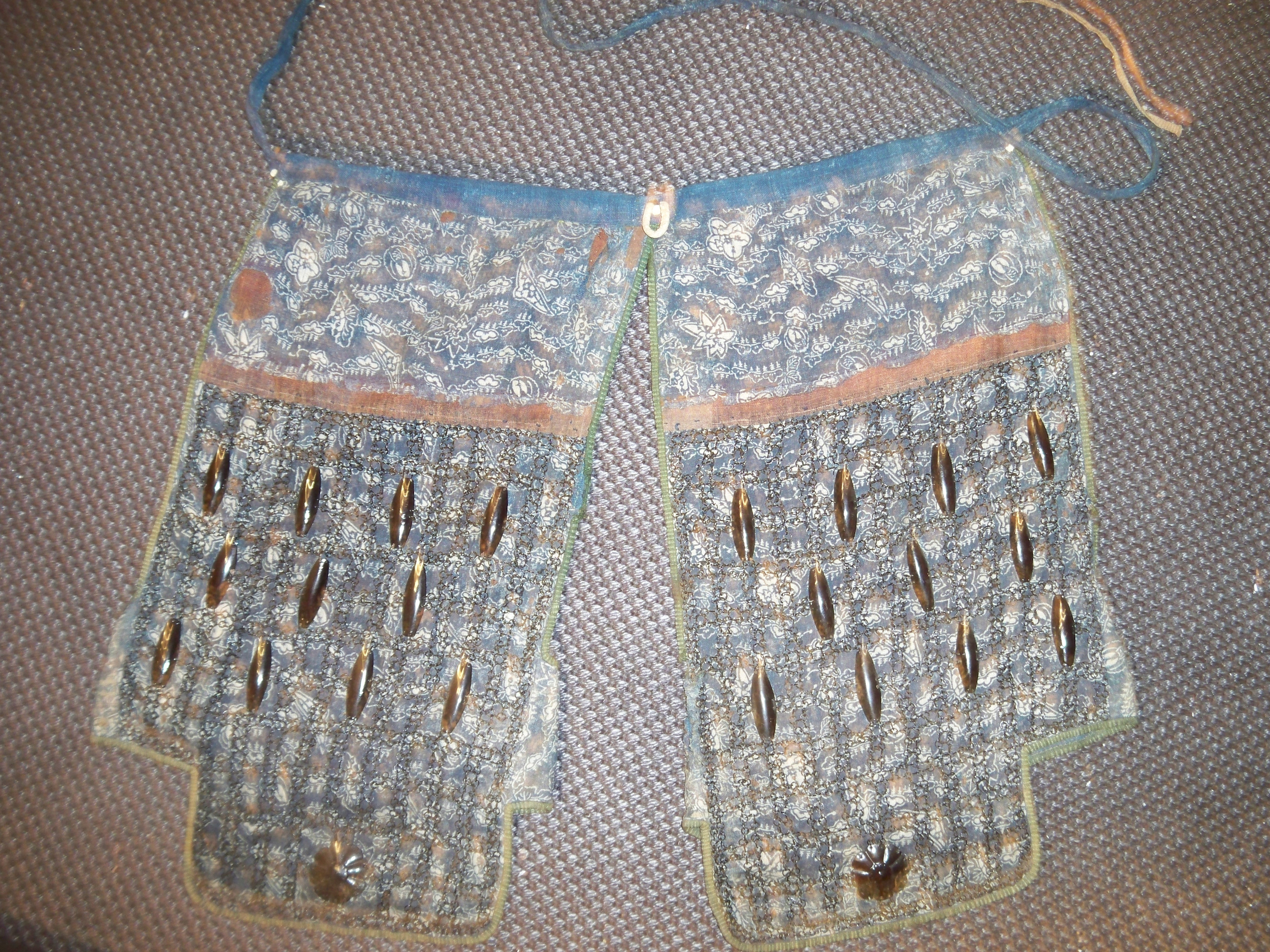

== See also ==
- Japanese armour
