= Chumash (Judaism) =

Printed Torah in the form of a codex

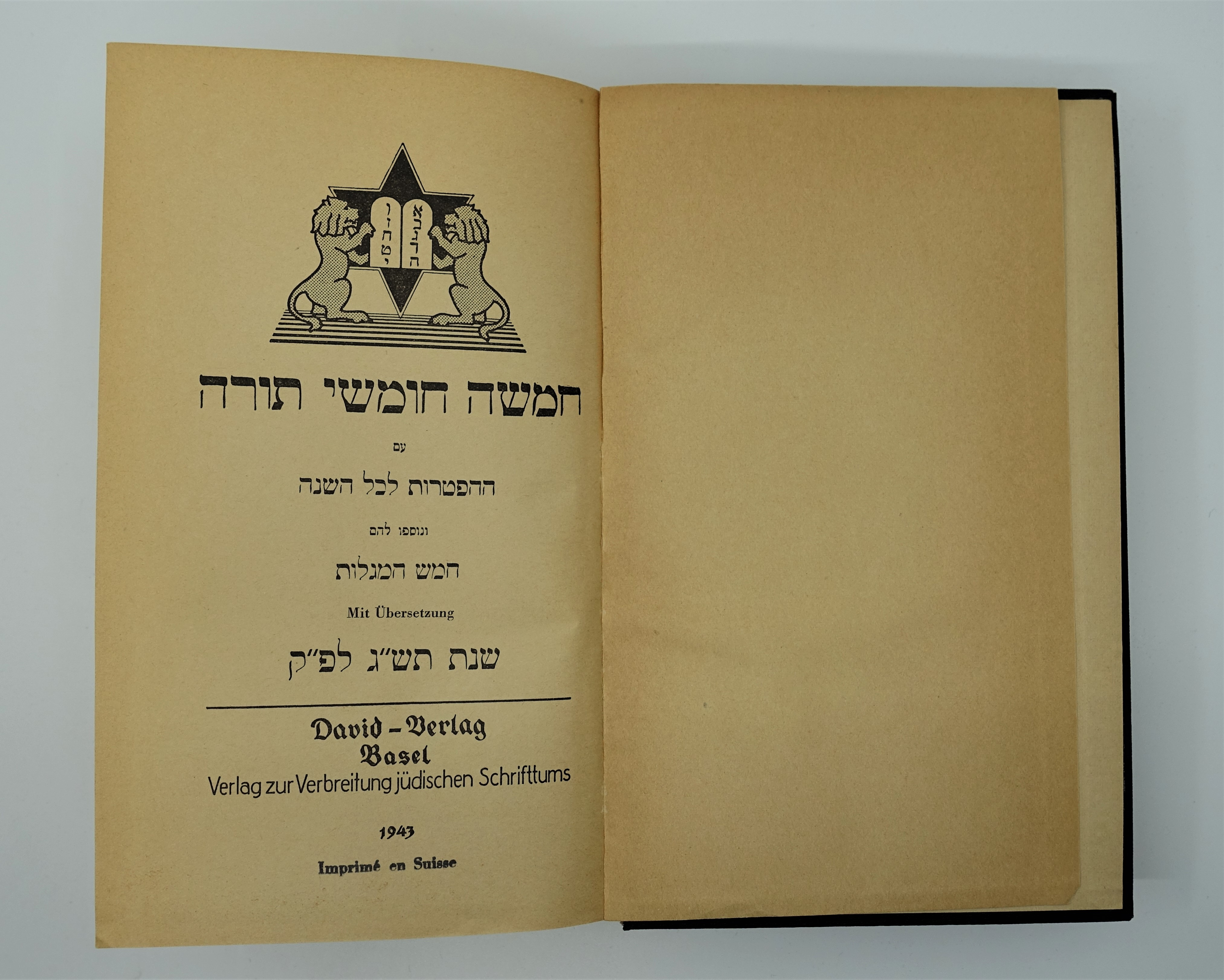
Chumash from Basel, 1943, in the Jewish Museum of Switzerland’s collection.

Chumash (also Ḥumash; Hebrew: חומש, pronounced [χuˈmaʃ] or pronounced [ħuˈmaʃ] or Yiddish: pronounced [ˈχʊməʃ]; plural Ḥumashim) is a copy of the Torah (the Five Books of Moses that begin the Hebrew bible), printed and bound in the form of a book (i.e. a codex) for convenience when studying. In comparison, a Torah scroll is handwritten, with rigorous production standards, on a special type of parchment and sewn together as a single scroll for use in the synagogue.

The word 'Chumash' comes from the Hebrew word for five, ḥamesh (חמש). A more formal term is Ḥamishah Ḥumshei Torah, "five fifths of Torah". It is also known by the Latinised Greek term Pentateuch in common printed editions.

== Etymology ==
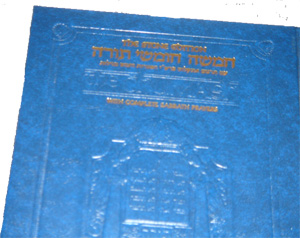
The Artscroll Chumash

The word ḥumesh has the standard Ashkenazi Hebrew vowel shift of ḥomesh, meaning "one-fifth", alluding to any one of the five books; by synecdoche, it came to mean the five fifths of the Torah. The Modern Hebrew pronunciation ḥumash is an erroneous reconstruction based on the assumption that the Ashkenazic accent, which is almost uniformly penultimately stressed, had also changed the stress of the word. ḥumesh preserves the original stress pattern and both pronunciations contain a shifted first vowel.

In early scribal practice, there was a distinction between a Torah scroll containing the entire Pentateuch on a parchment scroll, and a copy of one of the five books on its own, which was generally bound in codex form, like a modern book, and had a lesser degree of sanctity. The term ḥomesh strictly applies to one of the latter. Thus, ḥomesh B'reshit strictly means "the Genesis fifth", but was misread as ḥumash, B'reshit and interpreted as meaning "The Pentateuch: Genesis", as if ḥumash was the name of the book and Bereshit the name of one of its parts. Compare the misunderstanding of "Tur" to mean the entirety of the Arba'ah Turim.

In the legal codes, such as Maimonides' Mishneh Torah, it is laid down that any copy of the Pentateuch which does not comply with the strict rules for a Sefer Torah, for example, because it is not a parchment scroll or contains vowel signs, has only the same sanctity as a copy of an individual book (ḥomesh). In this way, the word ḥomesh (or ḥumash) came to have the extended sense of any copy of the Pentateuch other than a Sefer Torah.

== Usage ==
The word ḥumash generally only refers to "book" bound editions of the Pentateuch, whereas the "scroll" form is called a sefer Torah ("book [of the] Torah").

In modern Jewish practice:

- A printed ḥumash usually sets out the Hebrew text of the Torah with niqqud (vowel marks) and cantillation marks (trop), separated into its 54 constituent weekly Torah portions (parashiyyot), together with the haftarah for each portion and, often, translations and notes.
- A ḥumash-Rashi also contains the Targum Onkelos and the commentary of Rashi, and may or may not have a vernacular translation of the text.
- A Tikkun soferim or Tiqqun Qore'im sets out, in parallel columns, the unvocalized text of the Pentateuch as it would appear in a Torah scroll and the normal printed text as it appears in a Chumash; it sometimes includes haftarot and the Five Megillot. It exists as an aid for soferim (Torah scribes) and for those preparing to read from the sefer Torah in the synagogue.
- A multi-volume set in Hebrew only, often but not always including the entire Tanakh with masoretic notes (sometimes), Targumim and several classical commentaries, is referred to as Mikraot Gedolot ("Great Scriptures").

== Various publications ==
- The Pentateuch and Haftorahs, London 1937, known as the "Hertz Chumash", containing the commentary of former British Chief Rabbi Joseph Hertz
- Soncino Chumash, (1st of the 14 volume Soncino Books of the Bible series) ed. Abraham Cohen, containing notes summarizing the traditional commentaries (Mikraot Gedolot).
- Torah and Haftarot, translation by Philip Birnbaum (Hebrew Publishing Company, 1983. ISBN 0-88484-456-0)
- Etz Hayim Humash (Published by the Jewish Publication Society of America ISBN 0-8276-0712-1): associated with Conservative movement
- Gutnik Chumash with Onkelos, Rashi and commentaries of the Lubavitcher Rebbe
- The Torah: A Modern Commentary, Revised Edition. W. Gunther Plaut, ed. New York: Union for Reform Judaism, 2006: associated with American Reform movement
- The Torah: A Women's Commentary, edited by Tamara Cohn Eskenazi and Andrea L. Weiss, Union for Reform Judaism/Women of Reform Judaism, 2008
