= Harold C. Washington =

American professor

Harold C. Washington is the professor of Hebrew Bible at Saint Paul School of Theology in Kansas City, Missouri. He holds both M.Div. and Ph.D. degrees from Princeton Theological Seminary. He is a member of the Religious Society of Friends (Quakers). He wrote the introduction and annotations for the books of Proverbs and Sirach in the third edition of The New Oxford Annotated Bible NRSV.

== Biography ==
Washington's primary academic interests are: the Hebrew Bible and wisdom literature, Gender Critical Studies, and biblical interpretation.

== Works ==
=== Chapters ===
He has contributed chapters to the following books:

- “Signifying on Exodus: Reading Race and Culture in Zora Neale Hurston’s Moses: Man of the Mountain,” in A Feminist Companion to Exodus to Deuteronomy, Athalya Brenner, ed., The Feminist Companion to the Bible, 6 (Sheffield, UK: Sheffield Academic Press, 2000), 41-58.
- “‘Lest He Die in the Battle and Another Man Take Her’: Violence and the Construction of Gender in the Laws of Deuteronomy 20-22,” in Gender and Law in the Hebrew Bible and the Ancient Near East, Victor H. Matthews, Bernard M. Levinson and Tikva Frymer-Kensky, eds., JSOT Supplement Series, 262 (Sheffield, UK: Sheffield Academic Press, 1998), 185-213.
- “Rape as a Military Metaphor in the Hebrew Bible,” co-authored with Pamela Gordon, in A Feminist Companion to the Latter Prophets; Athalya Brenner, ed., The Feminist Companion to the Bible, 8 (Sheffield, UK: Sheffield Academic Press, 1995), 308-325.
- “‘And Your Daughters Shall Prophesy’: Gender and Culture in Early Quaker Biblical Interpretation,” in Text and Experience: Towards a Cultural Exegesis of the Bible, Daniel Smith-Christopher, ed., The Biblical Seminar, 35 (Sheffield, UK: Sheffield Academic Press, 1995), 23-42.
- “The ‘Strange Woman’ of Proverbs 1-9 and Post-Exilic Judean Society,” in Second Temple Studies 2: Temple and Community in the Persian Period, Tamara C. Eskenazi and Kent H. Richards, eds., JSOT Supplement Series, 175 (Sheffield, UK: JSOT Press, 1994), 217-42; reprinted in A Feminist Companion to Wisdom Literature, Athalya Brenner, ed., The Feminist Companion to the Bible, 9 (Sheffield, UK: Sheffield Academic Press, 1995), 157-84.

=== Books ===
- Escaping Eden: New Feminist Perspectives on the Bible, co-edited with Susan Lochrie Grahm and Pamela Thimmes (Sheffield Academic Press and New York University Press, 1998/1999).
- Wealth and Poverty in The Instruction of Amenemope and the Hebrew Proverbs (Atlanta, GA: Scholars Press, 1994).
