= Cornerstone Speech =

1861 speech by Alexander H. Stephens

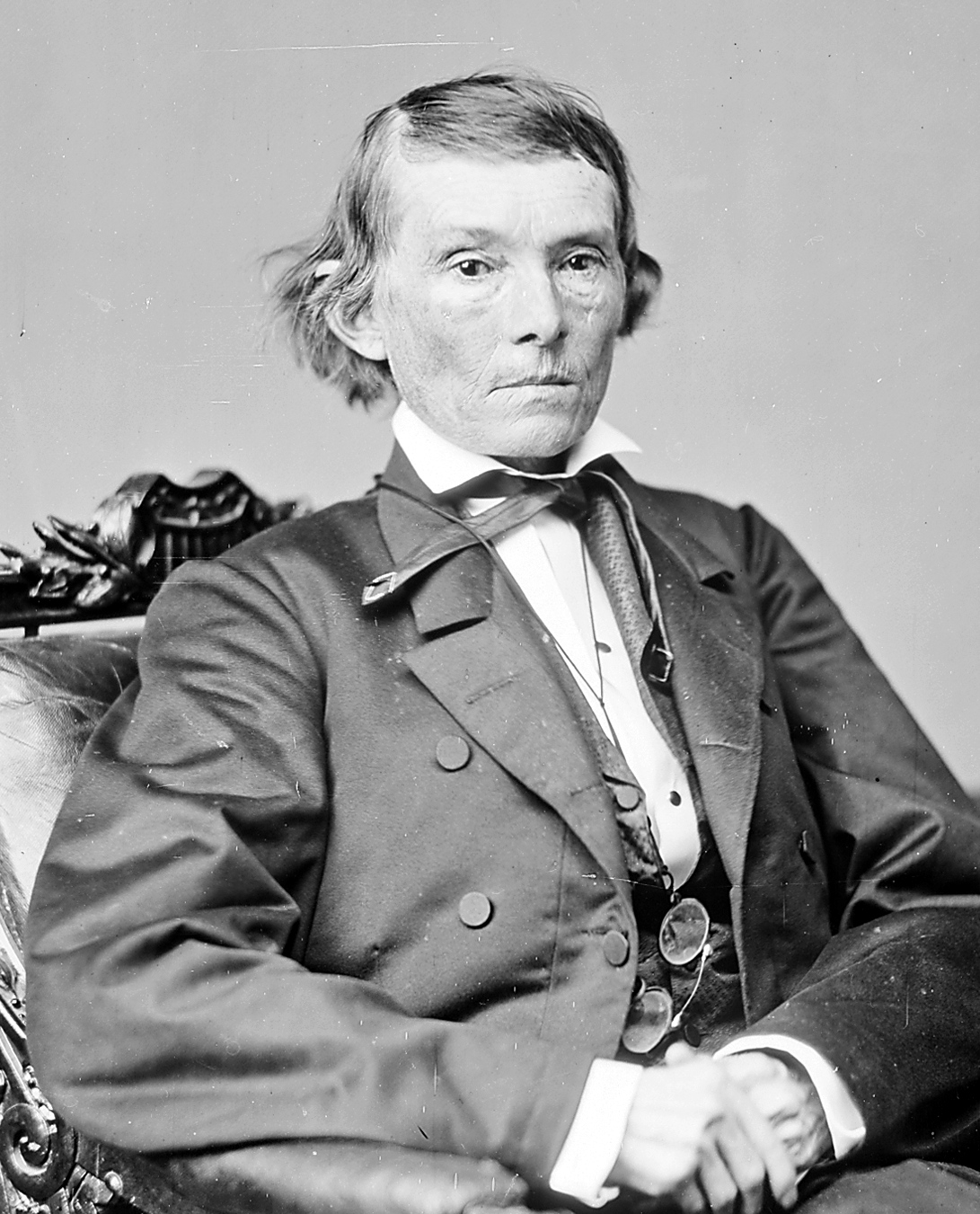
- Alexander H. Stephens, the deliverer of the speech
- Date: March 21, 1861; 165 years ago
- Location: The Athenaeum, Savannah, Georgia
- Participants: Alexander H. Stephens

The Cornerstone Speech, also known as the Cornerstone Address, was an oration given by Alexander H. Stephens, acting Vice President of the Confederate States of America, at the Athenaeum in Savannah, Georgia, on March 21, 1861.

The improvised speech, delivered a few weeks before the Civil War began, defended slavery as a necessary and just result of the supposed inferiority of the black race, explained the fundamental differences between the constitutions of the Confederate States and that of the United States, enumerated contrasts between Union and Confederate ideologies, and laid out the Confederacy's rationale for seceding.

== Title ==
The Cornerstone Speech is so called because Stephens used the word "cornerstone" to describe the "great truth" of white supremacy and black subordination upon which secession and the Confederacy were based, in contrast to the U.S. Declaration of Independence's "all men are created equal":

Our new government is founded upon exactly the opposite idea; its foundations are laid, its corner-stone rests, upon the great truth that the negro is not equal to the white man; that slavery subordination to the superior race is his natural and normal condition. This, our new government, is the first, in the history of the world, based upon this great physical, philosophical, and moral truth.

Later in the speech, Stephens used biblical imagery (Psalm 118, v.22) in arguing that divine laws consigned black Americans to slavery as the "substratum of our society":

Our confederacy is founded upon principles in strict conformity with these laws. This stone which was rejected by the first builders 'is become the chief of the corner'—the real 'corner-stone'—in our new edifice.

== Content ==
=== Background ===
The speech was given weeks after the secession of South Carolina, Mississippi, Florida, Alabama, Georgia, Louisiana and then Texas and less than three weeks after the inauguration of Abraham Lincoln as the 16th President of the United States. The war itself would not begin until the U.S. base of Fort Sumter was attacked by the Confederates in mid-April, so open, large-scale hostilities between the two sides had not yet begun. However, there had been isolated incidents, such as the attack on the U.S. steamship Star of the West, carrying supplies for Fort Sumter. Referring to the general lack of violence, Stephens stated that the secession had to that point been accomplished without "the loss of a single drop of blood".

=== Cornerstone ===
Stephens' speech criticized the Founding Fathers, and Thomas Jefferson in particular, for their anti-slavery and Enlightenment views, accusing them of erroneously assuming that races are equal. He declared that disagreements over the enslavement of black Americans were the "immediate cause" of secession and that the Confederate constitution had resolved such issues, saying:

The new Constitution has put at rest forever all the agitating questions relating to our peculiar institution—African slavery as it exists among us—the proper status of the negro in our form of civilization. This was the immediate cause of the late rupture and present revolution. Jefferson, in his forecast, had anticipated this, as the "rock upon which the old Union would split." He was right. What was conjecture with him, is now a realized fact. But whether he fully comprehended the great truth upon which that rock stood and stands, may be doubted. The prevailing ideas entertained by him and most of the leading statesmen at the time of the formation of the old Constitution were, that the enslavement of the African was in violation of the laws of nature; that it was wrong in principle, socially, morally and politically. It was an evil they knew not well how to deal with; but the general opinion of the men of that day was, that, somehow or other, in the order of Providence, the institution would be evanescent and pass away. [...] Those ideas, however, were fundamentally wrong. They rested upon the assumption of the equality of races. This was an error. It was a sandy foundation, and the idea of a Government built upon it—when the "storm came and the wind blew, it fell."

Stephens contended that advances and progress in the sciences proved that the United States Declaration of Independence's view that "all men are created equal" was erroneous and that all men were not created equal. He stated that advances in science proved that enslavement of black Americans by white men was justified and that it coincided with the Bible's teachings. He also stated that the Confederacy was the first country in the world founded on the principle of white supremacy:

Our new government is founded upon exactly the opposite ideas; its foundations are laid, its cornerstone rests, upon the great truth that the negro is not equal to the white man; that slavery, subordination to the superior race, is his natural and normal condition. This, our new government, is the first, in the history of the world, based upon this great physical, philosophical, and moral truth. This truth has been slow in the process of its development, like all other truths in the various departments of science.

Stephens stated that the Confederacy's belief in human inequality was adhering to the "laws of nature":

May we not therefore look with confidence to the ultimate universal acknowledgement of the truths upon which our system rests? It is the first government ever instituted upon the principles in strict conformity to nature, and the ordination of Providence, in furnishing the materials of human society. Many governments have been founded upon the principle of the subordination and serfdom of certain classes of the same race; such were and are in violation of the laws of nature. Our system commits no such violation of nature's laws.

The phrases "laws of nature" and "all men are created equal" from the U.S. Declaration of Independence had formed part of the basis of Lincoln's assertion that he was defending the principles of the Founding Fathers by being opposed to slavery. Democrats such as John C. Calhoun and Stephen A. Douglas had differing views on what the latter phrase meant. Calhoun had contended that the idea was peculiar to Thomas Jefferson and not a universal principle, whereas Douglas maintained that it referred to white men only. In this context, Stephens' assertion has been read as validating Lincoln's interpretation of the U.S. Founding Fathers' principles, but countering with an assertion of "racial inequality".

After the Confederacy's defeat at the hands of the U.S. in the Civil War and the abolition of slavery, Stephens attempted to retroactively deny and retract the opinions he had stated in the speech. Denying his earlier statements that slavery was the Confederacy's cause for leaving the Union, he contended to the contrary that he thought that the war was rooted in constitutional differences as detailed below.

=== Constitutional differences ===
==== Economic ====
In the speech, Stephens mostly outlined how the Confederate constitution eliminated the tariff and prohibited the central government from spending on internal improvements. The reasoning was on a states' rights argument, with the Georgia Railroad as a first example:

The cost of the grading, the superstructure, and the equipment of our roads was borne by those who had entered into the enterprise. Nay, more not only the cost of the iron—no small item in the aggregate cost—was borne in the same way, but we were compelled to pay into the common treasury several millions of dollars for the privilege of importing the iron, after the price was paid for it abroad. What justice was there in taking this money, which our people paid into the common treasury on the importation of our iron, and applying it to the improvement of rivers and harbors elsewhere?

[...]

If Charleston Harbor needs improvement, let the commerce of Charleston bear the burden. If the mouth of the Savannah river has to be cleared out, let the sea-going navigation which is benefited by it, bear the burden.

Stephens noted that the new country would have a clear delineation between federal and state responsibilities and took the position similar to that of South Carolina during the nullification crisis, namely that the federal government should not pay for internal improvements.

==== Procedural ====
The first change was apparently very important to Stephens and he would have made the constitution even closer to that of the United Kingdom's, but he felt it was still an improvement over the U.S. Constitution, saying that "cabinet ministers and heads of departments may have the privilege of seats upon the floor of the Senate and House of Representatives and may have the right to participate in the debates and discussions upon the various subjects of administration".

As an example, in the U.S. Constitution the U.S. Secretary of the Treasury had no chance to explain his budget or to be held accountable except by the press.

The President was to serve a single six-year term in the hope that it would "remove from the incumbent all temptation to use his office or exert the powers confided to him for any objects of personal ambition".

=== Status ===
The seven states that seceded, Stephens thought, were sufficient to form a successful republic, with a population of five million (including blacks) and a land area larger than that of France, Spain, Portugal, and the United Kingdom combined. The seven states contained taxable property of $2,200,000,000 and debts of only $18,000,000 whereas the remaining United States had a debt of $174,000,000.

=== Future ===
The Confederate constitution allowed new states to join easily. Stephens said that surely North Carolina, Tennessee, and Arkansas would be members in the near future and that Virginia, Kentucky, and Missouri would eventually join.

Stephens expected the swift evacuation of Fort Sumter, a U.S. Army stronghold in South Carolina, but what "course will be pursued toward Fort Pickens, and the other [U.S.] forts on the gulf, is not so well understood". Since the Confederacy up to that point had been born bloodless, Stephens stated that he had wanted that to continue and to make peace "not only with the North, but with the world". Even so, he surmised that the U.S. would not follow a peaceful course and accused the Republicans of being hypocritical in being opposed to slavery but at the same time refusing to acquiesce slave states seceding from the U.S.:

The principles and position of the present Administration of the United States—the Republican Party—present some puzzling questions. While it is a fixed principle with them, never to allow the increase of a foot of Slave Territory, they seem to be equally determined not to part with an inch "of the accursed soil." Notwithstanding their clamor against the institution, they seemed to be equally opposed to getting more, or letting go what they have got. They were ready to fight on the accession of Texas, and are equally ready to fight now on her secession. Why is this? How can this strange paradox be accounted for? There seems to be but one rational solution—and that is, notwithstanding their professions of humanity, they are disinclined to give up the benefits they derive from slave labor. Their philanthropy yields to their interest. The idea of enforcing the laws, has but one object, and that is a collection of the taxes, raised by slave labor to swell the fund necessary to meet their heavy appropriations. The spoils is what they are after—though they come from the labor of the slave.

Finally, Stephens predicted that the nascent Confederate regime would succeed or fail based on the character of its constituent body politic.

== Legacy ==
=== Wartime ===
When war broke out and the Confederacy refused to release captured Black U.S. soldiers in exchange for imprisoned Confederates in U.S. custody, Union official Benjamin Butler alluded to all this, telling the Confederates that "your fabric of opposition to the Government of the United States has the right of property in man as its corner-stone". Abolitionist Frederick Douglass alluded to the speech in an 1863 speech in Pennsylvania encouraging Black men to fight for the U.S. cause: "Stephens has stated, with the utmost clearness and precision, the difference between the fundamental ideas of the Confederate Government and those of the Federal Government. One is based on the idea that colored men are an inferior race who may be enslaved and plundered forever and to the hearts' content of any men of different complexion..."

=== Postwar ===
Immediately after the end of the Civil War, former Confederate leaders including Stephens began downplaying the role of slavery in the decision to secede and constructing the Lost Cause of the Confederacy. During the war, Stephens had not wavered from the view of slavery expressed in the Cornerstone Speech -- indeed, he had remained a diehard supporter of slavery even during surrender negotiations in 1865 -- and had never questioned the accuracy of reports of the speech, but during his imprisonment after surrender, he suddenly began claiming that the Cornerstone Speech was actually about racial uplift and had been misreported in the press. Despite claiming that the press record of the speech was inaccurate, Stephens had it reprinted in full in his authorized biography. Other than Stephens's own works, most early publications on the Lost Cause chose to ignore the speech entirely, and it was not mentioned in Southern obituaries of Stephens.

=== Historical perspectives ===
Historian Harry V. Jaffa discusses the speech at length in his 2000 book A New Birth of Freedom. He concludes that "this remarkable address conveys, more than any other contemporary document, not only the soul of the Confederacy but also of that Jim Crow South that arose from the ashes of the Confederacy". Jaffa compared the racism of Stephens and the Confederacy to that of Adolf Hitler and Nazi Germany:

Stephens's prophecy of the Confederacy's future resembles nothing so much as Hitler's prophecies of the Thousand-Year Reich. Nor are their theories very different.

The speech was given extemporaneously. After the war, Stephens attempted to downplay the importance of slavery as the cause of Confederacy's secession. In an 1865 diary entry written while imprisoned, he accused reporters of having misquoted him, and claimed that constitutional issues were more important. Stephens contended that the notes of the reporter who recorded the speech were "very imperfect" and "hastily corrected" by himself, and that his speech was published "without further revision and with several glaring errors". He further expounded on this allegation in his 1868 book A Constitutional View of the Late War between the States. According to one scholar, the "misquotations" alleged by Stephens after the war are so numerous as to be highly unlikely.

There is a theory that Jefferson Davis, the leader of the Confederacy, was outraged by Stephens's admission that slavery was the reason behind the slave states' secession, for Davis himself was attempting to garner foreign support for the nascent regime from countries that were not very accepting of slavery. However, there is no evidence that this actually happened. Stephens, Davis, and Davis's wife Varina did not discuss any such disagreement in their respective autobiographies, nor did Stephens's official biographers. The first mention of Davis's supposed reaction was in a 1959 biography of Davis by Hudson Strode, who appears to have presented his own conjecture as fact.

== See also ==
- Mudsill theory
- South Carolina Declaration of Secession
