= Debt dependence =

Debt dependence or debt dependency may refer to:

- Debt-trap diplomacy, a country's loss of autonomy due to imposed debt
- Debt bondage, the nonindependence or slavery of a person due to debt
- Debt slavery and the bible, historical and theological approach to debt slavery
