= The Savannah Theatre =

Theatre in Savannah, Georgia, U.S.

- Athenaeum
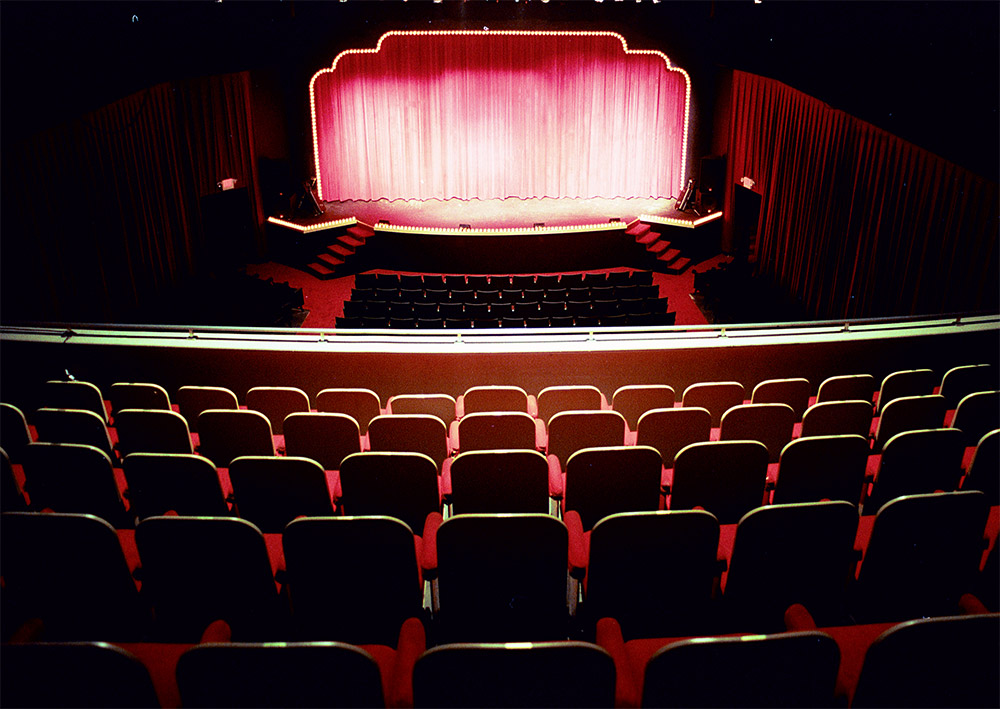
- Interactive map of The Savannah Theatre
- Address: 222 Bull Street; Savannah, Georgia; United States
- Coordinates: 32°4′32.7″N 81°5′32.1″W
- Capacity: 525

Construction
- Opened: December 1818
- Years active: 201
- Architect: William Jay

Website
- www.savannahtheatre.com

The Savannah Theatre, first opened in 1818 and located on Bull Street, at Chippewa Square, in Savannah, Georgia, is one of the United States' oldest continually operating theatres. The structure has been both a live performance venue and a movie theater. Since 2002, the theatre has hosted regular performances of a variety of shows, primarily music revues.

== History ==
The Savannah Theatre opened its doors at 5:30pm on December 4, 1818, with a performance of "The Soldier's Daughter". The original structure was designed by British architect William Jay, whose other notable works include the Telfair Mansion and the Owens-Thomas House, both located in Savannah. During the 1850s and 1860s, it was sometimes known as the Athenaeum. On March 21, 1861, Alexander H. Stephens delivered the Cornerstone Speech at the theatre.

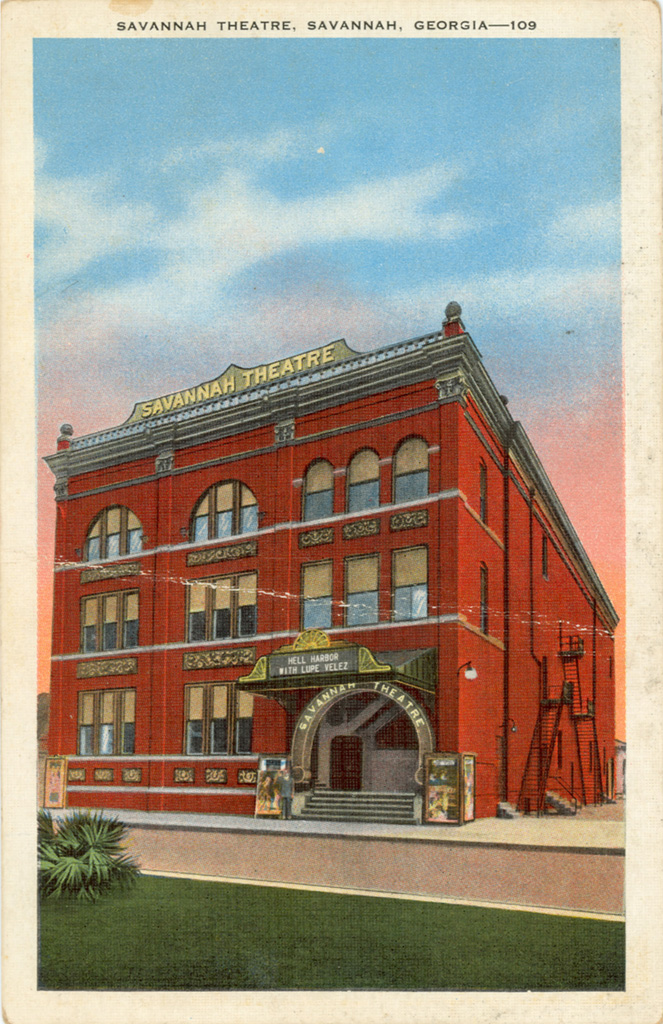
The image here is the 1906 remodel which resulted in a new brick facade, with cast terra cotta panels. Many of the windows were filled in

The original structure suffered severe damage due to a hurricane that hit Savannah on August 31, 1898, tearing sections of the roof off the building and flooding the auditorium. Additionally, the Theatre has undergone two notable structural overhauls as the result of fires in 1906 and 1948. Following the 1948 fire, the building was transformed to its current Art Deco style.

== Military use ==
In 1832, the Savannah Theatre served a temporary military function when troops from Cantonment Oglethorpe relocated to the building during the sickly season. On May 17, 1832, Company E of the Second Regiment of Artillery moved from the cantonment into the city, with enlisted men billeted in the Savannah Theatre while officers stayed in nearby homes. The City Council allowed the soldiers to temporarily fence the space between the Theatre and the nearby open grounds of the Chatham Academy. This relocation strategy proved effective in reducing mortality from bilious malignant fever (likely malaria) that had devastated the cantonment, with only 3 to 7 troops recorded sick and one death during the first year of this approach, compared to the cantonment's devastating losses of over 100 soldiers, women, and children between 1826 and 1828. Troops returned to the cantonment each November during the healthier months until the construction of permanent barracks within the city was completed in 1835.

== Notable players ==
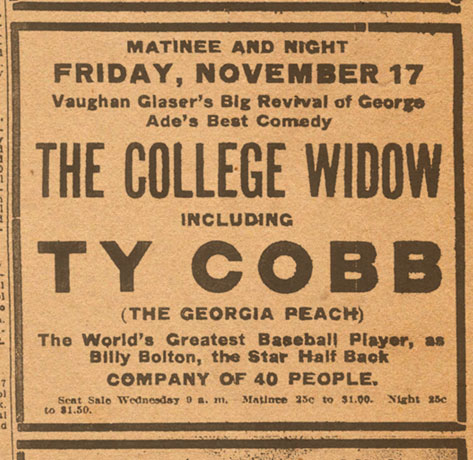
Advertisement for The College Widow featuring Ty Cobb from The Savannah Press, 1911

Over the past two centuries, the Savannah Theatre has showcased an array of talented performers, including Fanny Davenport, E. H. Sothern, Julia Marlowe, Otis Skinner, Oscar Wilde Sarah Bernhardt, W. C. Fields, Tyrone Power, and Lillian Russell. Edwin Booth played several engagements at the Theatre in February 1876, with Shakespearean roles including Hamlet, Iago, and King Lear. It is unknown as to whether or not Edwin's younger brother John Wilkes Booth ever performed at the Savannah Theatre.

In 1851, the New York Dramatic Company leased the Theatre briefly. Among the players was Joseph Jefferson, whose most well-known role was that of Washington Irving's "Rip Van Winkle". However the company's stand failed to succeed, as their "lineup of standard hits failed to tempt Savannah audiences."

In November 1911, baseball player Ty Cobb appeared in The College Widow at the theatre.

== The theatre today ==
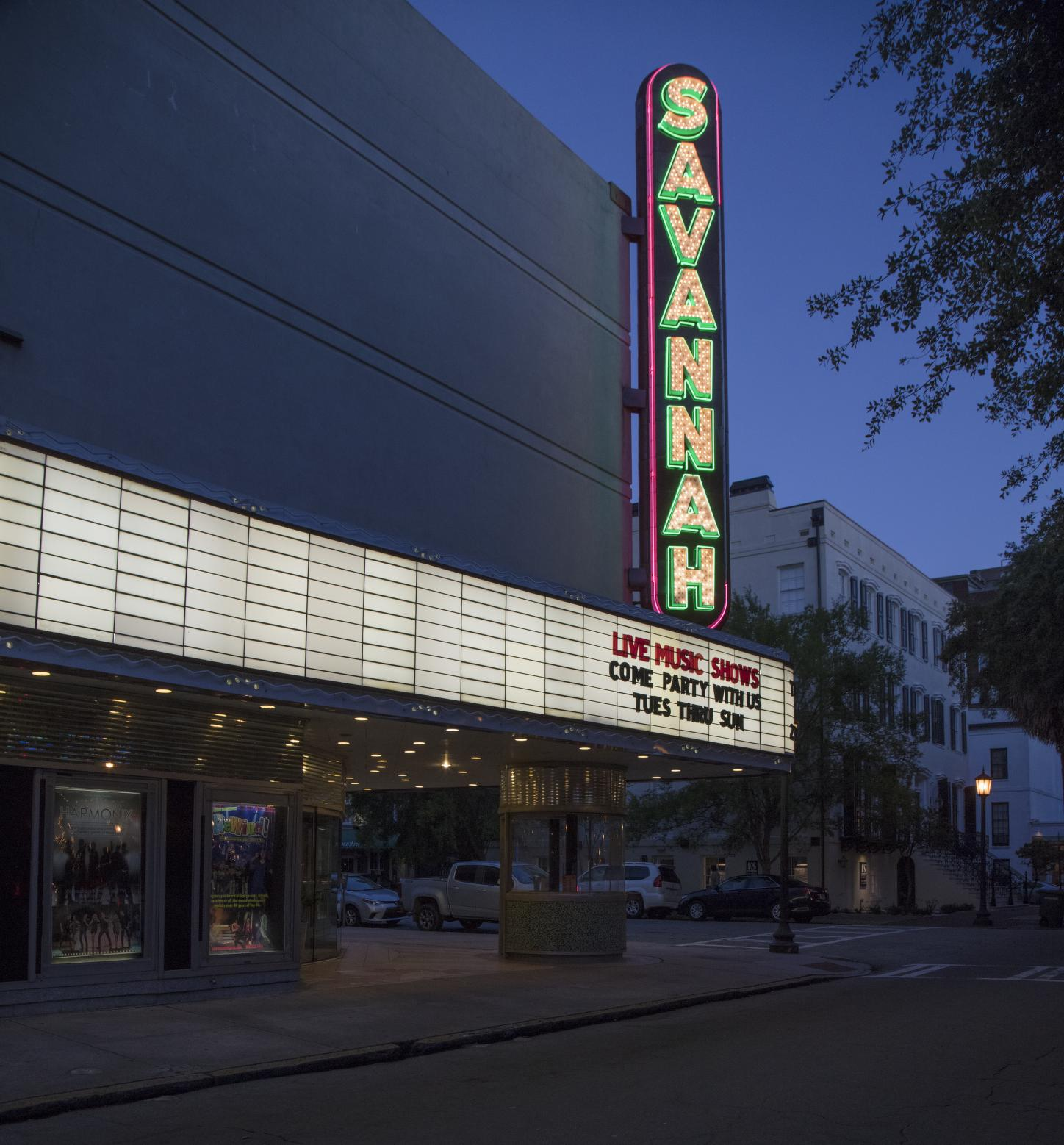
Savannah Theatre in 2017

Beginning in 2002 with the music revue "Lost in the '50s", the theatre has housed live performances of several productions.

== Bibliography ==
- "An Address by Alexander R. Lawton: Delivered in the City Hall, Savannah, Georgia April 21, 1919". The Georgia Historical Quarterly. 3 (2): 45–60. June 1919. JSTOR 40575607.
