= Cantonment Oglethorpe =

19th Century US Base

- Old Oglethorpe Barracks
- Corner of West Park Avenue and Whitaker Street; Chatham County, Georgia
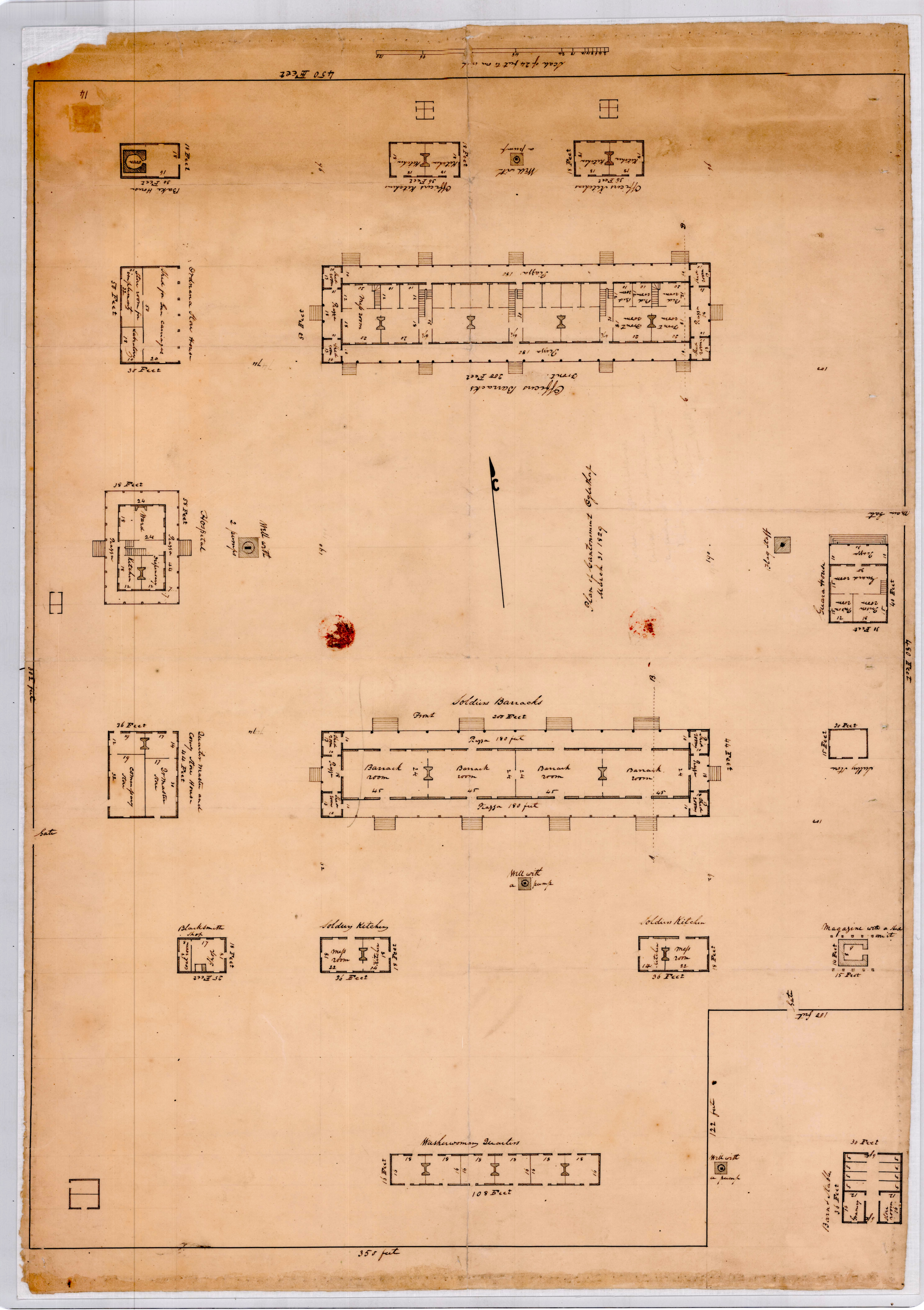
- Plan of the cantonment

Site information
- Type: Cantonment
- Owner: United States Army
- Controlled by: United States Army

Location
- Coordinates: 32.065769°N 81.098773°W
- Area: 6.22 acres of 28+ acres

Site history
- Built: 1826
- Built by: United States Army
- In use: 1826–1835
- Materials: Wood

Garrison information
- Past commanders: Brevet Colonel William McRae
- Garrison: 2nd Regiment of Artillery (United States)
- Occupants: Companies I & E, 2nd Regiment of Artillery (1828)

Cantonment Oglethorpe was a United States Army artillery installation that operated near Savannah, Georgia, from 1826 to 1835. Established on approximately 28 acres of land about a half mile south of Savannah's then city limits, the cantonment housed up to two companies of the Fourth and Second Regiments of Artillery under the Eastern Department of War. The installation became notable for its high mortality rate, with over 100 soldiers, women, and children dying from bilious malignant fever, likely malaria, between 1826 and 1828. Following years of seasonal disease outbreaks, military authorities implemented various strategies to reduce mortality, including seasonal relocations and eventually the construction of new barracks within the city. The post was abandoned in 1835 when troops relocated to the newly constructed Oglethorpe Barracks on Liberty Street. The former cantonment site was ceded to the City of Savannah in 1853 and now comprises a portion of the southwest quadrant of Forsyth Park and a western portion of Savannah's Victorian Historic District.

== History ==
=== Establishment ===
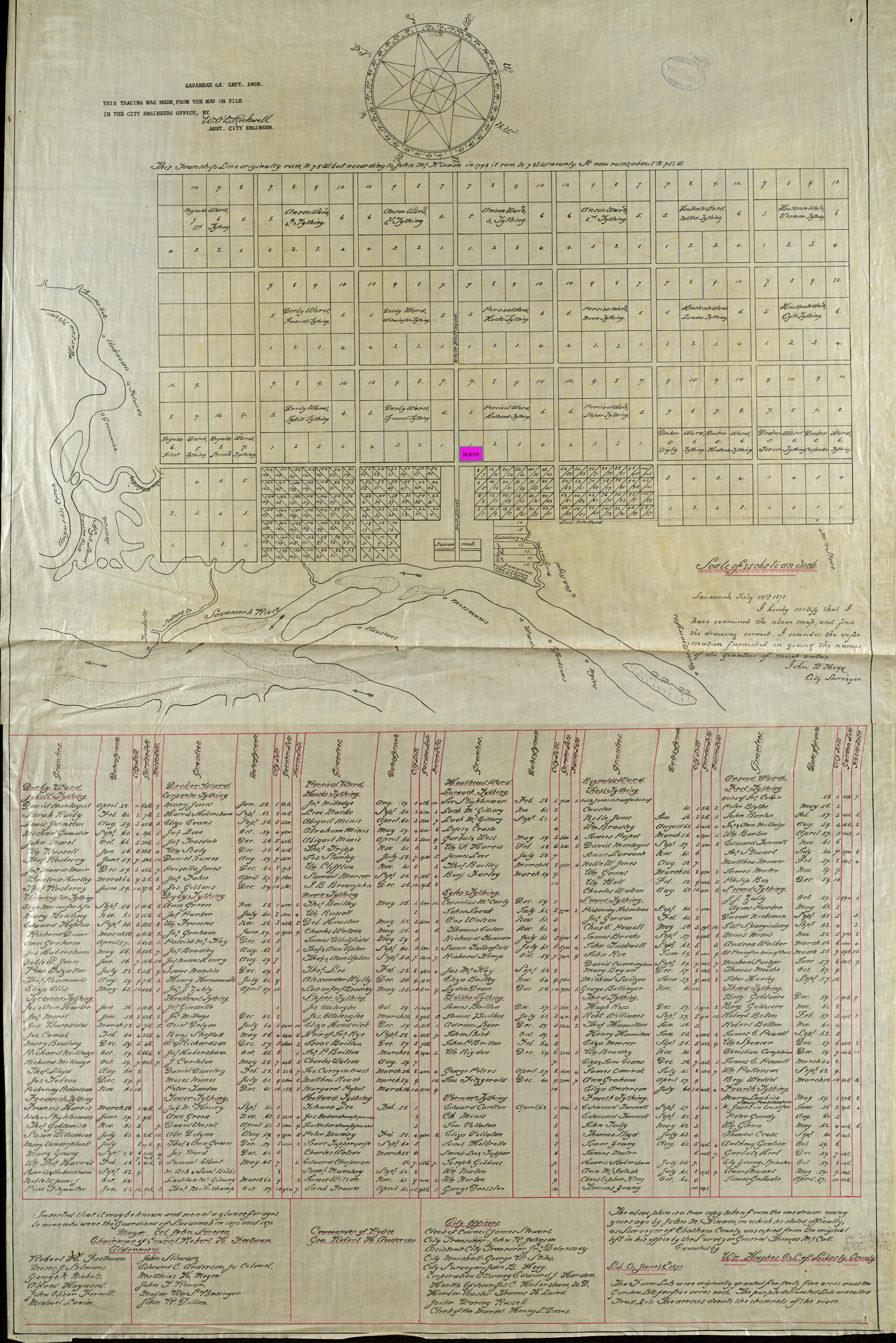
Pink square in Farm Lot 1 is the north 28 acres purchased in 1827 by US Government for Cantonment Oglethorpe. (Base image: 1908 tracing of 1871 tracing of 1798 tracing by John McKinnon of Oglethorpe Plan of Savannah. Note top compass where north arrow is 20º west of city street grid's north.)

Two federal regiments arrived in Savannah in spring 1826 aboard the brig Heroine, which was modified with berths for 75 men and cabins for officers. Construction of Cantonment Oglethorpe began in the months after their arrival. The Mayor and Aldermen of Savannah had requested military presence after all U.S. troops were removed from the city in early 1824.

The soldiers received artillery training at Fortress Monroe before arriving in Savannah to occupy a portion of 28 acres of forested land, located approximately a half mile outside the city's limits.

=== Disease and mortality ===
On February 28, 1829, the Savannah Republican republished an article from the Philadelphia Evening Post in which Savannah residents warned of unhealthy conditions causing a "bilious malignant fever," likely malaria, that had afflicted the recently posted troops. According to the article, approximately one regiment died from summer 1826 through the end of 1827. A regiment arrived in April 1828 to replace the deceased troops, but by the end of 1828, an additional 51 soldiers, 5 women, and 16 children had died from the fever. These deaths are not recorded in the "Index to Register of Deaths in Savannah". Continued research is needed for the burial location of the women, children, and over 100 soldiers.

Monthly Returns from US Military Posts (Monthly Returns) document the severity of the disease outbreak at Cantonment Oglethorpe. Deaths were no longer recorded in Monthly Returns after November 1827. In June 1828, 105 soldiers were listed as 'present' at the cantonment, but by October only 63 soldiers remained. Up to 58% of those present were recorded sick from May to October 1828.

Richard Wayne, M.D., a native of nearby Screven County, received his military commission and served as surgeon at Cantonment Oglethorpe after training at the Medical College in Philadelphia. Wayne later served Savannah as alderman (1828, 1842, 1843), first popularly elected mayor (1844-1845, 1848-1853, 1857-1858), and represented Chatham County in the Georgia legislature. Wayne himself contracted bilious fever in 1840 while treating patients.

=== Seasonal abandonment strategy (1829-1835) ===
In response to the high mortality rate, military authorities implemented a strategy of seasonal abandonment from 1829 to 1835 to prevent deaths from disease during the warmer months of May through November. This pattern of abandonment is documented in the Monthly Returns.

From 1829 to 1831, Company E was sent to Augusta Arsenal (aka Augusta Sand Hills) in Augusta, Georgia during the "sickly season". Company I also remained in Augusta until July 20, 1829, when they were dispatched to their permanent post at Fort Mitchell in Alabama, arriving on August 7, 1829.

A new strategy began on May 17, 1832, when Company E relocated within City of Savannah boundaries during the sickly season. Enlisted men billeted in the Savannah Theatre while officers stayed in nearby homes vacated by owners who traveled to cooler climates. City Council agreed to allow the soldiers to temporarily fence in the space between the Theatre and the nearby open grounds of the Chatham Academy. An otherwise normal number of 3 to 7 troops of Company E were recorded sick and one death occurred during the first year of this approach. Troops returned to Oglethorpe Barracks on November 14. Total troops present only decreased by three from May to November, demonstrating the effectiveness of the urban relocation strategy.

On August 22, 1833, the Savannah Mayor and Aldermen passed an ordinance authorizing the establishment of "New Oglethorpe Barracks". The U.S. Government purchased land on Liberty Street on November 5, 1833, for $12,000, as recorded in Superior Court deed 2S-455. The new barracks site was located at what is today mostly the boundaries of the DeSoto Hotel, between Bull Street and Drayton Street. May 15, 1835, was the last noted entry in Monthly Returns where troops were removed from Cantonment Oglethorpe to the City of Savannah.

=== Slavery and Military Deployment ===
In 1825, Savannah's city population consisted of 2,763 white residents and 3,230 black residents. By 1830, the city's population had grown to 3,620 white residents, 3,279 enslaved persons, and 404 free people of color. In the remainder of Chatham County, the population was 603 white residents, 6,202 enslaved persons, and 22 free people of color.

Slave Laws Passed in Georgia, 1829

The demographics of Savannah and Chatham County were a factor in the federal government's decision to establish Cantonment Oglethorpe. In a report to Congress dated January 25, 1827, Quartermaster General Thomas S. Jesup stated: "The situation of the city of Savannah, in relation to a certain class of its population, rendered it necessary to place two companies in its vicinity, in consequence of which barracks were to be erected. They were commenced early last Summer, and are now in progress."

On December 22, 1829, months after David Walker's Appeal calling for slave resistance began circulating in Southern ports, Georgia enacted comprehensive slave control legislation that directly affected Savannah as a major port city. The laws mandated a 40-day quarantine for ships arriving with free Black sailors, who were to be jailed until departure; prohibited teaching enslaved or free Black persons to read or write, with white violators subject to fines up to $500 and imprisonment and Black violators subject to whipping; and made circulating materials inciting insurrection punishable by death.

=== Response to Nat Turner's Rebellion ===
Following Nat Turner's rebellion in Southampton County, Virginia, which occurred August 21-23, 1831, the Savannah Georgian reported on Virginia's new slave laws in its October 18, 1831 edition. A December 7, 1831 communication in the Savannah Georgian directed towards City Council, signed Virginia, regarded the seasonal absence of the troops and referenced "the events of last summer," stating that the presence of federal troops "would inspire much confidence and might serve to keep some at home who have said, after the events of last summer, nothing but actual necessity should induce them to stay another." In the following weeks, City Council appointed a committee to request the War Department erect new barracks within the healthier, city borders.

== Construction and layout ==
=== Budget and planning ===
Cantonment Oglethorpe Plan (1826-1835). Note elevations of structures.

In January 1827, the Department of War submitted a letter to the Congressional Military Committee requesting an initial budget of $14,452.51 for Cantonment Oglethorpe. The budget itemized picket fencing and most buildings shown in later plans, including a two-story hospital. The washwomen's quarters, magazine, ordnance storehouse, sutler store, wells, and privies were not included in the budget but appear in an 1829 drawing.

Lieutenant John B. Scott advertised in the Savannah Georgian on October 10, 1826, requesting delivery of 192,000 feet of pine lumber in 28-foot lengths, 8 inches thick and at least 12 inches wide. Scott also secured contracts in 1826 for large quantities of oak firewood and fresh beef.

=== Site plans ===
Three plans of Cantonment Oglethorpe are preserved in the National Archives Catalog. The architectural style of the building elevations is akin to the regional Lowcountry style. A plan dated March 31, 1829, includes dimensions of the buildings and perimeter picket fence. A third plan appears to be the initial design based on notations indicating incomplete perimeter fencing and fewer buildings. The key for names of buildings and rooms is found on its reverse side.

1818 Plat of 56 Acre Farm Lot 1, Holland Tything, Perchival Ward. USA Government purchased northern half, 28+ acres denoted in pink. Estimated locations of Whitaker Street in green and 1829 Plan of Cantonment Oglethorpe in orange, for scale.

The March 31, 1829 plan shows the picket fence enclosing the cantonment at right angles. The northern fence extended 450 feet without interruption. The west fence measured 602 feet and included a gate near the quartermaster and commissary stores. The east fence extended 480 feet with the main gate at its midpoint. The south fence featured an irregular configuration to accommodate a barn and stable in the southeast corner.

== Location ==
The cantonment's site plans show a north arrow rotated approximately 20 degrees west of the street grid, consistent with Savannah's Oglethorpe Plan. This alignment suggests the main gate faced towards White Bluff Road, the nearest contemporary road with this orientation. The other nearby road, Ogeechee Road, did not align with the city's street grid.

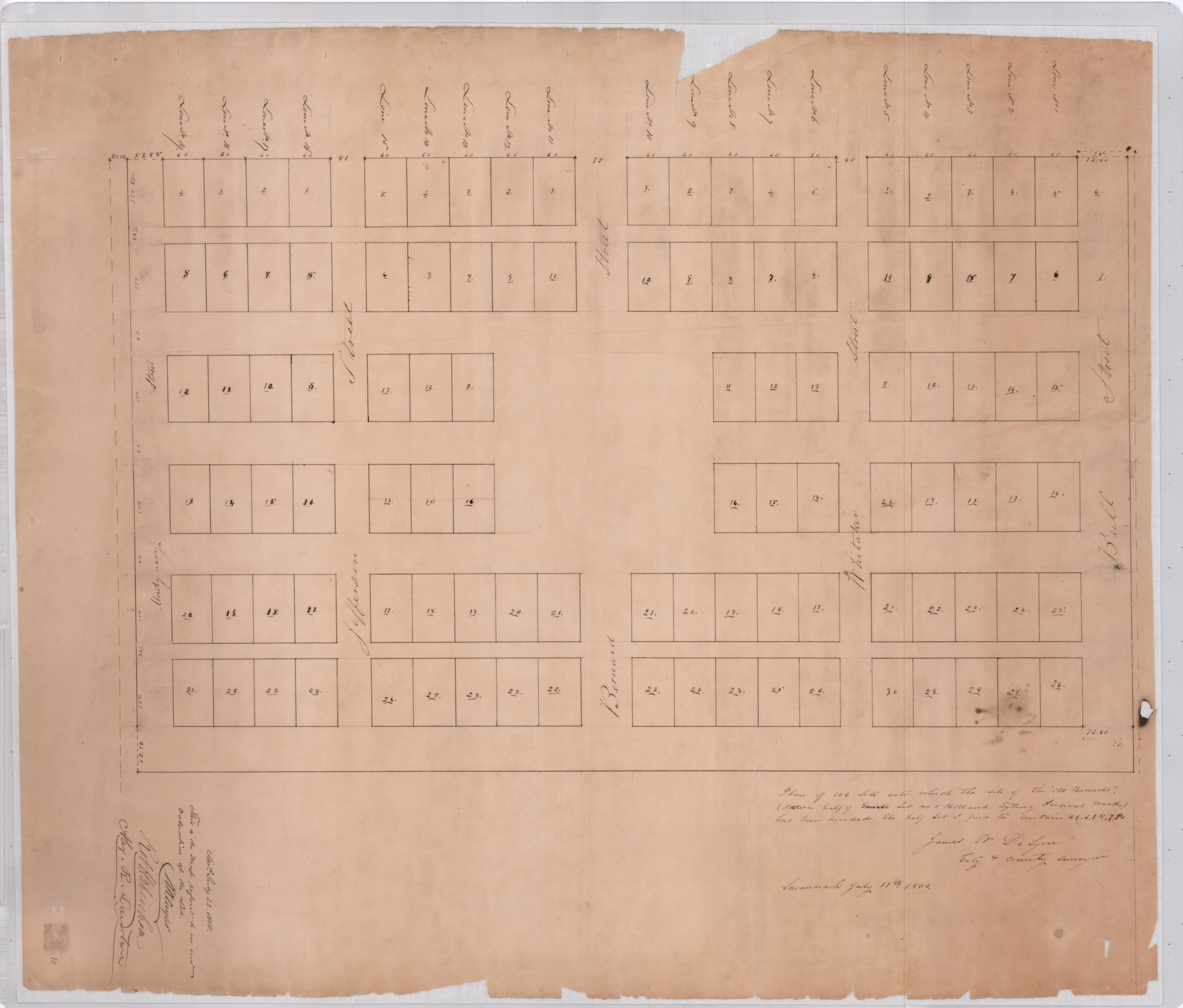
1850 Plan depicts Northern Half of Farm Lot 1, Holland Tything, Percival Ward configured into 106 city lots and a square. Plan drawn three years before US Government ceded land to City of Savannah. Lot lengths and configuration of streets differ from final city plan. (Bull, Whitaker, Barnard and Jefferson were amongst the first north-south streets established by Oglethorpe circa 1733.) See SAGIS based map and Lloyd Ward map below.

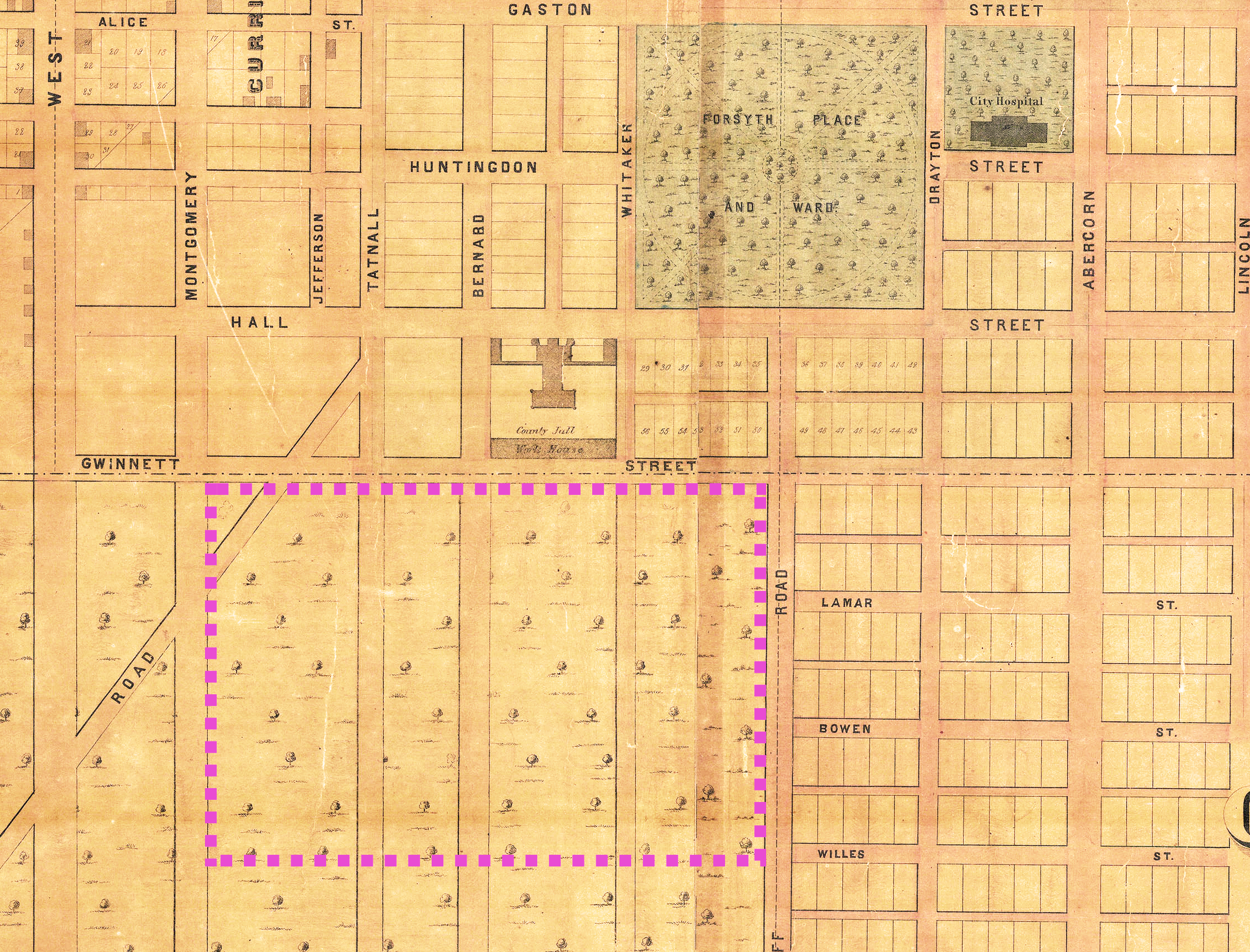
Vincent's 1853 Subdivision Map of Savannah, Georgia, with annotated estimated location of Cantonment Oglethorpe (active 1826-1830s) with pink dash south of county jail. Original map from National Archives. Note size of Forsyth Place and Ward.

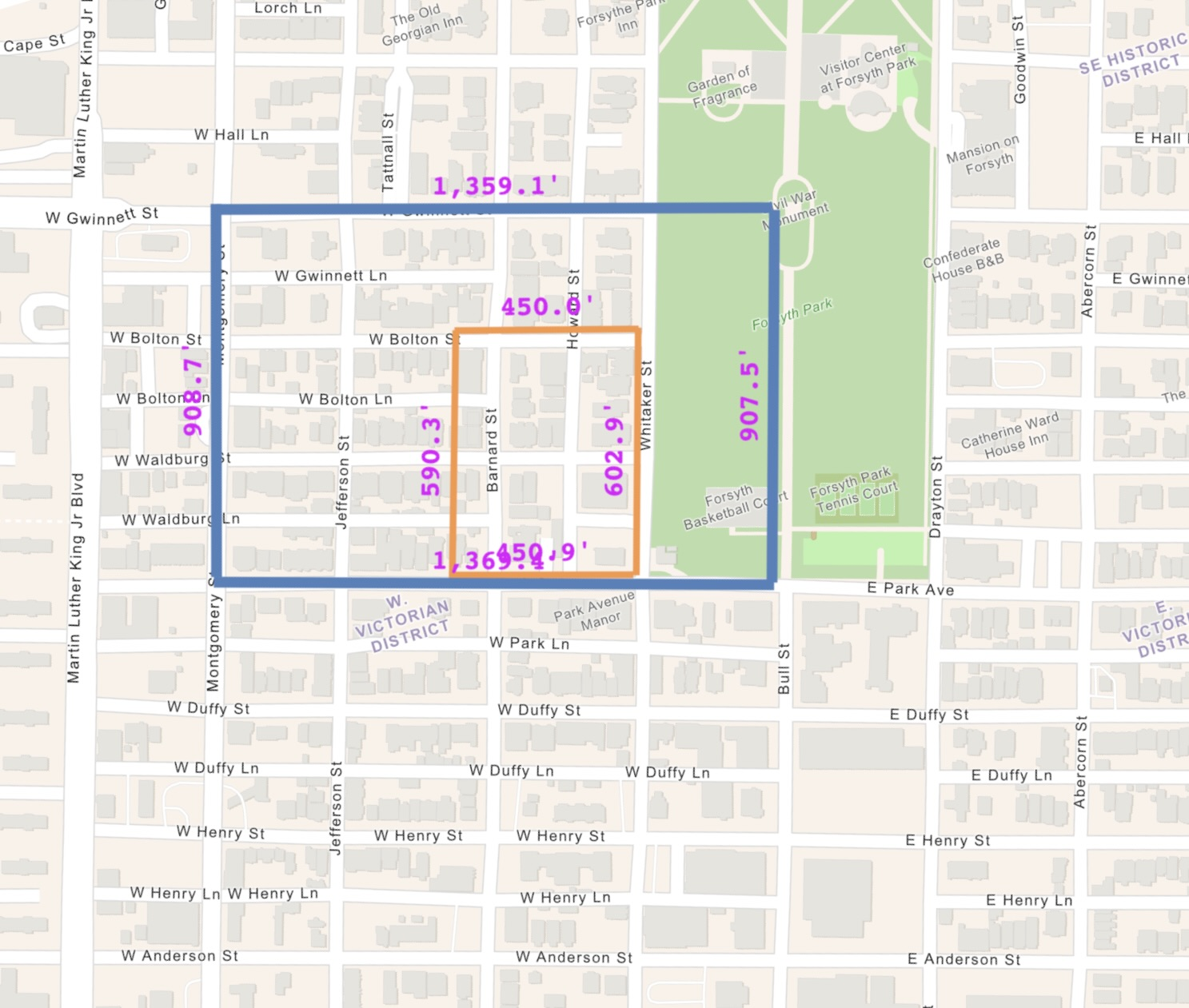
2025 map of Savannah (SAGIS) with applied boundaries of 28-acres and footprint of cantonment at Whitaker Street and Park Avenue. Savannah Area Geographic Information Systems (SAGIS)

Farm Lot 1, Holland Tything, Percival Ward (Farm Lot 1) was surveyed in 1818 measuring 56 acres, 3 rods, and 14 perches total. According to the 1818 plat, this rectangular lot measured 20.60 chains (approximately 1,360 feet) in width and 27.5 chains (approximately 1,815 feet) in length. On April 3, 1827, the United States purchased the northern half of Farm Lot 1, (approximately 28 acres) for $800 (Deed 2O-187). A survey from July 15, 1850 represents the boundaries as Montgomery Street on the west, Gwinnett Street on the north, the central promenade of Forsyth Park (then White Bluff Road) on the east, and Park Avenue on the south.

At the time of purchase, the Mayor and Aldermen of Savannah encouraged the location of Farm Lot 1 due to its proximity to the Greater Ogeechee Road that headed southwest of the city. Ogeechee Road cut through a portion of the northwest corner of the property. Vincent's 1852 map and Colton's 1855 map of Savannah depict Ogeechee Road traversing from the intersection of Montgomery and West Bolton to approximately the midpoint of the 300 block of West Gwinnett Street.

The land purchase satisfied a portion of debt from the estate of Matthew McAllister (Deed 2I-426, with plat), who had been appointed Attorney General of the Georgia District by President George Washington in 1789 and later served as mayor of Savannah.

Charles Seton Henry Hardee, in his autobiography "Reminiscences and Recollections of Old Savannah", identified the cantonment's location at Park Avenue and Whitaker Street. Hardee, who served as trusted treasurer of Savannah for over 40 years, attended a May festival at the site at age 10.

"Cerveau's Savannah" by Joseph Frederick Waring describes the cantonment as located south of Gwinnett Street and west of Whitaker Street, near a city dump. Waring also noted that a hot air balloon demonstration took place at the parade grounds on March 5, 1836, with admission required to watch Monsieur Frigent and a Savannah gentleman ascend in the balloon.

== Military Organization ==
The troops at Cantonment Oglethorpe were part of the Second Regiment of Artillery commanded by Brevet Colonel McRae. This Second Regiment of Artillery served within the Eastern Department of War under the command of Brevet Major General Edmund P. Gaines. Captains N. Baden and E. Lyon commanded Companies I and E of the Second Regiment at Cantonment Oglethorpe in 1828. Other branches of the Second Regiment of Artillery were located in: Charleston, South Carolina; Augusta, Georgia; and St. Augustine, Florida.

=== Notable personnel ===
Brevet 2nd Lieutenant Hugh W. Mercer joined Company E on February 28, 1829, while on duty at Fort Monroe in Virginia. He arrived at Cantonment Oglethorpe in March 1829 and was promoted to 2nd Lieutenant in May while in Augusta, Georgia. Mercer is last recorded in Monthly Returns in July 1834. He later became a prominent Savannah citizen and was a great-grandfather of songwriter Johnny Mercer.

== Legacy ==
1829 Cantonment Oglethorpe Plan upon Lloyd Ward Map, WPA 1939-40 (Courtesy City of Savannah Municipal Archives); Cantonment placement referenced by C.S.H. Hardee "Reminiscences and Recollections of Old Savannah".

After efforts by Georgia's US Senators and Representatives, The United States ceded the 28 acres of the former cantonment to the Mayor and Aldermen of the City of Savannah by joint resolution on January 20, 1853 (Deed 3L-108). Military Captains of Savannah were granted the 20 acres west of Whitaker in August 1853 for parade grounds. City of Savannah divided the eight acres east of Whitaker for residential lots.

By 1859, the Military Captains agreed to transfer their 20-acres for the land south of Forsyth Place, from Hall Street to New Houston Street (Park Avenue) and between Whitaker Street and Drayton Street to become their new parade grounds. In the transaction, City of Savannah's net benefit was $30,547 in 1861 dollars, which has a present value of $1,124,610 (2025)

Approximately 8 acres of the original 28-acres now comprise the southwest quadrant of Forsyth Park. The other 20 acres became the streets, lanes, and residential lots of Lloyd Ward.
