= Bernard M. Levinson =

Canadian-born American biblical scholar

Bernard Malcolm Levinson
- Born: 1952 (age 73–74); South Porcupine, Ontario
- Title: Professor of Classical and Near Eastern Studies and of Law

Academic background
- Education: York University, McMaster University
- Alma mater: Brandeis University (PhD)
- Thesis: (1991)
- Doctoral advisor: Michael Fishbane

Academic work
- Discipline: Biblical studies
- Institutions: Middlebury College; The Pennsylvania State University; Indiana University; University of Minnesota
- Notable works: Deuteronomy and the Hermeneutics of Legal Innovation

Bernard Malcolm Levinson serves as Professor of Classical and Near Eastern Studies and of Law at the University of Minnesota, where he holds the Berman Family Chair in Jewish Studies and Hebrew Bible. He is the author of Deuteronomy and the Hermeneutics of Legal Innovation, "The Right Chorale": Studies in Biblical Law and Interpretation, and Legal Revision and Religious Renewal in Ancient Israel; and is the co-editor of The Pentateuch as Torah: New Models for Understanding Its Promulgation and Acceptance. He has published extensively on biblical and ancient Near Eastern law and on the reception of biblical literature in the Second Temple period. His research interests extend to early modern intellectual history, constitutional theory, the history of interpretation, and literary approaches to biblical studies.

== Education ==
Levinson earned an Honors B.A. from York University in 1974, where he majored in Humanities and English and graduated with first class honors. He received his M.A in Religious Studies from McMaster University in 1978. Following his two years at McMaster, he spent a year as Visiting Researcher in Bible and Semitic Languages at the Hebrew University of Jerusalem. In 1991, under the advisor Michael Fishbane, he received a Ph.D. in Near Eastern and Judaic Studies from Brandeis University.

== Professional career ==
Bernard Levinson began his professional teaching career at Middlebury College in Vermont, teaching there for a semester each in 1983 and 1984. In 1987, he received a fellowship as the Stroum Fellow in Advanced Jewish Studies at the University of Washington in Seattle. Subsequently, while working on his dissertation, he taught full-time for two years in the Religious Studies Program at The Pennsylvania State University. Upon the completion of his dissertation, he was appointed to Indiana University in Bloomington, as an assistant professor in its Department of Near Eastern Languages and Cultures, with adjunct appointments to both Jewish Studies and Religious Studies. Midway through his appointment, he was invited to spend a year as a visiting scholar in the Faculty of Protestant Theology at Johannes Gutenberg University, in Mainz, Germany (1992–1993). After being tenured at Indiana University, he was appointed to the University of Minnesota's Department of Classical and Near Eastern Studies as the first inhabitant of the Berman Family Chair in Jewish Studies and Hebrew Bible. This position was the first endowed chair in the College of Liberal Arts and was seen as distinctive for confirming the significance of the academic study of religion within a public and state university. Shortly after his arrival, he received an appointment to the Law School as an affiliated faculty member. In 2009, he was promoted to the rank of full professor, and in 2010, honored as a scholar of the College of Liberal Arts 2010–2013.

The interdisciplinary significance of Levinson's work has been recognized with appointments to the Institute for Advanced Study (1997); the Wissenschaftskolleg zu Berlin/Berlin Institute for Advanced Study (2007); and to the National Humanities Center (Research Triangle, NC), as the Henry Luce Senior Fellow in Religious Studies (2011 academic year).

Bernard Levinson seeks to bring the academic biblical scholarship to the attention of a broader, non-specialist readership In this vein, he has recently written on the impact of the King James Version of the Bible upon the American Founding; drawn attention in the national press to the role of early feminist Bible scholars like Elizabeth Cady Stanton in helping win the vote for women; and, in his attention to language, has been cited in the Oxford English Dictionary.

On May 6, 2010, he was elected a fellow of the American Academy for Jewish Research, the oldest professional organization of Judaica scholars in North America. Fellows are nominated and elected by their peers and thus constitute the most distinguished and most senior scholars teaching Judaic studies at American universities.

Levinson was at the Institute for Advanced Studies at Hebrew University of Jerusalem during the 2012–13 academic year. During his time at IAS, he co-directed an international research team on a project titled "Convergence and Divergence in Pentateuchal Theory: Bridging the Academic Cultures of Israel, North America, and Europe" and co-organized an international conference, which was held on May 12–13, 2013. The conference featured presentations from a range of scholars and sought to further international exchange and establish a shared intellectual dialogue.

More recently, Levinson has co-organized a second international conference at IAS with the title "The Pentateuch within Biblical Literature: Formation and Interaction." This upcoming conference, scheduled for May 25–29, 2014, in Jerusalem, will focus primarily on the formation of the Pentateuch and its interaction with both the prophetic corpus and the historiographic literature of the Hebrew Bible.

== Views on the Bible ==
According to Levinson, standard analysis of the textual development of the Hebrew Bible moves from "oral to written, from individual poem, song, ecstatic utterance, to larger units, to larger collections, to books being combined together by redactors". Levinson asserts this is a necessary basic understanding, but that it is insufficient to explain how the separate constituent parts of text and tradition became invested with the kind of cultural authority needed to begin the process of creating scripture in the first place.

Cuneiform literature exhibits many of the same characteristics of Hebrew literature, but cuneiform never formed into "anything like a scripture, either with its distinctive textual features, ...[or] its distinctive ideological features, such as the truth claims it mounts, the extraordinary demands for adherence it requires from its audience to uphold the demands it seeks to place upon them, or the polemics it makes opposing competing ideologies". Levinson says, this makes the Pentateuch unique: "Nothing similar ever took place for the multiple legal collections or epic works of ancient Mesopotamia or the world of classical antiquity".

Levinson writes that the text, theology and culture of the Hebrew Bible "is neither “Jewish” nor “Christian” but distinctively Israelite". It is different from the text of the Samaritan Pentateuch which embeds material to make the text distinctively Samaritan. In contrast, the Hebrew Bible remains “Near Eastern” in its religious orientation and theological perspective". One example is Deuteronomy 32 which evidences the elimination of two verses proclaiming Yahweh's rule over a divine pantheon leaving a text that makes little sense. Such "corrections" were infrequent, and never systematic, and there are many cases where "problem texts" were allowed to remain in the Masoretic text, whereas the Septuagint corrected those texts "to align with normative Second Temple Jewish halakah". The Septuagint and the Samaritan text evidence changes that promote the point of view of their particular sect. The Masoretic text reflects the distinctiveness of ancient Israelite religion's theological, ethical, and doctrinal content, through the distinctive textual forms it developed.

Rabbinic Judaism in relation to Israelite religion was revolutionary. It transformed tradition as it gathered the complex collection that became the Tanakh during the Second Temple period. The Tanakh is neither conventionally Israelite nor conventionally Jewish. Its organization is didactic, and in many ways, counter–intuitive. It has a clear focus on Torah, and rejects concern over historical verisimilitude. It rejects consistency with common literary genres. As a narrative, it makes no sense: Deuteronomy ends with Israel not in the Promised land.

Yet its complex narrative brings conflicting texts together into a single larger corpus without privileging or excluding conflicting points of view. This evidences a complex concept of community that integrates competing interests and identities. "As Morton Smith suggested, the complex redaction of the Pentateuch seems to point to a social compromise between competing sectarian and ethnographic communities during the Second Temple period". The Tanakh stands as "a valuable heuristic challenge to modernizing attempts to appropriate it too easily into convenient cultural constructions".

== Selected awards and honors ==
- Elected fellow of the American Academy for Jewish Research (2010–present)
- Henry Luce Senior Fellow in Religion, National Humanities Center, Research Triangle Park, NC (2010)
- Scholar of the College Award, College of Liberal Arts, University of Minnesota (2010–13)
- Imagine Fund Award Winner (2009)
- Wissenschaftskolleg zu Berlin/Berlin Institute for Advanced Studies Fellowship (2007)
- National Endowment of the Humanities Summer Research Stipend (2004)
- Appointment to membership in Biblical Colloquium (2003)
- McNight Arts and Humanities Summer Fellowship (1999)
- Co-recipient of the 1999 Salo W. Baron Award for Best First Book in Literature and Thought from the American Academy for Jewish Research
- Member, Institute for Advanced Study (Princeton), School of Social Science (1997)
- Center for Advanced Judaic Studies, University of Pennsylvania (1997)
- NEH Summer Grant nomination; Indiana University Fellowship (1995)
- Stroum Fellowship for Advanced Research in Jewish Studies, University of Washington (1987)

== Editorial boards ==
- Co-editor, Journal of Ancient Judaism Supplement Series, Vandenhoeck & Ruprecht (2010– ).
- Editorial Board, International Exegetical Commentary on the Old Testament (2005– ).
- Editorial Board, Journal of Ancient Judaism (2010– ).
- Editorial Board, Journal of Biblical Literature (1998–2001; renewed, 2001–2004).
- Editorial Board, Zeitschrift für altorientalische und biblische Rechtsgeschichte (1994– ).

=== Books authored ===
- A More Perfect Torah: At the Intersection of Philology and Hermeneutics in Deuteronomy and the Temple Scroll. Critical Studies in the Hebrew Bible, vol. 1. Winona Lake, IN: Eisenbrauns, 2013. ISBN 978-1-57506-259-4
- Legal Revision and Religious Renewal in Ancient Israel. NY and Cambridge: Cambridge University Press, 2008. ISBN 978-0-521-51344-9
  - Paperback edition, 2010. ISBN 978-0-521-17191-5
  - Der kreative Kanon: Innerbiblische Schriftauslegung und religionsgeschichtlicher Wandel im alten Israel. Introduction by Prof. Dr. Hermann Spieckermann. Tübingen: Mohr Siebeck, 2012. This translation of Legal Revision and Religious Renewal in Ancient Israel is a new edition, revised and expanded for the German context. ISBN 978-3-161-51787-7
  - Fino alla quarta generazione: Revisione di leggi e rinnovamento religioso nell’Israele antico. Rome: Gregorian University and Pontifical Biblical Institute Press, 2012. ISBN 978-8-821-57134-3
  - Revisão legal e renovação religiosa no Antigo Israel. São Paulo, Brazil: Paulus Editora, 2011. ISBN 978-8-534-93279-0
  - L’herméneutique de l’innovation: Canon et exégèse dans l’Israël biblique. Introduction by Jean Louis Ska. Le livre et le rouleau 24. Brussels: Editions Lessius, 2006. ISBN 978-2-87299-146-4
- "The Right Chorale": Studies in Biblical Law and Interpretation. Forschungen zum Alten Testament 54; Tübingen: Mohr Siebeck, 2008. ISBN 978-3-16-149382-9
  - Paperback edition, 2011. ISBN 978-1-57506-210-5
- Deuteronomy and the Hermeneutics of Legal Innovation. Oxford and New York: Oxford University Press, 1997.
  - Paperback edition, 2002. ISBN 978-0-19-511280-1
  - Korean translation (Osan-City, South Korea: Hanshin University Press, 2009). ISBN 978-89-7806-128-5

=== Books edited ===
- Institutionalized Routine Prayers at Qumran: Fact or Assumption? Paul Heger and Bernard M. Levinson. Göttingen: Vandenhoeck & Ruprecht, 2019. ISBN 978-3-525-57131-6
- The Formation of the Pentateuch: Bridging the Academic Discourses of Europe, Israel, and North America. Edited by Jan C. Gertz, Bernard M. Levinson, Dalit Rom-Shiloni, and Konrad Schmid. Göttingen: Vandenhoeck & Ruprecht, 2019. ISBN 978-3-16-153883-4
- The Pentateuch as Torah: New Models for Understanding Its Promulgation and Acceptance. Gary N. Knoppers, co-editor. Winona Lake: Eisenbrauns, 2007. ISBN 978-3-16-153883-4
- Theory and Method in Biblical and Cuneiform Law: Revision, Interpolation, and Development. Classic Reprints series, Sheffield: Sheffield Phoenix, 2006. ISBN 978-1-905048-61-8
- Judge and Society in Antiquity. Edited by Aaron Skaist and Bernard M. Levinson. Special double issue of MAARAV: A Journal for the Study of the Northwest Semitic Languages and Literatures 12.1–2 (2005).
- Recht und Ethik im Alten Testament: Studies in Honor of Gerhard von Rad. Eckart Otto, co-editor, with Walter Dietrich. Münster/London: LIT, 2004. ISBN 978-3-8258-5460-7
- Gender and Law in the Hebrew Bible and the Ancient Near East. Victor H. Matthews and Tikva Frymer-Kensky, co-editors. JSOTSup 262. Sheffield: Sheffield Academic Press, 1998; paperback, 2004. ISBN 978-0-567-54500-8

=== Commentaries ===
- "Introduction to Deuteronomy.” Pages 61–76 in Engaging Torah: Modern Perspectives on the Hebrew Bible. Edited by Walter Homolka and Aaron Panken. Cincinnati: Hebrew Union College Press, 2018. ISBN 978-0878201594
- "Deuteronomy: Introduction and Commentary." Pages 356–450 in The Jewish Study Bible. Edited by Adele Berlin and Marc Zvi Brettler. New York: Oxford University Press, 2003. Second edition (significantly revised), 2014. Pages 339–428. ISBN 978-0-19-997846-5
- "Deuteronomy." In New Oxford Annotated Bible. Third edition. New York and Oxford: Oxford University Press, 2000, 240–313. Revised for The New Oxford Annotated Bible, with the Apocrypha: An Ecumenical Study Bible. Fully Revised Fourth Edition. Edited by Michael D. Coogan. New York: Oxford University Press, 2010. Pages 247–312. ISBN 978-0-19-528478-2

=== Selected articles and book chapters ===
- “Strategies for the Reinterpretation of Normative Texts within the Hebrew Bible,” International Journal of Legal Discourse 3 (2018): 1–31.
- "Refining the Reconstruction of Col. 2 of the Temple Scroll (11QTa): The Turn to Digital Mapping and Historical Syntax," in Dead Sea Discoveries: A Journal of Current Research on the Scrolls and Related Literature 23:1 (2016): 1–26.
- "Better That You Should Not Vow Than That You Vow and Not Fulfill’: Qoheleth’s Use of Textual Allusion and the Transformation of Deuteronomy’s Law of Vows." Pages 28–41 in Reading Ecclesiastes Intertextually. Edited by Katharine Dell and Will Kynes. Library of Hebrew Bible/Old Testament Studies, vol. 587. London: T&T Clark, 2014.
- "The Limitations of ‘Resonance.’ A Response to Joshua Berman on Historical and Comparative Method," (Co-author: Jeffrey Stackert), in Journal of Ancient Judaism, 4 (2013): 310–333.
- "This is the Manner of the Remission’: Legal Exegesis and Eschatological Syntax in 11QMelchizedek," (Co-author: Michael Bartos), in Journal of Biblical Literature, 132:2 (2013): 351–371.
- "La scoperta goethiana della versione 'originale' dei Dieci Comandamenti e la sua influenza sulla critica biblica: Il mito del particolarismo ebraico e dell'universalismo tedesco." Pages 71–90 in Il roveto ardente: Scritti sull’ebraismo Tedesco in memoria di Francesca Y. Albertini. Edited by Irene Kajon. Rome: Lithos Editrice, 2013.
- "Between the Covenant Code and Esarhaddon's Succession Treaty: Deuteronomy 13 and the Composition of Deuteronomy," (Co-author: Jeffrey Stackert), in Journal of Ancient Judaism, 3 (2012): 123–140.
- "Die neuassyrischen Ursprünge der Kanonformel in Deuteronomium 13,1.'" Pages 23–59 in Viele Wege zu dem Einen: Historische Bibelkritik - Die Vitalität der Glaubensüberlieferung in der Moderne. Edited by Stefan Beyerle, Axel Graupner, and Udo Rüterswörden. Biblisch-theologische Studien 121. Neukirchen Vluyn: Neukirchener Verlag, 2012.
- "The Development of the Jewish Bible: Critical Reflections upon the Concept of a 'Jewish Bible' and on the Idea of Its 'Development.'" Pages 377–392 in What is Bible? Edited by Karin Finsterbusch and Armin Lange. Leuven: Peeters Publishers, 2012.
- "Esarhaddon's Succession Treaty as the Source for the Canon Formula in Deuteronomy 13:1," Journal of the American Oriental Society 130 (2010): 337–347.
- "Gab es eine Bundestheologische Redaktion des Deuteronomiums?," in Viele Wege zu dem Einen: Historische Bibelkritik - Die Vitalität der Glaubensüberlieferung in der Moderne. Edited by Stefan Beyerle and Axel Graupner. Neukirchen-Vluyn: Neukirchener Verlag, forthcoming in 2011.
- "Deuteronomy." The Encyclopedia of the Bible. Edited by Michael D. Coogan. New York: Oxford University Press, 2011.
- "The King James Bible at 400: Scripture, Statecraft, and the American Founding." (Co-author: Joshua A. Berman). The History Channel Magazine, special supplement, November 2010, pp. 1–11.
- "The Neo-Assyrian Origins of the Canon Formula in Deuteronomy 13:1." Pages 25–45 in Scriptural Exegesis: The Shapes of Culture and the Religious Imagination (Essays in Honour of Michael Fishbane). Edited by Deborah A. Green and Laura Lieber. Oxford: Oxford University Press, 2009.
- "Reading the Bible in Nazi Germany: Gerhard von Rad's Attempt to Reclaim the Old Testament for the Church." Interpretation: A Journal of Bible and Theology 62.3 (July, 2008): 238–53.
- "The First Constitution: Rethinking the Origins of Rule of Law and Separation of Powers in Light of Deuteronomy." Cardozo Law Review 27:4 (2006): 1853–1888.
- "'Du sollst nichts hinzufügen und nichts wegnehmen' (Dtn 13,1): Rechtsreform und Hermeneutik in der Hebräischen Bibel." Zeitschrift für Theologie und Kirche 102 (2006): 157–183.
- "The Manumission of Hermeneutics: The Slave Laws of the Pentateuch as a Challenge to Contemporary Pentateuchal Theory." Pages 281–324 in Congress Volume Leiden 2004. Edited by André Lemaire. Vetus Testamentum Supplements 109. Leiden: E. J. Brill, 2006.
- "The Birth of the Lemma: Recovering the Restrictive Interpretation of the Covenant Code's Manumission Law by the Holiness Code (Lev 25:44–46)." Journal of Biblical Literature 124 (2005): 617–639.
- "The Metamorphosis of Law into Gospel: Gerhard von Rad's Attempt to Reclaim the Old Testament for the Church" (with Douglas Dance). In Recht und Ethik im Alten Testament. Edited by Bernard M. Levinson and Eckart Otto. Münster/London: LIT Verlag, 2004, 83–110.
- "Is the Covenant Code an Exilic Composition? A Response to John Van Seters." In In Search of Pre-Exilic Israel: Proceedings of the Oxford Old Testament Seminar. Edited by John Day. Journal for the Study of the Old Testament: Supplement Series, vol. 406. London & New York: T. & T. Clark, 2004, 272–325.
- "'You Must Not Add Anything to What I Command You': Paradoxes of Canon and Authorship in Ancient Israel." Numen: International Review for the History of Religions 50 (2003): 1–51.
- "Goethe's Analysis of Exodus 34 and Its Influence on Julius Wellhausen: The Pfropfung of the Documentary Hypothesis." Zeitschrift für die alttestamentliche Wissenschaft 114 (2002): 212–23.
- "Revelation Regained: The Hermeneutics of כי and אם in the Temple Scroll" (Co-author: Molly M. Zahn). Dead Sea Discoveries: A Journal of Current Research on the Scrolls and Related Literature 9:3 (2002): 295–346.
- "Textual Criticism, Assyriology, and the History of Interpretation: Deuteronomy 13:7a as a Test Case in Method." Journal of Biblical Literature 120 (2001): 211–43.

==== Selected review articles ====
- Review of Susannah Heschel, The Aryan Jesus: Christian Theologian and the Bible in Nazi Germany. (Co-author: Tina Sherman). Review of Biblical Literature (2010).
- "The Bible's Break with Ancient Political Thought to Promote Equality—'It Ain't Necessarily So.'" A review article of Joshua Berman, Created Equal: How the Bible Broke with Ancient Political Thought. The Journal of Theological Studies 61:2 (2010). Online advance access: doi:10.1093/jts/flq048.
- Essay review of Michael Fishbane, Sacred Attunement: A Jewish Theology. Interpretation: A Journal of Bible and Theology 64 (2010): 294–300.
