= Oglethorpe Barracks =

Coordinates: 32°4.448′N 81°5.592′W

Oglethorpe Barracks usually refers to a 19th-century United States Army post in the historic district of Savannah, Georgia. Some sources use the title to refer to Fort James Jackson (also known as Fort Oglethorpe) or Fort Wayne, both near Savannah. A hotel constructed in the 1880s now sits on the site of the old barracks.

== Origin ==
In 1824, City of Savannah, Georgia, petitioned Secretary of War John C. Calhoun to build a military barracks within the city and agreed to purchase the necessary land. The War Department agreed to the endeavor and furnished the materials to build the barracks. The barracks took the name of James Oglethorpe, founder of Georgia colony and of the settlement of Savannah.

Weather observations from 1827-1835 cited in Grice's study were likely collected at Cantonment Oglethorpe, a separate artillery installation located outside the city that operated from 1826 to 1835. Following years of high mortality from malaria at the cantonment, troops relocated to the newly constructed Oglethorpe Barracks on Liberty Street in May 1835.

Construction of Oglethorpe Barracks finished circa 1834. The weather station began using a rain gauge in 1836. Meteorological observations continued through December 1850.

== Civil War ==
Local Confederate volunteer companies occupied Oglethorpe Barracks throughout American Civil War until Union General William Tecumseh Sherman captured the city in 1864.

== Reconstruction era ==
United States Army troops continued to occupy Fort Oglethorpe after the end of the Civil War. Meteorological observations resumed in or before September 1866.

In 1875, a brick wall 10 feet (3.0 m) high enclosed the barracks and connected the buildings that abutted city streets. The buildings on the post surrounded a courtyard that functioned as its parade ground. Army surgeons took weather observations at the barracks hospital, a frame building abutting Harris Street with an 11-foot (3.4 m)-tall brick foundation 62 feet (19 m) long and 40 feet (12 m) wide. The frame hospital building measured 19 feet (5.8 m) above its foundation and extended 10 feet (3.0 m) beyond its foundation on each end, where square brick pillars supported the building. A two-story frame guard house building lay east of the hospital along Harris Street and measured 30 feet (9.1 m) long, 30 feet (9.1 m) wide, and 30 feet (9.1 m) high. A two-story brick building abutted Harris Street west of the hospital.

During the long summer of 1876, the troops transferred to Camp Oglethorpe near Oliver, Georgia.

== Decommissioning ==
The Army left Oglethorpe Barracks after March 1879, when meteorological observations ceased. The Signal Service office in Savannah continued the record of meteorological observations for the city at another location. The War Department later in 1879 sold the parcel to Savannah Hotel Corporation for $75,000. Congress in 1883 directed Secretary of War Robert Todd Lincoln to sell Oglethorpe Barracks.

The new owner then tore down the barracks. Construction of Desoto Hotel on the site of the former barracks began in 1888 and completed in 1890. The hotel featured five stories, 206 rooms, a solarium, a barber shop, a drug store, and a restaurant; a swimming pool (outdoor) was added later. A fountain featuring the head of a lion with water flowing out its mouth was a feature of the hotel, which remain today. For a number of years, a local radio station WCCP, later WBYG, had studios in the hotel. Hilton now operates the hotel.

The Army closed Fort James Jackson in 1902.

The parcel on which Oglethorpe Barracks once stood now lies just northeast of Madison Square in historic old Savannah.
