= Andrea Weiss (rabbi) =

American rabbi and author (1965–2026)

Rabbi Andrea L. Weiss
- Born: September 9, 1965; San Diego, California, US
- Died: March 3, 2026 (aged 60); Lower Merion, Pennsylvania, US
- Education: University of California, Berkeley (Bachelor of Arts, 1987) Hebrew Union College – Jewish Institute of Religion (Master's Degree Hebrew Letters, 1991) University of Pennsylvania (PhD, 2004)
- Occupation: Rabbinical ordination (1993)
- Employer: Hebrew Union College – Jewish Institute of Religion (2000 to 2026)
- Notable work: The Torah: A Women's Commentary (Associate editor)
- Title: Associate Professor of Bible (2000 to 2026); Jack, Joseph and Morton Mandel Provost, Hebrew Union College – Jewish Institute of Religion (2018 to 2025)

Andrea Lynn Weiss (September 9, 1965 – March 3, 2026) was an American rabbi and author who was an Associate Professor of Bible, and Director of the Rabbinical School at Hebrew Union College, where she was ordained in 1993 and became provost in 2018, serving in that role into 2025. She earned a PhD from the University of Pennsylvania in 2004. She was associate editor of The Torah: A Women’s Commentary, published in 2008. In 2019, Weiss became the first woman to ordain rabbis and cantors in the Jewish Reform Movement.

== Early life and education ==
Weiss was born on September 9, 1965, and raised in San Diego by her parents, Marty and Ruth Weiss. Her paternal great-grandmother, Sadie Fleischer, emigrated to the United States from what is now Poland in the early 1900s and later married Brooklyn tailor Aaron Weiss. Their son Sam Weiss (Weiss's grandfather) married a woman named Blanche at age 20. They settled in San Diego in 1940 and remained married for 81 years, until Blanche's death.

Weiss grew up attending a small Reform Jewish synagogue in San Diego, Temple Emanu-El, in which she was very involved, and a regional Reform Jewish summer camp, Camp Swig. She received a Bachelor of Arts degree in English from the University of California, Berkeley in 1987. Weiss considered studying law before deciding to pursue rabbinical studies at Hebrew Union College – Jewish Institute of Religion (HUC-JIR) in Los Angeles. Weiss stated, "I decided to be a rabbi right before I was going to apply to law school . . . I wanted to make my advocation my vocation". In 1991, Weiss earned her master's degree in Hebrew Letters from HUC-JIR in Los Angeles.

While a third-year rabbinical student in 1990, the 25-year-old Weiss conducted services one weekend a month for the 40-person Etz Chaim congregation in Merced, California. She found that while some congregants initially might find it difficult to see a woman leading prayers, over time they became more accepting, and some were appreciative of the opportunity this presented for their own children. Intending to invigorate the congregation and make their role more active, during a Yom Kippur service at Etz Chaim, Weiss had the congregants participate in a mock trial of the biblical prophet Jonah.

== Rabbi, academic and author ==
In 1993, Weiss was ordained as a rabbi at HUC-JIR in New York. In 2000, Weiss joined the faculty of HUC-JIR in New York, as an Associate Professor of Bible. She earned a PhD from the University of Pennsylvania in 2004, in the department of Near Eastern Studies and Civilizations. She was later a visiting professor at the University of Pennsylvania. In 2018, Weiss was appointed HUC-JIR's Jack, Joseph and Morton Mandel Provost, serving through the COVID-19 pandemic until June 2025. She served as Head of Seminary and Rabbinical School Director at HUC-JIR. In 2019, Weiss became the first woman to ordain rabbis in the Jewish Reform Movement.

In 1993, Weiss was an editor of the publication "Shalom/Salaam: A Resource for Jewish-Muslim Dialogue". In 2006, Weiss published the book Figurative Language in Biblical Prose Narrative: Metaphor in the Book of Samuel (Supplements to Vetus Testamentum).

Weiss is best known as the associate editor of The Torah: A Women’s Commentary, which won the 2008 Jewish Book of the Year Award from the Jewish Book Council. The book consists of five forms of biblical exegesis, by hundreds of women authors. Weiss was once a student of Tamara Cohn Eskenazi, who was the chief editor of the book, and who had selected Weiss as associate editor. Weiss previewed drafts of the book to Jewish congregations across the United States during the two years preceding its publication. In addition to the valuable perspectives offered by and to women, Weiss would often have to explain the book's essays and commentaries were also important to men as a body of work falling within the Jewish tradition of biblical exegesis and commentaries. United States Senator Elissa Slotkin was sworn in on the book.

In 2009, Weiss was one of the scholars participating in the Columbia University year-long seminar, "The Study of the Hebrew Bible"; presenting on the topic "Mixed Metaphor in Biblical Poetry". Weiss gave the 2012 Goodman Lecture at St. Catherine's University on "Ancient Words, New Voices: The Story of The Torah—A Women’s Commentary". Weiss frequently was asked to serve as a scholar-in-residence. Among other times serving as a scholar-in-residence, in 2006, she was a scholar-in-residence for Temple Israel in West Palm Beach, Florida; in 2007, she was scholar-in-residence for Temple Beth El in Closter, New Jersey; in 2012, Weiss was a Goldstein/Leibson scholar-in-residence in Louisville, Kentucky; in 2018, Weiss was the scholar-in-residence for the Shaare Emeth congregation in St. Louis; in 2019, she was the Burstein Scholar-in-Residence at Temple Israel in Boston; and in 2024, she was scholar-in-residence at Congregation Beth Israel, in Houston.

In 2016–17, and again in 2020–21, Weiss initiated and led the nonpartisan interfaith American Values, Religious Voices campaign, involving the writing of 100 350-word letters by faith leaders directed to political leaders in the United States. These letters collectively have been published in two books. The Center for American Progress named Weiss as a faith leader to watch in 2018 because of her efforts to highlight the voices of a diverse set of religious scholars.

The 2022 art exhibit “Holy Sparks”, shown among other places at the Dr. Bernard Heller Museum, featured art about twenty-four female rabbis who were firsts in some way; Debbie Teicholz Guedalia created the artwork about Weiss that was in that exhibit.

== Legacy ==
Rabbi Rick Jacobs stated after Weiss's death: "A generation of rabbis, cantors and educators were blessed to study Hebrew Bible with her. For an even wider audience, 'The Torah: A Women's Torah Commentary,' which she edited with Tamara Eskenazi, helped open hearts and minds to see the biblical text through the eyes and experiences of women". HUC president Andrew Rehfeld stated: "Rabbi Weiss has been a transformative presence at Hebrew Union College for more than two decades . . . Her scholarship, vision, and fierce commitment to the formation of Jewish clergy have shaped this institution in ways that will endure for generations. We are grateful beyond measure for her service and hold her and her loved ones in our hearts". While provost, Weiss was a proponent of curricular redesign, the Virtual Pathway for Rabbinical students program, and the Seminary Hebrew Program, among other things.

== Personal life and death ==
Weiss was married to Alan J. Tauber, an attorney who was the first assistant, and later interim chief defender, at the Defender Association of Philadelphia; and had two children, Rebecca Tauber, a staff editor at The Athletic, and Ilan Tauber. Her husband was among the lawyers who helped exonerate the wrongfully convicted Chester Hollman, an innocent person who had spent 28 years in prison. Weiss came to know Hollman’s thoughtful, determined, insightful and compassionate nature; and spoke on, and gave light to, the biblical lessons that could be learned from the way Hollman faced extraordinary injustice and adversity in his life without losing hope and faith.

Just a few months before her death, Weiss wrote in her personal journal, "To live with love and gratitude. To love with generosity. To experience joy and connection day in and day out for as many days as I am gifted".

Weiss died in Lower Merion, Pennsylvania, on March 3, 2026, at the age of 60, after struggling with cancer for a year.
