= Tamara Cohn Eskenazi =

American rabbi

Tamara Cohn Eskenazi is The Effie Wise Ochs Professor of Biblical Literature and History at the Reform Jewish seminary Hebrew Union College-Jewish Institute of Religion in Los Angeles.

She was the first woman hired by the Hebrew Union College-Jewish Institute of Religion as a full-time tenure track faculty member for their rabbinical school in 1990, and became the first female tenured full professor in their rabbinical school in 1995.

She was also the chief editor of The Torah: A Women’s Commentary (Andrea Weiss was associate editor), which won the 2008 Jewish Book of the Year Award from the Jewish Book Council.

On May 19, 2013, Eskenazi was ordained as a rabbi by the Hebrew Union College-Jewish Institute of Religion.

In November of 2022, Eskenazi was elected vice president of the Society of Biblical Literature; in November 2023, Eskenazi was elevated to president of the society.

== Recognition ==
In 2011, Eskenazi and the late Tikva Frymer-Kensky won the 2011 National Jewish Book Award in Women’s Studies for The JPS Bible Commentary: Ruth.

The 2022 art exhibit “Holy Sparks”, shown among other places at the Dr. Bernard Heller Museum, featured art about twenty-four female rabbis who were firsts in some way; Carol Hamoy created the artwork about Eskenazi that was in that exhibit.

== Selected works ==
- In an age of prose : a literary approach to Ezra-Nehemiah, 1986
- Second Temple studies. Temple and community in the Persian period , 1991
- The Torah : a women's commentary , 2008
- Ruth : the traditional Hebrew text with the new JPS translation , 2011
