= Victor H. Matthews =

American Old Testament scholar (born 1950)

- Born: November 13, 1950 (age 75); Joplin, Missouri
- Occupations: Retired Dean of the College of Humanities and Public Affairs and emeritus professor of religious studies at Missouri State University

Academic background
- Education: Brandeis University (PhD)

Academic work
- Institutions: Missouri State University
- Main interests: Biblical Backgrounds, Social World of the Old Testament

Victor Harold Matthews (born 13 November 1950) is an American Old Testament scholar. He is the retired Dean of the College of Humanities and Public Affairs and professor emeritus of religious studies at Missouri State University.

Matthews was born in Joplin, Missouri. He obtained a PhD at Brandeis University. In 2015, the fourth edition of Matthews' book, The Cultural World of the Bible, was published.

== Work ==
Stephen Pattison notes that Matthews "has led the paradigm shift on shame issues" in Old Testament studies.

== Publications ==
=== Books ===
- Matthews, Victor H. (1978). Pastoral Nomadism in the Mari Kingdom. ASOR.
- ——— (1988). Manners and Customs in the Bible. Peabody, MA: Hendrickson Publisher.
- ———; Benjamin, Don C. (1991). Old Testament Parallels: Laws and Stories from the Ancient Near East. New York City, NY: Paulist Press. ISBN 978-0-809-13182-2. OCLC 22907778.
- ——— (1991). Manners and Customs in the Bible: An Illustrated Guide to Daily Life in Bible Times. Peabody, MA: Hendrickson Publisher.
- ———; Benjamin, Don C. (1993). Social World of Ancient Israel, 1250-587 BCE. Peabody, MA: Hendrickson Publisher.
- ———; Moyer, James C. (1997). The Old Testament: Text and Context. Peabody, MA: Hendrickson Publisher.
- ———; Levinson, Bernard M.; Frymer-Kensky, Tikva (1998). Gender and Law in the Hebrew Bible and the Ancient Near East. Sheffield: Sheffield Academic Press.
- ———; Walton, John H.; Chavalas, Mark W. (2000). The IVP Bible Background Commentary: Old Testament. Downers Grove, IL: InterVarsity Press.
- ——— (2001). Social World of the Hebrew Prophets. Peabody, MA: Hendrickson Publisher.
- ——— (2002). A Brief History of Ancient Israel. Louisville, KY: Westminster, John Knox Press.
- ——— (2004). Judges and Ruth. New Cambridge Bible Commentary. Cambridge: Cambridge University Press.
- ——— (2005). Old Testament Turning Points: The Narratives That Shaped a Nation. Grand Rapids, MI: Baker Academic.
- ———; Benjamin, Don C. (2007). Old Testament Parallels: Laws and Stories from the Ancient Near East (3rd revised ed.). New York City, NY: Paulist Press. ISBN 978-0-809-14435-8.
- ——— (2007). Studying the Ancient Israelites: A Guide to Sources and Methods. Downers Grove, IL: Apollos.
- ——— (2007). 101 Questions & Answers on The Prophets of Israel. New York City, NY: Paulist Press, 2007.
- ——— (2012). The Hebrew Prophets and Their Social World: An Introduction. Grand Rapids, MI: Baker Academic.
- ——— (2015). The Cultural World of the Bible: An Illustrated Guide to Manners and Customs (4th revised ed.). Grand Rapids, MI: Baker Academic. ISBN 978-0-801-04973-6.
- ——— (2019). The history of Bronze and Iron Age Israel. New York City, NY: Oxford University Press. ISBN 9780190231149.

=== Articles and chapters ===
- ——— (1989). "Freedom and Entrapment in the Samson Narrative: A Literary Analysis". Perspectives in Religious Studies. 19: 245–257.
