= Tikva Frymer-Kensky =

American theologian (1943–2006)

- תקווה פריימר-קנסקי
- Born: October 21, 1943; West Side, Chicago, Illinois
- Died: August 31, 2006 (aged 62)
- Education: Yale University (MA, PhD)
- Occupation: Professor
- Employer: University of Chicago Divinity School
- Spouse: Rabbi Allan Kensky
- Children: Meira, Eitan
- Theological work
- Era: Late 20th and early 21st centuries
- Language: English
- Tradition or movement: Jewish
- Main interests: Assyriology, Sumerology, Biblical studies, Jewish studies, women and religion

Tikva Simone Frymer-Kensky (Hebrew: תקווה פריימר-קנסקי; October 21, 1943 – August 31, 2006) was a professor at the University of Chicago Divinity School. She received her MA and PhD from Yale University. She had previously served on the faculties of Wayne State University, the Jewish Theological Seminary of America, Yale University, Ben Gurion University, and the Reconstructionist Rabbinical College, where she served as director of Biblical studies.

== Academic career ==
Her areas of specialization included Assyriology and Sumerology, biblical studies, Jewish studies, and women and religion. Her most recent books are "Reading the Women of the Bible," which received a Koret Jewish Book Award in 2002 and a National Jewish Book Award in 2003; In the Wake of the Goddesses: Women, Culture and the Biblical Transformation of Pagan Myth; and Motherprayer: The Pregnant Woman's Spiritual Companion.

She was also the English translator of From Jerusalem to the Edge of Heaven by Ari Elon (Alma Dee, original Hebrew). In progress at the time of her death were The JPS Bible Commentary: Ruth, a book on biblical theology, and a book on Genesis.

In 1996, the Alumni Association of the Albert A. List College, along with the Graduate School of the Jewish Theological Seminary, presented her with a citation in honor of her accomplishments. The citation celebrates her "prodigious number of well-received books and articles," and her status as "a powerful advocate for Jewish feminism at the numerous conferences at which you lectured....you have shown a light on Biblical periods in which women occupied public office and enjoyed powerful prominent roles in the community."

In 2005, she was named one of the Jewish Chicagoans of the Year by The Chicago Jewish News.

In 2006, the Jewish Publication Society published a collection of her articles, "Studies in Bible and Feminist Criticism", as part of their Scholar of Distinction series. She is the first woman to have her work included in this series, as well as having been the youngest person anthologized in this prestigious series.

In 2011, she posthumously won the National Jewish Book Award in Women's Studies for The JPS Bible Commentary: Ruth. Her coauthor for that book, who also won, was Tamara Cohn Eskenazi.

== Criticism ==
While some of Frymer-Kensky's conclusions about the development of religions are popular and often quoted, her contributions to the study of ancient Near East were met with criticism from many Assyriologists and other specialists.

Julia M. Asher-Greve, who specializes in the study of position of women in antiquity, praises her for being "first in addressing the questions of divine sexual difference and sexuality" in the field of Assyriology but criticizes her focus on fertility, the small selection of sources her works relied on, her view that position of goddesses in the pantheon reflected that of ordinary women in society (so-called "mirror theory"), as well as the fact her works do not accurately reflect the complexity of changes of roles of goddesses in religions of ancient Mesopotamia. Ilona Zsolnay likewise criticizes the "mirror theory" and focus on "fertility cult," which she views as a faulty methodology.

JoAnn Scurlock, who wrote extensively about medicine in ancient Mesopotamia, notes that Frymer-Kensky's claim that the healing goddess Gula/Ninisinna was replaced by her son Damu is unfounded, and that Damu was a very minor deity, while his mother was remarkably popular (even among almost exclusively male physicians), and even in "Marduk-centric" Weidner chronicle played a prominent role.

Alhena Gadotti, who researchers Mesopotamian myths dealing with the underworld, questioned Frymer-Kensky's interpretation of the myth of Nergal and Ereshkigal, pointing out that Ereshkigal had a much smaller role in religion than Nergal (as originally noted by prominent Assyriologist Frans Wiggermann) and that the narrative doesn't contradict Ereshkigal's position in other sources, and as such cannot be regarded as "demotion."

Steve A. Wiggins, who specializes in the mythology of Ugarit, praises some of her contributions to the study of Asherah, but notes that she relied on the incorrect modern notion of Athirat (Asherah), Anat and Ashtart as a trinity and as the only prominent goddesses in the religion of Ugarit.

== Bibliography ==
=== Books ===
- Frymer-Kensky, Tikva (1977). The Judicial Ordeal in the Ancient Near East (PhD). Ann Arbor, MI: Yale University & University Microfilms International. OCLC 13484497.
- ——— (1992). In the Wake of the Goddesses: Women, Culture, and the Biblical Transformation of Pagan Myth. New York: Macmillan, Free Press. ISBN 978-0-029-10800-0. OCLC 23901115.
- ——— (1995). Motherprayer: The Pregnant Woman's Spiritual Companion. New York: G. P. Putnum's Sons.
- ——— (2002). Reading the Women of the Bible: A New Interpretation of Their Stories. New York: Shocken Books. ISBN 0-8052-4121-3.
- ——— (2006). Studies in Bible and Feminist Criticism. Philadelphia: Jewish Publication Society. ISBN 0-8276-0798-9.
- ———; Eskenazi, Tamara Cohn (2011). Ruth: the traditional Hebrew text with the new JPS translation. JPS Bible commentary. Philadelphia, PA: Jewish Publication Society. ISBN 978-0-8276-0744-6. OCLC 681497553.

=== Edited books ===
- ———; Matthews, Victor H.; Levinson, Bernard M., eds. (1998). Gender and Law in the Hebrew Bible and the Ancient Near East. Journal for the Study of the Old Testament, Supplement Series. Vol. 262. Sheffield, Eng: Sheffield Academic Press]. ISBN 978-1-850-75886-0. OCLC 39685338.
- ———; Ochs, Peter W.; Novak, David; Signer, Michael A.; Sandmel, David, eds. (2000). Christianity in Jewish Terms. Radical Tradition. Boulder, CO: Westview Press. ISBN 978-0-8133-3780-7. OCLC 44426860.

=== Translations ===
- Elon, Ari (1996). From Jerusalem to the Edge of Heaven. Translated by Frymer-Kensky, Tikva. Philadelphia, PA: Jewish Publication Society. ISBN 0-8276-0525-0.

=== Selected articles ===
- ——— (2006). "The Image, the Glory, and the Holy: Aspects of Being Human in Biblical Thought". In Schweiker, William (ed.). Humanity Before God: Contemporary Faces of Jewish, Christian, and Islamic Ethics. Minneapolis: Fortress.
- ———. "A Survey of Prehistory". In Blumfield, Honeydew (ed.). Anthropological Perspectives. In-House Textbook for the Open University, University College, University of Maryland.

== See also ==
- Dabru Emet
