= The Bible and slavery =

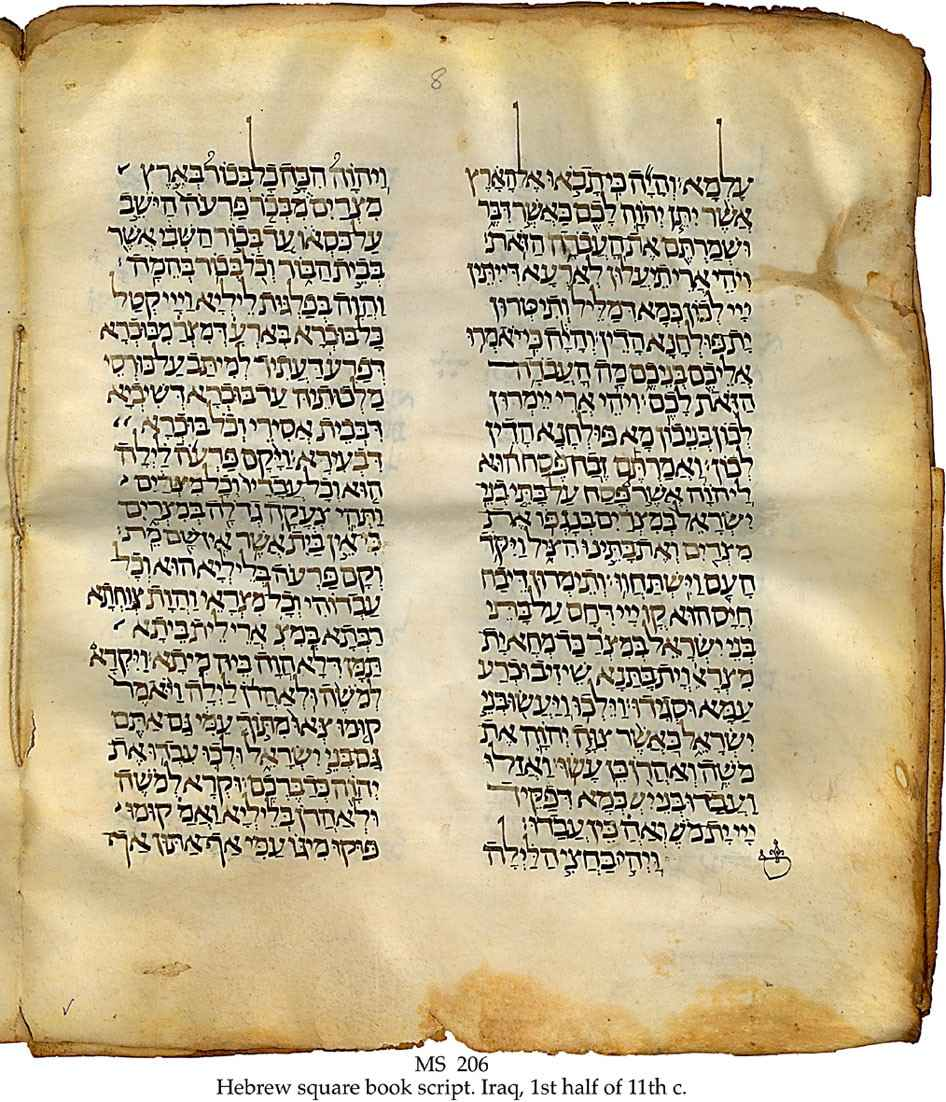
11th-century manuscript of the Hebrew Bible with Targum, Exodus 12:25–31

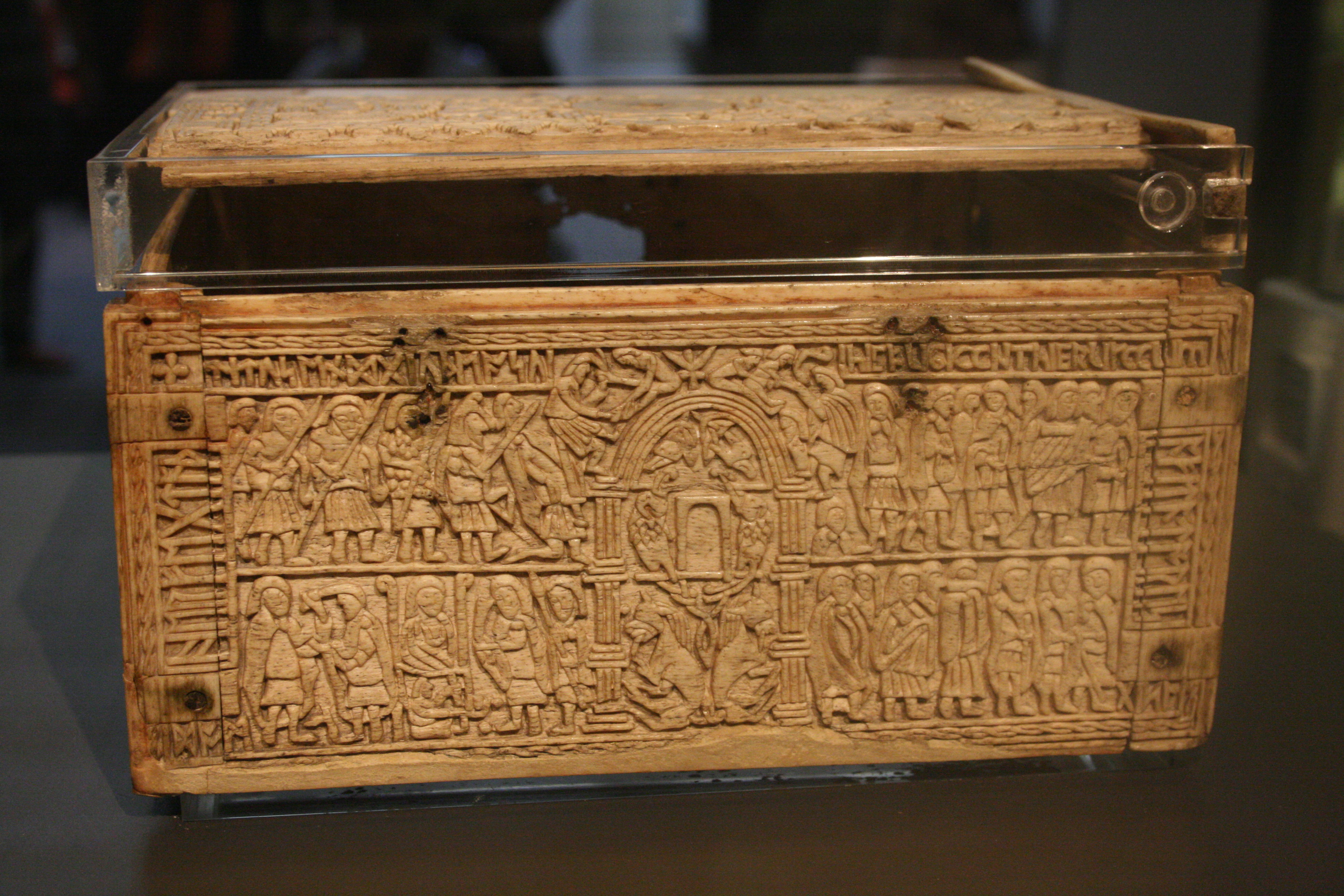
The Franks Casket is an 8th-century Anglo-Saxon whalebone casket, the back of which depicts the enslavement of the Jewish people at the lower right.

The Bible contains many references to slavery, which was a common practice in antiquity. In the course of human history, slavery was a typical feature of civilization, predated written records, and existed in most societies throughout history. Slavery is an economic phenomenon. Biblical texts outline sources and the legal status of slaves, economic roles of slavery, types of slavery, and debt slavery, which thoroughly explain the institution of slavery in Israel in antiquity. The Bible stipulates the treatment of slaves, especially in the Old Testament. There are also references to slavery in the New Testament. In both testaments and Jewish culture, there are also practices of manumission, releasing from slavery. The treatment and experience of slaves in both testaments was complex, diverse and differed from those of surrounding cultures.

Many of the patriarchs portrayed in the Bible were from the upper echelons of society, owned slaves, enslaved those in debt to them, bought their fellow citizens' daughters as concubines, and consistently enslaved foreign men to work on their fields. Masters were usually men, but the Bible portrays upper-class women from Sarah to Esther and Judith with their enslaved maids, as do the Elephantine papyri in the 400s BC.

It was necessary for those who owned slaves, especially in large numbers, to be wealthy because the masters had to pay taxes for Jewish and non-Jewish slaves because they were considered part of the family unit. Slaves were seen as an important part of the family's reputation, especially in Hellenistic and Roman times, and slave companions for a woman were seen as a manifestation and protection of a woman's honor. As time progressed, domestic slavery became more prominent, and domestic slaves, usually working as an assistant to the wife of the patriarch, allowed larger houses to run more smoothly and efficiently.

Slaves had rights including protection from abuse, could own possessions, had opportunities for redemption and freedom; partly extending from God freeing his people from slavery in Egypt. Compared to neighboring societies, biblical laws had humanitarian elements and treated bonded individuals as persons, including encoding asylum for foreign fugitive slaves into law. According to Hector Avalos, the laws were ethnic based, gendered, and varied depending on the origin and social status of those enslaved.

== Slavery in antiquity ==
Slavery is an economic phenomenon and its history resides in the economic history of the ancient world. In the course of human history, slavery was a typical feature of civilization, predated written records, and existed in most societies throughout human history. Though there is no consensus on what a slave was or on how the institution of slavery should be defined, some characteristics can be used. Two types of slavery have been common throughout all human history: domestic and productive slaves. Slaves performed a variety of tasks. To determine what a slave's task was, many scholars look at repetitive descriptions which are contained in texts that were written around the same time and they also look at well-documented reports about other cultures which were written by authors who were raised in the Greco-Roman culture. One of the main functions of slaves was to serve as status symbols for the upper members of society, especially when it came to the acquisition of dowries for their daughters. These slaves could be sold or given away as needed, and they also showed that the family was capable of providing generous amounts of money to their daughters when they were married off. They also catered to the needs of the temple and they performed more domestic tasks such as keeping up the household, raising farm animals and growing small amounts of crops. Masters frequently took advantage of their slaves who were at their beck and call by requiring them to perform duties in public that the master had the ability to do himself. This showed a level of luxury which extended from the private sphere to the public sphere. In addition to showing luxury, the possession of slaves was necessary for a good family background, and many wealthy men viewed their colleagues who only possessed a few slaves as the type of individual who needed to be pitied.

== Old Testament ==
In ancient near east and Israel, some sources of slaves were due to debt and criminality. It was also possible to be born into slavery. If a male Israelite slave had been given a wife by his owner, then the wife and any children which had resulted from the union would remain the property of his owner, according to the Covenant Code. Although no nationality is specified, 18th-century theologians John Gill (1697–1771) and Adam Clarke suggested this referred only to Canaanite concubines.

=== War captives ===
The Israelites did not generally get involved in distant or large-scale wars, and apparently capture was not a significant source of slaves.

The enslavement of female captives is encouraged by Moses in Numbers 31. After being instructed by God to take vengeance upon the Midianites, Moses tells the Israelites to kill the male children and non-virgin females, but take the young virgins for themselves. Ken Brown claims that the army did not receive a direct instruction to take the virgin girls captive from YHWH, and therefore this action cannot be justified as obedience of a divine order; instead, the Israelites enslaved the virgin women on their own initiative.

In the Deuteronomic Code, when Israelites go to war with far away cities, but they surrendered to the Israelites, the residents within were required to serve the Israelites as tributaries. However, if they reject the terms of surrender, all of the men would be killed and all of the women, children, livestock and everything inside the cities would be considered spoils of war.

If the soldier desired to marry a captured foreigner, he was required to take her to his house, shave her head, pare her nails, (Note: The phrase pare her nails is the interpretive translation used in most English texts. However, in Hebrew classical writings, the sense is literally to grow out her nails without cropping them. This interpretation follows the Aramaic Targum on Deuteronomy 21:12, Maimonides (Hil. Melekhim 8:1–3), Rashi's commentary on Deuteronomy 21:12, as well as the author of Sefer ha-Chinuch (no. 532), unlike the popular English translations for the same verse.) and discard her captive's garb. She would remain in his house for an entire month, mourning the loss of her father and mother, after that, he could go in to see her and become her husband, and she could become his wife. If he later wished to end the relationship, he could not sell her into slavery.

Harold C. Washington cites Deuteronomy 21:10–14 as an example of how the Bible condones acts of sexual violence which are committed by Israelites; they were taking advantage of women who, as war captives, had no recourse or means of self defense. M. I. Rey argues that the passage is an endorsement of sexual slavery and genocidal rape, because the capture of these women is justified on the ground that they are not Hebrew. Rey also argues that these women were not considered the equals of Hebrew women, instead, they were considered war trophies, and thus, their captors had no qualms which would have prevented them from engaging in acts of sexual violence.

According to many Jewish commentators, the laws which regulate the treatment of female captives are not intended to encourage the capture and forced marriage of women, instead, they view it as inevitable in wartime and they also seek to minimize the occurrence and brutality of it. Kiddushin 22a; Rashi: Deuteronomy 21:11. ("The Torah only spoke to oppose the evil inclination: If [God] did not permit her, he would take her in violation of the law".)

=== Debt slavery ===
Debt slaves were one of the two categories of slaves in ancient Jewish society. As the name implies, these individuals sold themselves into slavery in order to pay off debts they may have accrued. These individuals were not permanently in this situation and were usually released after six to seven years. Chattel slaves, on the other hand, were less common and were usually prisoners of war who retained no individual right of redemption. These chattel slaves engaged in full-time menial labor, often in a domestic capacity.

Like the rest of the Ancient Near East, the legal systems of the Israelites divided slaves into different categories: "In determining who should benefit from their intervention, the legal systems drew two important distinctions: between debt and chattel slaves, and between native and foreign slaves. The authorities intervened first and foremost to protect the former category of each—citizens who had fallen on hard times and had been forced into slavery by debt or famine."

Poverty, and more generally a lack of economic security, compelled some people to enter debt bondage. In the Ancient Near East, wives and (non-adult) children were dependents of the head of household and were sometimes sold into slavery by the husband or father for financial reasons. Evidence of this viewpoint is found in the Code of Hammurabi, which permits debtors to sell their wives and children into temporary slavery, lasting a maximum of three years. Biblical authors repeatedly criticize debt slavery, which could be attributed to high taxation, monopoly of resources, high-interest loans, and collapse of higher kinship groups.

The earlier Covenant Code instructs that, if a thief is caught after sunrise and is unable to make restitution for the theft, then the thief should be enslaved.

=== Sexual and conjugal slavery ===
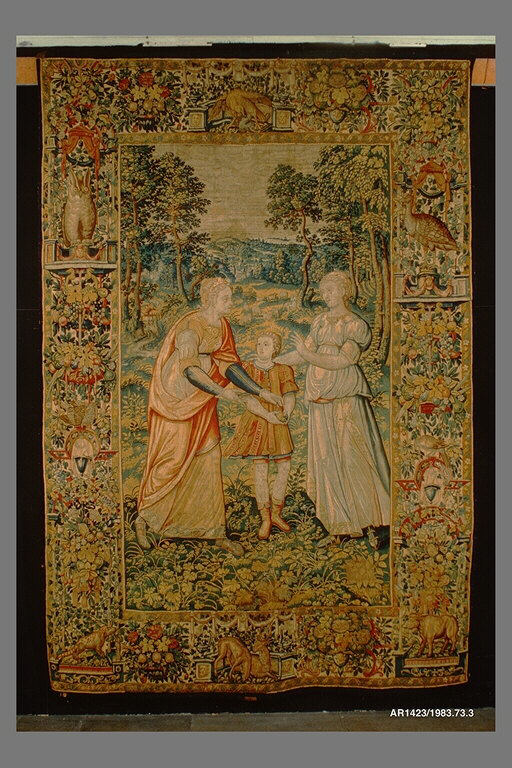
Tapestry depicting Rachel, Dan and Bilhah. Jacob was Rachel's husband, and Bilhah was Rachel's handmaid; Rachel gives Bilhah to her husband and he has two sons by Bilhah: Dan and Naphtali.

There were two words used for female slaves, which were amah (אָמָה) and shifhah (שִׁפְחָה). Based upon the uses in different texts, the words appear to have the same connotations and are used synonymously, namely that of being a sexual object, though the words themselves appear to be from different ethnic origins. Men assigned their female slaves the same level of dependence as they would a wife. Close levels of relationships could occur given the amount of dependence placed upon these women. These slaves had two specific roles: a sexual use and companionship. Their reproductive capacities were valued within their roles within the family. Marriage with these slaves was not unheard of or prohibited. In fact, it was a man's concubine that was seen as the "other" and shunned from the family structure. These female slaves were treated more like women of the family than other slaves which may have been because of, according to some scholars, their sexual role, which was particularly to "breed" more slaves.

Sexual slavery, or being sold to be a wife was common in the ancient world. Throughout the Old Testament, the taking of multiple wives is recorded many times. An Israelite father could sell his unmarried daughters into servitude, with the expectation or understanding that the master or his son could eventually marry her (as in Exodus 21:7–11.) It is understood by Jewish and Christian commentators that this referred to the sale of a daughter, who "is not arrived to the age of twelve years and a day, and this through poverty."

The code also instructs that the woman was allowed to be redeemed if the man broke his betrothal to her. If a female slave was betrothed to the master's son, then she had to be treated as a normal daughter. If he took another wife, then he was required to continue supplying the same amounts of food, clothing, and conjugal rights to her. The code states that failure to comply with these regulations would automatically grant free manumission to the enslaved woman, while all Israelite slaves were to be treated as hired servants.

The betrothal clause seems to have provided an exception to the law of release in Deuteronomy 15:12 (cf. Jeremiah 34:14), in which both male and female Israelite servants were to be given release in the seventh year.

The penalty if an Israelite engaged in sexual activity with an unredeemed female slave who was betrothed was referred to as scourging, with Jewish tradition seeing this as only referring to the slave, (versus Deuteronomy 22:22, where both parties were stoned, being free persons), as well as the man confessing his guilt and the priest making atonement for his sin.

=== Permanent enslavement ===
As for Israelite slaves, the Covenant Code allows them to voluntarily renounce their seventh-year manumission and become permanent slaves. The Law require that the slaves confirmed this desire "before God", a phrase which has been understood to mean at either a religious sanctuary, before judges, or in the presence of household gods. Having done this, slaves were then to have an awl driven through their ear into a doorpost by their master. This ritual was common throughout the Ancient Near East, being practiced by Mesopotamians, Lydians, and Arabs; in the Semitic world, the ear symbolised obedience (much as the heart symbolises emotion, in the modern western world), and a pierced earlobe signified servitude.

=== Slave trade ===
Exodus 21:16 establishes a death sentence for any man who steals, or kidnaps, another man. In the Holiness code of Leviticus, the Israelites were allowed to buy non-Israelites as property that could be inherited. In context, it addressed the dilemma on who should become slaves if Israelites were excluded, including those that sold themselves due to poverty. Isaac S. D. Sassoon argued that it was a compromise between anti-slavery commoners and pro-slavery landowners in Israel but states that the Hebrew Bible still approves of the heavy regulation and eventual abolition of slavery, regardless of form.

Some believe that the non-Israelites refer to neighboring Gentile nations, except for Canaanites who were doomed to destruction, foreigners who refused to join Israel and unbelievers since Israelites were "children of Abraham by faith". Others believe that Deuteronomy indirectly helped non-Israelite slaves become Israelite because they were required to rest on Shabbat and participate in Temple and holiday celebrations. However, foreign slaves were banned from celebrating Passover unless they circumcised, which made them equivalent to the native-born Israelite (Exodus 12:48). Deuteronomy further describes all non-Israelite laborers as being parties to God's covenant as members of the Israelite community although this contentious (Deuteronomy 29:9). Saul Olyan also argued that non-Israelites, regardless of background, automatically became Israelite if they lived in their territory (Ezekiel 47:21–23), reflecting early Israelite practices.

=== Protection and compensation ===
Slaves in the Old Testament had rights including protection from abuse, ability to own their own possessions, opportunities for redemption and freedom; partly extending from God freeing his people from slavery in Egypt. Compared to neighboring societies, biblical laws had humanitarian elements and treated bonded individuals as persons stemming from being made in the image of God. The earlier Covenant Code provides a potentially more valuable and direct form of relief, namely a degree of protection for the slave's person (their body and its health) itself. This codification extends the basic "eye for an eye" notion to compel that when slaves are significantly injured by their masters, manumission is to be the compensation given; the canonical examples mentioned are the knocking out of an eye or a tooth. This resembles the earlier Code of Hammurabi, which instructs that when an injury is done to a social inferior, monetary compensation should be made, instead of carrying out the basic "eye for an eye" punishment; Josephus indicates that by his time it was acceptable for a fine to be paid to the slave, instead of manumitting them, if the slave agreed. Nachmanides argued that it was a biblically commanded duty to liberate a slave who had been harmed in this way.

The Hittite laws and the Code of Hammurabi both insist that if a slave is harmed by a third party, the third party must financially compensate the owner. In the Covenant Code, if an ox gores a slave, the ox owner must pay the servant's master a 30 shekel fine.

The murder of slaves by owners was prohibited in the Law covenant. The Covenant Code clearly institutes the death penalty for beating a free man to death; in contrast, beating a slave to death was to be "avenged" only if the slave does not survive for "one or two days" after the beating. Abraham ben Nathan of Lunel, a 12th-century Provençal scholar, Targum, and Maimonides argue that "avenged" implies the death penalty, but more recent scholars view it as probably describing a lesser punishment. A number of modern Protestant Bible versions (such as the New Living Translation, New International Version and New Century Version) translate the survival for "one or two days" as referring to a full and speedy recovery, rather than to a lingering death, as favoured by other recent versions (such as the New Revised Standard Version and New American Bible).

==== Labor and rest ====
The Ten Commandments make clear that honouring the Shabbat, the day of rest, applied to slaves and also their masters. The later book of Deuteronomy, having repeated the Shabbat requirement, also instructs that slaves should be allowed to celebrate the Sukkot festival.

Leviticus instructs that during the Sabbatical Year, slaves and their masters should eat food which the land yields, without being farmed. This commandment not to work the land is directed at the landowner and does not mention slaves, but other verses imply that no produce is sown by anyone in this year, and command that the land must "lie fallow". It is not mentioned whether slaves receive rest from non-agricultural work during this year.

Unlike the other books, Leviticus does not mention the freeing of Israelite slaves after six years, instead simply giving the vague instruction that Israelite slaves should not be compelled to work with rigour; Maimonides argues that this was to be interpreted as forbidding open-ended work (such as keep doing that until I come back), and that disciplinary action was not to include instructing the slave to perform otherwise pointless work.

A special case is that of the debtor who sells himself as a slave to his creditor; Leviticus instructs that in this situation, the debtor must not be made to do the work of slaves, but must instead be treated the same as a hired servant. In Jewish tradition, this was taken to mean that the debtor should not be instructed to do humiliating work—which only slaves would do—and that the debtor should be asked to perform the craft(s) which they usually did before they had been enslaved, if it is realistic to do so.

=== Manumission and provision ===
Since Israel was mainly fugitive slaves from Egypt, the very first laws from the Covenant code emphasize manumission, the releasing from slavery, and is the only ancient law collection to begin with this. This is noted by scholars of human rights to be an early ethical contribution. The scope of Israel's manumission laws included owners not sending released slaves empty handed and had to provide material provisions to prevent them from being in the same circumstances that had led them into servitude. In a parallel with the shmita system the Covenant Code prescribes automatic manumission of male Israelite slaves after they have worked for six years; this excludes non-Israelite slaves, and specifically excludes Israelite daughters, who were sold into slavery by their fathers, from such automatic seventh-year manumission. Such were bought to be betrothed to the owner, or his son, and if that had not been done, they were to be allowed to be redeemed. If the marriage took place, they were to be set free if her husband was negligent in his basic marital obligations. The later Deuteronomic Code is seen by some to contradict elements of this instruction, in extending automatic seventh year manumission to both sexes.

The Deuteronomic Code also extends the seventh-year manumission rule by instructing that Israelite slaves freed in this way should be given livestock, grain, and wine as a parting gift; the literal meaning of the verb used, at this point in the text, for giving this gift seems to be hang round the neck. The Gift is described in The 1901 Jewish Encyclopedia as representing a gift of produce rather than of money or clothing; many Jewish scholars estimated that the value of the three listed products was about 30 shekels, so the gift gradually came to be standardised as produce worth this fixed value. The Bible states that one should not regret freeing the Slave, for slaves were worth Twice the Hired hand to The Master; Nachmanides enumerates this as a command rather than merely as a piece of advice.

According to Jeremiah 34:8–24, Jeremiah also demanded that King Zedekiah manumit (free) all Israelite slaves (Jeremiah 34:9). Leviticus does not mention seventh-year manumission; instead it only instructs that debt-slaves, and Israelite slaves owned by foreign residents, should be freed during the national Jubilee (occurring either every 49 or every 50 years, depending on interpretation).

While many commentators see the Holiness Code regulations as supplementing the prior legislation mandating manumission in the seventh year, the otherwise potentially long wait until the Jubilee was somewhat alleviated by the Holiness Code, with the instruction that slaves should be allowed to buy their freedom by paying an amount equal to the total wages of a hired servant over the entire period remaining until the next Jubilee (this could be up to 49 years-worth of wages). Blood relatives of the slave were also allowed to buy the slave's freedom, and this became regarded as a duty to be carried out by the next of kin (Hebrew: Go'el).

In the Old Testament, the differences between male and female enslavement were vast. Deuteronomic code applied mostly to men, while women could be subjected to a much different type of slavery. This change in status would require a female debt slave to become a permanent fixture of the household by way of marrying the father or the father's son. Deuteronomy 21:9 states that the female slave must be treated as a daughter if such permanent status is to be established.

==== Fugitive slaves ====
The Deuteronomic Code forbids the Israelites from handing over fugitive slaves to their masters or oppressing them, and instructs that these fugitives should be allowed to reside where they wish. The fugitive slave law in Deuteronomy was unique since it granted asylum to foreign slaves coming into Israel, whereas other societies in the ancient near east required allies to return foreign slaves. Although a literal reading would indicate that this applies to slaves of all nationalities and locations, the Mishnah and many commentators consider the rule to have the much narrower application, to just those slaves who flee from outside Israelite territory into it.

=== Abolition of slavery ===
According to The Jewish Encyclopedia, the slavery of Israelites was abolished by the prophets after the destruction of the Temple of Solomon. The prophet Nehemiah rebuked the wealthy Israelites of his day for continuing to own Israelite slaves.

== New Testament ==
=== Gospels ===
The Bible says that Jesus healed the ill slave of a centurion and restored the cut off ear of the high priest's slave. In his parables, Jesus referenced slavery: the prodigal son, ten gold coins, unforgiving servant, and tenant farmers. Jesus also taught that he would give burdened and weary laborers rest, as well as that he came to "proclaim liberty to captives" and "to let the oppressed go free". (Luke 4:18) The Passion narratives are interpreted by the Catholic Church as a fulfillment of the Suffering Servant songs in Isaiah.

=== Epistles ===
In the Epistle to the Ephesians, the author motivates early Christian slaves to remain loyal and obedient to their masters like they are to Christ. In Ephesians 6:5–8, the author states "Slaves, be obedient to your human masters with fear and trembling, in sincerity of heart, as to Christ." Andrew T. Lincoln comments that the next verse in Ephesians where the author instructs masters to "do the same" to their slaves, refers to "having a corresponding attitude to that required of the slaves, namely, making their service of the one heavenly Master determinative for their actions. Both masters and slaves have the same Lord, and therefore, both have the same standard of conduct in their relationship to each other". Similar statements regarding obedient slaves can be found in Colossians 3:22–24, 1 Timothy 6:1–2, and Titus 2:9–10. In Col 4:1, the author advises members of the church, who are slave masters, to "treat your slaves justly and fairly, realizing that you too have a Master in heaven." Adding to the author's advice to masters and slaves, he uses slavery as a metaphor. In Romans 1:1, Paul calls himself "a slave of Christ Jesus" and later in Romans 6:18, Paul writes "You have been set free from sin and become slaves to righteousness." Also in Galatians, Paul writes on the nature of slavery within the kingdom of God. Galatians 3:28 states: "There is neither Jew nor Greek, there is neither slave nor free, there is neither male nor female; for you are all one in Christ Jesus." Similar patterns of speech and understanding about slavery are found in epistles traditionally attributed to Peter. In 1 Peter 2:18, the author writes "Slaves, be subject to your masters with all reverence, not only to those who are good and equitable but also to those who are perverse." In 1 Timothy 1:10, the author condemns the sexually immoral, abusers of themselves with mankind, liars, perjurers, those that kidnap innocents and sell them into slavery, and whatever else is contrary to sound doctrine.

=== Philemon ===
The Epistle to Philemon has become an important text in regard to slavery; it was used by pro-slavery advocates as well as by abolitionists. In the epistle, Saint Paul writes to Saint Philemon that he is returning Saint Onesimus, a fugitive slave, back to him; however, Paul also entreats Philemon to regard Onesimus, who he says he views as a son, not as a slave but as a beloved brother in Christ. Philemon is requested to treat Onesimus as he would treat Paul. According to Catholic tradition, Philemon freed Onesimus.

=== Manumission ===
The prospect of manumission is an idea prevalent within the New Testament. In contrast to the Old Testament, the New Testament's criteria for manumission encompasses Roman laws on slavery as opposed to the shmita system. Manumission within the Roman system largely depends on the mode of enslavement: slaves were often foreigners, prisoners of war, or those heavily indebted. For foreign-born individuals, manumission was increasingly amorphous; however, if subject to debt slavery, manumission was much more concrete: freedom was granted once the debt was paid. Children were often offered to creditors as a form of payment and their manumission was determined ab initio (at the outset) with the pater (family head). This manicipia (enslavement) of children by the pater did not exclude the selling of children into sexual slavery. If sold into sex slavery, the prospect of complete manumission became much less likely under the stipulations of Roman Law. Being sold into sexual slavery meant greater chance of perpetual servitude, by way of explicit enslavement or forced marriage.

One of the first discussions of manumission in the New Testament can be seen in Paul's interaction with Philemon's slave Onesimus. Onesimus was held captive with Paul, as he was a fugitive, run-away slave. Paul proceeds to baptize the slave Onesimus, and then writes to his owner, Philemon, telling him that he will pay whatever fee Onesimus owes for his fugitive status. Paul does not explicitly ask Philemon for Onesimus's manumission; however, the offer to pay a "fee" for Onesimus's escape has been discussed as a possible latent form of manumission. Paul's treatment of Onesimus additionally brings into question of Roman slavery as a "closed" or "open" slave system. Open slave systems allow for incorporation of freed slaves into society after manumission, while closed systems manumitted slaves still lack social agency or social integration. Roman slavery exhibited characteristics of both, open and closed, systems which further complicates the letter from Paul to Philemon regarding the slave Onesimus.

In the time of the New Testament, there were three modes in which a slave could be manumitted by his or her master: a will could include a formal permission of manumission, a slave could be declared free during a census, or a slave and master could go before a provincial official. These modes of manumission lend evidence to suggest that manumission was an everyday occurrence, and thus complicates New Testament texts encouraging manumission. In 1 Corinthians 7:21, Paul encourages enslaved peoples to pursue manumission; however, this manumission could be connoted in the boundaries of a closed slave system in which manumission does not equate to complete freedom. Modes of manumission, in the New Testament, are once again disputed in a letter from Paul to Galatians in which Paul writes "For freedom Christ has set us free."

=== Book of Revelation ===
Revelation 18 lists enslaved people as one of the "excessive luxuries" of "Babylon the Great" which it says will fall when God judges its "sins" and "crimes".

== The term slave and Bible translations ==
Translators of the Bible have to contend with readers not knowing the details of ancient slavery, as well as its points of difference with the modern and harshly negative implications of the term slave. There is no Hebrew word for slave, leading to ambiguity in reading passages. The Hebrew term 'ebed is usually used for slave or bondsman (fellow Jews controlled for a period of time in a state closer to indentured servitude), but it can also refer to servants. For example, Naaman the Aramean is referred to in 2 Kings 5 as an 'ebed, yet is clearly a person of high status and rank.

The Greek term doulos (δοῦλος) more directly refers to slaves (diakonos is a separate word for 'servant'); however, the Septuagint frequently translates the Hebrew 'ebed to Greek doulos in senses where the original meant 'servant', leaving the meaning unclear.

More generally, favored slaves in antiquity could receive some of the status of their owners, could accumulate wealth and property, hold their own slaves, and so on. Thus, the slave of someone sufficiently exalted – such as the slave of a king or emperor – could well have a social status higher than a common free man; Paul's introduction of himself in Romans 1:1 as a doulos of Jesus Christ was probably not meant to be quite as humble as a modern English interpretation of being a slave would be. These considerations mean that most translations tend to favor using 'servant' and equivalents in other languages, although some translations will have a footnote that the interpretavely translated Greek word is literally 'slave'.

== Historical reception ==
The earliest elaboration of abolition that survives from antiquity is Gregory of Nyssa's sermon on owning slaves and pride (380 AD), anticipating the moral groundwork of the abolitionist movement by nearly 1,500 years. Early Christians like Saint Augustine described slavery as being against God's intention and resulting from sin. Pope Callixtus I (bishop of Rome 218–222) was a slave in his youth. Slavery decreased with multiple abolition movements in the late 5th century. James W. Watts argued that Hellenistic culture and Roman law played a more significant role than the Bible in late antique and medieval Jewish and Christian slave-owning practices. In the early modern period, mercantilism was another factor, with John Calvin declaring that "economic circumstances rendered the biblical laws redundant". Nonetheless, pro-slavery Europeans defined the "non-Israelites" of Leviticus 25:44-46 as non-Christians and later as non-white people. Watts suggested that they used the Bible's two-tier model to justify enslaving Africans and Native Americans while limiting white forced laborers to indentured servants and prisoners.

In the debate over slavery in Britain and the United States in the late eighteenth and early nineteenth centuries, both supporters of slavery and abolitionists cited the Bible as support for their views. The Curse of Ham (Genesis 9:18–27) was a passage particularly used by some slave owners to justify their enslavement of black people. This justification has been criticised extensively by Christian theologians as a misinterpretation. The Epistle to Philemon was also used as evidence by both sides of the debate. It is commonly suggested that Biblical slavery and early Christian slavery was less brutal than modern slavery (as compared with the African slave trade), however according to Chance Bonar, this is a faulty assumption, and there is ample historical evidence for extreme cruelty in ancient Mediterranean slavery, including that practiced by early Christians.

During the Enlightenment, both religious and nonreligious individuals held diverse and complex views about natural rights, scientific racism, slavery, and the Bible; but did not result in the abolishment of the institution. It the 19th century, abolitionists and defenders of slavery in the United States still debated the Bible's message on the topic. Abolitionists cited both the Old and New Testaments to argue for manumission, and against kidnapping or "stealing men" to own or sell them as slaves, while pro-slavery pastors used biblical texts to legitimize the institution of slavery. It was Christian groups that took a hard stand against slavery as an institution and pushed for abolition in Britain and America because secular government protected slavery. Believing that, "slavery was contrary to the ethics of Jesus", Christian congregations and church clergy, especially in the Northern United States, played a role in the Underground Railroad to help free people trapped in slavery, especially Christians of the Wesleyan Methodist, Quaker and Congregationalist denominations.

== See also ==
- The Bible and violence
- Curse and mark of Cain
- History of Christian thought on persecution and tolerance
- Select Parts of the Holy Bible for the use of the Negro Slaves in the British West-India Islands – 1807 Bible intended to be read by slaves
- Christian views on slavery
  - Catholic Church and slavery
  - Mormonism and slavery
- Islamic views on slavery
- Jewish views on slavery
