= Michael Fishbane =

American scholar (born 1943)

Michael A. Fishbane (born 1943) is an American scholar of Judaism and rabbinic literature. Formerly at Brandeis University, he is currently the Nathan Cummings Distinguished Professor Emeritus of Jewish Studies at the Divinity School, University of Chicago.

Fishbane joined the University of Chicago in 1990, following approximately twenty-five years as a student and faculty member at Brandeis University. He subsequently relocated to Teaneck, New Jersey, to be closer to his family, including his son Eitan Fishbane, a professor of Jewish thought at the Jewish Theological Seminary, and another son, Elisha, who resides in Highland Park.

Fishbane (Ph.D., Brandeis University) is well known as a Hebrew Bible scholar, especially for his work Biblical Interpretation in Ancient Israel and his work on the JPS Tanakh. He has also written on the subjects of Midrash, mysticism, myth and Jewish theology. In 2015, Fishbane published a multileveled comprehensive commentary presenting the full range of Jewish interpretations on the Song of Songs (Jewish Publication Society).

He has received the Lifetime Achievement in Textual Studies award from the National Foundation For Jewish Culture.

Fishbane also undertook a project funded by the Templeton Foundation to compile a collection of Hasidic spiritual practices drawn from sermons, homilies, and disciples' records, with the aim of documenting both the physical and contemplative disciplines cultivated within Hasidic thought over the preceding two and a half centuries.

== Bibliography ==
- Biblical Interpretation in Ancient Israel, (Oxford Clarendon Press, 1985.)
- Garments of Torah: Essays in Biblical Hermeneutics, (Indiana University Press, 1989.)
- The Kiss of God: Spiritual and Mystical Death in Judaism, (University of Washington Press, 1994.)
- The Exegetical Imagination: On Jewish Thought and Theology, (Harvard University Press, 1998.)
- Biblical Text and Texture: A Literary Reading of Selected Texts, (Oneworld Publications, 1998.)
- The JPS Bible Commentary: Haftarot, (Jewish Publication Society, 2002.)
- Biblical Myth and Rabbinic Mythmaking, (Oxford University Press, 2003.)
- Sacred Attunement: A Jewish Theology, (University of Chicago Press, 2007.)
- The JPS Bible Commentary: Song of Songs, (Jewish Publication Society, 2015)
- Fragile Finitude: A Jewish Hermeneutical Theology, (University of Chicago Press, 2021)

== Awards ==
- 1986: National Jewish Book Award Scholarship for Biblical Interpretation in Ancient Israel
- 1994: National Jewish Book Award in the Jewish Thought category for The Kiss of God: Spiritual and Mystical Death in Judaism

== Sources ==
- Faculty page at the University of Chicago Divinity School
- Garber, Zev (2007). "Fishbane, Michael". In Skolnik, Fred (ed.). Encyclopedia Judaica. Vol. 7 (2nd. ed.). Detroit: Macmillan. pp. 59–60. ISBN 978-0-02-865935-0.
