= List of winners of the National Jewish Book Award =

This is a list of the winners of the National Jewish Book Award by category. The awards were established in 1950 to recognize outstanding Jewish Literature. They are awarded by the Jewish Book Council, a New-York based non-profit organization dedicated to the support and promotion of Jewish literature since 1944.

== American Jewish History ==
The awards in the American Jewish History category, Celebrate 350, are presented to authors or editors of non-fiction books about the Jewish experience in North America.

American Jewish History Award winners
Year	Title	Author	Ref.
2005	The Chosen: The Hidden History of Admission and Exclusion at Harvard, Yale, and Princeton	Jerome Karabel	
2006	Emma Lazarus	Esther Schor	
2007	Spiritual Radical: Abraham Joshua Heschel in America, 1940-1972	Edward K. Kaplan	
2008	Exiles on Main Street: Jewish American Writers and American Literary Culture	Julian Levinson	
2009	We Remember with Reverence and Love: American Jews and the Myth of Silence after the Holocaust, 1945-1962	Hasia R. Diner	
2010	The Rebbe: The Life and Afterlife of Menachem Mendel Schneerson	Samuel Heilman	
2011	The Benderly Boys and American Jewish Education	Jonathan B. Krasner	
2012	Messianism, Secrecy and Mysticism: A New Interpretation of Early American Jewish Life	Laura Arnold Leibman	
2013	FDR and the Jews	Richard Breitman and Allan J. Lichtman	
2014	The Rag Race: How Jews Sewed Their Way to Success in America and the British Empire	Adam D. Mendelsohn	
2015	Beyond Sectarianism: The Realignment of American Orthodox Judaism	Adam S. Ferziger	
2016	Kosher USA: How Coke Became Kosher and Other Tales of Modern Food	Roger Horowitz	
2017	Jews on the Frontier: Religion and Mobility in Nineteenth-Century America	Shari Rabin	
2018	The New American Judaism: How Jews Practice Their Religion Today	Jack Wertheimer	
2019	The Foundations of American Jewish Liberalism	Kenneth D. Wald	
2020	The Art of the Jewish Family: A History of Women in Early New York in Five Objects	Laura Arnold Leibman	
2021	A Fortress in Brooklyn: Race, Real Estate, and the Making of Hasidic Williamsburg	Nathaniel Deutsch and Michael Casper	
2022	American Shtetl: The Making of Kiryas Joel, a Hasidic Village in Upstate New York	Nomi M. Stolzenberg and David N. Myers	
2023	Walkers in the City: Jewish Street Photographers of Midcentury New York	Deborah Dash Moore	
2024	A Cold War Exodus: How American Activists Mobilized to Free Soviet Jews	Shaul Kelner	
2025	Antisemitism, an American Tradition	Pamela S. Nadell	

== Anthologies and Collections ==
The awards in the Anthologies and Collections category are presented to editors of books of essays, biographies, short stories, or other collected works by one or more authors. The National Jewish Book Award in the Anthologies and Collections category was not awarded in 2014, 2017, 2018 and there was only one winner for the 2002-2003 period.

Anthologies and Collections award winners
Year	Title	Author	Ref.
2002 - 2003	Cultures of the Jews: A New History	David Biale	
2004	I Am Jewish: Personal Reflections Inspired by the Last Words of Daniel Pearl	Judea Pearl	
2005	Who We Are: On Being (and Not Being) a Jewish American Writer	Derek Rubin	
2006	Writing a Modern Jewish History: Essays in Honor of Salo W. Baron	Barbara Kirshenblatt-Gimblett	
2007	Antisemitism: The Generic Hatred: Essays in Memory of Simon Wiesenthal	Michael Fineberg	
2009	Rethinking European Jewish History	Jeremy Cohen	
2010	The Cambridge Guide to Jewish History, Religion, and Culture	Judith Reesa Baskin	
2011	Gender and Jewish History	Marion A. Kaplan	
2012	Jewish Jocks: An Unorthodox Hall of Fame	Franklin Foer	
2013	1929: Mapping the Jewish World	Hasia R. Diner	
2015	Dear Mendl, Dear Reyzl: Yiddish Letter Manuals from Russia and America	Alice Nakhimovsky	
2016	Makers of Jewish Modernity: Thinkers, Artists, Leaders, and the World They Made	Jacques Picard	
2019	What We Talk about When We Talk about Hebrew	Naomi B. Sokoloff and Nancy E. Berg	

== Autobiography and Memoir ==
The awards in the Autobiography and Memoir category, the Krauss Family Awards in Memory of Simon & Shulamith (Sofi) Goldberg, are presented to authors of a family history, autobiography, personal memoir either of a Jew or family of being significantly related to the Jewish experience. There was no winner of the National Jewish Book Award in the Autobiography and Memoir category for 1987, 1988, 2002 to 2006.

Autobiography and Memoir award winners
Year	Title	Author	Ref.
1984	Ben-Gurion: Prophet of Fire	Dan Kurzman	
1985	Martin Buber's Life and Work: The Later Years, 1945-1965	Maurice Friedman	
1986	Chaim Weizmann, The Making of a Zionist Leader	Jehuda Reinharz	
1989	Fear No Evil	Natan Sharansky	
1990	From That Place and Time: A Memoir, 1938-1947	Lucy S. Dawidowicz	
1991	Daydreams and Nightmares: Reflections on a Harlem Childhood	Irving Louis Horowitz	
1992	Mostly Morganthaus: A Family History	Henry Morgenthau III	
1993	On Clowns: The Dictator and the Artist	Norman Manea	
1994	A Spy in Canaan: My Life As a Jewish-American Businessman Spying for Israel in Arab Lands	Howard H. Schack	
1995	In This Dark House: A Memoir	Louise Kehoe	
1996	Fragments: Memories of a Wartime Childhood	Binjamin Wilkomirski	
1997	Miriam's Kitchen: A Memoir	Elizabeth Ehrlich	
1998	Jacob, Menachem und Mimoun. Ein Familienepos	Marcel Bénabou	
1999	King David's Harp: Autobiographical Essays by Jewish Latin American Writers	Stephen A. Sadow	
2000	A Scholar's Odyssey	Cyrus H. Gordon	
2001	The Rebbe's Daughter	Malkah Shapiro	
2007	A Guest in My Own Country: A Hungarian Life	George Konrad	
2008	Marie Syrkin: Values Beyond the Self	Carole S. Kessner	
2009	The Fall of a Sparrow: The Life and Times of Abba Kovner	Dina Porat	
2010	The Man On Devil’s Island	Ruth Harris	
2011	MetaMaus: A Look Inside a Modern Classic, Maus	Art Spiegelman	
2012	Howard Fast: Life and Literature in the Left Lane	Gerald Sorin	
2013	An American Bride in Kabul: A Memoir	Phyllis Chesler	
2014	The Impossible Exile: Stefan Zweig at the End of the World	George Prochnik	
2015	After the Holocaust the Bells Still Ring	Joseph Polak	
2016	But You Did Not Come Back: A Memoir	Marceline Loridan-Ivens	
2017	The Choice	Edith Eger	
2018	My Country, My Life: Fighting for Israel, Searching for Peace	Ehud Barak	
2019	Inheritance: A Memoir of Genealogy, Paternity, and Love	Dani Shapiro	
2020	When Time Stopped: A Memoir of My Father’s War and What Remains	Ariana Neumann	
2021	The Empathy Diaries: A Memoir	Sherry Turkle	
2022	Chosen: A Memoir of Stolen Boyhood	Stephen Mills	
2023	Happily: A Personal History-with Fairy Tales	Sabrina Orah Mark	
2024	The Gates of Gaza: A Story of Betrayal, Survival and Hope on Israel’s Borderlands	Amir Tibon	
2025	Motherland: A Feminist History of Modern Russia, from Revolution to Autocracy	Julia Ioffe	

== Biography ==
The awards in the Biography category, In Memory of Sara Berenson Stone, are presented to authors of a biography that is significantly related to the Jewish experience. There were no winners of the National Jewish Book Award in the Biography category between 1986 and 2018.

Biography award winners
Year	Title	Author	Ref.
1984	Ben-Gurion: Prophet of Fire	Dan Kurzman	
1985	Martin Buber's Life and Work: The Later Years, 1945-1965	Maurice Friedman	
1986	Chaim Weizmann, The Making of a Zionist Leader	Jehuda Reinharz	
2018	Witness: Lessons from Elie Wiesel’s Classroom	Ariel Burger	
2019	Touched with Fire: Morris B. Abram and the Battle against Racial and Religious Discrimination	David E. Lowe	
2020	From Left to Right: Lucy S. Dawidowicz, the New York Intellectuals, and the Politics of Jewish History	Nancy Sinkoff	
2021	To Repair a Broken World: The Life of Henrietta Szold, Founder of Hadassah	Dvora Hacohen	
2022	The Escape Artist: The Man Who Broke Out of Auschwitz to Warn the World	Jonathan Freedland	
2023	Bruno Schulz: An Artist, a Murder, and the Hijacking of History	Benjamin Balint	
2024	Leonard Cohen: The Man Who Saw the Angels Fall	Christophe Lebold	
2025	The Prosecutor: One Man’s Battle to Bring Nazis to Justice	Jack Fairweather	

== Biography and Autobiography ==
Biography and Autobiography award winners
Year	Title	Author	Ref.
2005	Ester and Ruzya: How My Grandmothers Survived Hitler's War and Stalin's Peace	Masha Gessen	
2006	The Lost: A Search for Six of Six Million	Daniel Mendelsohn	

== Book Club Award ==
The awards in the Book Club Award category, the Miller Family Awards in Memory of Helen Dunn Weinstein and June Keit Miller, are presented to authors of an outstanding work of fiction or nonfiction that inspires meaningful conversation about Jewish life, identity, practice, or history.

Book Club Award winners
Year	Title	Author	Ref.
2016	And After the Fire	Lauren Belfer	
2017	The Weight of Ink	Rachel Kadish	
2018	The Girl from Berlin	Richard H. Balson	
2019	The World That We Knew	Alice Hoffman	
2020	The Lost Shtetl	Max Gross	
2021	The Hidden Palace	Helene Wecker	
2022	Shayna	Miriam Ruth Black	
2023	The Heaven and Earth Grocery Store	James McBride	
2024	The Last Dekrepitzer	Howard Langer	
2025	Dog	Yishay Ishi Ron, Yardenne Greenspan (trans.)	

== Children's and young adults' literature ==
Children's and young adults' literature award winners
Year	Title	Author	Ref.
2004	Wonders and Miracles: A Passover Companion	Eric A. Kimmel	
2005	Real Time	Pnina Moed Kass	
2006	The Book Thief	Markus Zusak	
2007	Homeland: The Illustrated History of the State of Israel	Marv Wolfman	
2008	The Diary of Laura's Twin	Kathy Kacer	
2009	The Other Half of Life: A Novel Based on the True Story of the MS St. Louis	Kim Ablon Whitney	
2010	Under a Red Sky: Memoir of a Childhood in Communist Romania	Haya Leah Molnar	
2011	Deadly	Julie Chibbaro	
2012	Meet at the Ark at Eight	Ulrich Hub	
2013	The War within These Walls	Aline Sax	
2014	Spinoza: The Outcast Thinker	Devra Lehmann	

== Children's Literature ==
The awards in the Children's Literature category are presented to authors (or editors) and illustrators of a Jewish-themed children book (age 0 to 11 years old). The name the awards were known by changed on several occasions over the years:

- 1952 - 1955: Issac Sigel Memorial Award
- 1958: Pioneer Women's Hayim Greenberg Memorial Award
- 1957 - 1967: Issac Sigel Memorial Award
- 1970 - 1980: Charles and Bertie G. Schwartz Juvenile Award
- 1981 - 1986: William (Zev) Frank Memorial Award Presented by Ellen and David Scheinfeld
- 1987 - 1991: Anita and Martin Shapolsky Award
- 1992: The Once Upon A Time Bookstore Award
- 1993 - 1994: The Barbara Cohen Memorial Award
- 1995 - 2019: No specific name for the award in the category

There was no National Jewish Book Award for the Children's Literature category in 1956, 1957, 1968, 1969 and for the years 2004 to 2014. In 1970, there were two winners of the National Jewish Book Award in the Children's Literature category and only one winner for the 2002-2003 period.

Children's Literature award winners
Year	Title	Author	Illustrator	Ref.
1952	All-of-a-Kind Family	Sydney Taylor	Helen John	
1953	Stories of King David	Lillian S. Freehof		
1954	The Jewish People: Book III	Deborah Pessin		
1958	The Junior Jewish Encyclopedia	Naomi Ben-Asher and Hayim Leaf		
1959	Border Hawk: August Bondi	Lloyd Alexander	Bernard Krigstein	
1960	Keys to a Magic Door: Isaac Leib Peretz	Sylvia Rothchild		
1961	Discovering Israel	Regina To		
1962	Ten and a Kid	Sadie Rose Weilerstein		
1963	Return to Freedom	Josephine Kamm		
1964	A Boy of Old Prague	Sulamith Ish-Kishor	Ben Shahn	
1965	Worlds Lost and Found: Discoveries in Biblical Archeology	Azriel Louis Eisenberg and Dov Peretz Elkins	Charles Pickard	
1966	The Dreyfus Affair	Betty Schechter		
1967	The Story of Israel	Meyer Levin		
1970	Martin Buber: Wisdom in Our Time; The Story of an Outstanding Jewish Thinker and Humanist	Charlie May Simon		
1970	The Story of Masadah, by Yigael Yadin: Retold for Young Readers	Gerald Gottlieb		
1971	Journey to America	Sonia Levitin	Charles Robinson	
1972	The Master of Miracle: A New Novel of the Golem	Sulamith Ish-Kishor	Arnold Lobel	
1973	The Upstairs Room	Johanna Reiss		
1974	Uncle Misha's Partisans	Yuri Suhl		
1975	The Holocaust: A History of Courage and Resistance	Bea Stadtler and Morrison David Bial	David S. Martin	
1976	Haym Salomon Liberty's Son	Shirley Gorson Milgrim		
1977	Rifka Grows Up	Chaya M. Burstein		
1978	Never to Forget: The Jews of the Holocaust	Milton Meltzer		
1980	Dita Saxova	Arnošt Lustig		
1981	A Russian Farewell	Leonard Everett Fisher		
1982	The Night Journey	Kathryn Lasky		
1983	King of the Seventh Grade	Barbara Cohen		
1984	The Jewish Kids Catalog	Chaya M. Burstein		
1985	Good If It Goes	Gary Provost and Gail Levine-Friedus		
1986	In Kindling Flame: The Story of Hannah Senesh, 1921-1944	Linda Atkinson		
1987	Monday in Odessa	Eileen Bluestone Sherman		
1988	The Return	Sonia Levitin		
1989	The Devil's Arithmetic	Jane Yolen		
1990	Number the Stars	Lois Lowry		
1991	Becoming Gershona	Nava Semel and Seymour Simckes (trans.)		
1992	The Man from the Other Side	Uri Orlev and Hillel Halkin, (trans.)		
1993	Letters from Rifka	Karen Hesse		
1994	Golden Windows and Other Stories of Jerusalem	Adèle Geras		
1995	Under the Domim Tree	Gila Almagor and Hillel Schenker		
1996	Next Year in Jerusalem: 3000 Years of Jewish Stories	Howard Schwartz		
1997	The Golem: A Version	Barbara Rogasky	Trina Schart Hyman	
1998	Heeding the Call: Jewish Voices in America's Civil Rights Struggle	Norman H. Finkelstein		
1999	With All My Heart, With All My Mind: Thirteen Stories About Growing Up Jewish	Sandy Asher (ed.)		
2000	The Day the Rabbi Disappeared: Jewish Holiday Tales of Magic	Howard Schwartz		
2001	Forged in Freedom: Shaping the Jewish-American Experience	Norman H. Finkelstein		
2002-2003	Jewish Holidays All Year Round: A Family Treasury	Ilene Cooper	Elivia Savadier	
2015	Oskar and the Eight Blessings	Tanya Simon and Richard Simon	Mark Siegel	
2016	I Dissent: Ruth Bader Ginsburg Makes Her Mark	Debbie Levy	Elizabeth Baddeley	
2017	The Language of Angels	Richard Michelson	Karla Gudeon	
2018	All Three Stooges	Erica S. Perl		
2019	Gittel’s Journey: An Ellis Island Story	Lesléa Newman	Amy June Bates	

== Children's picture book ==
The awards in the Children's Picture Book category are presented to authors and illustrators. The award was known as the Marcia and Louis Posner Awardfrom 1989 to 1993 and as Louis Posner Memorial Award from 1994 to 2001 There were no winners of the National Jewish Book Award in the Children's Picture Book category in 1984, 1995 and 1996.

Children's Picture Book award winners
Year	Title	Author	Illustrator	Ref.
1983	Yussel's Prayer: A Yom Kippur Story	Barbara Cohen		
1985	Mrs. Moskowitz and the Sabbath Candlesticks	Amy Schwartz		
1986	Brothers: A Hebrew Legend	Florence B. Freedman	Andrew Parker	
1987	Poems for Jewish Holidays	Myra Livingston	Lloyd Bloom	
1988	Exodus	Miriam Chaikin	Charles Mikolaycak	
1989	Just Enough Is Plenty: A Hanukkah Tale	Barbara Diamond Goldin	Seymour Chwast	
1990	Berchick	Esther Silverstein Blanc	Tennessee Dixon	
1991	Hanukkah!	Roni Schotter	Marylin Hafner	
1992	Chicken Man	Michelle Edwards		
1993	Elijah's Angel: A Story for Chanukah and Christmas	Michael J. Rosen	Aminah Brenda Lynn Robinson	
1994	The Always Prayer Shawl	Sheldon Oberman	Ted Lewin	
1997	Marven of the Great North Woods	Kathryn Lasky	Kevin Hawkes	
1998	You Never Know: A Legend of the Lamed-vavniks	Francine Prose	Mark Podwal	
1999	Joseph Had a Little Overcoat	Simms Taback		
2000	Moishe's Miracle: A Hanukkah Story	Laura Krauss Melmed	David Slonim	
2001	The Littlest Pair	Sylvia Rouss	Holly Harmon	
2023	Two New Years	Richard Ho	Lynn Scurfield	
2024	Sharing Shalom	Danielle Sharkan	Selina Alko	

== Contemporary Jewish life and practices ==
The awards in the Contemporary Jewish Life and Practices category are presented to authors of a non-fiction book about current tools and resources for Jewish living. The award was known as the Mimi Frank Award In Memory of Becky Levythe in 2002-2003 and as the Myra H. Kraft Memorial Awards since 2011.

Contemporary Jewish Life and Practices award winners
Year	Title	Author	Ref.
1988	Mixed Blessings: Overcoming the Stumbling Blocks in an Interfaith Marriage	Paul Cowan	
1989	Broken Alliance: The Turbulent Times Between Blacks and Jews in America	Jonathan Kaufman	
1990	Prayer & Community: The Havurah in American Judaism	Riv-Ellen Prell	
1991	Maintaining Consensus: The Canadian Jewish Polity in the Postwar World	Daniel Judah Elazar	
1992	Tradition in a Rootless World: Women Turn to Orthodox Judaism	Lynn Davidman	
1993	Against All Odds: Holocaust Survivors and the Successful Lives They Made in America	William B. Helmreich	
1994	A People Divided: Judaism in Contemporary America	Jack Wertheimer	
2002	To Do the Right and the Good: A Jewish Approach to Modern Social Ethics	Elliot N. Dorff	
2004	The Blessing of a Broken Heart	Sherri Mandell	
2005	The Book of Customs: A Complete Handbook for the Jewish Year	Scott-martin Kosofsky	
2006	FRAGMENTED FAMILIES: Patterns of Estrangement and Reconciliation	Ellen Sucov	
2007	Inventing Jewish Ritual	Vanessa L. Ochs	
2008	Conscience: The Duty to Obey and the Duty to Disobey	Harold M. Schulweis	
2009	Saving Israel: How the Jewish People Can Win a War That May Never End	Daniel Gordis	
2010	Walking Israel: A Personal Search for the Soul of a Nation	Martin Fletcher	
2011	A Guide to Jewish Practice, Vol. 1: Everyday Living	David A. Teutsch	
2012	Davening: A Guide to Meaningful Jewish Prayer	Zalman Schachter-Shalomi	
2013	Kaddish: Women's Voices	Michal Smart	
2015	All Who Go Do Not Return: A Memoir	Shulem Deen	
2016	Changing the World from the Inside Out: A Jewish Approach to Personal and Social Change	David Jaffe	
2017	The Torah of Music	Joey Weisenberg	
2018	The Going: A Meditation on Jewish Law	Leon Wiener Dow	
2019	How to Fight Anti-Semitism	Bari Weiss	
2020	Judaism for the World: Reflections on God, Life, and Love	Arthur Green	
2021	People Love Dead Jews: Reports from a Haunted Present	Dara Horn	
2022	On Repentance And Repair: Making Amends in an Unapologetic World	Danya Ruttenberg	
2023	Loving Our Own Bones: Disability Wisdom and the Spiritual Subversiveness of Knowing Ourselves Whole	Julia Watts Belser	
2024	The Madwoman in the Rabbi’s Attic: Rereading the Women of the Talmud	Gila Fine	

== Contemporary Jewish thought and experience ==
The awards in the Contemporary Jewish thought and experience category, the Maurice Amado Foundation Award, are presented to authors of books about the contemporary Jewish experience.

Contemporary Jewish thought and experience award winner
Year	Title	Author	Ref.
2002-2003	A Jew in America: My Life and A People's Struggle for Identity	Arthur Hertzberg	

== Debut fiction ==
The awards in the Debut Fiction category, the Goldberg Prizes, are presented to authors for their first published novel or short-story collection with Jewish content. The awards were known as the Foundation for Jewish Culture Goldberg Prize from 2011 to 2014. There were no prizes awarded from 2004 to 2009.

Debut Fiction award winners
Year	Title	Author	Ref.
2002-2003	In the Image	Dara Horn	
2010	Rich Boy	Sharon Pomerantz	
2011	Boxer, Beetle	Ned Beauman	
2012	The Sensualist	Daniel Torday	
2013	The Lion Seeker	Kenneth Bonert	
2014	The Mathematician's Shiva	Stuart Rojstaczer	
2015	The Boatmaker	John Benditt	
2016	Anna and the Swallow Man	Gavriel Savit	
2017	Barren Island	Carol Zoref	
2018	The Book of Dirt	Bram Presser	
2019	Naamah	Sarah Blake	
2020	Florence Adler Swims Forever	Rachel Beanland	
2021	A Play for the End of the World	Jai Chakrabarti	
2022	Abomination	Ashley Goldberg	
2023	All-Night Pharmacy	Ruth Madievsky	
2024	The Safekeep	Yael van der Wouden	

== Eastern European studies ==
The awards in the Eastern European Studies category, the Ronald S. Lauder Awards, are presented to authors of books about Eastern Europe. There were no winners in this category in 2001, 2003, and 2004.

Eastern European Studies award winners
Year	Title	Author	Ref.
2000	Polin: A Journal of Polish-Jewish Studies: Special Issue on Ethnic Stereotypes	Antony Polonsky	
2002	Stalin's Secret Pogrom: The Postwar Inquisition of the Jewish Anti-Fascist Committee	Joshua Rubenstein	
2005	The Jewish Century	Yuri Slezkine	
2006	Caviar and Ashes: A Warsaw Generation's Life and Death in Marxism, 1918-1968	Marci Shore	
2007	An Anthology of Jewish-Russian Literature: Two-Centuries of Dual Identity in Prose And Poetry	Maxim Shrayer	

== Education and Jewish identity ==
The awards in the Education and Jewish Identity category are presented to authors of nonfiction works, textbooks excluded, that focuses on the theory, history, or practice of Jewish education and identity. There were no winners in this category in 2007, 2009, and 2011. The award has been presented in memory of Dorothy Kripke since 2008.

Education and Jewish Identity award winners
Year	Title	Author	Ref.
2006	Building Jewish Roots: The Israel Experience	Faydra Shapiro	
2008	What We Now Know About Jewish Education	Roberta Louis Goodman	
2010	Sacred Strategies: Transforming Synagogues from Functional to Visionary	Isa Aron	
2012	Development, Learning, and Community: Educating for Identity in Pluralistic Jewish High Schools	Jeffrey Kress	
2013	Educating in the divine image : gender issues in Orthodox Jewish day schools	Chaya Rosenfeld Gorsetman	
2015	Pastrami on Rye: An Overstuffed History of the Jewish Deli	Ted Merwin	
2016	Next Generation Judaism: How College Students and Hillel Can Help Reinvent Jewish Organizations	Mike Uram	
2017	The Origin of the Jews: The Quest for Roots in a Rootless Age	Steven Weitzman	
2018	The "Talmud": A Biography	Barry Scott Wimpfheimer	
2019	Antisemitism: Here and Now	Deborah Lipstadt	
2020	Hebrew Infusion	Sarah Bunin Benor, Jonathan B. Krasner and Sharon Avni	
2021	Jewish Cultural Studies	Simon J. Bronner	
2022	My Second-Favorite Country	Sivan Zakai	
2023	Israel 201: Your Next-Level Guide to the Magic, Mystery, and Chaos of Life in the Holy Land	Joel Chasnoff and Benji Lovitt	
2024	Uncomfortable Conversations with a Jew	Emmanuel Acho and Noa Tishby	

== English poetry ==
The awards in the English Poetry category are presented to the authors of Jewish poetry in English. There were no winners in this category from 1952 to 1958, in 1961, 1963, 1964, 1965, 1967, 1968, 1970 and from 1972 to 1976. At its inception, in 1951, the award was known as the Florence Dovner Memorial Poetry Award. From 1959 to 1977, it was known as the Harry and Florence Kovner Memorial Poetry Award.

English poetry award winners
Year	Title	Author	Ref.
1951	Jerusalem Has Many Faces	Judah Stampfer	
1959	Come Under the Wings: A Midrash on Ruth	Grace Goldin	
1960	The Spoken Choice	Amy K. Blank	
1962	Works and Days and other Poems.	Irving Feldman	
1966	The Darkening Green	Ruth Finer Mintz	
1969	The Marriage Wig and Other Poems	Ruth Whitman	
1971	Traveler through time	Ruth Finer Mintz	
1977	From the Backyard of the Diaspora.	Myra Sklarew	

== Jewish Book of the Year ==
The award for Jewish Book of the Year, the Everett Family Foundation Award, is presented to authors and editors of Jewish books.

Jewish Book of the Year award winners
Year	Title	Author	Ref.
2002	Six Days of War	Michael B. Oren	
2004	American Judaism: A History	Jonathan D. Sarna	
2005	A Tale of Love and Darkness	Amos Oz	
2006	A Code of Jewish Ethics, Volume 1: You Shall Be Holy	Joseph Telushkin	
2007	How to Read the Bible: A Guide to Scripture, Then and Now	James L. Kugel	
2008	The Torah: A Women's Commentary	Tamara Cohn Eskenazi	
2009	Louis D. Brandeis: A Life	Melvin Urofsky	
2010	When They Come for Us, We'll Be Gone: The Epic Struggle to Save Soviet Jewry	Gal Beckerman	
2011	Jerusalem: The Biography	Simon Sebag Montefiore	
2012	City of Promises: A History of the Jews of New York	Deborah Dash Moore	
2013	Like Dreamers: The Story of the Israeli Paratroopers Who Reunited Jerusalem and Divided a Nation	Yossi Klein Halevi	
2014	Jewish Lives Series	Ileene Smith (editorial director)	
2015	Anonymous Soldiers: The Struggle for Israel, 1917-1947	Bruce Hoffman	
2016	Israel: A Concise History of a Nation Reborn	Daniel Gordis	
2017	Lioness: Golda Meir and the Nation of Israel	Francine Klagsbrun	
2018	Hunting the Truth: Memoirs of Beate and Serge Klarsfeld	Beate Klarsfeld	
2019	America's Jewish Women: A History from Colonial Times to Today	Pamela Nadell	
2020	Morality: Restoring the Common Good in Divided Times	Joseph Telushkin	
2021	To Repair a Broken World: The Life of Henrietta Szold, Founder of Hadassah	Dvora Hacohen	
2022	Koshersoul: The Faith and Food Journey of an African American Jew	Michael W. Twitty	
2023	Time’s Echo: The Second World War, the Holocaust, and the Music of Remembrance	Jeremy Eichler	
2024	10/7: 100 Human Stories	Lee Yaron	

== Fiction ==
The JJ Greenberg Memorial Award, named after a former President of the Jewish Book Council, is awarded to authors of a novel or short-story collection of exemplary literary merit, with Jewish content.

Fiction award winners
Year	Title	Author	Ref.
1950	The Wall	John Hersey	
1951	The Son of the Lost Son	Soma Morgenstern	
1952	Quiet Street	Zelda Popkin	
1953	The Juggler	Michael Blankfort	
1954	In the Morning Light	Charles Angoff	
1955	Blessed Is The Land	Louis Zara	
1957	Raquel: The Jewess of Toledo	Lion Feuchtwanger	
1958	The Assistant	Bernard Malamud	
1960	Goodbye, Columbus and Five Short Stories	Philip Roth	
1961	The Human Season	Edward Lewis Wallant	
1962	Wedding Band	Samuel Yellen	
1963	The Slave	Isaac Bashevis Singer	
1964	The King's Persons	Joanne Greenberg	
1965	The Town Beyond the Wall	Elie Wiesel	
1966	The Stronghold	Meyer Levin	
1967	The Well	Chaim Grade	
1969	Memory of Autumn	Charles Angoff	
1970	Waiting for the News	Leo Litwak	
1972	The Pagan Rabbi and Other Stories	Cynthia Ozick	
1973	Somewhere Else	Robert Kotlowitz	
1974	Judah the Pious	Francine Prose	
1975	White Eagle, Dark Skies	Jean Karsavina	
1976	Other People's Lives	Johanna Kaplan	
1977	Bloodshed and Three Novellas	Cynthia Ozick	
1978	The Yeshiva	Chaim Grade	
1979	Leah's Journey	Gloria Goldreich	
1980	The Apathetic Bookie Joint	Daniel Fuchs	
1981	O My America!	Johanna Kaplan	
1982	Ellis Island and Other Stories	Mark Helprin	
1983	Temple	Robert Greenfield	
1984	An Admirable Woman	Arthur A. Cohen	
1985	Invisible Mending	Frederick Busch	
1986	The Unloved: From the Diary of Perla S. (Jewish Lives)	Arnošt Lustig	
1988	The Counterlife	Philip Roth	
1989	The Immortal Bartfuss	Aharon Appelfeld	
1990	Five Seasons	A. B. Yehoshua	
1991	The Gift of Asher Lev	Chaim Potok	
1992	Rosendorf Quartet	Nathan Shaham	
1993	Mr. Mani	A. B. Yehoshua	
1994	The Prince of West End Avenue	Alan Isler	
1995	Mazel	Rebecca Goldstein	
1996	Gangsters	Evan Zimroth	
1997	The Actual	Saul Bellow	
1998	The Iron Tracks	Aharon Appelfeld	
1999	The Wedding Jester	Steve Stern	
2000	The Human Stain	Philip Roth	
2001	Everything Is Illuminated	Jonathan Safran Foer	
2002-2003	The Russian Debutante's Handbook	Gary Shteyngart	
2004	Portrait of My Mother, Who Posed Nude in Wartime: Stories	Marjorie Sandor	
2005	The Final Solution. A Story of Detection	Michael Chabon	
2006	The World to Come	Dara Horn	
2007	A Pigeon and a Boy	Meir Shalev	
2008	Songs for the Butcher's Daughter	Peter Manseau	
2009	Gratitude	Joseph Kertes	
2010	To the End of the Land	David Grossman	
2011	Until the Dawn's Light	Aharon Appelfeld	
2012	The Innocents	Francesca Segal	
2013	Between Friends	Amos Oz	
2014	The Betrayers	David Bezmozgis	
2014	To Rise Again at a Decent Hour	Joshua Ferris	
2015	The Last Flight of Poxl West	Daniel Torday	
2016	The Gustav Sonata	Rose Tremain	
2017	A Horse Walks Into a Bar	David Grossman	
2018	The Last Watchman of Old Cairo	Michael David Lukas	
2019	Fly Already: Stories	Etgar Keret	
2020	Apeirogon	Colum McCann	
2021	The Netanyahus: An Account of a Minor and Ultimately Even Negligible Episode in the History of a Very Famous Family	Joshua Cohen	
2022	Signal Fires	Dani Shapiro	
2023	The Heaven and Earth Grocery Store	James McBride	
2024	Songs for the Brokenhearted	Ayelet Tsabari	

== Food Writing and Cookbook ==
The awards in the Food Writing and Cookbook category, the Jane and Stuart Weitzman Family Award, are presented to authors of cookbooks or works of food writing that explores Jewish identity, history, and culture.

Food Writing and Cookbook award winners
Year	Title	Author	Ref.
2019	Jewish Cuisine in Hungary. A Cultural History with 83 Authentic Recipes	Andras Koerner	
2020	Now for Something Sweet	Monday Morning Cooking Club	
2021	Bene Appétit: The Cuisine of Indian Jews	Esther David	
2022	Cooking alla Giudia: A Celebration of the Jewish Food of Italy	Benedetta Jasmine Guetta	
2023	Kibbitz and Nosh: When We All Met At Dubrow's Cafeteria	Marcia Bricker Halperin	
2024	Forbidden: A 3,000-Year History of Jews and the Pig	Jordan D. Rosenblum	

== Hebrew Fiction in Translation ==
Hebrew Fiction in Translation award winners
Year	Title	Author	Translator	Ref.
2022	Love	Maayan Eitan	Maayan Eitan	
2023	Operation Bethlehem	Yariv Inbar	Dalit Shmueli	
2024	The Hebrew Teacher	Maya Arad	Jessica Cohen	

== History ==
The awards in the History category, the Gerrard and Ella Berman Memorial Award, are presented to authors of non-fiction books concerning Jewish history.

History award winners
Year	Title	Author	Ref.
2006	Becoming Eichmann: Rethinking the Life, Crimes, and Trial of a "Desk Murderer"	David Cesarani	
2007	Churchill's Promised Land: Zionism and Statecraft	Michael Makovsky	
2008	1948: A History of the First Arab-Israeli War	Benny Morris	
2009	Family Properties: Race, Real Estate, and the Exploitation of Black Urban America	Beryl Satter	
2010	Early Modern Jewry: A New Cultural History	David B. Ruderman	
2011	The Anatomy of Israel's Survival	Hirsh Goodman	
2012	Israel: A History (The Schusterman Series in Israel Studies)	Anita Shapira	
2013	My Promised Land: The Triumph and Tragedy of Israel	Ari Shavit	
2014	The Golden Age Shtetl: A New History of Jewish Life in East Europe	Yohanan Petrovsky-Shtern	
2015	Doomed to Succeed: The U.S.-Israel Relationship from Truman to Obama	Dennis Ross	
2016	The Angel: The Egyptian Spy Who Saved Israel	Uri Bar-Joseph	
2017	The Many Deaths of Jew Süss: The Notorious Trial and Execution of an Eighteenth-Century Court Jew	Yair Mintzker	
2018	Rise and Kill First: The Secret History of Israel's Targeted Assassinations	Ronen Bergman	
2019	The Guarded Gate: Bigotry, Eugenics, and the Law That Kept Two Generations of Jews, Italians, and Other European Immigrants Out of America	Daniel Okrent	
2020	The Art of the Jewish Family: A History of Women in Early New York in Five Objects	Laura Arnold Leibman	
2021	The House of Fragile Things: Jewish Art Collectors and the Fall of France	James McAuley	
2022	An Unchosen People: Jewish Political Reckoning in Interwar Poland	Kenneth B. Moss	
2023	Time’s Echo: The Second World War, the Holocaust, and the Music of Remembrance	Jeremy Eichler	
2024	Reading Herzl in Beirut: The PLO Effort to Know the Enemy	Jonathan Marc Gribetz	

== Holocaust ==
Holocaust award winners
Year	Title	Author	Ref.
1966	Analytical Franco-Jewish Gazetteer, 1939-1945	Zosa Szajkowski	
1968	And the Crooked Shall Be Made Straight: The Eichmann Trial, Jewish Catastrophe, and Hannah Ahrendt's Narrorative	Jacob Robinson	
1969	The Holocaust: the Destruction of European Jewry, 1933-1945	Nora Levin	
1969	The Story of the Jewish Catastrophe in Europe. Experimental Edition 1967	Judah Pilch	
1970	Lexicon of the Yiddish Theatre, (Fun Yiddishin Theater) YIDDISH ONLY Volume V Only	Zalme Zylberzweig	
1972	The Politics of Rescue: The Roosevelt Administration & the Holocaust 1938-1945	Henry L. Feingold	
1975	Judenrat : the Jewish Councils in Eastern Europe Under Nazi Occupation	Isaiah Trunk	
1976	Jerusalem of Lithuania: illustrated and documeted	Leyzer Ran	
1978	The Survivor: An Anatomy of Life in the Death Camps	Terrence Des Pres	
1979	Deliverance Day: The Last Hours at Dachau	Michael Selzer	
1980	Less Than Slaves: Jewish Forced Labor and the Quest for Compensation	Benjamin B. Ferencz	
1981	The Politics of Genocide: The Holocaust in Hungary	Randolph L. Braham	
1982	Vichy France and the Jews	Michael R. Marrus	
1983	None Is Too Many: Canada and the Jews of Europe, 1933-1948	Irving M. Abella	
1984	Quality of Witness: A Romanian Diary, 1937-1944	Emil Dorian	
1985	The Abandonment of the Jews: America and the Holocaust 1941-1945	David S. Wyman	
1987	The Nazi Doctors: Medical Killing and the Psychology of Genocide	Robert Jay Lifton	
1988	The Italians and the Holocaust: Persecution, Rescue, and Survival	Susan Zuccotti	
1989	Blowback: America's Recruitment of Nazis and Its Effects on the Cold War	Christopher Simpson	
1990	A Cup of Tears: A Diary of the Warsaw Ghetto	Abraham Lewin	
1991	The Holocaust: The Fate of European Jewry, 1932-1945	Leni Yahil	
1992	Women in the Holocaust	Dalia Ofer	
1993	The Texture of Memory: Holocaust Memorials and Meaning	James E. Young	
1994	Ordinary Men: Reserve Police Battalion 101 and the Final Solution in Poland	Christopher R. Browning	
1995	We Are Children Just the Same: Vedem, the Secret Magazine by the Boys of Terezin	Paul R. Wilson (trans.)	
1996	Auschwitz	Debórah Dwork	
1997	The Years of Persecution: Nazi Germany and the Jews, 1933-1939	Saul Friedländer	
1998	Between Dignity and Despair: Jewish Life in Nazi Germany	Marion A. Kaplan	
1999	Reading the Holocaust	Inga Clendinnen	
2000	Hitler's Austria: Popular Sentiment in the Nazi Era, 1938-1945	Evan Burr Bukey	
2002-2003	Resilience and Courage: Women, Men and the Holocaust	Nechama Tec	
2004	The Origins of the Final Solution: The Evolution of Nazi Jewish Policy, September 1939-March 1942	Christopher R. Browning	
2005	History on Trial: My Day in Court with a Holocaust Denier	Deborah E. Lipstadt	
2006	The Jewish Enemy: Nazi Propaganda during World War II and the Holocaust	Jeffrey Herf	
2007	Hitler's Beneficiaries: Plunder, Racial War, and the Nazi Welfare State	Götz Aly	
2008	The Holocaust by Bullets: A Priest's Journey to Uncover the Truth Behind the Murder of 1.5 Million Jews	Patrick Desbois	
2009	The United States Holocaust Memorial Museum Encyclopedia of Camps and Ghettos, 1933-1945, Volume 1, Early Camps, Youth Camps, and Concentration Camps and Subcamps under the SS-Business Administration Main Office (WVHA) (A & B)	Geoffrey P. Megargee	
2010	Remembering Survival. Inside a Nazi Slave-labor Camp	Christopher R. Browning	
2011	Nazis on the Run: How Hitler's Henchmen Fled Justice	Gerald Steinacher	
2012	Collect and Record!: Jewish Holocaust Documentation in Early Postwar Europe (Oxford Series on History and Archives)	Laura Jockusch	
2013	The Geographical Encyclopedia of the Holocaust in Hungary	Randolph L. Braham	
2014	Violins of Hope: Violins of the Holocaust--Instruments of Hope and Liberation in Mankind's Darkest Hour	James A. Grymes	
2015	The Crime and the Silence: Confronting the Massacre of Jews in Wartime Jedwabne	Anna Bikont	
2016	Holocaust, Genocide, and the Law: A Quest for Justice in a Post-Holocaust World	Michael Bazyler	
2017	The Book Smugglers: Partisans, Poets, and the Race to Save Jewish Treasures from the Nazis	David E. Fishman	
2018	Anatomy of a Genocide: The Life and Death of a Town Called Buczacz	Omer Bartov	
2019	The Unwanted: America, Auschwitz, and a Village Caught In Between	Michael Dobbs	
2020	The Unanswered Letter: One Holocaust Family’s Desperate Plea for Help	Faris Cassell	
2021	The Ravine: A Family, a Photograph, a Holocaust Massacre Revealed	Wendy Lower	
2022	The Escape Artist: The Man Who Broke Out of Auschwitz to Warn the World	Jonathan Freedland	
2023	Time’s Echo: The Second World War, the Holocaust, and the Music of Remembrance	Jeremy Eichler	
2024	Occupied Words: What the Holocaust Did to Yiddish	Hannah Pollin-Galay	

== Holocaust Memoir Award ==
Holocaust Memoir award winners
Year	Title	Author	Ref.
2022	One Hundred Saturdays: Stella Levi and the Search for a Lost World	Michael Frank	
2023	The Ghost Tattoo	Tony Bernard	
2024	Warsaw Testament	Samuel Kassow	

== Illustrated children's book ==
The awards in the Illustrated Children's Book category, the Louis Posner Memorial Awards, are presented jointly to authors and illustrators of Jewish illustrated children's book.

Illustrated Children's Book award winners
Year	Title	Author	Illustrator	Ref.
2004	Luba: The Angel of Bergen-Belsen	Michelle R. McCann and Luba Tryszynska-Frederick		
2005	The Travels of Benjamin of Tudela: Through Three Continents in the Twelfth Century	Uri Shulevitz		
2006	The White Ram: A Story of Abraham and Isaac	Mordicai Gerstein		
2007	Even Higher	Richard Ungar		
2008	The Mysterious Guests: A Sukkot Story	Eric A. Kimmel	Katya Krenina	
2009	JPS illustrated children's Bible	Ellen Frankel	Avi Katz	
2010	The Rooster Prince of Beslov	Ann Redisch Stampler	Eugene Yelchin	
2011	The Golem's Latkes	Eric A. Kimmel	Aaron Jasinski	
2012	The Shema in the Mezuzah: Listening to Each Other	Sandy Eisenberg Sasso	Joani Keller Rothenberg	
2013	Hanukkah Bear	Eric A. Kimmel	Mike Wohnoutka	
2014	The Patchwork Torah (Sukkot & Simchat Torah)	Allison Ofanansky	Elsa Oriol	

== Israel ==
Israel award winners
Year	Title	Author	Ref.
1974	The Question of Palestine: British-Jewish-Arab Relations 1914-1918	Isaiah Friedman	
1975	The Forgotten Friendship: Israel and the Soviet Bloc, 1947-53	Arnold Krammer	
1976	American Zionism from Herzl to the Holocaust	Melvin I. Urofsky	
1977	A History of Israel: From the Rise of Zionism to Our Time	Howard Sachar	
1978	Letters to an American Jewish friend: A Zionist's polemic	Hillel Halkin	
1979	Raquela: A Woman of Israel	Ruth Gruber	
1980	The Habima, Israel's National Theater, 1917-1977: A Study of Cultural Nationalism	Emanuel Levy	
1982	Egypt and Israel	Howard Sachar	
1983	Among Lions: The Definitive Account of the 1967 Battle for Jerusalem	J. Robert Moskin	
1984	Israel in the Mind of America	Peter Grose	
1985	From Time Immemorial: The Origins of the Arab-Jewish Conflict over Palestine	Joan Peters	
1986	The Other Arab-Israeli Conflict: Making America's Middle East Policy, from Truman to Reagan	Steven L. Spiegel	
1987	A Walker in Jerusalem	Samuel C. Heilman	
1988	Ben-Gurion: The Burning Ground, 1886-1948	Shabtai Teveth	
1989	Stealing Home: Israel Bound and Rebound	Haim Chertok	
1990	A Mandate for Terror: The United Nations and the Plo	Harris Okun Schoenberg	
1991	The Vatican and Zionism: Conflict in the Holy Land, 1895-1925	Sergio I. Minerbi	
1992	The Road Not Taken: Early Arab-Israeli Negotiations	Itamar Rabinovich	
1993	Land and Power: The Zionist Resort to Force, 1881-1948	Anita Shapira	
1994	Elusive Prophet: Ahad Ha'am and the Origins of Zionism	Steven J. Zipperstein	
1995	Beyond The Promised Land: Jews And Arabs On The Hard Road To A New Israel	Glenn Frankel	
1996	The Controversy of Zion: Jewish Nationalism, the Jewish State, and the Unresolved Jewish Dilemma	Geoffrey Wheatcroft	
1997	Rubber Bullets: Power and Conscience in Modern Israel	Yaron Ezrahi	
1998	Israel's Place in the Middle East: A Pluralist Perspective	Nissim Rejwan	
1999	The Multiple Identities of the Middle East	Bernard Lewis	
2000	One Palestine, Complete: Jews and Arabs Under the British Mandate	Tom Segev	

== Jewish education ==
The awards in the Jewish Education category, the Leon Jolson Awards, are presented to authors of books on the subject.

Jewish Education award winners
Year	Title	Author	Ref.
1994	Studies in Jewish Education, volume 5 Educational Issues and Classical Jewish Texts	Howard Deitcher and Abraham J. Tannenbaum	
1997	Succeeding at Jewish Education: How One Synagogue Made It Work	Joseph B. Reimer	
1998	First Fruit: A Whizin Anthology of Jewish Family Education	Ronald Wolfson	
1999	Transmission and Transformation: A Jewish Perspective on Moral Education	Carol K. Ingall	
2001	Reclaiming Goodness	Hanan Alexander	
2004	Textual Knowledge: Teaching the Bible in Theory and in Practice	Barry W. Holtz	

== Jewish family literature ==
The awards in the Jewish Family Literature category, in memory of Dorothy Kripke, are presented to authors of books on the subject.

Jewish Family Literature award winners
Year	Title	Author	Ref.
2005	A Box of Candles	Laurie A. Jacobs	
2006	Lilith's Ark: Teenage Tales of Biblical Women	Deborah Bodin Cohen	
2007	Power of Song: And Other Sephardic Tales	Rita Roth	
2008	Genesis-The Book With Seventy Faces: A Guide for the Family	Esther Takac	
2009	Celebrating the Jewish Year: The Spring and Summer Holidays: Passover, Shavuot, The Omer, Tisha B'Av	Paul Steinberg	

== Jewish folklore and anthropology ==
The awards in the Jewish folklore and anthropology category, the Raphael Patai Award, are presented to authors and editors of books on the subject.

Jewish Folklore and Anthropology award winners
Year	Title	Author	Ref.
1993	Hasidic People: A Place in the New World	Jerome Mintz	
1994	Folklore of the Sephardic Jews, volume III	Samuel G. Armistead and Joseph H. Silverman	
1995	Chosen Tales: Stories Told by Jewish Storytellers	Peninnah Schram	

== Jewish history ==
Jewish History award winners
Year	Title	Author	Ref.
1963	The Promised City: New York's Jews, 1870-1914, Revised edition	Moses Rischin	
1973	A Jewish Princedom in Feudal France, 768-900	Arthur J. Zuckerman	
1974	The Jews of Poland: A Social and Economic History of the Jewish Community in Poland from 1100 to 1800	Bernard D. Weinryb	
1976	The Myth of the Jewish Race	Raphael Patai	
1977	World of Our Fathers	Irving Howe	
1978	On the Edge of Destruction : Jews of Poland between the Two World Wars	Celia Stopnicka Heller	
1980	The Jews of Georgian England, 1714-1830: Tradition and Change in a Liberal Society	Todd M. Endelman	
1981	Jewish Self-Government in Medieval Egypt: The Origins of the Office of Head of the Jews, Ca. 1065–1126	Mark R. Cohen	
1982	The World of a Renaissance Jew: The Life and Thought of Abraham Ben Mordecai Farissol	David B. Ruderman	
1983	Zakhor: Jewish History and Jewish Memory	Yosef Hayim Yerushalmi	
1984	Tsar Nicholas I and the Jews: The Transformation of Jewish society in Russia, 1825-1855	Michael Stanislawski	
1985	Encounter with Emancipation: The German Jews in the United States, 1830-1914	Naomi Wiener Cohen	
1986	Religious Conflict in Social Context: The Resurgence of Orthodox Judaism in Frankfurt am Main, 1838-1877	Robert Liberles	
1987	Power & Powerlessness in Jewish History	David Biale	
1988	European Jewry and the First Crusade	Robert Chazan	
1989	Response to Modernity: A History of the Reform Movement in Judaism	Michael A. Meyer	
1990	The Road to Modern Jewish Politics: Political Tradition and Political Reconstruction in the Jewish Community of Tsarist Russia	Eli Lederhendler	
1991	The Pursuit of Heresy: Rabbi Moses Hagiz and the Sabbatian Controversies	Elisheva Carlebach Jofen	
1992	The Making of the Jewish Middle Class: Women, Family, and Identity in Imperial Germany	Marion A. Kaplan	
1993	Jews in Christian America: The Pursuit of Religious Equality	Naomi W. Cohen	
1994	Antisemitism in America	Leonard Dinnerstein	
1995	The Wonders of America: Reinventing Jewish Culture 1880-1950	Jenna Weissman Joselit	
1996	Founder of Hasidism: A Quest for the Historical Ba'al Shem Tov	Moshe Rosman	
1997	German-Jewish History in Modern Times, volume 4: Renewal and Destruction, 1918–1945	Michael A. Meyer	
1998	Hebrews of the Portuguese Nation: Conversos and Community in Early Modern Amsterdam (The Modern Jewish Experience)	Miriam Bodian	
1999	Berlin Metropolis: Jews and the New Culture, 1890-1918 [exhibition]	Emily D. Bilski	
2002	Constantine's Sword: The Church and the Jews: A History	James Carroll	
2002-2003	Irving Howe: A Life of Passionate Dissent	Gerald Sorin	
2004	And the Dead Shall Rise	Steve Oney	
2005	Salonica, City of Ghosts: Christians, Muslims and Jews, 1430-1950	Mark Mazower	

== Jewish Thought ==
Jewish Thought award winners
Year	Title	Author	Ref.
1949	Philo: Foundations of Religious Philosophy in Judaism, Christianity, and Islam	Harry Austryn Wolfson	
1950	The Jews in Medieval Germany: A Study of Their Legal and Social Status	Guido Kisch	
1964	Judaism: Profile of a Faith	Ben-Zion Bokser	
1965	Ancient Jewish Philosophy	Israel Efros	
1966	The Higher Freedom: A New Turning Point in Jewish History	David Polish	
1967	Understanding Genesis	Nahum M. Sarna	
1968	The Origins of the Modern Jew: Jewish Identity and European Culture in Germany, 1749-1824	Michael A. Meyer	
1969	Quest for Past and Future: Essays in Jewish Theology	Emil L. Fackenheim	
1970	Israel: An Echo of Eternity	Abraham Joshua Heschel	
1971	The Religion of Ethical Nationhood: Judaism's Contribution to World Peace	Mordecai Menahem Kaplan	
1972	Jewish Worship	Abraham E. Millgram	
1973	Souls on Fire: Portraits and Legends of Hasidic Masters	Elie Wiesel	
1973	Two Living Traditions: Essays on Religion and the Bible	Samuel Sandmel	
1974	The Mask Jews Wear: The Self-Deceptions of American Jewry	Eugene B. Borowitz	
1975	Major Themes in Modern Philosophies of Judaism	Eliezer Berkovits	
1976	Contemporary Reform Responsa	Solomon Bennett Freehof	
1977	Maimonides: Torah and Philosophic Quest	David Hartman	
1978	The Jewish Mind	Raphael Patai	
1979	Love and Sex: A Modern Jewish Perspective	Robert Gordis	
1980	Gershom Scholem: Kabbalah and Counter-History	David Biale	
1981	Introduction to the Code of Maimonides	Isadore Twersky	
1982	The Art of Biblical Narrative	Robert Alter	
1983	Hispano-Jewish Culture in Transition: The Career and Controversies of Ramah	Bernard Septimus	
1984	Post-Holocaust Dialogues: Critical Studies in Modern Jewish Thought	Steven T. Katz	
1985	Halakhic Man	Joseph B. Soloveitchik	
1986	A Living Covenant: The Innovative Spirit in Traditional Judaism	David Hartman	
1987	Galut: Modern Jewish Reflection on Homelessness and Homecoming	Arnold M. Eisen	
1988	The Orphaned Adult: Confronting the Death of a Parent	Marc D. Angel	
1989	Commandments and Concerns	Michael Rosenak	
1990	Jewish Preaching, 1200-1800: An Anthology	Marc Saperstein	
1991	Sacred Fragments: Recovering Theology for the Modern Jew	Neil Gillman	
1992	Freud's Moses: Judaism Terminable and Interminable	Yosef Hayim Yerushalmi	
1993	Women as Ritual Experts	Susan Starr Sered	
1994	The Kiss of God: Spiritual and Mystical Death in Judaism	Michael Fishbane	
1996	Moses and Civilization: The Meaning Behind Freud`s Myth	Robert A. Paul	
1997	Stalking Elijah: Adventures with Today's Jewish Mystical Masters	Rodger Kamenetz	
1998	Engendering Judaism: An Inclusive Theology and Ethics	Rachel Adler	
1999	Religious Thought of Hasidism: Text and Commentary	Norman Lamm	
2000	A Letter in the Scroll: Understanding Our Jewish Identity and Exploring the Legacy of the World's Oldest Religion	Jonathan Sacks	
2001	When a Jew Dies: The Ethnography of a Bereaved Son	Samuel C. Heilman	

== Jewish-Christian relations ==
The awards in the Jewish-Christian Relations category, the Charles H. Revson Foundation Awards, are presented to authors of books on the subject.

Jewish-Christian Relations award winners
Year	Title	Author	Ref.
1995	Spiritual Pilgrimage: Texts on Jews and Judaism, 1979-1995	Pope John Paul II	
1996	The Mystery of Romans: The Jewish Context of Paul's Letter	Mark D. Nanos	
1997	The Kidnapping of Edgardo Mortara	David I. Kertzer	
1998	Abraham Geiger and the Jewish Jesus	Susannah Heschel	
1999	Jesus of Nazareth, King of the Jews: A Jewish Life and the Emergence of Christianity	Paula Fredriksen	
2000	Under His Very Windows: The Vatican and the Holocaust in Italy	Susan Zuccotti	
2002	Jazz Age Jews	Michael Alexander	

== Mentorship Award ==
This award seeks to recognize individuals employed in traditional publishing or working independently as editors, agents, publicists, publishers, literary critics and have exhibited substantial engagement with Jewish authors.

Mentorship award winners
Year	Winner
2017	Gary Rosenblatt
2018	Susan Shapiro
2019	Dena W. Neusner
2020	Deborah Harris
2021	Bonny V. Fetterman
2022	Ellen Frankel
2023	Altie Karper
2024	Aaron Lansky

== Middle Grade Literature ==
Middle Grade Literature award winners
Year	Title	Author	Ref.
2020	The Blackbird Girls	Anne Blankman	
2021	Linked	Gordon Korman	
2022	The Prince of Steel Pier	Stacy Nockowitz	
2023	The Dubious Pranks of Shaindy Goodman	Mari Lowe	
2024	Finn and Ezra’s Bar Mitzvah Time Loop	Joshua S. Levy	

== Modern Jewish thought and experience ==
Modern Jewish Thought and Experience award winners
Year	Title	Author	Ref.
2004	The Zohar: Pritzker Edition volume 1	Daniel C. Matt	
2006	The Rabbi's Wife: The Rebbetzin in American Jewish Life	Shuly Rubin Schwartz	
2007	My People's Prayer Book Series	Lawrence A. Hoffman	
2008	Emil L. Fackenheim: A Jewish Philosopher's Response to the Holocaust (Philosophy)	David Patterson	
2009	Genesis: The Book of Beginnings	Jonathan Sacks	
2010	The Koren Mesorat Harav Kinot	Joseph B. Soloveitchik	
2011	The Choice To Be: A Jewish Path to Self and Spirituality	Jeremy Kagan	
2012	Koren Talmud Bavli, Vol. 1:Tractate Berakhot, Hebrew/English, Standard (Color) (English and Hebrew Edition)	Adin Even-Israel Steinsaltz	
2013	The Koren Pesah Mahzor = [Mahzor Koren le-Fesah]	Jonathan Sacks	
2005	After Emancipation: Jewish Religious Responses To Modernity	David Harry Ellenson	
2014	Ani Tefilla Weekday Siddur: Ashkenaz (Hebrew/English Edition)	Jay Goldmintz	
2015	Not in God's Name: Confronting Religious Violence	Jonathan Sacks	
2018	Does Judaism Condone Violence?: Holiness and Ethics in the Jewish Tradition	Alan L. Mittleman	
2019	Legacy of Blood: Jews, Pogroms, and Ritual Murder in the Lands of the Soviets	Elissa Bemporad	
2020	Morality: Restoring the Common Good in Divided Times	Jonathan Sacks	
2021	Torah in a Time of Plague: Historical and Contemporary Jewish Responses	Erin Leib Smokler (ed.)	
2022	Figuring Jerusalem: Politics and Poetics in the Sacred Center	Sidra DeKoven Ezrahi	
2023	The Eleventh Plague: Jews and Pandemics from the Bible to COVID-19	Jeremy Brown	
2024	Tablets Shattered: The End of an American Jewish Century and the Future of Jewish Life	Joshua Leifer	

== Non-fiction ==
Nonfiction award winners
Year	Title	Author	Ref.
1995	The Beginning of Desire	Avivah Gottlieb Zornberg	
1996	Shalom, Friend: The Life and Legacy of Yitzhak Rabin	David Horovitz	
1997	Unfinished People: Eastern European Jews Encounter America	Ruth Gay	
1998	Kaddish	Leon Wieseltier	
1999	Yosl Rakover Talks to God	Zvi Kolitz	
2000	Jew vs. Jew: The Struggle for the Soul of American Jewry	Samuel G. Freedman	
2001	Etz Hayim: Torah and Commentary	David L. Lieber	

== Poetry ==
The awards in the Poetry category, the Berru Award in Memory of Ruth and Bernie Weinflash, are presented to authors of books of verse consisting primarily of poems of Jewish concern.

Poetry award winners
Year	Title	Author	Ref.
2005	Everything is Burning: Poems	Gerald Stern	
2007	The Dream of the Poem: Hebrew Poetry from Muslim and Christian Spain, 950-1492	Peter Cole	
2009	The Book of Seventy (Pitt Poetry Series)	Alicia Ostriker	
2011	Wait: Poems	C. K. Williams	
2013	Who Touches Everything	Peter Waldor	
2015	Gabriel: A Poem	Edward Hirsch	
2016	"Almost Complete Poems"	Stanley Moss	
2017	Waiting for the Light (Pitt Poetry Series)	Alicia Ostriker	
2018	Holy Moly Carry Me (American Poets Continuum)	Erika Meitner	
2019	Deaf Republic	Ilya Kaminsky	
2020	Nautilus and Bone	Lisa Richter	
2021	The Book of Anna	Joy Ladin	
2022	Today in the Taxi	Sean Singer	
2023	When There Was Light	Carlie Hoffman	
2024	The Story of Your Obstinate Survival	Daniel Khalastchi	

References award winners
Year	Title	Author	Ref.
1999	The Hebrew Folktale: History, Genre, Meaning	Eli Yassif	
2000	Reader's Guide to Judaism	Michael Terry (ed.)	
2002	The Encyclopedia of Jewish Life Before and During the Holocaust	Shmuel Spector (ed.-in-chief) and Geoffrey Wigoder (consulting ed.)	
2005	Tree of Souls: The Mythology of Judaism	Howard Schwartz	
2007	The Cambridge History of Judaism, Vol. 4: The Late Roman-Rabbinic Period	Steven T. Katz	

== Scholarship ==
Scholarship award winners
Year	Title	Author	Ref.
1983	The Friars and the Jews: Evolution of Medieval Anti-Judaism	Jeremy Cohen	
1984	A Mediterranean Society: The Jewish Communities of the Arab World as Portrayed in the Documents of the Cairo Geniza, Vol. IV: Daily Life	Shelomo Dov Goitein	
1985	The Wars of the Lord (Vol. 1)	Levi ben Gershom	
1986	Biblical Interpretation in Ancient Israel	Michael Fishbane	
1987	Sifre: A Tannaitic Commentary on the Book of Deuteronomy	Reuven Hammer	
1988	Medieval Jewish Seals from Europe	Daniel M. Friedenberg	
1989	Kabbalah: New Perspectives	Moshe Idel	
1990	"Be Fertile and Increase, Fill the Earth and Master It": The Ancient and Medieval Career of a Biblical Text	Jeremy Cohen	
1991	History, Religion, and Antisemitism (Centennial Book)	Gavin I. Langmuir	
1992	From Tradition to Commentary: Torah and Its Interpretation in the Midrash Sifre to Deuteronomy	Steven D. Fraade	
1993	Jewish Education and Society in the High Middle Ages	Ephraim Kanarfogel	
1994	Jewish Law: History, Sources, Principles	Menachem Elon	
1995	Through a Speculum That Shines	Elliot R. Wolfson	
1996	Your Voice Like a Ram's Horn: Themes and Texts in Traditional Jewish Preaching	Marc Saperstein	
1997	Revelation Restored: Divine Writ and Critical Responses	David Weiss Halivni	
1998	Entering the High Holy Days: A Guide to Origins, Themes, and Prayers	Reuven Hammer	
1999	Living Letters of the Law: Ideas of the Jew in Medieval Christianity	Jeremy Cohen	
2000	The Modern Jewish Canon: A Journey through Language and Culture	Ruth R. Wisse	
2001	Imperialism and Jewish Society: 200 B.C.E. to 640 C.E.	Seth Schwartz	
2002-2003	The Oxford Handbook of Jewish Studies	Martin Goodman	
2004	The Jewish Study Bible: Featuring the Jewish Publication Society Tanakh Translation	Adele Berlin	
2005	Language, Eros, Being: Kabbalistic Hermeneutics and Poetic Imagination	Elliot R. Wolfson	
2006	Resurrection and the Restoration of Israel: The Ultimate Victory of the God of Life	Jon D. Levenson	
2007	Ben: Sonship and Jewish Mysticism	Moshe Idel	
2008	The Kuzari and the Shaping of Jewish Identity, 1167-1900	Adam Shear	
2009	Subversive Sequels in the Bible	Judy Klitsner	
2010	From Continuity to Contiguity: Toward a New Jewish Literary Thinking (Stanford Studies in Jewish History and C)	Dan Miron	
2011	Becoming the People of the Talmud: Oral Torah as Written Tradition in Medieval Jewish Cultures	Talya Fishman	
2012	The Chosen Few: How Education Shaped Jewish History, 70-1492	Maristella Botticini, Zvi Eckstein	
2013	Maimonides: Life and Thought	Moshe Halbertal	
2014	Outside the Bible, 3-Volume Set: Ancient Jewish Writings Related to Scripture	Louis H. Feldman, James L. Kugel and Lawrence H. Schiffman	
2015	What's Divine about Divine Law?: Early Perspectives	Christine Hayes	
2016	Anti-Jewish Riots in the Crown of Aragon and the Royal Response 1391 – 1392	Benjamin R. Gampel	
2017	Pious Irreverence: Confronting God in Rabbinic Judaism (Divinations: Rereading Late Ancient Religion)	Dov Weiss	
2018	Historical Atlas of Hasidism	Marcin Wodziński	
2019	Rashi’s Commentary on the Torah: Canonization and Resistance in the Reception of a Jewish Classic	Eric Lawee	
2020	Time and Difference in Rabbinic Judaism	Sarit Kattan Gribetz	
2021	Jews and Their Roman Rivals: Pagan Rome’s Challenge to Israel	Katell Berthelot	
2022	The Heresy of Jacob Frank: From Jewish Messianism to Esoteric Myth	Jay Michaelson	
2023	Fractured Tablets: Forgetfulness and Fallibility in Late Ancient Rabbinic Culture	Mira Balberg	
2024	Babylonian Jews and Sasanian Imperialism in Late Antiquity	Simcha Gross	

== Sephardic and Ashkenazic Culture and Customs ==
The awards in the Sephardic and Ashkenazic Culture and Customs from 1997 to 2000, the Mimi Frank Award In Memory of Becky Levy, and in 2001, the Maurice Amado Foundation Award are presented to authors of books on the subjects.

Sephardic and Ashkenazic Culture and Customs award winners
Year	Title	Author	Ref.
1997	The Book of Jewish Food: An Odyssey from Samarkand to New York	Claudia Roden	
1998	A Time to Be Born	Michele Klein	
1999	A Drizzle of Honey: The Life and Recipes of Spain's Secret Jews	David M. Gitlitz and Linda Kay Davidson	
2000	Synagogues Without Jews	Rivka Dorfman	
2001	The Jewish Cultural Tapestry	Steven M. Lowenstein	

== Sephardic Culture ==
The awards in the Sephardic Culture category, the Mimi Frank Award In Memory of Becky Levy, are presented to authors and editors of books that explore the traditions and practices unique to Sephardic Jews.

Sephardic Culture award winners
date	Title	Author	Ref.
2005	The Schocken Book of Modern Sephardic Literature	Ilan Stavans (ed.)	
2006	Folktales of the Jews, Vol. 1: Tales from the Sephardic Dispersion	Dan Ben-Amos	
2007	Aromas of Aleppo: The Legendary Cuisine of Syrian Jews	Poopa Dweck	
2008	Greece: A Jewish History	Katherine Elizabeth Fleming	
2009	We Look Like the Enemy: The Hidden Story of Israel's Jews from Arab Lands	Rachel Shabi	
2010	Yehuda Halevi (Jewish Encounters Series)	Hillel Halkin	
2011	Ottoman Brothers: Muslims, Christians, and Jews in Early Twentieth-Century Palestine	Michelle Campos	
2012	Poverty and Welfare among the Portuguese Jews in Early Modern Amsterdam (Littman Library of Jewish Civilization)	Tirtsah Levie Bernfeld	
2013	Mixing Musics: Turkish Jewry and the Urban Landscape of a Sacred Song	Maureen Jackson	
2014	Sephardi Lives: A Documentary History, 1700 – 1950	Julia Phillips Cohen and Sarah Abrevaya Stein (eds.)	
2015	Double Diaspora in Sephardic Literature: Jewish Cultural Production Before and After 1492	David A. Wacks	
2016	Extraterritorial Dreams: European Citizenship, Sephardi Jews, and the Ottoman Twentieth Century	Sarah Abrevaya Stein	
2017	Across Legal Lines: Jews and Muslims in Modern Morocco	Jessica M. Marglin	
2018	Dominion Built of Praise: Panegyric and Legitimacy Among Jews in the Medieval Mediterranean	Jonathan Decter	
2019	Lethal Provocation: The Constantine Murders and the Politics of French Algeria	Joshua Cole	
2020	Forging Ties, Forging Passports: Migration and the Modern Sephardi Diaspora	Devi Mays	
2021	The Memory Work of Jewish Spain	Daniela Flesler and Adrián Pérez Melgosa	
2022	One Hundred Saturdays: Stella Levi and the Search for a Lost World	Michael Frank	
2023	Kantika	Elizabeth Graver	
2024	Entwined Homelands, Empowered Diasporas: Hispanic Moroccan Jews and Their Globalizing Community	Aviad Moreno	

== Sephardic Studies ==
The awards in the Sephardic Studies category, the Maurice Amado Foundation Awards, were presented to authors and translators of Sephardic studies books from 1992 to 2000. In 2001, the award's name changed to the Jewish Book Council Award.

Sephardic Studies award winners
Year	Title	Author	Ref.
1992	The Compunctious Poet: Cultural Ambiguity and Hebrew Poetry in Muslim Spain	Ross Brann	
1993	The Jews of Spain: A History of the Sephardic Experience	Jane S. Gerber	
1994	North African Jewry in the Twentieth Century: The Jews of Morocco, Tunisia, and Algeria	Michael M. Laskier	
1995	The Origins of the Inquisition in Fifteenth-Century Spain	Benzion Netanyahu	
1996	Secrecy and Deceit: The Religion of Crypto-Jews	David M. Gitlitz	
1998	The Geonim of Babylonia and the Shaping of Medieval Jewish Culture	Robert Brody	
1999	Heretics or Daughters of Israel?: The Crypto-Jewish Women of Castile	Renee Levine Melammed	
2000	Reluctant Cosmopolitans: The Portuguese Jews Of Seventeenth-century Amsterdam	Daniel M. Swetschinski	
2001	Book of Tahkemoni: Jewish Tales from Medieval Spain (Littman Library of Jewish Civilization)	Judah Alharizi with David Simha Segal (trans.)	

== Visual Arts ==
Visual Arts award winners
Year	Title	Author	Ref.
1981	Purim: The Face and the Mask	Yeshiva University Museum	
1982	Art of the Holocaust	Janet Blatter	
1983	Israel in Antiquity: From David to Herod	Andrew S. Ackerman	
1984	A Vanished World	Roman Vishniac	
1985	The Rothschild Mahzor - Florence, 1492	Evelyn M. Cohen	
1986	Synagogues of Europe: Architecture, History, Meaning	Carol Herselle Krinsky	
1987	Jewish Folk Art: From Biblical Days to Modern Times	Joy Ungerleider-Mayerson	
1988	The Jewish Image in American Film	Lester D. Friedman	
1989	A Sign and a Witness: 2,000 Years of Hebrew Books and Illuminated Manuscripts	Leonard Singer Gold	
1990	The Jews in America	David Cohen	
1991	Ketubbah: Jewish Marriage Contracts of the Hebrew Union College Skirball Museum and Klau Library	Shalom Sabar	
1992	Painting a Place in America: Jewish Artists in New York, 1900-1945: A Tribute to the Educational Alliance Art School	Norman L. Kleeblatt	
1993	The Jews: A Treasury of Art and Literature	Sharon R. Keller	
1994	Jewish Papercuts: A History and Guide	Joseph Shadur	
1995	Jewish Art	Grace Cohen Grossman	
1996	And I Shall Dwell Among Them: Historic Synagogues of the World	Neil Folberg	
1997	Judaica at the Smithsonian : Cultural Politics as Cultural Model	Grace Cohen Grossman	
2004	Diaspora: Homelands in Exile (2 Volume Set)	Frédéric Brenner	
2005	Jewish Women and Their Salons: The Power of Conversation (Jewish Museum)	Emily D. Bilski	
2007	Gilded Lions and Jeweled Horses: The Synagogue to the Carousel, Jewish Carving Traditions	Murray Zimiles	
2009	Action/Abstraction: Pollock, de Kooning, and American Art, 1940-1976	Norman L. Kleeblatt	
2011	Alias Man Ray: The Art of Reinvention (Jewish Museum)	Mason Klein	
2013	Kabbalah in Art and Architecture	Alexander Gorlin	
2015	Skies of Parchment, Seas of Ink: Jewish Illuminated Manuscripts	Marc Michael Epstein	
2017	Arthur Szyk: Soldier in Art	Irvin Ungar	
2019	Edith Halpert, The Downtown Gallery, and the Rise of American Art	Rebecca Shaykin	
2022	Let There Be Light: The Real Story of Her Creation	Liana Finck	
2024	101 Treasures from the National Library of Israel	Raquel Ukeles, Hezi Amiur, Yoel Finkelman, Stefan Litt, and Samuel Thrope	

== Women's Studies ==
Women's Studies award winners
Year	Title	Author	Ref.
1998	Jewish Women in America: An Historical Encyclopedia (2-volume set)	Paula E. Hyman	
2000	Reproducing Jews: A Cultural Account of Assisted Conception in Israel	Susan Martha Kahn	
2002	Reading the Women of the Bible: A New Interpretation of Their Stories	Tikva Frymer-Kensky	
2004	Gender and Israeli Society: Women's Time (Journal of Israeli History)	Hannah Naveh	
2005	The Modern Jewish Girl's Guide to Guilt	Ruth Andrew Ellenson	
2006	Why Aren't Jewish Women Circumcised?: Gender and Covenant in Judaism	Shaye J. D. Cohen	
2007	Feminism Encounters Traditional Judaism: Resistance and Accommodation	Tova Hartman	
2008	A Jewish Woman's Prayer Book	Aliza Lavie	
2009	Mitzvah Girls: Bringing Up the Next Generation of Hasidic Jews in Brooklyn	Ayala Fader	
2010	Memoirs of a Grandmother: Scenes from the Cultural History of the Jews of Russia in the Nineteenth Century, Volume One	Pauline Wengeroff and Shulamit S. Magnus	
2011	The JPS Bible Commentary: Ruth	Tamara Cohn Eskenazi and Tikva Frymer-Kensky	
2012	The Men's Section: Orthodox Jewish Men in an Egalitarian World	Elana Maryles Sztokman	
2013	Ballots, Babies, and Banners of Peace: American Jewish Women's Activism, 1890-1940	Melissa R. Klapper	
2014	A Question of Tradition: Women Poets in Yiddish, 1586-1987	Kathryn Hellerstein	
2015	Birth, Sex and Abuse: Women's Voices Under Nazi Rule	Beverley Chalmers	
2016	The Sacred Calling: Four Decades of Women in the Rabbinate	Rebecca Einstein Schorr	
2018	Never a Native	Alice Shalvi	
2019	Sarah Schenirer and the Bais Yaakov Movement	Naomi Seidman	
2020	The Art of the Jewish Family: A History of Women in Early New York in Five Objects	Laura Arnold Leibman	
2021	The Light of Days: The Untold Story of Women Resistance Fighters in Hitler’s Ghettos	Judy Battalion	
2022	Biblical Women and Jewish Daily Life in the Middle Ages	Elisheva Baumgarten	
2023	Between Two Worlds: Jewish War Brides after the Holocaust	Robin Judd	
2024	Holy Rebellion: Religious Feminism and the Transformation of Judaism and Women’s Rights in Israel	Ronit Irsahi and Tanya Zion-Waldoks	

== Writing Based on Archival Material ==
Award for Writing Based on Archival Material winners
Year	Title	Author	Ref.
2008	Robbing the Jews: The Confiscation of Jewish Property in the Holocaust, 1933-1945	Martin C. Dean	
2009	The Holocaust in the Soviet Union	Yitzhak Arad	
2010	The Balfour Declaration: The Origins of the Arab-Israeli Conflict	Jonathan Schneer	
2011	Odessa: Genius and Death in a City of Dreams	Charles King	
2012	The History of the Holocaust in Romania	Jean Ancel	
2013	Becoming Soviet Jews: The Bolshevik Experiment in Minsk	Elissa Bemporad	
2014	Becoming Ottomans: Sephardi Jews and Imperial Citizenship in the Modern Era	Julia Phillips Cohen	
2015	The Burdens of Brotherhood: Jews and Muslims from North Africa to France	Ethan B. Katz	
2016	Jewish Salonica: Between the Ottoman Empire and Modern Greece	Devin E. Naar	
2017	Confessions of the Shtetl: Converts from Judaism in Imperial Russia, 1817 – 1906	Ellie R. Schainker	
2018	Rescue Board: The Untold Story of America's Efforts to Save the Jews of Europe	Rebecca Erbelding	
2019	A Mortuary of Books: The Rescue of Jewish Culture after the Holocaust	Elisabeth Gallas with Alex Skinner (trans.)	
2020	Blood Libel: On the Trail of an Antisemitic Myth	Magda Teter	
2021	International Jewish Humanitarianism in the Age of the Great War	Jaclyn Granick	
2022	A "Jewish Marshall Plan": The American Jewish Presence in Post-Holocaust France	Laura Hobson Faure	
2023	Between Two Worlds: Jewish War Brides after the Holocaust	Robin Judd	
2024	The Business of Transition: Jewish and Greek Merchants of Salonica from Ottoman to Greek Rule	Paris Papamichos Chronakis	

== Yiddish Language and Culture ==
Yiddish Language and Culture award winners
Year	Title	Author
1999	Poyln: Jewish Life in the Old Country	Marek Web and Alter Kacyzne
2000	The Moscow State Yiddish Theater: Jewish Culture on the Soviet Stage	Jeffrey Veidlinger
2001	Yiddish: A Nation of Words	Miriam Weinstein

== Yiddish Literature ==
Yiddish Literature award winners
Year	Title	Author
1980	Tsṿishn shmeykhl un ṭrer	Peretz Miransky
1981	Pathways in Yiddish Literature	Hyman Bass
1982	Never Say Die: A Thousand Years of Yiddish in Jewish Life and Letters	Joshua A. Fisherman
1983	Kanader Tidisher Zamlbukh	Chaim Spilberg and Yaacov Zippe
1984	Tsu Di Himlen Arof	Chaim Leib Fox
1985	Fun Ash Un Fayer Iz Dayn Kroyn	Shea Tenebaum

== Young Adult Literature ==
Young Adult Literature award winners
Year	Title	Author	Ref.
2015	The Hired Girl	Laura Amy Schlitz	
2016	On Blackberry Hill	Rachel Mann	
2017	Refugee	Alan Gratz	
2019	Someday We Will Fly	Rachel DeWoskin	
2020	The Way Back	Gavriel Savit	
2021	Rebel Daughter	Lori Banov Kaufmann	
2022	It's My Whole Life: Charlotte Salomon: An Artist in Hiding During World War II	Susan Wider	
2023	The Blood Years	Elana K. Arnold	
2024	Night Owls	A. R. Vishny	

== Uncategorized ==
Uncategorized winners
Year	Title	Author
1949	My Glorious Brothers	Howard Fast
1959	Exodus	Leon Uris
2019	America's Jewish Women: A History from Colonial Times to Today	Pamela Nadell

== See also ==
- National Jewish Book Award
- Jewish Book Council
