= Way Back =

Way Back may refer to:

== Film and television ==
- The Way Back (2010 film), an American survival film directed by Peter Weir
- The Way Back (2020 film), a sports drama film starring Ben Affleck
- "The Way Back", the first episode of sci-fi series Blake's 7

== Music ==
- Way Back, a 2022 album by High Valley
- "Way Back" (John Conlee song), 1984
- "Way Back" (TLC song), 2017
- "Way Back", a song by Skrillex from Don't Get Too Close, 2023
- "Way Back", a song by Travis Scott from Birds in the Trap Sing McKnight, 2016
- "Way Back", a song by Yeat from 2 Alive, 2022

== Novels ==
- The Way Back (novel), a 2020 novel by Gavriel Savit
- The Road Back (Der Weg Zurück), also translated as The Way Back, a 1931 novel by Erich Maria Remarque

== See also ==
- The Way, Way Back, a 2013 American film
- Wayback (disambiguation)
- No Way Back (disambiguation)
