= Davidman =

Davidman is a surname. Notable people with the surname include:

- Eleazar Davidman (1936–2007), Israeli tennis player
- Joy Davidman (1915–1960), American poet
- Lynn Davidman (born 1955), American sociologist
