= Molly's Pilgrim =

1985 film

- Directed by: Jeffrey D. Brown
- Written by: Jeffrey D. Brown; Chris Pelzer
- Based on: Molly's Pilgrim by Barbara Cohen
- Produced by: Jeffrey D. Brown; Barbara Bryant; Chris Pelzer
- Starring: Sophia Eliazova; Lilly Balaban; Jessica Bertan
- Cinematography: Mark Trottenberg
- Edited by: Scott Morris
- Music by: Brooke Halpin
- Distributed by: Phoenix Films
- Release date: 1985
- Running time: 24 minutes
- Country: United States
- Language: English

Molly's Pilgrim is a 1985 American short film directed by Jeffrey D. Brown, based on the children's book of the same title by Barbara Cohen, who also appeared in the film as a crossing guard.

== Summary ==
A nine-year old Jewish-Russian student's experience in America where she is ostracized by her classmates and her school assignment on making a puppet based on Thanksgiving characters alongside teaching everyone the true meaning of said holiday.

== Cast ==
- Lilly Balaban as Kate
- Jessica Bertan as Classroom student
- Travis Blank as Arthur
- Robert Clohessy as Gym Teacher
- Barbara Cohen as School Crossing Guard
- Greg Donohue as Classroom student
- Sophia Eliazova as Molly
- Marcus Reboa as Classroom student

== Reception and legacy ==
Molly's Pilgrim won the Oscar in 1986 for Best Short Subject. It was also spoofed by RiffTrax on November 26, 2024.
