= Jonathan Schneer =

American historian and author

- Born: August 9, 1948 (age 78); New York City, New York, U.S.
- Spouse: Margaret Hayman (m. 1980)
- Children: 2

Academic background
- Education: McGill University (BA); Columbia University (PhD)
- Doctoral advisor: Stephen Koss

Academic work
- Discipline: Historian
- Sub-discipline: Modern Britain
- Institutions: Yale University; Georgia Institute of Technology, Professor Emeritus

Jonathan Schneer (born August 9, 1948) is an American historian of modern Britain whose work ranges over labor, political, social, cultural, and diplomatic subjects. He is a professor emeritus at the Georgia Institute of Technology. In addition to writing numerous scholarly and popular books, he has written for such publications as The Washington Post, The New York Times, The Wall Street Journal, The Atlanta Journal and Constitution, and Foreign Policy. His work has been translated into Russian, Estonian, German, Chinese, and Turkish. He has appeared often on American, Canadian, and British media. He has lectured in six countries.

== Early life and education ==
Jonathan Schneer was born on August 9, 1948, in New York City. His father, Richard Schneer (1919–2004), was a dentist with a practice in New York City, who retired to Berkshire County in northwestern Massachusetts, where he devoted himself to progressive causes. His mother, Sophie Solomonoff Schneer (1920–2009), was a modern dancer in New York City, who became a choreographer and school teacher in Williamstown, Massachusetts. He has one sister, Deborah Schneer, a photographer.

Schneer spent his first twelve years in New York City, where he attended the Little Red School House. He attended Mt. Greylock Regional High School in Williamstown, Massachusetts, from which he graduated in 1966. He earned his B.A. with honors in history from McGill University in 1971, and his PhD from Columbia University in 1978, where Stephen Koss supervised his dissertation.

== Career ==
Schneer's first teaching post was at Boston College in 1976, initially as a teaching assistant for Peter Weiler, then as an Instructor. Yale University hired him as an assistant professor in 1979. He became a full professor at the Georgia Institute of Technology in 1989, where he taught until 2018. He was an early member of the editorial board of the Radical History Review and served as an editor for many years, including three as book review editor. His book, London 1900: The Imperial Metropolis, opened his eyes to the possibility of writing for a broad audience. He has been trying to do that ever since, without sacrificing depth of scholarship.

== Personal life ==
In 1980, Schneer married Margaret Hayman, a lawyer. Upon moving from New Haven to Atlanta, she took a position as staff attorney with the Atlanta Legal Aid Society, from which she retired in 2019. They have two sons, Benjamin Hayman Schneer, an Assistant Professor of American Politics at the Harvard Kennedy School who is married to the journalist and writer Elizabeth Segran, and Seth Hayman Schneer, an attorney in Washington, D.C., who specializes in health law, and whose wife, Jihyun Lee, is a South Korean diplomat. Schneer and his wife divide their time between Atlanta and Williamstown, Massachusetts.

== Honors and awards ==
Schneer has been a Whiting Fellow and a fellow of the American Council of Learned Societies. In the UK, he has been a Beaufort Scholar at St. John’s College, Cambridge University, a Christensen Visiting Fellow at St. Catherine’s College, Oxford University, the Helen Cam Visiting Scholar at Girton College, Cambridge and, most recently, the Overbrook Visiting Fellow at University College, Oxford.

New Statesman and The Irish Times both chose The Balfour Declaration as a book of the year. That book also won a 2010 National Jewish Book Award. His book, The Lockhart Plot: Love, Betrayal, Assassination and Counter-Revolution in Lenin’s Russia, was shortlisted for the 2021 Pushkin House Literary Prize. The BBC History Magazine listed both The Balfour Declaration and Ministers of War as a book of the month.

== Books ==
- Ben Tillett: The Making and Unmaking of a British Labor Militant. US: University of Illinois Press. 1981. ISBN 978-1138331693.
- Labour's Conscience: The Labour Left, 1945–1951. Unwin Hyman. 1988. ISBN 978-1138331761.
- George Lansbury: A Life on the Left. University of Manchester. 1990. ISBN 0-7190-2170-7.
- London 1900: The Imperial Metropolis. Yale University Press. 1999. ISBN 978-0300076257.
- The Thames: England's River. Yale University Press. 2004. ISBN 978-0300107869.
- The Balfour Declaration, The Origins of Arab-Israeli Conflict. Random House. 2009. ISBN 978-1400065325.
- Ministers at War: Winston Churchill's War Cabinet, 1940–45. Basic Books. 2015. ISBN 978-1780746135.
- The Lockhart Plot: Love, Murder, Betrayal and Counter-Revolution in Lenin's Russia. Oxford University Press. 2020. ISBN 978-0198852988.

=== Co-edited books ===
- Schneer, Jonathan; Cronin, James (1982). Social Conflict and the Political Order in Modern Britain. Croom Helm. ISBN 978-0709907084.
- Schneer, Jonathan; Abelove, Henry; Blackmar, Betsy; Dimmock, Peter (1983). Visions of History. Pantheon. ISBN 978-0394530468.
