= Yariv Inbar =

- יריב ענבר
- Born: 1977 (age 48–49); Tiberius, Israel
- Occupation: Intelligence officer
- Writing career
- Pen name: Yariv Inbar
- Language: Hebrew
- Years active: 2016
- Genre: Spy fiction
- Notable awards: Hebrew Fiction in Translation award (2023)
- Website: yariv-inbar.com

Yariv Inbar (born 1977) is the pseudonym of former Israeli intelligence community personnel turned author. In 2024 he was awarded the Jane Weitzman Hebrew Fiction in Translation Award for his book Operation Bethlehem.

== Biography ==
Inbar was born in Tiberius. He studied in the IDF’s Military Command Boarding School in Haifa. In 1995 he was recruited to the IDF and served in various positions in the Israeli intelligence community until 2011.

After leaving the intelligence community, Inbar has been a consultant in the fields of intelligence work and counter-terrorism operations.

In 2016 he published his first book, המטרה מקדשת (The End Justifies). The Israeli Military Censor and the Knesset committee forbade him from publishing the book under his own name, and the book was published under a pseudonym.

In 2018 he published his second book, Operation Bethlehem. The book was translated to English by Dalit Shmueli, and in 2024 it was awarded the Jane Weitzman Hebrew Fiction in Translation Award.

In 2024 he published his third book, Behind The Trigger. The book was translated to English by Dalit Shmueli.

== Books ==
- המטרה מקדשת (2016)
- Operation Bethlehem (2018)
- Behind The Trigger (2024)
