= Wayback =

Wayback may refer to:

- The Waybacks, a 1918 Australian film
- The Waybacks, an Americana band based in San Francisco
- Wayback Machine, a digital time capsule and archiving service for Internet resources created by the Internet Archive
- WABAC machine (pronounced wayback), a fictional machine from Peabody's Improbable History, an ongoing feature of the cartoon The Rocky and Bullwinkle Show

== See also ==
- Way Back (disambiguation)
