= Norman H. Finkelstein =

American author and educator (1941–2024)

Norman H. Finkelstein (1941–2024) was an American author and educator whose books Heeding the Call and Forged in Freedom won National Jewish Book Awards in the Children's Literature category. His 2024 book Saying No To Hate: Overcoming Antisemitism in America was said by Kathleen Gianni of the Pittsburgh Jewish Chronicle to "open a necessary dialogue about antisemitism in the US by providing context as well as solutions."

== Early life and education ==
Finkelstein earned a master's degree from Boston University.

== Career ==
Finkelstein taught Jewish history at Hebrew College. Finkelstein's book Remember Not to Forget: A Memory of the Holocaust expressed his admiration for the creation of the Jewish state as a haven from persecution.

Finkelstein's 1999 book The Way Things Never Were aimed to debunk the popular notion that the 1950s and 60s were a golden time. To that end, Finkelstein cited the polio epidemic, strip-mining, pollution, segregation, cold war school drills, ubiquitous smoking and bad food. The New York Times chided Finkelstein's failure to appreciate the "fabled" Route 66 and disputed his assertion that nostalgia had labeled the 1950s a healthier era.

Kirkus Reviews described Finkelstein's 2024 book Saying No To Hate: Overcoming Antisemitism in America as "a brief, even-toned overview of American antisemitism". Publishers Weekly praised the book's "comprehensive, accessible, and nuanced" account of antisemitism in America, while commenting that its suggestions for combating antisemitism were familiar strategies, namely to "engage allies" and hold elected officials accountable. Foreword magazine described the book as revealing, sobering and empowering, with occasional strays into whataboutism. The Pittsburgh Jewish Chronicle noted that some readers "will undoubtedly be shocked and disturbed" by the book's content, and elaborated on Finkelstein's strategies for combating antisemitism: defining and identifying hate, improving education, showing Jewish pride, and holding teaching institutions accountable.

== Books ==
- American Jewish History: A JPS Guide, Jewish Publication Society, 2007. ISBN 978-0827608108
- Saying No To Hate: Overcoming Antisemitism in America, Jewish Publication Society, 2024. ISBN 978-0827615236

=== Children's books ===
- Heeding the Call: Jewish Voices in America's Civil Rights Struggle, Jewish Publication Society, 1997.
- With Heroic Truth: The Life of Edward R. Murrow, Clarion Books, 1997. ISBN 978-0395678916
- The Way Things Never Were: The Truth About the "Good Old Days", Atheneum, 1999. ISBN 978-0689814129
- The Other 1492: Jewish Settlement in the New World, Beech Tree, 2001. ISBN 978-0-688-11572-2
- Forged in Freedom: Shaping the Jewish-American Experience, Jewish Publication Society, 2002.
- Remember Not to Forget: A Memory of the Holocaust, Jewish Publication Society, 2004. ISBN 978-0827607705
- Theodor Herzl: Architect of a Nation, 2013. ISBN 978-1491715673
- Schools of Hope: How Julius Rosenwald Helped Change African American Education, Calkins Creek, 2014. ISBN 978-1590788417
- The Capture of Black Bart: Gentleman Bandit of the Old West, Chicago Review Press. 2018. ISBN 978-1-61373-995-2
- Union Made: Labor Leader Samuel Gompers and His Fight For Workers' Rights, Calkins Creek/Boyds Mills, 2019. ISBN 978-1-62979-638-3
- The Shelter and the Fence: When 982 Holocaust Refugees Found Safe Haven in America, Chicago Review Press, 2021. ISBN 978-1-64160-383-6
- Amazing Abe, Holiday House, 2024. ISBN 9780823451647

== Awards ==
- Golden Kite honor award for nonfiction, 1998, With Heroic Truth: The Life of Edward R. Murrow
- National Jewish Book Award, 1998, Heeding the Call
- National Jewish Book Award, 2001, Forged in Freedom
- Sydney Taylor Book Award, 2002, Forged in Freedom
- Finalist for National Jewish Book Award, 2024 (Education and Jewish Identity), Saying No to Hate

== See also ==
- List of winners of the National Jewish Book Award
