= Melissa Klapper =

American historian and storyteller

Melissa R. Klapper
- Education: Goucher College; Rutgers University–New Brunswick
- Awards: National Jewish Book Award (2013)
- Scientific career
- Fields: American history, women's history, modern Jewish history, history of childhood
- Workplaces: Rowan University
- Doctoral advisor: Alice Kessler-Harris

Melissa Rose Klapper is an American historian and storyteller. She is a professor of American and women's history at Rowan University. Klapper has authored books on American Jewish women's history and the history of children and youth in the United States.

== Life ==
Klapper completed a B.A. at Goucher College in 1995. Peter Bardaglio, Julie Roy Jeffrey, and Laurie Kaplan served as undergraduate mentors of Klapper. She earned a Ph.D. in history from Rutgers University–New Brunswick. Her 2001 dissertation was titled "A Fair Portion of the World's Knowledge": Jewish Girls Coming of Age in America, 1860-1920. Alice Kessler-Harris was Klapper's doctoral advisor.

Since 2001 Klapper has been a professor of American and women's history at Rowan University, where she is also director of the Women's & Gender Studies Program. Klapper specializes in the late 19th and early 20th century. Klapper served as co-chair of the Modern Jewish History, The Americas division of the Association for Jewish Studies. Her 2013 book, Ballots, Babies, and Banners of Peace: American Jewish Women's Activism, 1890-1940, won a National Jewish Book Award in women's studies. In March 2023, she became a three-day champion on Jeopardy!, winning a total of $60,100. In March 2024, she competed in Jeopardy!'s Tournament of Champions.

== Selected works ==
- Klapper, Melissa R. (2005). Jewish Girls Coming of Age in America, 1860-1920. NYU Press. ISBN 978-0-8147-4780-3.
- Klapper, Melissa R. (2007). Small Strangers: The Experiences of Immigrant Children in America, 1880-1925. Ivan R. Dee. ISBN 978-1-56663-733-6.
- Klapper, Melissa R. (2013). Ballots, Babies, and Banners of Peace: American Jewish Women's Activism, 1890-1940. NYU Press. ISBN 978-0-8147-4894-7.
- Klapper, Melissa R. (2020). Ballet Class: An American History. Oxford University Press. ISBN 978-0-19-090868-3.

== See also ==
- List of winners of the National Jewish Book Award
