= Barbara Cohen =

American author of children's literature

- Born: Barbara Kauder; March 15, 1932; Asbury Park, New Jersey, US
- Died: November 29, 1992 (aged 60); Bridgewater Township, New Jersey, US
- Education: Somerville High School; Barnard College (BA, 1954)
- Spouse: Gene Cohen (m. 1954; death 1990)
- Children: 3
- Writing career
- Notable awards: Sydney Taylor Body-of-Work Award (1980); Sydney Taylor Book Award (1981); National Jewish Book Award (1983); New Jersey Literary Hall of Fame inductee (1991)

Barbara Cohen (née Kauder; 1932–1992) was an American author of children's literature. In 1980, she was awarded the Association of Jewish Libraries Sydney Taylor Body-of-Work Award.

== Early life and education ==
Barbara Kauder was born to Jewish parents Leo and Florence (née Marshall) Kauder on March 15, 1932, in Asbury Park, New Jersey; she later had two young siblings. When Kauder was in primary school, her family moved to Somerville, New Jersey. Soon after, her father died, and her mother began improvements on the Somerville Inn, where the family lived. Kauder graduated from Somerville High School, then received a Bachelor of Arts in creative writing from Barnard College, graduating Phi Beta Kappa in 1954. Three years later, she earned a Master of Arts from Rutgers University.

== Career ==
Cohen began a career as a writer during university, at which point she wrote for her stepfather's newspaper. After receiving her degree, she began teaching high school English in New Jersey. Cohen published her first picture book, The Carp in the Bathtub, in 1972, at which point she decided to focus on her writing career. School Library Journal named the book one of the year's best. Following this initial publication, she wrote more than thirty books in a range of genres, including picture books (The Carp in the Bathtub, 1972), retellings of Biblical stories (e.g., The Binding of Isaac, 1978; David, 1995), classical literature (Four Canterbury Tales, 1987), and young adult dystopias (Unicorns in the Rain, 1980).

She was recognized several times for her work, being awarded the Association of Jewish Libraries Sydney Taylor Body-of-Work Award (1980), the Sydney Taylor Book Award (1981), the National Jewish Book Award for Children's Literature (1983), and the National Jewish Book Award for Children's Picture Book (1983). Her works have frequently been named among notable mentions for the Sydney Taylor Book Award. Her book Molly's Pilgrim (1983) was adapted as a short film of the same name in 1985; the film won the 1985 Oscar Award for Best Short Subject.

== Personal life ==
Kauder married Gene Cohen in 1954; the couple had three daughters. Cohen was an active member of her local synagogue and in the Jewish community.

Gene died in 1990, then Cohen died from cancer in her Bridgewater Township, New Jersey home on November 29, 1992. The year after her death, the Jewish Book Council named the National Jewish Book Award for Children's Literature the Barbara Cohen Memorial Award in her honor.

== Awards and honors ==
Cohen was recognized several times for her work, including being awarded the Association of Jewish Libraries Sydney Taylor Body-of-Work Award (1980). In 1991, she was inducted into the New Jersey Literary Hall of Fame.

Some of Cohen's books were included on lists of the year's best children's books, including The Carp in the Bathtub (by School Library Journal), The Christmas Revolution (by the Child Study Association), and Thank You, Jackie Robinson (by the Child Study Association and Library of Congress).

Awards for Cohen's work
Year	Work	Award	Result	Ref.
1981	Yussel's Prayer: A Yom Kippur Story	Sydney Taylor Book Award for Younger Readers	Winner	
1983	King of the Seventh Grade	National Jewish Book Award for Children's Literature	Winner	
1983	Yussel's Prayer: A Yom Kippur Story	National Jewish Book Award for Children's Picture Book	Winner	
1985	Secret Grove	Sydney Taylor Book Award for Older Readers	Notable	
1987	The Christmas Revolution	Sydney Taylor Book Award for Older Readers	Notable	
1987	Even Higher	Sydney Taylor Book Award for Younger Readers	Notable	
1987	First Fast	Sydney Taylor Book Award for Older Readers	Notable	
1988	The Donkey's Story: A Bible Story	Sydney Taylor Book Award for Younger Readers	Notable	
1994	Make a Wish Molly	Sydney Taylor Book Award for Older Readers	Notable	

== Publications ==
- The Carp in the Bathtub, illustrated by Joan Halpern (1972)
- Thank You, Jackie Robinson (1974) (Note: Thank You, Jackie Robinson (1974), R—My Name is Rosie (1978), and The Innkeeper’s Daughter (1979) are companion novels.)
- Bitter Herbs and Honey (1976)
- Where's Florrie? (1976)
- Benny (1977)
- R—My Name is Rosie (1978)
- The Innkeeper's Daughter (1979)
- Lovely Vassilisa (1980)
- I Am Joseph (1980)
- Fat Jack (1980)
- Yussel's Prayer: a Yom Kippur Story (1981)
- Queen for a Day (1981)
- Gooseberries to Oranges, illustrated by Beverly Brodsky (1982)
- King of the Seventh Grade (1982)
- Seven Daughters and Seven Sons (1982)
- The Demon Who Would Not Die (1982)
- Lovers' Games (1983)
- Molly's Pilgrim (1983), republished with illustrations by Daniel Mark Duffy (1998)
- Here Come the Purim Players (1984)
- Roses (1984)
- The Secret Grover (1985)
- The Donkey's Story: a Bible Story (1985)
- Coasting (1985)
- Even Higher, illustrated by Anatoly Ivanov (1987) (Note: Even Higher (1987) is a retelling of If Not Higher by Isaac Leib Peretz.)
- First Fast (1987)
- Four Canterbury Tales, illustrated by Trina Schart Hyman (1987)
- The Christmas Revolution, illustrated by Diane DeGroat (1987) (Note: The Christmas Revolution (1987) and The Long Way Home (1990) are companion novels.)
- The Orphan Game (1988)
- People Like Us (1989)
- Tell Us Your Secret (1989)
- The Long Way Home (1990)
- 213 Valentines, illustrated by Wil Clay (1991)
- Make a Wish, Molly, illustrated by Jan Naimo Jones (1994)
- Robin Hood and Little John, illustrated by David Ray (1995)
- The Chocolate Wolf, illustrated by David Ray (1996)
