= Joseph B. Reimer =

American author

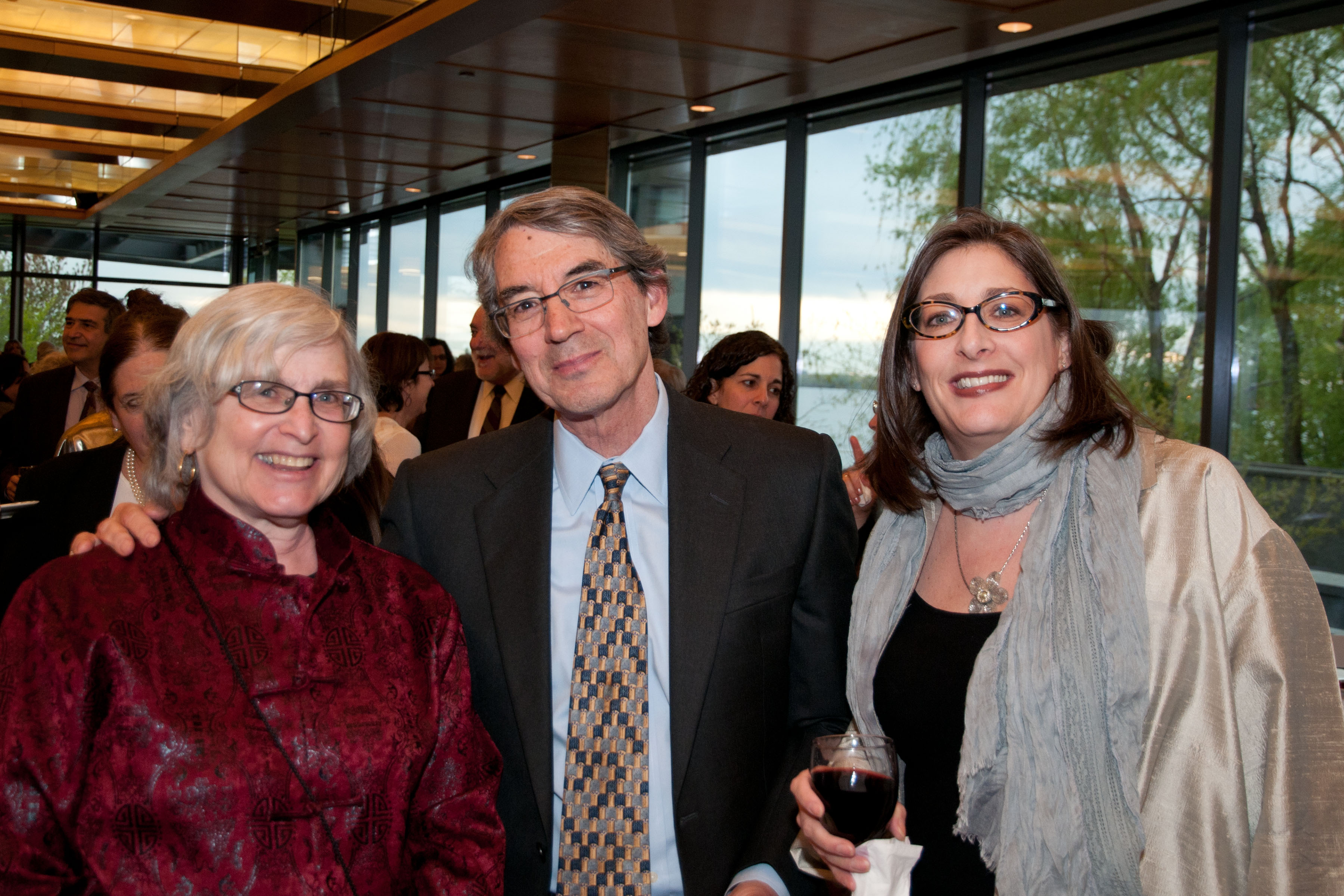
Historian Hasia Diner, Joseph Reimer and Museum director Ivy Barsky

Joseph Reimer is an American author on Jewish education and an associate professor at Brandeis University. He is part of Brandeis' Hornstein Program for Jewish Professional Leadership.

Reimer received a National Jewish Book Award in the Jewish Education category for his book Succeeding at Jewish Education: How One Synagogue Made It Work in 1997. Reimer received a Human Development Research Award from the American Educational Research Association for research on moral development of kibbutz adolescents and young adults in Israel in 1988.

Reimer has Ed.D. and MEd degrees from Harvard University, an M.A. from Brandeis University, and a B.A. from City College of New York. He is a senior staff member of the Nachson Project, a leadership program for Jewish U.S. college students held in Jerusalem.

== Bibliography ==
- Promoting Moral Growth: From Piaget to Kohlberg July 1, 1990, by Joseph Reimer and Diana Pritchard Paolitto
- Succeeding at Jewish Education: How One Synagogue Made It Work March 1, 1997, by Dr. Joseph Reimer
