= Pamela Nadell =

American historian and academic

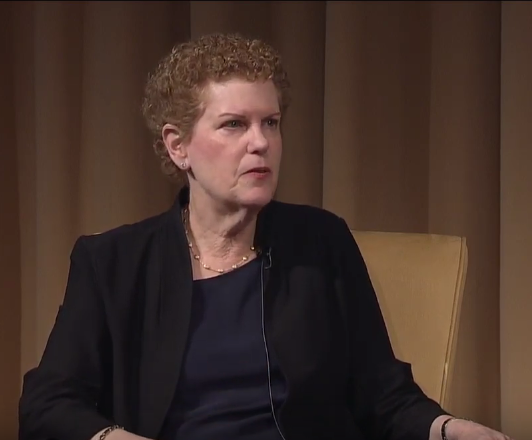
- Born: 1951 (age 74–75); Newark, New Jersey, U.S.
- Occupations: Historian, researcher, author, and lecturer
- Awards: National Jewish Book Award (2019)

Academic background
- Education: Rutgers University (BA); Hebrew University; Ohio State University (MA, PhD)
- Thesis: The Journey to America by Steam: The Jews of Eastern Europe in Transition (1982)

Academic work
- Discipline: Jewish history
- Institutions: American University; Association for Jewish Studies

Pamela S. Nadell (born 1951) is an American historian, researcher, and author focusing on Jewish history. Former President of the Association for Jewish Studies, she currently holds the Patrick Clendenen Chair in Women's and Gender history at American University. Nadell has focused her research on Jewish women and their role within Jewish history as well as in shaping the history of the United States through their role in various social and political movements.

== Early life and education ==
Nadell was born to Alice and Irwin M. Nadell in 1951 and grew up in Livingston, New Jersey. After graduating from Livingston High School in 1969, she attended Douglass College of Rutgers University, where she majored in Hebraic studies and graduated with high honors. Nadell spent her junior year abroad studying at the Hebrew University in Jerusalem.

She continued her studies at Ohio State University where she earned her master's degree in Jewish history (1976) and doctorate in American Jewish history (1982). While completing her doctorate on Eastern-European Jewish migration patterns, Nadell received a fellowship from the American Jewish Archives, and was honored by Ohio State President, Harold Enarson, for her excellence as a teaching assistant.

== Scholarship ==
Nadell's scholarship focuses on American Jewish history, especially the history of American Jewish women.

In 1995, she was guest editor of an issue of American Jewish History devoted to research about women. She subsequently edited volumes including Women and American Judaism: Historical Perspectives (2001; with Jonathan D. Sarna), and American Jewish Women's History: A Reader, and authored others, including Women Who Would be Rabbis: A History of Women's Ordination and America's Jewish Women: A History from Colonial Times to Today.

Her work brings to the fore Jewish women previously ignored in most history books. She highlights the roles women have played in changing historically set precedents. In doing so she has publicized the names of the first women to push against the established male-only rabbinates of the United States, tracing the origins of that debate in the late 19th century to an 1889 short story in the Jewish Exponent, "A Problem for Purim," by the journalist Mary M. Cohen, a member of the historic Philadelphia synagogue, Congregation Mikveh Israel.

Dedicating her work to advancing the scholarship laid down by historians of women's history, Nadell has ventured to explore the means in which women traditionally shut out of religious spaces continue to assert influence within and outside the religious domain.

In America's Jewish Women: A History from Colonial Times to Today, religion becomes only one of the commitments and activities of Jewish women. In this history, Nadell shows two threads binding the nation's Jewish women: a sense of self and a commitment to making the world a better place.

Informed by the shared values of America's founding and Jewish identity, Nadell highlights Jewish women's activism in the history of the nation they came to call home, from the 18th to the 20th century. She writes about the colonial era matriarch Grace Nathan and Nathan's great-granddaughter poet Emma Lazarus, about labor organizer Bessie Hillman, and about Supreme Court Justice Ruth Bader Ginsburg.

She discusses Jewish women's activism in the labor, birth control, suffrage, civil rights, and feminist movements. She also discusses sexual assaults of sweatshop workers during the mid-20th century, as well as the hardships many women would endure as agunot, women whose husbands cannot or will not grant them a religious divorce who can never remarry under Jewish law.

Her 2025 book Antisemitism, an American Tradition looks at the history of antisemitism, starting with the 17th century arrival of Jews to New Amsterdam. She writes about the ebbs and flows over the years, including religious tests required to hold office in various states, discrimination in housing and jobs, college quotas, legal battles and advocacy.

== Role in public life ==
Nadell has shared her knowledge of Jewish women in America with the National Museum of American Jewish History in Philadelphia, including the stories of success highlighted in the "Only In America" gallery.

After being elected in 2014, Nadell served as president of the Association for Jewish Studies from 2015 to 2017. While president, Nadell wrote an open letter to Hungarian President Zoltán Balog in opposition of the controversial amendments being made to the National Higher Education Law. The amendment would increase obstacles to universities operating outside European Union (EU) countries with sister-schools inside the EU. In her letter, Nadell expressed concern that such obstacles would encumber scholarship coming out of the Budapest-based Central European University.

Nadell penned another letter as president, along with the Association for Jewish Studies executive board to Israeli ambassador to the United States Ron Dermer expressing concern over amendments made to the Israeli Entry Into Israel Law. The law would prohibit the issuing of visas to foreign nationals who have made "public calls for boycotting Israel." For Nadell, who herself identifies as a free-speech advocate, an attempt to suppress the speech of others would be seen as a deep concern.

Nadell voiced similar free-speech concerns in 2017 before the House Judiciary Committee during a hearing on antisemitism on college campuses. The hearing would come as Members of Congress debated adding language to a proposed bill defining antisemitism as language which would "demonize, delegitimize, or apply a double standard to Israel." In her testimony, Nadell alleged that such a definition would only limit free speech, and stated that Jewish students "feel safe on campus" without restrictions.

On December 5, 2023, Nadell testified before the House of Representatives Committee on Education and the Workforce, along with the presidents of MIT and Harvard, at a hearing about antisemitism on university campuses.

== Selected publications ==
=== Books ===
- Conservative Judaism in America: A Biographical Dictionary and Sourcebook. New York: Greenwood Press. 1988. ISBN 978-0313242052. OCLC 906507190.
- Women Who Would Be Rabbis: A History of Women's Ordination, 1889–1985. Boston: Beacon Press. 1999. ISBN 9780807036495. OCLC 604018015.
- — and Sarna, Jonathan. Women and American Judaism. Hanover, NH: University Press of New England. 2001. ISBN 9781584651239. OCLC 46456219.
- America's Jewish Women: A History from Colonial Times to Today. New York: W. W. Norton & Company. 2019. ISBN 9780393651232. OCLC 1037810222.
- Antisemitism, an American Tradition. New York: W. W. Norton & Company. 2025. ISBN 9781324050643. OCLC 1490365534.
