= Ellen Frankel =

American writer

Ellen Frankel (born 1951) was the editor-in-chief of the Jewish Publication Society (JPS) from 1991 until 2009, and its CEO for ten years. She retired in 2009 to pursue her own writing and scholarly projects, as JPS's first editor emerita.

== Biography ==
Frankel received her B.A. from the University of Michigan in 1973 and her Ph.D. in Comparative Literature from Princeton University in 1978.

Frankel has traveled widely as a storyteller and lecturer, speaking to synagogues, summer study institutes, Hillels, Jewish women's groups, JCCs, museums, schools, retirement communities, and radio audiences. Among the programs she presents are Reading the Torah through a Woman's Eyes; The Evil Eye, Hamsas and Other Jewish Superstitions; Jewish Tales of Love and Romance; Jewish Ethics through Jewish Tales; From Spark to Fire: How Jewish Books Are Born; The History of Jewish Publishing in America; and Writing a Jewish Children's Bible. She also lectures on her work as a librettist of operas and other musical works.

A scholar of Jewish folklore, Frankel has published The Classic Tales: 4000 Years of Jewish Lore, a collection of 300 traditional Jewish tales; and The Encyclopedia of Jewish Symbols, co-authored with artist Betsy Teutsch. She is also the author of The Five Books of Miriam: A Woman's Commentary on the Torah, published in an Israeli Hebrew edition as Midrash Miriam. She is the editor of The Jewish Spirit: A Celebration in Stories and Art, and contributing author to the ten-volume series, My People’s Prayerbook. She is also the author of The Illustrated Hebrew Bible, and the JPS Illustrated Children’s Bible.

In 2022-23, Frankel penned a three-book series called “The Jerusalem Mysteries”: The Deadly Scrolls, The Hyena Murders, and The Passover Protocols. Frankel has published two books for young people - Choosing To Be Chosen, a collection of stories for Jewish pre-teens, and a sequel, Tell It Like It Is: Tough Choices for Today’s Teens, which she co-authored with her teenage daughter.

Frankel has also written libretti for three choral pieces composed by Andrea Clearfield: Mothers of Moses, The Golem Psalms, and Beyond the Binary, celebrating the centennial of the publication of Karel Capek’s science fiction classic, R.U.R. She is the librettist for two operas: Slaying the Dragon, with music by Michael Ching, based on the book, Not By the Sword by Kathryn Watterson; and The Triangle Fire, with composer Leonard Lehrman, based on the 1911 Triangle Shirtwaist Factory Fire in New York.

Frankel received the Myrtle Wreath Award from Hadassah in February 2000, the Bernard Reisman Professional Excellence Award from Brandeis University in May 2009 and the National Jewish Book Award in the Illustrated Children's Book category for The JPS Illustrated Children's Bible in 2009. In 2023, Frankel received the National Jewish Book Council’s Mentorship Award.
