= Nazis on the Run =

Book by Gerald Steinacher

- First edition cover
- Author: Gerald Steinacher
- Original title: Nazis auf der Flucht. Wie Kriegsverbrecher über Italien nach Übersee entkamen
- Language: German
- Publisher: Studienverlag
- Publication date: 2008

Nazis on the Run: How Hitler's Henchmen Fled Justice is a book by Gerald Steinacher that was published in English by Oxford University Press in 2011. It was first published in German in 2008 with the title Nazis auf der Flucht. Wie Kriegsverbrecher über Italien nach Übersee entkamen ("Nazis on the run. How war criminals escaped overseas via Italy"). The book was later published in multiple languages. In 2011 the book was awarded the National Jewish Book Award in the Holocaust category.

In this work, Steinacher compiles evidence from declassified International Committee of the Red Cross and US State Department documents that demonstrate the ways that the Catholic Church, the International Committee of the Red Cross and the US government, as represented by the Office of Strategic Services, the precursor to the CIA, aided Nazi war criminals in their escape from Europe and retribution for their crimes against humanity. In light of this evidence, Steinacher further analyzes why these three major institutions (the ICRC, the US government and the Catholic Church) aided Nazi war criminals in their escape from Justice. In many ways, Steinacher argues, the threat of the spread of communism provided an impulse for the US government and the Catholic Church to aid Nazis who might potentially become new allies united against communism. As Steinacher writes, "In this context, underground networks born of the collaboration between the ICRC and the Catholic Church to help Nazis escape became useful to the Allies themselves."

== See also ==
- Aunt Anna's, a safe house in Merano, Italy described in the book
- List of most-wanted Nazi war criminals
