= Peter Waldor =

American poet and insurance executive

- Born: Newark, New Jersey, U.S.
- Education: Tufts University (BA); Iowa Writers' Workshop (MFA)
- Occupations: Poet; insurance executive

Peter Waldor is an American poet. He is the author of thirteen books of poetry and a book of essays. His books include Door to a Noisy Room (Alice James Books, 2008), The Wilderness Poetry of Wu Xing (Pinyon Publishing, 2013), Who Touches Everything (Settlement House, 2013), and The Unattended Harp (Settlement House, 2015). Gate Posts With No Gate (Shanti Arts, 2018) mixes Waldor's poetry with paintings from artists around the world. His book of essays, Seven Quilts (Kelsay Books, 2022) is a meditation on Amish quilts and other textiles. Door to a Noisy Room won the Kenereth Gensler Award from Alice James Books. Who Touches Everything won the National Jewish Book Award for poetry in 2013. Waldor served as the San Miguel County, Colorado poet laureate for 2014 and 2015. Publishers Weekly praised Door to a Noisy Room as being "familial, humane, and loyal to the good people and the simple delights of this world."

Waldor earned his B.A. from Tufts University, and received an undergraduate award from the American Academy of Poets. He earned his M.F.A. from the Iowa Writers' Workshop, and served as poet-in-residence at Franklin and Marshall College in Lancaster, PA, before beginning his career in the insurance business. Waldor was born in Newark, grew up in South Orange, and currently lives in Ophir, Colorado. He is also a former member of the Alice James Books Cooperative Board.
