= Nathaniel Deutsch =

American academic

- Occupation: Professor

Academic background
- Education: University of Chicago

Academic work
- Discipline: Jewish studies, religious studies
- Institutions: University of California, Santa Cruz

Nathaniel Deutsch is a professor at the University of California, Santa Cruz, where he holds the Baumgarten Endowed Chair in Jewish Studies. He is also the Director of the Center for Jewish Studies and the Director of the Humanities Institute.

== Career ==
Deutsch attended the University of Chicago, where he received his Ph.D. as well as his Bachelor of Arts and Master of Arts degrees.

Deutsch was formerly a professor at Swarthmore College, a visiting professor at Stanford University, and the Workmen's Circle/Dr. Emanuel Patt Visiting Professor in Eastern European Jewish Studies at the YIVO Institute. In 2006, Deutsch was awarded a Guggenheim Fellowship to support his research on the Jewish ethnographer S. An-sky.

In 2007, The New York Times ran an op-ed piece in which Deutsch called for the Bush administration to take immediate action to preserve the Iraqi Mandean community.

Along with Michael Casper, Deutsch is the co-author of A Fortress in Brooklyn: Race, Real Estate, and the Making of Hasidic Williamsburg, which was published in May 2021 by Yale University Press and won the National Jewish Book Award for American Jewish Studies.

== Works ==
- A Fortress in Brooklyn: Race, Real Estate, and the Making of Hasidic Williamsburg, co-authored with Michael Casper (2021)
- The Lost World of Russia's Jews: Ethnography and Folklore in the Pale of Settlement, translated with Noah Barrera (2021)
  - Translation of Abraham Rechtman's book about S. An-sky's Jewish Ethnographic Expedition (1912-1914)
- The Jewish Dark Continent: Life and Death in the Russian Pale of Settlement (2011)
  - Translation of S. An-sky's questionnaire, written after the Jewish Ethnographic Expedition
- Inventing America's 'Worst' Family; Eugenics, Islam and the Fall and Rise of The Tribe of Ishmael (2009)
- The Maiden of Ludmir: A Jewish Holy Woman and Her World (2003)
  - Maiden of Ludmir
  - National Jewish Book Award finalist
- Black Zion: African American Religious Encounters with Judaism (2000, co-editor with Yvonne Chireau)
  - Black Jews and black-Jewish relations in the United States
- The Gnostic Imagination: Gnosticism, Mandaeism, and Merkabah Mysticism (1995)
  - Gnosticism, Mandaeism, and merkabah (early Jewish mystic beliefs)
- Guardians of the Gate: Angelic Vice Regency in Late Antiquity (1999)
  - Vice-regency of angels in late antiquity
