= The Forgotten Friendship =

Book by Arnold Krammer

The Forgotten Friendship: Israel and the Soviet Bloc, 1947-53
- Author: Arnold Krammer
- Language: English
- Genre: History
- Publisher: University of Illinois Press
- Publication date: 1974
- Publication place: United States

The Forgotten Friendship: Israel and the Soviet Bloc, 1947–53 is a book written by author Arnold Krammer, documenting the Israeli-Soviet alliance between 1947 and 1953. It was published by the University of Illinois Press on September 16, 1974.

== Critical reception ==
In History: Reviews of New Books, James B. Gidney commended Krammer for providing a detailed account of the historical events that shaped the relationship between Israel and the Soviet Union. However, he criticized Krammer's inability to explain why these events happened, which he attributed in part to the author's "unwillingness to look at long-term Soviet objectives." In The Annals of the American Academy of Political and Social Science, David T. Cattell agreed that the book fails to explain the Soviet perspective, but felt that Krammer "has done the best that is possible because without access to the Soviet archives and memoirs it seems impossible to penetrate the mystery." In a review of the book for The American Historical Review, Israel T. Naamani praised the "overwhelming mass of material" compiled by Krammer and concluded that the book is the "authoritative narrative" on the subject. On the other hand, Ilana Kass wrote in the American Political Science Review that while the book is an impressive collection of facts and figures, it ultimately "lacks a central thesis or analytical framework which might have produced a well-structured, comprehensive study."
