= Laura Arnold Leibman =

Historian and author of early American Jewish history

Laura Leibman
- Born: c. 1970 (age c. 54)
- Education: University of California, Los Angeles (PhD)
- Parent(s): Stevan Arnold; Lynne Houck

Laura Arnold Leibman (born c. 1970) is a historian and author. She has written extensively about early Jewish immigration to the Americas. Her work has received critical recognition including four of her books being awarded the National Jewish Book Award.

== Career ==
Leibman has served as the Kenan Professor of English and Humanities at Reed College. In 2023, Leibman was elected President of the Association for Jewish Studies. In January 2024, Leibman joined the faculty of Princeton University as the Leonard J. Milberg ’53 Professor in American Jewish Studies the Effron Center for the Study of America.

== Selected publications ==
=== Books ===
- Leibman, Laura Arnold (2012). Messianism, secrecy and mysticism: a new interpretation of early American Jewish life. London: Vallentine Mitchell. ISBN 978-0-85303-957-0.
- Leibman, Laura Arnold; Miller, Peter N. (2020). The Art of the Jewish Family A History of Women in Early New York in Five Objects. Bard Graduate Center cultural histories of the material world. New York City: Bard Graduate Center. ISBN 978-1-941792-20-9. OCLC 1110440656.
- Leibman, Laura Arnold (2021). Once We Were Slaves: The Extraordinary Journey of a Multi-Racial Jewish Family. Oxford: Oxford University Press USA - OSO. ISBN 978-0-19-753047-4.
- Brodsky, Adriana Mariel; Leibman, Laura Arnold, eds. (2023). Jews Across the Americas: a Sourcebook, 1492-present. Goldstein-Goren Series in American Jewish History. New York, New York: New York University Press. ISBN 978-1-4798-1931-7.
