= Arnold Krammer =

American historian

Arnold Paul Krammer
- Born: August 15, 1941; Chicago, Illinois, U.S.
- Died: September 24, 2018 (aged 77); Bryan, Texas, U.S.
- Occupation: Historian
- Years active: 1970–2015

Academic background
- Education: BS 1963, MA 1965, PhD 1970; University of Wisconsin–Madison; Diploma, 1970; University of Vienna
- Doctoral advisor: George Mosse

Academic work
- Discipline: World War II
- Sub-discipline: Prisoners of war
- Institutions: Assistant Professor, Rockford College, 1970–1974; Associate Professor, Texas A&M University, 1974–1979; Professor of History, Texas A&M University, 1979–2015

Arnold Paul Krammer (15 August 1941 – 24 September 2018) was an American historian who specialized in German and United States history and a professor in the College of Liberal Arts at Texas A&M University in College Station, Texas. He was twice a Fulbright scholar: between 1992 and 1993, he studied at the University of Tübingen and, between 2002 and 2003, he studied at the University of Jena.

He was born in Chicago, Illinois to David and Eva (Vas) Krammer. He studied at the University of Wisconsin-Madison where he earned his BS, MS, and, in 1970, PhD degrees. He came to Texas A&M in 1974 and retired in 2015, having taught American and German history to thousands of Aggies. His specialties included the First and Second World Wars, 20th Century Germany, and the Holocaust. He led numerous study abroad groups of Aggies to Germany, Italy, Normandy, and Poland. He was twice honored with the Texas A&M University Distinguished Faculty Award for Teaching.

== Principal works ==
- War Crimes, Genocide, and the Law: Historical Perspective. Contemporary Military, Strategic, and Security Issues Series. Praeger Security International. 2010. ISBN 9780313359378. LCCN 2009051995. OL 23989030M.
- Prisoners of War: A Reference Handbook. Contemporary Military, Strategic, and Security Issues Series. Westport, Connecticut: Praeger Security International. 2007-11-30. ISBN 9780275993009. LCCN 2007038895. OL 10289836M.
- Die internierten Deutschen: Feindliche Ausländer in den USA, 1941–1947 [The Interned Germans: Enemy Aliens in the United States, 1941–1947] (in German). Tübingen: Universitas Verlag. 1998-12-01. ISBN 978-3924898243. OCLC 231840313.
- Undue Process: The Untold Story of America's German Enemy Aliens. New York City: Rowman & Littlefield. 1997. ISBN 978-0847685189. LCCN 97008365. OL 662859M..
- PW-Gefangen in Amerika: Die umfassende Darstellung über die US-Kriegsgefangenschaft von 400000 deutschen Soldaten [PW prisoners in America: The comprehensive description of the US captivity of 400,000 German soldiers] (in German). Stuttgart: Motorbuch-Verlag. 1982. ISBN 9783879438020. OCLC 613462832.
- Nazi Prisoners of War in America. New York City: Stein & Day. 1979. ISBN 0812825713. LCCN 78024155 – via Internet Archive..
- The Forgotten Friendship: Israel and the Soviet Bloc, 1947–53. Champaign, Illinois: University of Illinois Press. 1974. ISBN 0252003969. LCCN 74007121. OL 5046679M.

== Awards ==
- 1975: National Jewish Book Award in the Israel category for The Forgotten Friendship: Israel and the Soviet Bloc, 1947-1953
