= Daniel Torday =

American novelist

- Education: Kenyon College; Syracuse University
- Occupations: Novelist, professor
- Writing career
- Notable work: "The Last Fight of Poxl West"

Daniel Torday is an American novelist, short story writer and essayist. He serves as an Associate Professor and Director of Creative Writing at Bryn Mawr College.

== Career ==
Torday graduated from Kenyon College in 2000 and continued his study under George Saunders in Syracuse University's graduate writing program. He later worked as a junior editor at Esquire and is currently the Director of Creative Writing at Bryn Mawr College and former editor of The Kenyon Review. His 2012 novella "The Sensualist" won the National Jewish Book Award for debut fiction.

Torday's first novel, The Last Flight of Poxl West, was published in hardcover by St. Martin's Press in 2015. The book was the winner of the 2015 National Jewish Book Award for Fiction, and was awarded the Sami Rohr Choice Prize in 2017.

Torday's second full-length novel, Boomer1, was published by St. Martin's Press in hardcover in 2018.

== Critical reception ==
"The Last Fight of Poxl West" received a glowing review from Michiko Kakutani in The New York Times and was featured on the cover of the New York Times Book Review where Teddy Wayne referred to it as an "expertly crafted first novel." It was also named one of Amazon.com's Best Debuts of 2015 and was longlisted for the International Dublin Literary Award. At the time of the book's publication, Torday was a guest on Fresh Air with Terry Gross to discuss the book. He said the novel was partially based on his grandfather having falsified government papers to hide his Jewish ancestry, in order to ensure his family's survival during World War II.

Nouvella Books published Torday's first book-length work, The Sensualist, in 2012. It too won a National Jewish Book Award, this one for their debut fiction category. His short stories and essays have appeared in The New York Times, NPR, The Paris Review Daily, Esquire Magazine, The Kenyon Review and Tin House magazine, and have been honored in both the Best American Short Stories and Best American Essays series.

== Works ==
- The Sensualist, Nouvella, 2011 ISBN 978-0983658542
- The Last Flight of Poxl West, Picador, 2016, ISBN 978-1250081605
- Boomer1, St. Martin's Press, 2018, ISBN 978-1250191793
