= A Fortress in Brooklyn =

2021 nonfiction history book

- Book cover, first edition
- Author: Nathaniel Deutsch, Michael Casper
- Language: English
- Publisher: Yale University Press
- Publication date: 11 May 2021
- ISBN: 978-0300231090

A Fortress in Brooklyn: Race, Real Estate, and the Making of Hasidic Williamsburg is a nonfiction book by Jewish studies professor Nathaniel Deutsch and historian Michael Casper, published by Yale University Press in May, 2021. It has been favorably reviewed in NYBooks, The Jewish News of Northern California, and The Jewish Journal of Greater Los Angeles.

== Contents ==
The 391-page book chronicles the history of the Yiddish speaking community of Williamsburg (Brooklyn, NY): its stringent inception in the post World War II years by a wave of Hasidic Jew immigration originated from Eastern European shtetls, its contentious relations with neighboring African American and Puerto Rican communities, and its partly reluctant but progressive gentrification by the forces of commerce and urban development. The narrative covers historic, racial, sociological, political, urbanistic, and emotional aspects.

== Critique ==
Critics from various sources encounter the book "persuasive" (Samuel Stein, Jewish Currents, 2021). "fascinating" (Zalman Newfield, New Books Network), or "delightful, compelling, interesting" (Bennet Baumer, The Indypendent). Ben Rothke (The Times of Israel) praised its "spellbinding narrative", while Gabe S. Tennen (Gothan Center) referred to the book as "detailed, crisply written, a caveat to nearly fifty years of scholarship".

== Awards ==
The book won the 71st National Jewish Book Awards in American Jewish Studies (2022) given by the Jewish Book Council, in recognition to the "impressive training, sensitivity and scholarly style" distinguishing the authors.
