= Gerald Steinacher =

Austrian academic (born 1970)

- Born: 2 September 1970 (age 55); St. Johann in Tirol, Tyrol, Austria
- Occupation: Historian
- Website: www.geraldsteinacher.com

Gerald Steinacher (born 2 September 1970) is Professor of History and Hymen Rosenberg Professor of Judaic Studies at the University of Nebraska–Lincoln. After serving at the South Tyrolean Regional Archives in Bozen, he was a Joseph A. Schumpeter Research Fellow at Harvard University during 2010-2011 and in 2009 a visiting scholar at the Center for European Studies at Harvard University. He lectured at the Universities of Innsbruck (Austria), Luzern (Switzerland) and Munich (Germany). In 2006 he was a Center for Advanced Holocaust Studies Fellow at the United States Holocaust Memorial Museum in Washington, DC.

Steinacher’s research focuses on 20th Century Central European History with emphasis on Italian Fascism, National Socialism, Holocaust and intelligence studies. He has published two books, edited nine volumes, and wrote a large number of book chapters and journal articles on these topics. His post-doctoral research (Habilitation) examined the postwar fate of Nazis, Holocaust perpetrators and the institutions, particularly, the International Committee of the Red Cross, the US Government, and the Catholic Church, that aided in their escape from Europe. The result of this research came out as a book, Nazis on the Run: How Hitler's Henchmen Fled Justice. This academic book was published in several languages with the English edition put out by Oxford University Press in 2011. The book was recently awarded the 2011 National Jewish Book Award in the Holocaust category.

== Publications ==
- Ausgrenzung in die Wirtschaft? Karrieren von Südtiroler Nationalsozialisten nach 1945, in Hannes Obermair et al. (ed.), Regionale Zivilgesellschaft in Bewegung, Folio Verlag, Vienna-Bozen 2012, pp. 270–283, ISBN 978-3-85256-618-4.
- Nazis on the Run: How Hitler's Henchmen Fled Justice, Oxford University Press, Oxford-New York 2011, ISBN 978-0-19-957686-9.
- (together with Aram Mattioli, ed.), Für den Faschismus bauen: Architektur und Städtebau im Italien Mussolinis, Orell Fuessli Verlag, Zuerich 2009, ISBN 978-3-280-06115-2.
- (together with Hans-Guenter Richardi, ed.), Für Freiheit und Recht in Europa. Der 20. Juli 1944 und der Widerstand gegen das NS-Regime in Deutschland, Österreich und Südtirol, Studienverlag, Innsbruck-Wien-Bozen 2009, ISBN 978-3-7065-4634-8.
- Nazis auf der Flucht. Wie Kriegsverbrecher über Italien nach Übersee entkamen, Fischer, Frankfurt/Main 2010, ISBN 978-3-596-18497-2.
- Tra Duce, Führer e Negus. L'Alto Adige e la guerra d'Abissinia 1935–1941, Temi, Trento 2008.
- Zwischen Duce, Führer und Negus. Südtirol und der Abessinienkrieg 1935–1941, Athesia, Bozen 2006, ISBN 978-88-8266-399-5.
- The Cape of Last Hope: The Flight of Nazi War Criminals through Italy to South America, in Klaus Eisterer, Günter Bischof (ed.), Transatlantic Relations. Austria and Latin America in the 19th and 20th Century (Transatlantica 1) New Brunswick 2006, pp. 203–224.
- Im Schatten der Geheimdienste. Südtirol 1918 bis zur Gegenwart, Studienverlag, Innsbruck-Wien-Bozen 2003, ISBN 978-3-7065-1644-0.
- Südtirol und die Geheimdienste 1943–1945, Studienverlag, Innsbruck 2000, ISBN 3-7065-1346-3.
