= No Way Back =

No Way Back may refer to:

- No Way Back (1947 film), a Swedish drama film
- No Way Back (1949 film), a British crime film
- No Way Back (1953 film), a West German drama film
- No Way Back (1976 film), a blaxploitation film
- No Way Back (1995 film), an American crime drama
- No Way Back, 1986 by Adonis, a notable early Chicago house track
- No Way Back, a 2007 EP by Norther
- "No Way Back"/"Cold Day in the Sun", a 2006 single by the Foo Fighters
