= Anna and the Swallow Man =

2016 young adult novel by Gavriel Savit

- Author: Gavriel Savit
- Language: English
- Subject: World War II
- Genre: Historical fiction, Young adult fiction
- Publisher: Knopf Books for Young Readers
- English publication date: January 26, 2016
- Awards: Sydney Taylor Book Award, Odyssey Award

Anna and the Swallow Man is a young adult historical fiction novel by Gavriel Savit, published January 26, 2016 by Knopf. The book is a New York Times best seller and received the Sydney Taylor Book Award for Teen Readers and the Odyssey Award.

== Reception ==
Anna and the Swallow Man is a New York Times best selling book. It was generally well-received by critics, including a starred review from Publishers Weekly, who noted, "Savit's economical prose beautifully captures a child's loss of innocence and the spiritual challenges that emerge when a safe world suddenly becomes threatening."

Also commenting on Savit's writing style, Booklist wrote, "Full of sophisticated questions and advanced vocabulary, Savit's debut occasionally feels like an adult novel, but young readers with the patience for his gauzy pacing and oblique plot turns will be rewarded by a moving, thought-provoking story about coming-of-age in the midst of trauma." Shelf Awareness added that the novel "has the classic feel and elegant, precise language of a book that's been around forever."The School Librarian also highlighted Savit's writing, noting, "Savit's writing is lyrical, with a haunting simplicity that renders this odyssey utterly compelling." The Guardian wrote, "Savit aims for a fable-like narrative with an omniscient narrator, but the style, alas, can be dry." They further added, "There is something contrived about the diction, as if he is striving for fine writing." However, they noted, "The novel has many coldly beautiful images, and is fully aware of the starkness of life and the bestial nature of man," emphasized in the way the Swallow Man tells stories about the world: "the Nazis are Wolves; the Russians, Bears; he himself is on a mission to find a beautiful, rare bird, which both sides wish to claim and devour."

Shelf Awareness also commented on the book's ability to co-mingle action and deep meditation: "Amidst a riveting survival story of brutal cold, hunger and chilling narrow escapes are musings on the power of words and the power of silence, the value of truth and the necessity of lies, the horrors of war, the resilience of people, love, death, the keen intuition of children, living with uncertainty." Further, they noted, "Alongside the purposeful detachment that comes with the storyteller's voice, though, is real, edge-of-seat suspense and powerful emotion."

The Bulletin of the Center for Children's Books highlighted the book's central message: "love can endure, but it must transform after chaos has consumed it and spit it out."

Kirkus Reviews called the book "[a]rtful, original, [and] insightful."

The Guardian provided a mixed review, stating, "This is a bold first novel that promises more from the undoubtedly talented Savit. Though, structurally, it is beautifully and carefully wrought, it is like a glass case, airless. Thematically, it never reaches the ambitious targets it sets itself: the climax is rushed over, and we are left as bemused about her journey and the Swallow Man as we were at the start."

The book also received reviews from The New York Times and School Library Journal.

The audiobook, narrated by Allan Corduner, received a starred review from Booklist, who wrote, "Corduner turns in a masterful performance of this debut novel about the effect of war on innocent bystanders." Publishers Weekly highlighted how Corduner adds "the lightest of accents" to moments in the book when "Anna and the Swallow Man speak in Polish, German, Russian, Yiddish, and French," noting that the accents "[flavor] the story and never overwhelming the listener." Further, "Corduner's gentle tone of voice makes young Anna come alive without resorting to high-pitched breathiness. His Swallow Man is mysterious but also comforting, setting up great tension in the story."

Accolades for Anna and the Swallow Man
Year	Accolade	Result	Ref.
2016	Shelf Awareness Best Teen Books of the Year	Selection	
2016	Publishers Weekly Best Books of the Year	Selection	
2016	Indies Choice Young Adult Book of the Year	Winner	
2016	Bulletin Blue Ribbon Book	Selection	
2017	Sydney Taylor Book Award for Teen Readers	Winner	
2017	Odyssey Award for Excellence in Audiobook Production	Winner	
2017	YALSA's Amazing Audiobooks for Young Adults	Top Ten	
2017	Notable Children's Recordings	Selection	
