= Gavriel Savit =

American writer

Gavriel Savit is an American actor, singer, and writer. His works include The Way Back and Anna and the Swallow Man.

== Personal life ==
Savit grew up in Ann Arbor, Michigan and attended the University of Michigan, where he received a bachelor of fine arts degree in musical theater. As an actor and singer, he performed on three continents.

== Selected texts ==
=== The Way Back (2020) ===
The Way Back was published November 17, 2020 by Knopf Books for Young Readers. The book received starred reviews from Kirkus and Booklist, as well as the following accolades:

- National Jewish Book Award winner (2021)
- National Book Award Finalist for Young People's Literature (2020)
- Kirkus Reviews' Best Books Of 2020

=== Anna and the Swallow Man (2016) ===
Anna and the Swallow Man was published January 26, 2016 by Knopf. The book received a starred review from Booklist, as well as the following accolades:

- Odyssey Award for Excellence in Audiobook Production (2017)
- Sydney Taylor Book Award for Teen Readers (2017)
- American Library Association's (ALA) Top Ten Amazing Audiobooks for Young Adults (2017)
- ALA's Top Ten Amazing Audiobooks for Young Adults (2017)
- American Bookseller Association's Young Adult Book of the Year (2016)
