= Lynn Davidman =

American sociologist, b. 1955

- Born: 1955 (age 70–71); New York, US
- Spouse: Neal Horrell
- Awards: 1992 National Jewish Book Award for Contemporary Jewish Life & Practice

Academic background
- Education: B.A., psychology and religion, 1975, Barnard College; M.A., religion and psychological studies, 1978, University of Chicago Divinity School; PhD, sociology, 1986, Brandeis University
- Thesis: Strength of tradition in a chaotic world: women turn to orthodox Judaism. (1986)

Lynn Rita Davidman (born 1955) is an American sociologist. She is the distinguished professor of modern Jewish studies and professor of sociology at the University of Kansas.

== Early life and education ==
Davidman was born in New York City to a Modern Orthodox Jewish family. After her mother's death when she was 13 years old, Davidman began to question her religious upbringing, which caused a divide between her and her family.

She majored in psychology and religion at Barnard College and later earned a master's degree from the University of Chicago Divinity School and PhD from Brandeis University in 1986.

== Career ==
After earning her PhD, Davidman was hired as an assistant professor of sociology by the University of Pittsburgh. While there, she published Tradition in a Rootless World: Women Turn to Orthodox Judaism through the University of California Press. The book examined why secular women turn Orthodox by comparing the lives of those at a Lubavitch women's seminary in St. Paul, Minnesota, with members of the Lincoln Square Synagogue. The book earned Davidman the 1992 National Jewish Book Award for Contemporary Jewish Life & Practice.

She was subsequently hired at Brown University as an assistant professor of Judaic studies, American civilization, sociology, and women's studies. In this position, Davidman collaborated with Shelly Tenenbaum to co-author Feminist Perspectives on Jewish Studies through the Yale University Press. Their book examined the development of feminist scholarship in various fields within Jewish studies with a focus on gender.

She was shortly thereafter promoted to associate professor and began writing her following book, Growing Up Motherless: Stories of Lives Interrupted. The book took her three years to gather data from 60 men and women from various backgrounds whose mothers died when they were 10 through 15 years old. The result of her lengthy research showed a common theme of feeling left out and religion not providing comfort in the face of loss.

Davidman was promoted to professor of Judaic studies in 2002, a role she stayed in until 2008, when she joined the University of Kansas as their Robert M. Beren Distinguished Professor of Modern Jewish Studies and professor of sociology.

At the University of Kansas, Davidman conducted another research-based book titled Becoming Un-Orthodox: Stories of Ex-Hasidic Jews, where she surveyed 40 men and women born into ultra-Orthodox Hasidic communities who had become secular. She took a sabbatical following the publication of her book.

== Personal life ==
Davidman is married to Neal Horrell.
