= Hasia Diner =

American historian

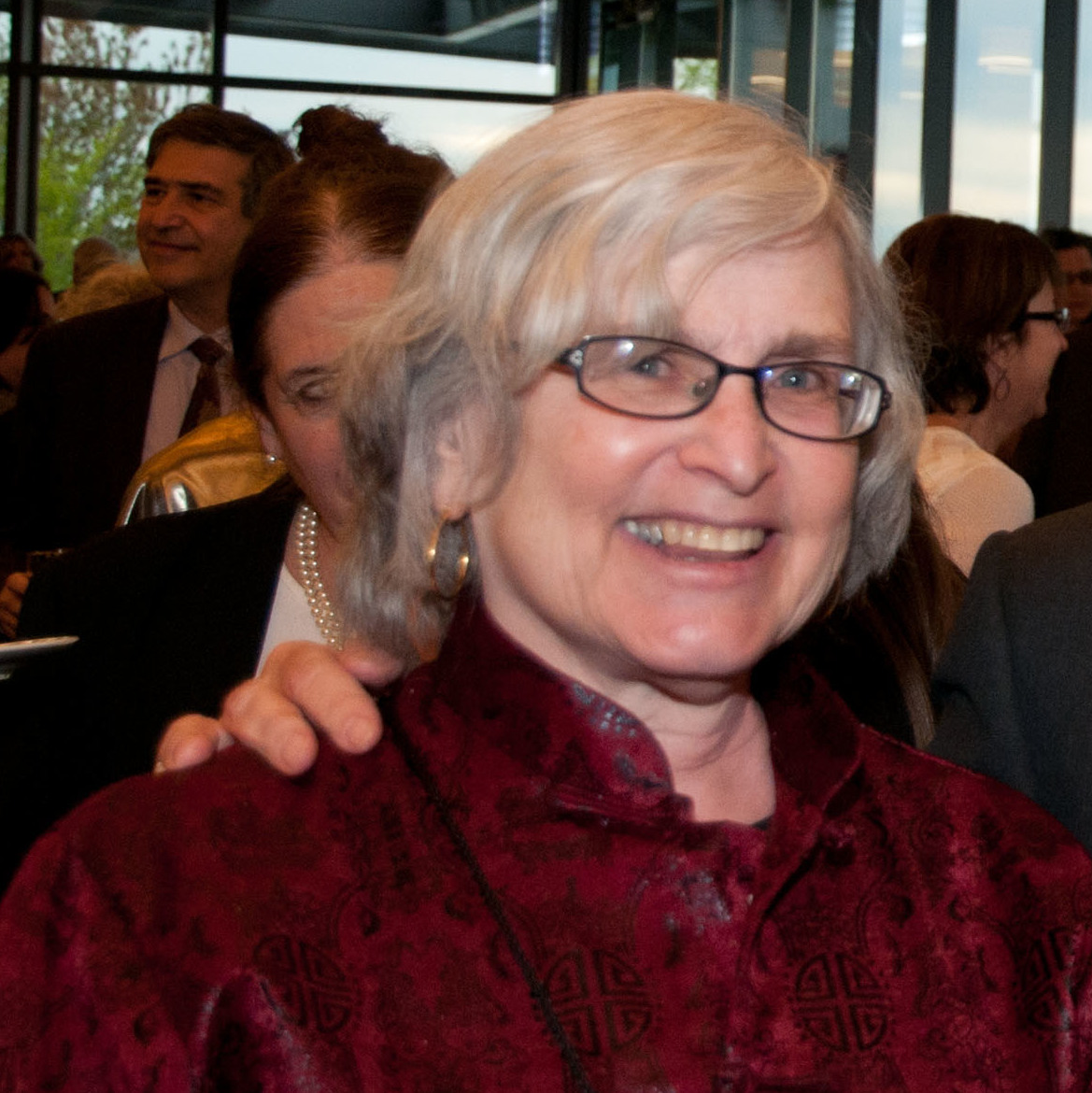
Hasia Diner

Hasia R. Diner is an American historian. Diner is the Paul S. and Sylvia Steinberg Professor of American Jewish History; Professor of Hebrew and Judaic Studies, History; Director of the Goldstein-Goren Center for American Jewish History at New York University and Interim Director of Glucksman Ireland House NYU.

== Life and early career ==
Diner received a B.A. in 1968 from the University of Wisconsin. She went on to earn an M.A. in 1970 from the University of Chicago; and a Ph.D. in 1975 from the University of Illinois at Chicago. Her PhD dissertation "In the Almost Promised Land: Jewish Leaders and Blacks, 1915-1935" was directed by Professor Leo Schelbert.

== Academic work ==
In 2002, she published Her Works Praise Her: A History of Jewish Women in America from Colonial Times to the Present.

In 2009, she published We Remember with Reverence and Love: American Jews and the Myth of Silence after the Holocaust, 1945-1962. According to Adam Kirsch, the book "drive(s) a stake, once and for all, through the heart of a historical falsehood that has proved remarkably durable. This is the notion that, as Diner’s subtitle has it, American Jews were initially 'silent' about the Holocaust—that the greatest catastrophe in Jewish history was somehow swept under the rug of American Jewry's collective consciousness."

She was president of the Immigration and Ethnic History Society 2012–2015.

Diner retired from her New York University professorship in 2023.

== Awards ==
- 2009-2010 OAH Distinguished Lectureship Program
- 2009 National Jewish Book Award for We Remember With Reverence and Love: American Jews and the Myth of Silence after the Holocaust, 1945-1962
- 2010 Guggenheim Fellowship
- 2013 National Jewish Book Award for 1929: Mapping the Jewish World

== Books ==
- The Oxford Handbook of the Jewish Diaspora, editor, (Oxford University Press, 2021)
- Julius Rosenwald: Repairing the World, Yale University Press, 2017, ISBN 978-0-300-20321-9
- 1929: Mapping the Jewish World. (NYU Press, 2013) ISBN 978-1-4798-7825-3 (Winner of a 2013 National Jewish Book Award)
- We Remember With Reverence and Love: American Jews and the Myth of Silence after the Holocaust, 1945-1962, NYU Press, 2009, ISBN 978-0-8147-1993-0 (Winner of a 2009 National Jewish Book Award)
- The Jews of the United States, 1654 to 2000, University of California Press, 2006, ISBN 978-0-520-24848-9
- Hungering for America: Italian, Irish and Jewish Foodways in the Age of Migration (Cambridge:Harvard University Press, 2002) ISBN 978-0-674-00605-8
- Her Works Praise Her: A History of Jewish Women in America from Colonial Times to the Present (with Beryl Lieff Benderly) (New York: Basic Books, 2002) ISBN 978-0-465-01711-9
- The Lower East Side Memories: The Jewish Place in America. (Princeton:Princeton University Press, 2000.) ISBN 978-0-253-33788-7
- American Jews (New York: Oxford University Press, 1998). (Part of a series for young readers) -Reissued, 2003, as A New Promised Land: A History of the Jews in America. Oxford University Press US, 2003, ISBN 978-0-19-515826-7
- In the Almost Promised Land: American Jews and Blacks. 1915-1935 (Baltimore: Johns Hopkins University Press, 1995 ISBN 978-0-8018-5065-3; reissue of 1977 edition Greenwood Press, 1977, ISBN 978-0-8371-9400-4) online review
- A Time for Gathering. 1820-1880: The Second Migration, Vol. 2 in, The Jewish People in America, Henry Feingold, ed. (Baltimore: Johns Hopkins University Press, 1992) ISBN 978-0-8018-5121-6
- Erin’s Daughters in America: Irish Immigrant Women in the Nineteenth Century (Baltimore: Johns Hopkins University Press, 1984) ISBN 978-0-8018-2872-0
- Women and urban society: a guide to information sources (Gale Research Co., 1979) ISBN 978-0-8103-1425-2
- Opening Doors: The Unlikely Alliance Between the Irish and the Jews in America (St. Martin's Press, 024) ISBN 978-1-2502-4392-8
