= The Way Back (novel) =

2020 young adult novel by Gavriel Savit

- Author: Gavriel Savit
- Language: English
- Genre: Historical fiction, Fantasy, Young adult fiction
- Publisher: Knopf Books for Young Readers
- English publication date: November 17, 2020
- ISBN: 978-1-984894-62-5

The Way Back is a young adult historical fantasy novel by Gavriel Savit, published November 17, 2020 by Knopf Books for Young Readers.

== Reception ==
The Way Back was generally well-received, including starred reviews from Booklist, Kirkus, and Publishers Weekly.

Multiple reviewers highlighted the skill with which Savit incorporated Jewish culture. Kirkus wrote, "Steeped in the rich traditions of ghost stories and Jewish folklore, this remarkable feat of storytelling is sure to delight." Publishers Weekly said the book, which is "studded with Yiddishisms ... [,] presents a bewitching allegorical adventure comprised of small, beautifully composed moments." The Bulletin of the Center for Children's Books wrote, "Savit ... builds the action with a storyteller's assured cadences, creating a story rich in elements of Jewish folk tradition and flashes of both humor and the grotesque."

Booklist also applauded how Savit juxtaposed serious topics with humor, such as when the character Death suffers a hangover. They continued their starred review by writing,

This work of prodigious imagination is especially notable in its author’s uncanny ability to create a visceral suspense that captures readers’ attention and won’t let go as the pages fly by. The book is not perfectly seamless, but it has the integrity of a wholly created alternate world populated with invariably viable characters. Not quite an epic, this will nevertheless claim an enduring place on the fantasy shelf.

The audiobook, narrated by Allan Corduner, also received a starred review from Booklist, who wrote, "Corduner is able to deftly and seamlessly whisk listeners in and under, around and through Savit’s richly drawn characters and planes of existence."

Awards and honors for The Way Back
Year	Accolade	Result	Ref.
2020	Booklist Carte Blanche: Personal Best	Selection	
2020	Kirkus Reviews' Best Books Of 2020	Selection	
2020	National Book Award for Young People's Literature	Finalist	
2020	Sydney Taylor Book Award	Notable Book	
2021	National Jewish Book Award	Winner	
2022	ALA Best Fiction for Young Adults	Selection	
2022	Notable Children’s Recordings	Selection	
