= Meryl Streep in the 2000s =

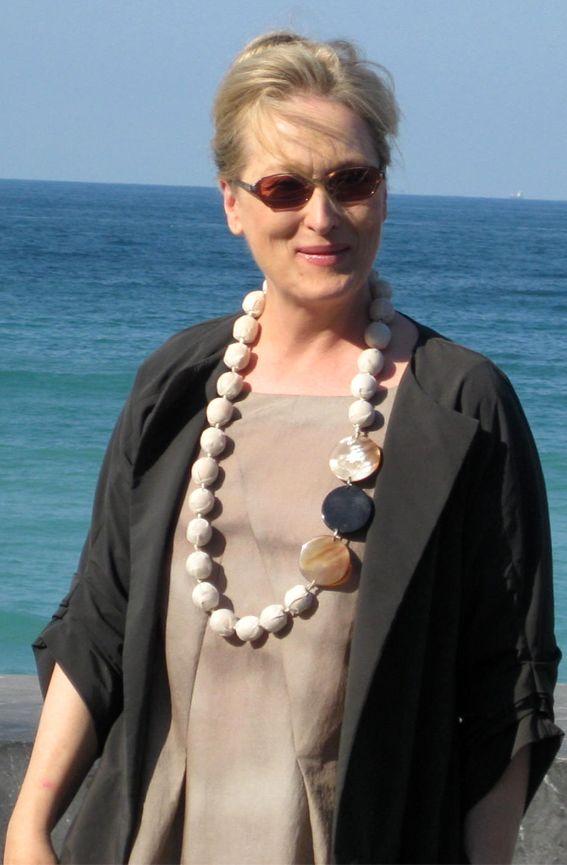
Streep at the 56th San Sebastián International Film Festival in 2008.

Throughout the 2000s Meryl Streep appeared in many cinematic and theatrical productions. In 2001, Streep voiced the Blue Fairy in the science-fiction film A.I. Artificial Intelligence. That same year she co-hosted the annual Nobel Peace Prize Concert with Liam Neeson. As well as returning to the Delacorte Theater for the first time in twenty three years, playing Irina Arkadina in a revival of Anton Chekhov's The Seagull. In 2002, Streep appeared in the films The Hours and Adaptation, for which she received an Academy Award nomination for Best Supporting Actress. In 2003, she starred in the six-episode miniseries, of HBO's adaptation of the play Angels in America, winning both a Best Actress Golden Globe Award and a Primetime Emmy Award.

In 2004, Streep was awarded the AFI Life Achievement Award, and she also starred in the films The Manchurian Candidate and Lemony Snicket's A Series of Unfortunate Events. In 2005, Streep starred in the film Prime. Beginning 2006, with the film A Prairie Home Companion, and the stage production Mother Courage and Her Children. Then she slipped into the role of Miranda Priestly, for the first time in the acclaimed The Devil Wears Prada, which Streep would revise in twenty years. In 2007, Streep appeared in the films Dark Matter, Rendition, Evening, and Lions for Lambs. In 2008, Streep starred in the films Mamma Mia! and Doubt. In 2009, Streep starred in the films Julie & Julia and It's Complicated, as well as loaning her voice to the animated film Fantastic Mr. Fox.

== 2001–2005 ==
In 2001, Meryl Streep voiced the Blue Fairy in Steven Spielberg's A.I. Artificial Intelligence based on Brian Aldiss' short story Super-Toys Last All Summer Long, first published in 1969. A CGI-driven science fiction film, initially conceived by Stanley Kubrick in the early 1970s, it revolves about a child-like android, played by Haley Joel Osment, uniquely programmed with the ability to love. A critical and commercial success, the film collected US$235.9 million at international box offices. The same year, Streep co-hosted the annual Nobel Peace Prize Concert with Liam Neeson which was held in Oslo, Norway, on December 11, 2001, in honor of the Nobel Peace Prize laureate - the United Nations and Kofi Annan. And, after a stage absence of more than twenty years, she persuaded Mike Nichols to stage Anton Chekhov's popular play The Seagull at the open air Delacorte Theater in New York, playing actress Irina Nikolayevna Arkadina. Co-starring Kevin Kline, Marcia Gay Harden, Natalie Portman, and her eldest son Henry, the play received favorable reviews, with The New York Times remarking, "Two decades in front of movie cameras haven't diminished her capacity for looming large from a stage. Streep has drawn a portrait of comic ruthlessness and gentle understanding."

In Spike Jonze's 2002 comedy-drama Adaptation., Streep portrayed Susan Orlean, a real-life journalist whose book is to be adapted by screenwriter Charlie Kaufman, played by Nicolas Cage. Streep, who declared the screenplay one of "the most interesting and ambiguous scripts [...] in a long time", expressed dire interest in the role before being cast, and took a salary cut in recognition of the film's budget of US$19 million. Lauded by critics and viewers alike, the film was nominated for four Academy Awards, including a Best Supporting Actress nomination for Streep, who David Ansen of Newsweek felt had not "been this much fun to watch in years". While Adaptation. ended Streep's winning drought at the Golden Globes, when she - after thirteen nominations - was awarded her first trophy since 1982's Sophie's Choice in 2003, she received a second nomination by the Hollywood Foreign Press for her participation in another project that year: Stephen Daldry's The Hours (2002).

In The Hours, featuring Nicole Kidman and Julianne Moore, Streep played the role of Clarissa, a literary editor who is followed for one climactic day, during which she plans a party for her long-time friend and one-time lover, played by Ed Harris, who is wasting away from AIDS. Based on the 1999 novel of the same title by Michael Cunningham, the episodic film focuses on three women of different generations whose lives are interconnected by the 1925 novel Mrs. Dalloway by Virginia Woolf. Generally well-received, The Hours was praised for the performances of all three leading actresses, who shared a Silver Bear for Best Actress the following year. Peter Travers of Rolling Stone commented, "These three unimprovable actresses make The Hours a thing of beauty [...] Streep is a miracle worker, building a character in the space between words and worlds." The film grossed US$108.8 million worldwide on a budget of US$25 million, the majority of which came from foreign markets.

In 2003, Streep appeared uncredited as herself in the Farrelly brothers film Stuck on You, a comedy about conjoined twins, played by Matt Damon and Greg Kinnear, who wish to move to Hollywood to pursue a career as an actor. Streep, who filmed her part within three days, was required to perform a musical version of Bonnie & Clyde in the film. The same year, she reunited with Mike Nichols to star alongside Al Pacino, Emma Thompson, and Mary-Louise Parker in the HBO adaptation of Tony Kushner's six-hour play Angels in America, the story of two couples whose relationships dissolve amidst the backdrop of Reagan Era politics, the spreading AIDS epidemic, and a rapidly changing social and political climate. As done in the play, some of the actors played multiple parts in the mini-series, with Streep portraying three different characters: an Orthodox rabbi, a Mormon woman, and American communist Ethel Rosenberg. The mini-series became the most watched made-for-cable movie in 2003, and garnered 21 Emmy Award and five Golden Globe nominations, winning Streep one award each.

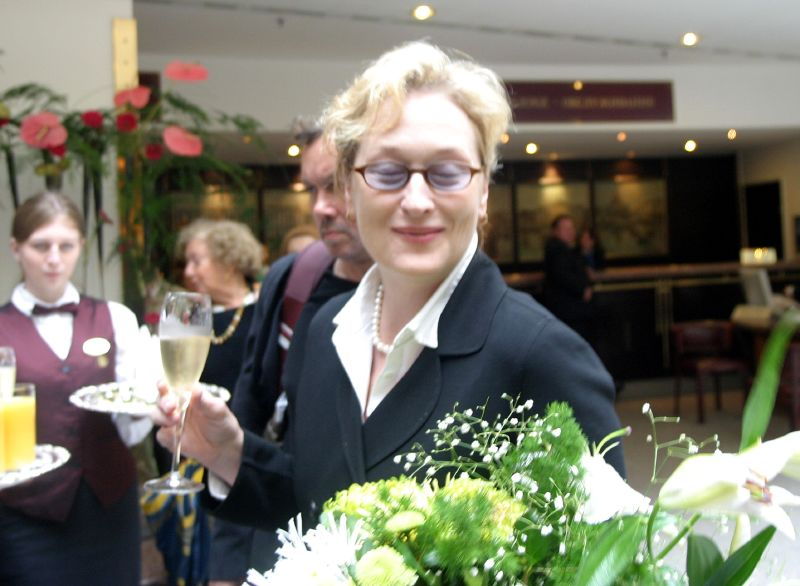
Streep at a reception in St. Petersburg, Russia, in June 2004.

In 2004, Streep became the youngest woman to ever be awarded the AFI Life Achievement Award by the Board of Directors of the American Film Institute, which honors an individual for a lifetime contribution to enriching American culture through motion pictures and television. The same year, Streep appeared with Denzel Washington in Jonathan Demme's The Manchurian Candidate, a remake of the same-titled 1962 film based on the 1959 novel by Richard Condon. Streep, who did not know the original movie prior to filming, took over a role originated by Angela Lansbury, playing a U.S. senator and manipulative, ruthless mother of a vice-presidential candidate, played by Liev Schreiber. On her Golden Globe-nominated performance, Mick LaSalle of the San Francisco Chronicle commented that, "no one can talk about the acting in The Manchurian Candidate without rhapsodizing about Streep. She's a pleasure to watch - and to marvel at - every second she's onscreen." The thriller became a moderate box office success, grossing US$96 million worldwide on a budget of US$80 million.

Also in 2004, Streep appeared alongside Jim Carrey and Timothy Spall in Brad Silberling's adaption Lemony Snicket's A Series of Unfortunate Events. Based on the first three novels in Snicket's popular children's book series, the black comedy tells the story of Count Olaf (Carrey), a mysterious theater troupe actor, who attempts to deceive three orphans over their deceased parents' fortune. Streep was cast in the role of the children's overanxious Aunt Josephine, a character she has described as "a great tremulous bird of a person". The film received generally favorable reviews from critics, who called it "exceptionally clever, hilariously gloomy, and bitingly subversive", and was nominated for four Academy Awards, winning in the Best Make-Up category. Though the film became a financial success, grossing US$209 million on a budget of US$140 million, plans to expand the film into a franchise failed to materialize.

Streep's was next cast in the 2005 romantic comedy Prime, directed by Ben Younger. In the film, she plays a Jewish New York psychoanalyst, whose 23-year-old son (played by Bryan Greenberg) enters a relationship with one of her patients, a divorced 37-year-old business-woman, played by Uma Thurman, resulting in a dilemma of two conflicting intentions. Streep welcomed the opportunity to reprise her comedic talent, though she and Younger agreed on her not consciously playing the part for laughs. Prime received generally mixed reviews, with many critics declaring it another formulaic Hollywood rom-com. Desson Thomson of the Washington Post commented that the film followed a familiar boy-meets-girl scenario, but found that Younger had turned "the routine into combustible fun", and that, "Streep, meant to be the third party here, rapidly becomes the drama's most entertaining nucleus". A modest mainstream success, the film eventually grossed US$67.9 million internationally.

== 2006–2007 ==
Streep began 2006 with A Prairie Home Companion, director Robert Altman's final film. An ensemble piece featuring Tommy Lee Jones, Kevin Kline, Woody Harrelson, and Lindsay Lohan, the film revolves around the behind-the-scenes activities at a long-running public radio show which is nearing its cancellation, depicting the show's final broadcast. Streep, initially unsure about the gestalt of the movie due to its genre-crossing nature, noted it "an odd little creature". In the film, she, along with Lily Tomlin, portrayed one half of a sister duo which was once part of a popular family country music act. Required to perform her own vocals in the film, Altman decided to cast Streep without any vocal audition. After releasing in several film festivals, the film grossed over US$26 million, the majority of which came from domestic markets. General reaction to the film was favorable by critics, who called it "a worthy swan song from one of the cinema's best", resulting in an average 81% fresh rating at Rotten Tomatoes.

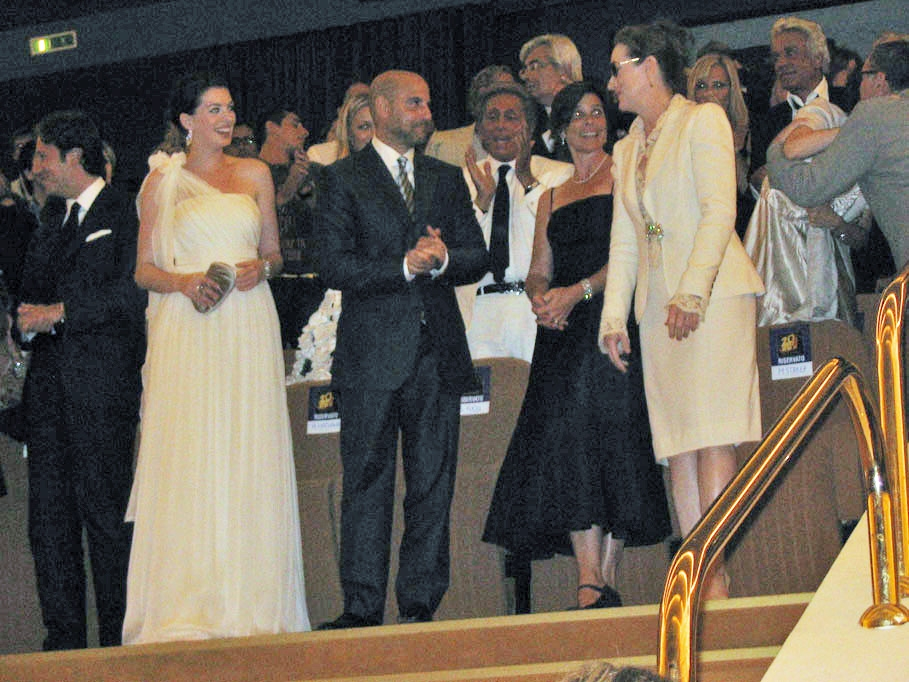
Streep with co-stars Anne Hathaway and Stanley Tucci at the "Prada" premiere in Venice in September 2006.

The same year, Streep appeared in The Devil Wears Prada (2006), a loose screen adaptation of Lauren Weisberger's 2003 novel of the same name. Co-starring Anne Hathaway as a recent college graduate who goes to New York City and gets a job as a co-assistant at the fictional fashion magazine Runway, Streep played the powerful, demanding, and much-feared editor Miranda Priestly. Though widely speculated that Streep's performance was modeled after Vogue editor Anna Wintour, to whom Weisberger had once been an assistant, the actress denied basing her portrayal on Wintour, stating that she "was just interested in making a human being as contradictory and messy as we all are". While the film itself received a mixed reception, Streep's performance drew rave reviews from critics, and later earned her many award nominations, including her record-setting 14th Oscar bid, as well as another Golden Globe. In her review for the Washington Post, Jennifer Frey wrote that, "When Streep's on the screen, she has the same effect [as her role] on her audience; she totally commands every scene." The film was the biggest box-office success of Streep's career, and grossed more than US$326.5 million.

Also in 2006, Streep returned to the New York Delacorte Theater when she starred onstage at The Public Theater's production of Bertolt Brecht's Mother Courage and Her Children. The play was a new translation by playwright Tony Kushner, with songs written by composer Jeanine Tesori and direction by George C. Wolfe. Streep starred alongside Kevin Kline and Austin Pendleton.

The following year, Streep was cast in four different films. She portrayed a wealthy university patron in opera director Chen Shi-zheng's feature drama Dark Matter (2007), a film about of a Chinese science graduate student, played by Liu Ye, who becomes violent after dealing with academic politics at a U.S. university. The project took its inspiration from a 1991 tragedy in which a Chinese physics student opened fire in two buildings on the University of Iowa campus, killing six people. Premiered at the Sundance Film Festival, and initially scheduled for a 2007 release, producers and investors decided to shelve Dark Matter out of respect for the Virginia Tech massacre in April 2007. Finally released in 2008, the drama received negative to mixed reviews, scoring an average 33% at Rotten Tomatoes. Reyhan Harmanci of the San Francisco Chronicle remarked that, "If only it weren't based on a true story. It might have been a good movie [...], but it's a tricky business, and Dark Matter does no one right by sticking to the shocking conclusion."

Streep played a U.S. government official, who investigates an Egyptian foreign national in Washington, D.C., suspected of terrorism in the Middle East, in the political thriller Rendition (2007). Directed by Gavin Hood, and co-starring Jake Gyllenhaal, Reese Witherspoon, and Alan Arkin, the film centers on the controversial CIA practice of extraordinary rendition, and is based on the true story of Khalid El-Masri, a German citizen who, in 2003, was kidnapped, interrogated, and tortured by the CIA for several months as a part of the war on terror, apparently due to a misunderstanding that arose concerning the similarity of the spelling of El-Masri's name with the spelling of suspected Al-Qaeda terrorist al-Masri. Keen to get involved into a thriller film, Streep welcomed the opportunity to star in a film genre she usually was not offered scripts for, and immediately signed on to the project. Upon its release, Rendition became a failure, grossing just US$27 million, and received mixed reviews. Peter Travers of Rolling Stone applauded the cast, but noted that the film was a "bust as a persuasive drama".

Also in 2007, Streep had a short role alongside Vanessa Redgrave, Claire Danes, Toni Collette, and Glenn Close in Lajos Koltai's drama film Evening, based on the 1998 novel of the same name by Susan Minot. Switching between the present and the past, it tells the story of Ann Lord, a woman on the precipice of her death (Redgrave), who, bedridden in body, but not in spirit, remembers her tumultuous life the mid-1950s. Streep joined not until late into the production of the film, playing Lord's friend Lila, a role she shared with her eldest daughter Mamie Gummer, who portrayed the same character at a younger age. The film was released to lukewarm reactions by critics, who called it "beautifully filmed, but decidedly dull [and] a colossal waste of a talented cast", and earned just US$12.8 million during its limited release.

Streep's last film of 2007 was Lions for Lambs, a war film drama also starring Tom Cruise and Robert Redford that takes aim at the U.S. government's prosecution of the wars in the Middle East, showing three different simultaneous stories: a senator who launches a new military strategy and details it to a journalist - played by Streep - on the edge of a mental breakdown; two soldiers involved in said operation; and their college professor trying to re-engage a promising student by telling him their story. Produced with barely a year between announcement and release, director Redford considered the movie "the tightest schedule I've ever worked with". Upon its release, Lions for Lambs received generally negative reviews from critics, with Wesley Morris from The Boston Globe writing: "It does not feel good to report that a movie with Robert Redford, Meryl Streep, and Tom Cruise makes the eyelids droop. But that's what Lions for Lambs does."

== 2008–2009 ==
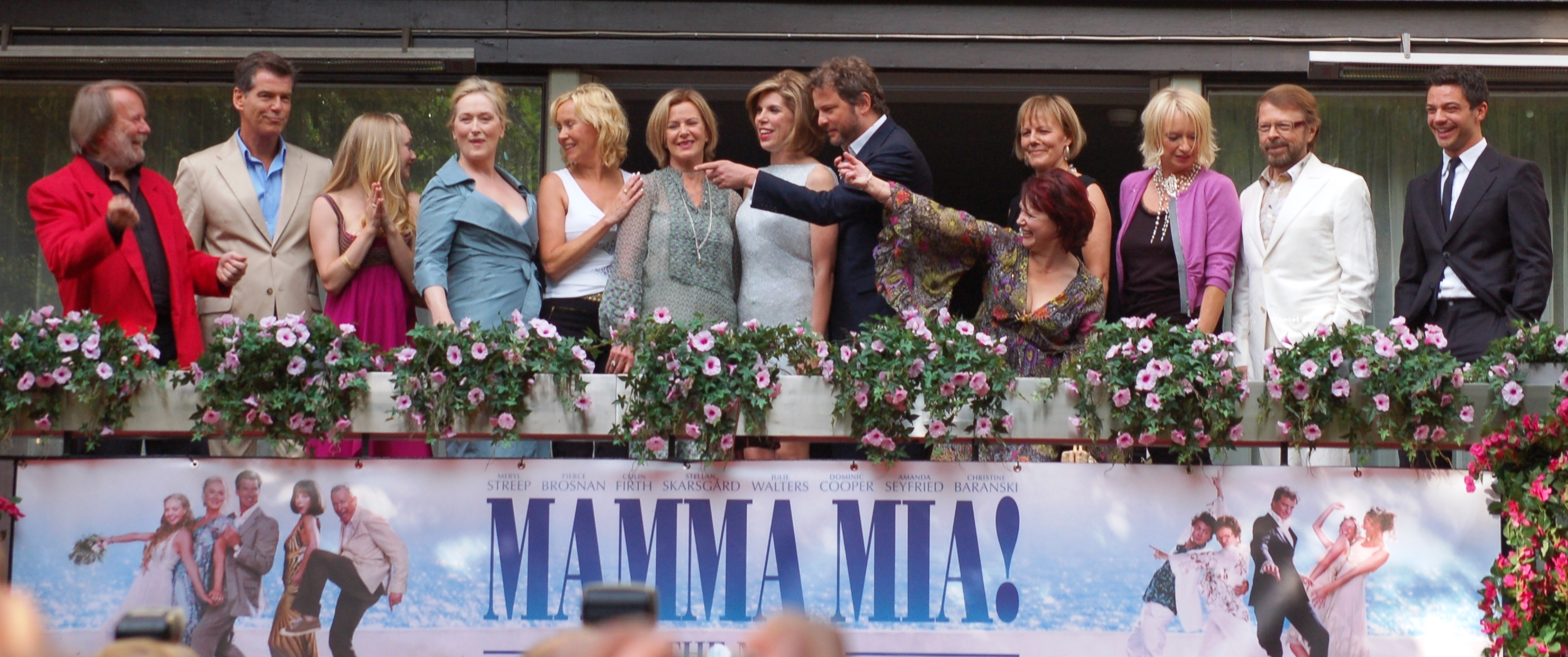
Streep with her fellow cast and all four members of ABBA at the Swedish premiere of Mamma Mia! in July 2008.

In 2008, Streep found major commercial success when she starred in Phyllida Lloyd's Mamma Mia!, a film adaptation of the 1999 West End musical of the same name, based on the songs of the Swedish pop group ABBA. Shot in England and Greece along with Amanda Seyfried, Pierce Brosnan, and Colin Firth, she played the free-spirited single mother Donna in the film, a former backing singer and owner of a small hotel on an idyllic Greek island, whose daughter (Seyfried), a bride-to-be who never met her father, invites three likely paternal candidates to her wedding. Streep, who had seen the Broadway version of the musical several years earlier, felt "absolutely flabbergasted" about Lloyd's offer to star in screen musical, though her cast was not green lit until a successful rehearsal with original ABBA member Benny Andersson months before filming. Altogether, she recorded fourteen songs for the film, including "Money, Money, Money", "Dancing Queen", and "The Winner Takes It All", some of which re-entered several music charts around the globe. An instant box office success, Mamma Mia! became Streep's highest-grossing film to date, with box office receipts of US$602.6 million, also ranking it first among the highest-grossing musical films of all-time. Nominated for another Golden Globe, Streep's performance was generally well received by critics, with Wesley Morris of the Boston Globe writing, "Indeed, Streep brings out the best in everybody. She's connecting with an audience in a way she never has - grinning, eye-rolling, bouncing, and at one point, looking right at us [...] It's an electric image that's been 30 years in coming. The greatest actor in American movies has finally become a movie star."

Streep's other film of 2008 was Doubt, featuring Philip Seymour Hoffman, Amy Adams, and Viola Davis. An adaptation of John Patrick Shanley's Pulitzer Prize-winning fictional stage play Doubt: A Parable, also written and directed by Shanley, the drama revolves around the stern principal nun (Streep) of a Bronx Catholic school in 1964 who brings charges of pedophilia against a popular priest (Hoffman). Hand-picked by Shanley, who decided on replacing the stage actors for the film, Streep used a cultured Bronx accent for her portrayal of Sister Aloysius Beauvier, a character she compared with her powerful, but dragon-like, roles in The Manchurian Candidate (2004) and The Devil Wears Prada (2006). Though Doubt became a moderate box office success, earning over US$50 million in ticket sales, the film was hailed by many critics as one of the best of 2008. Critic Manohla Dargis of The New York Times concluded that, "The air is thick with paranoia in Doubt, but nowhere as thick, juicy, sustained, or sustaining as Meryl Streep's performance [...] She blows in like a storm, shaking up the story's reverential solemnity with gusts of energy and comedy." The film received five Academy Awards nominations - for its four lead actors, and for Shanley's script. Streep also garnered her first Award for Outstanding Performance by a Female Actor from the Screen Actors Guild.

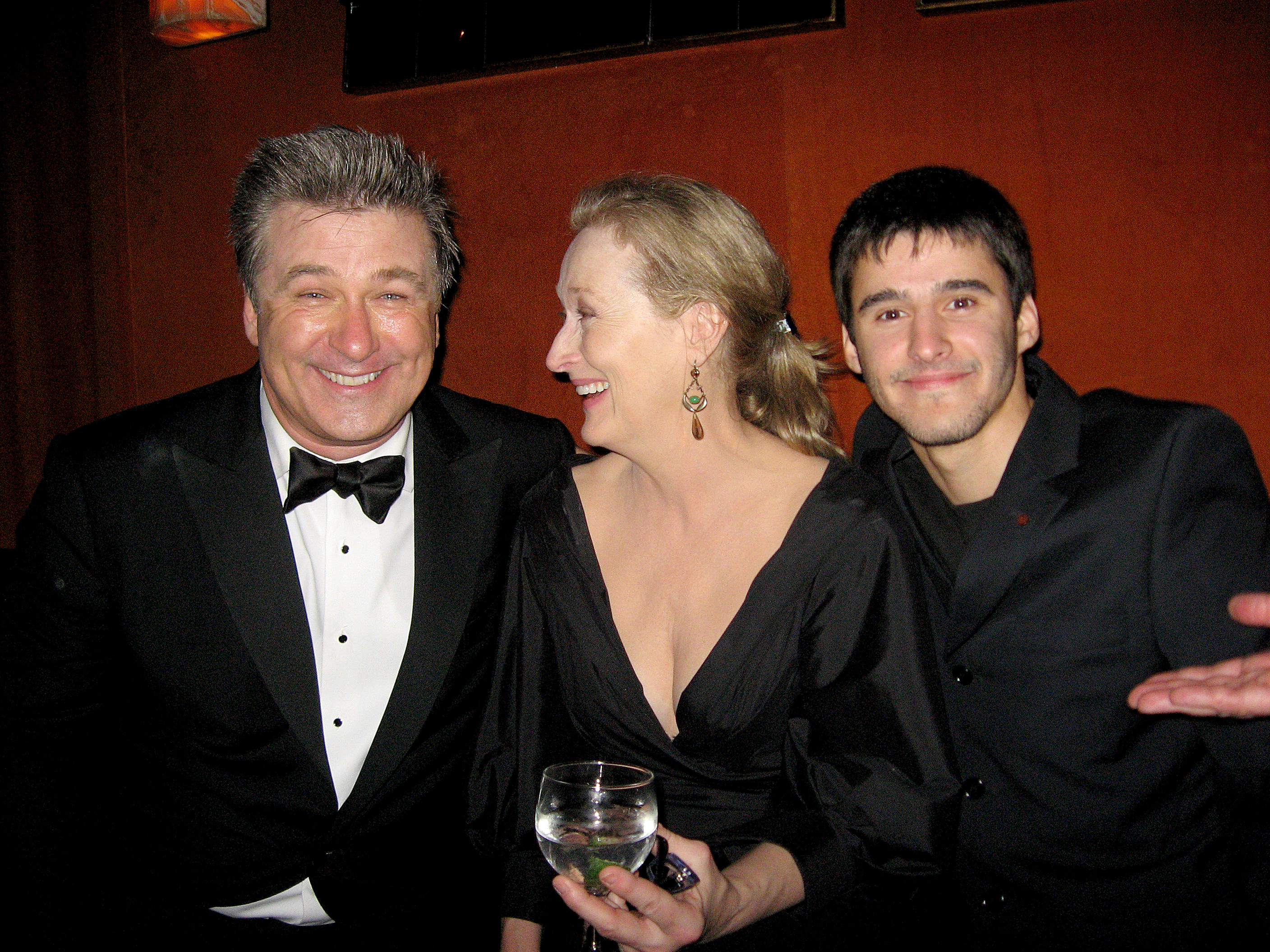
Streep with It's Complicated co-star Alec Baldwin and producer Josh Wood at the 15th SAG Awards after party in January 2009.

In 2009, Streep played chef Julia Child in Nora Ephron's comedy film Julie & Julia, co-starring Amy Adams and Stanley Tucci. One of the first major motion pictures based on a blog, it contrasts the life of Child in the early years of her culinary career with the life of New Yorker Julie Powell (Adams), who aspires to cook all 524 recipes in Child's cookbook Mastering the Art of French Cooking in 365 days, a challenge she described on her popular The Julie/Julia Project blog. Ephron's only choice, Streep, considered her portrayal both an "idealized version of Julia" and personal homage to her mother, who "had a similar joie de vivre, an undeniable sense of how to enjoy her life". Streep received universal acclaim for her performance which won her a seventh Golden Globe, a Satellite Award, and a 16th Oscar nomination. In his review of the film, critic A.O. Scott of The New York Times affirmed that, "by now, [Streep] has exhausted every superlative that exists, and to suggest that she has outdone herself is only to say that she's done it again".

As in 2002 and the year before, Streep received a second Golden Globe nomination for her cast in another project that year: Nancy Meyers' romantic comedy It's Complicated (2009). Starring alongside Alec Baldwin and Steve Martin, Streep played a successful bakery owner who starts a secret affair with her ex-husband ten years after their divorce. Written by Meyers with Streep in mind, the film was released to generally mixed reviews by critics, who applauded the cast, but declared it a "predictable romantic comedy fare, going for broad laughs, instead of subtlety and nuance". However, It's Complicated became a commercial success worldwide, collecting US$220.0 million at international box offices. For their performances, the cast was awarded a National Board of Review of Motion Pictures Award for Best Ensemble Cast the same year.

Also in 2009, Streep replaced Cate Blanchett as the voice of the vixen Felicity Fox, the female main character in Wes Anderson's stop-motion animated film Fantastic Mr. Fox (2009). Based on the Roald Dahl children's novel of the same name, the film tells the story about a fox named Mr. Fox, voiced by George Clooney, who is able to outwit a group of farmers and lives underground after stealing food from them each night. Fantastic Mr. Fox received positive reviews from a vast majority of critics, and was nominated for the Academy Award for Best Animated Feature.

Also in 2009, an article in The Independent called Streep's money-making ability the "Streep effect", noting that, "Julie & Julia, in which she plays the kitchen guru Julia Child, has already taken more than $28.5m (£17m) since its US release two weeks ago, and has sent Child's 1961 book Mastering the Art of French Cooking back to the top of best-seller lists, as well as triggering a boom in interest in French cuisine classes in the US... After the star uncharacteristically sang and danced - in dungarees, what's more - in last year's Abba musical Mamma Mia!, the highest-grossing British film ever, not only did the Swedish group's Gold collection top the album charts, there was also a surge in demand from couples who wanted to marry on the Greek island of Skopelos, as in the film, with easyJet reporting flights up 13 per cent in the months after the film's release."
