= Restoration (1995 film) =

1995 film by Michael Hoffman

- Theatrical release cover
- Directed by: Michael Hoffman
- Screenplay by: Rupert Walters
- Based on: Restoration by Rose Tremain
- Produced by: Cary Brokaw; Andy Paterson; Sarah Ryan Black
- Starring: Robert Downey Jr.; Sam Neill; David Thewlis; Polly Walker; Meg Ryan; Ian McKellen; Hugh Grant
- Cinematography: Oliver Stapleton
- Edited by: Garth Craven
- Music by: James Newton Howard
- Production companies: Segue Productions; Avenue Pictures; The Oxford Film Company
- Distributed by: Miramax Films
- Release dates: December 29, 1995 (United States); March 8, 1996 (United Kingdom)
- Running time: 117 minutes
- Countries: United States; United Kingdom
- Language: English
- Budget: $19 million
- Box office: $4 million

Restoration is a 1995 historical drama film directed by Michael Hoffman from a screenplay by Rupert Walters, based on the 1989 novel of the same title by Rose Tremain. It stars Robert Downey Jr. as a 17th-century medical student exploited by King Charles II. The film was shot in Wales and won the Academy Awards for art direction and costume design.

== Plot ==
Young doctor Robert Merivel enters into King Charles II of England's service after saving the King's favourite spaniel. Merivel revels in debauched pleasure and popularity at court until the King arranges for him to wed Celia, a royal mistress who has fallen out of favour. The arranged marriage is to fool the King's favorite mistress, Barbara Castlemaine. Merivel is given an estate named Bidnold in Suffolk, and Celia is installed in a house in Kew where the king can secretly visit. Merivel lives a life of debauchery there, but also finds pleasure in restoring the house to its former beauty with assistance from Will Gates, the estate manager. Matters become complicated when Merivel breaks the King's cardinal rule and falls in love with Celia. The King commissions artist Elias Finn to paint Celia's portrait. Elias tricks Merivel into revealling his romantic feelings for Celia, who does not return Merivel's affections. After discovering Merivel's romantic feelings for Celia, the King banishes him from court and back to his life as a physician.

Merivel rejoins his old friend, John Pearce, who now runs a Quaker sanitarium. There, Merivel meets Katharine, a troubled young woman whose husband abandoned her after their daughter drowned. Merivel and Katharine become lovers. When Pearce contracts consumption, Merivel tends his dying friend. They discover that Katharine is pregnant with Merivel's child. After Pearce's death, Merivel and Katharine leave.

The pair returns to London just as the Great Plague has hit. Katharine gives birth to a daughter, Margaret, via Caesarean section, but dies from the procedure. Before her death, Merivel promises Katharine he will care for Margaret.

As the plague continues killing people, Merivel is compelled to help as a physician. He leaves Margaret with a wet nurse, and goes into the city. He separates the sick from the well, who have all been quarantined together, and eases the suffering of the dying. When asked his name, Merivel says he is John Pearce, as a tribute to his friend. Merivel realises his life now is more rewarding and fulfilling than the one he left behind.

Under the alias "Pearce" and in disguise, Merivel is summoned to the palace, where the King fears that Celia has contracted the plague. Merivel examines Celia and reassures the King that she has a treatable fever, and also that she is pregnant. Before the King can express his thanks, the court is notified that a large part of London is on fire. Merivel races back to save his infant daughter but is unable to find her. He falls through the burning floor and lands in a small row boat below. Unconscious, he floats on the river current away from the city. He awakens back at Bidnold, being cared for by Will Gates. As Merivel recuperates, he grieves his lost daughter.

Soon after, the King and his entourage arrive. Celia suspected the true identity of the "John Pearce" who examined her, and it was confirmed when a nurse came to the palace with Margaret, urgently seeking the whereabouts of Robert Merivel. With that, the King steps aside and reveals the nurse holding Margaret, alive and well. Impressed with the man that Merivel has become, and for his courage and good work in treating Celia and the plague victims, the King returns Bidnold to Merivel, promising it will never be taken away. The film ends with Merivel returning to London, with Margaret in his arms, to establish a new hospital with the King's assistance.

== Cast ==
- Robert Downey Jr. as Robert Merivel
- Sam Neill as King Charles II
- David Thewlis as John Pearce
- Polly Walker as Celia Clemence
- Meg Ryan as Katharine
- Ian McKellen as Will Gates
- Hugh Grant as Elias Finn
- Ian McDiarmid as Ambrose
- Mary MacLeod as Midwife
- Mark Letheren as Daniel
- Sandy McDade as Hannah
- Andrew Havill as Gallant
- Rosalind Bennett as Eleanor
- Willie Ross as Man with Visible Heart
- David Gant as Chiffinch
- Benjamin Whitrow as Merivel's Father
- Neville Watchurst as Latin Doctor
- Bryan Pringle as Watchman
- Roy Evans as Fleeing Man
- John Quarmby as The Chancellor
- John Dallimore as The Secretary
- Roger Ashton-Griffiths as Mr. Bung
- Bridie and Hannah Rees-Davies as Twin Babies

== Reception ==
At the 68th Academy Awards, Restoration won for Best Art Direction-Set Decoration for Eugenio Zanetti and Best Costume Design for James Acheson. The film was also entered into the 46th Berlin International Film Festival. According to the review aggregator website Rotten Tomatoes, 71% of critics have given the film a positive review based on 34 reviews, with an average rating of 6.3/10. The site's critics consensus reads, "Restoration spins an engaging period yarn out of its bestselling source material, brought to life through the efforts of an eclectic ensemble cast led by Robert Downey Jr." At Metacritic, the film has a weighted average score of 66 out of 100 based on 16 critics, indicating "generally favorable reviews".

Peter Travers, in a favorable review for Rolling Stone, praised the film for its timely AIDS parable and described Ryan as miscast in the role of the troubled Katharine. In her review for The New York Times, Janet Maslin wrote, "Restoration crams in more research and period detail than it can comfortably digest, but its story is not overwhelmed by such overkill".

Rose Tremain, the author of the novel on which the film was based, said of the film that it had a beautiful texture to it. She was, however, disappointed with the film's storytelling, and said that the story had no logic and so did not move the audience. The disappointment led her to take up scriptwriting herself.

== Soundtrack ==
Restoration: Music From The Miramax Motion Picture Soundtrack

Soundtrack album by James Newton Howard
- Released: 1996
- Genre: Soundtrack
- Length: 58:47
- Label: Milan Records
- Producers: Michael Mason, Shawn Murphy

Composer James Newton Howard's main theme is based on the music from The Fairy-Queen by Henry Purcell.

=== Track listing ===
1. "If Love's A Sweet Passion (From the Fairy Queen)" 1:31
2. "Main Titles" 2:57
3. "Frost Dance In C (From King Arthur)" 1:34
4. "A Night With Lulu" 1:21
5. "Minuet In G (From Abdelazer)" 0:53
6. "Here The Deities Approve (From the Ode welcome to all the Pleasures)" 2:28
7. "A Creature Of The New Age" 1:09
8. "Overture In D (From the Fairy Queen)" 1:26
9. "The Wedding" 1:39
10. "Hornpipe In D Minor (From the Fairy Queen)" 1:26
11. "Arrival In Bidnold" 1:08
12. "The Cabinet Of Curiosities" 2:54
13. "The Land Of Mar" 1:11
14. "The Lie" 1:19
15. "A New Ground (In E Minor)" 0:52
16. "Merivel Woos Celia" 2:26
17. "Katharine Sleeps" 3:23
18. "Taking Bidnold Back" 1:35
19. "Muzette 1 In A Minor (From 3e Livre De Pieces De Viole)" 2:56
20. "The Right Knowledge" 2:06
21. "The Plague" 2:09
22. "Katharine's Death" 4:37
23. "Night Sweats" 3:03
24. "Hospital" 2:54
25. "Doctor Merivel" 1:50
26. "Listening To Celia's Heart" 1:39
27. "The Fire" 3:18
28. "Allegro From Sinfonia (Act II) (From the Indian Queen)" 1:19
29. "Your Child I Believe" 1:13
30. "Newcastle (Traditional)" 0:38
31. "2nd Overture In D (From King Arthur)" 1:27
