= Eda Lou Walton =

American poet (1894–1961)

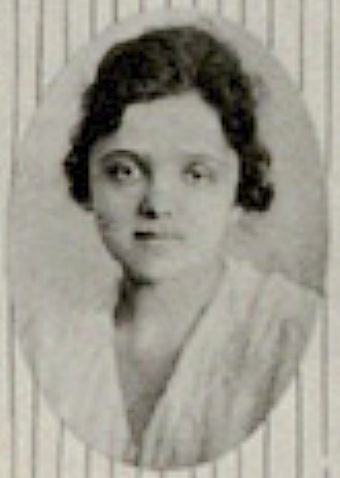
- Eda Lou Walton, from the 1919 yearbook of the University of California, Berkeley
- Born: January 19, 1894; Deming, New Mexico, US
- Died: December 8, 1961 (aged 67); Alameda County, California, US
- Occupations: Poet; critic; college professor
- Partner: Henry Roth (1930s)
- Father: William B. Walton
- Relatives: Leona Walton Neblett (sister)

Eda Lou Walton (January 19, 1894 – December 8, 1961) was an American poet and college professor. In addition to her original poetry, she studied and "recreated" traditional songs and chants of the Navajo and Blackfoot cultures.

== Early life and education ==
Walton was born in Deming, New Mexico and raised in Silver City, New Mexico, the daughter of William Bell Walton and Leoline Ashenfelter Walton. Her father was a newspaper editor and member of New Mexico's territorial legislature and its first State Senate. She studied with poet Witter Bynner and won the Emily Chamberlain Cook Prize while she was a student at the University of California, Berkeley. She earned a Ph.D. in English and anthropology at Berkeley, with the dissertation "Navajo Traditional Poetry, Its Content and Form."

== Career ==
Walton was a member of the faculty at New York University (NYU), and was close to fellow poets Léonie Adams, Louise Bogan, and Genevieve Taggard. She was also a mentor (and lover) of writer Henry Roth, and was the acknowledged real-life model for one of the main characters in his novel Call It Sleep (1934), which he dedicated to her.

Walton published several books of her own poetry, and Dawn Boy (1926), the contents of which she explained as "not literal, not even free, translations of Indian texts, but rather interpretations of Indian poetic material." Her "radical connections" and "subversive acts", including her Communist Party membership, were discussed by the Subversive Activities Control Board in the 1950s, and nearly cost her job at NYU. She later taught in brief stints at Howard University and other schools.

== Publications ==
- Emily Chamberlain Cook Prize Poems (1919, seven poems)
- "Hill Songs" (1920, six poems)
- "Beyond Sorrow" (1921, seven poems)
- "Navaho Poetry, An Interpretation" (1922, article)
- "Navaho Verse Rhythms" (1924, article)
- "American Indian Poetry" (1925, article, with T. T. Waterman)
- "Tunes in the Dark" (1925, five poems)
- Dawn Boy: Blackfoot and Navajo Songs (1926, traditional songs "recreated" by Walton)
- The City Day: An Anthology of Recent American Poetry (1929)
- "Navajo Song Patterning" (1930, article)
- "Intolerable Towers" (1930, article)
- Jane Matthew and Other Poems (1931, poetry collection)
- "Death in the Desert" (1933, article)
- Turquoise Boy and White Shell Girl (1933, children's book)
- This Generation: A Selection of British and American Literature from 1914 to the present (1939, anthology, edited with George Kumler Anderson)
- So Many Daughters (1952)
- "Younger Voices" (1954, review essay)

== Personal life ==
Walton married fellow graduate student Otto L. Tinklepaugh in 1920. Her second husband was labor lawyer David Mandel. She died in 1961, in Alameda County, California, at the age of 67. Her papers are in the collection of the Bancroft Library at Berkeley.
