= Henry Roth =

American novelist and short story writer

- Born: February 8, 1906; Tysmenitz, Galicia, Austria-Hungary
- Died: October 13, 1995 (aged 89); Albuquerque, New Mexico, United States
- Occupations: Novelist, short story writer
- Writing career
- Genres: Fiction, fictional prose

Henry Roth (February 8, 1906 – October 13, 1995) was an American novelist and short story writer who found success later in life after his 1934 novel Call It Sleep was reissued in paperback in 1964.

== Biography ==
Roth was born in Tysmenitz near Stanislawow, Galicia, Austro-Hungary (now known as Tysmenytsia, near Ivano-Frankivsk, Galicia, Ukraine). Although his parents never agreed on the exact date of his arrival in the United States, it is most likely that he and his mother landed at Ellis Island and began his life in New York in 1908. The family briefly lived in Brooklyn, and then on the Lower East Side, in the slums where his classic novel Call It Sleep is set. In 1914, they moved to Harlem. Roth lived there until 1927, when, as a senior at City College of New York, he moved in with Eda Lou Walton, a poet and New York University instructor who lived on Morton Street in Greenwich Village.

With Walton's support, he began Call It Sleep in about 1930, completed the novel in the spring of 1934, and it was published in December 1934, to mostly good reviews. Yet the New York Herald Tribune's book critic Lewis Gannett foresaw that the book would not prove popular with its bleak depiction of New York's Lower East Side, but wrote readers would "remember it and talk about it and watch excitedly" for Roth's next book. Call It Sleep sold slowly and poorly, and after it was out-of-print, critics writing in magazines such as Commentary and Partisan Review kept praising it, and asking for it to be reprinted. After being republished in hardback in 1960 and paperback in 1964, with more than 1,000,000 copies sold, and many weeks on the New York Times bestseller list, the novel was hailed as an overlooked Depression-era masterpiece and classic novel of immigration. Today, it is widely regarded as a masterpiece of Jewish American literature.

After the book's 1934 publication, Roth began a second novel that was contracted with editor Maxwell Perkins, of Scribner's. But Roth's growing ideological frustration and personal confusion contributed to a profound writer's block, which lasted until 1979, when he began the earliest drafts of Mercy of a Rude Stream (although material written much earlier than 1979 was also incorporated into this later work). In 1938, during an unproductive sojourn at the artists' colony Yaddo in Saratoga Springs, New York, Roth met Muriel Parker, a pianist and composer; much of this period is depicted in Roth's final work, An American Type. Roth severed his relationship with Walton, moved out of her apartment, and married Parker in 1939, to the disapproval of her family. With the onset of World War II, he became a tool-and-gauge maker. The couple moved first to Boston with their two young sons, Jeremy and Hugh, and then, in 1946, to Maine. There, Roth worked as a woodsman, a schoolteacher, a psychiatric attendant in the state mental hospital, a waterfowl farmer, and a Latin and math tutor.

Arthur Hertzberg credited editor Harold U. Ribalow with "rediscovering" Roth. Ribalow found him on a farm in Maine, persuaded him to permit a new edition of the novel, and wrote an introduction to the new edition, which was published by Pageant Books in 1960. Many years later, after Ribalow had died and Roth was awarded the Ribalow Prize, he wrote to Ribalow's son, Meir Z. Ribalow, "Thanks for the encomia. Things like that keep me alive, I'm sure: what little is left me capable of feeling swells with pride like the staves of an old barrel when filled. Harold, to whom I owe so much, would have been happy to witness the occasion."

In fact, Roth did not initially welcome the success of the 1964 reprint of Call It Sleep, valuing his privacy instead. But his writing block slowly began to break. In 1968, after Muriel's retirement from the Maine state school system, the couple moved to a trailer home in Albuquerque, New Mexico, closer to where Roth had stayed as writer-in-residence at the D. H. Lawrence ranch outside of Taos. Muriel began composing music again, while Roth collaborated with his friend and Italian translator Mario Materassi to put out a collection of essays called Shifting Landscape, published by the Jewish Publication Society in 1987. After Muriel's death, in 1990, Roth moved into a ramshackle former funeral parlor and occupied himself with revising the final volumes of his monumental work, Mercy of a Rude Stream. It has been alleged that the incestuous relationships between the protagonist, a sister, and a cousin in Mercy of a Rude Stream are autobiographical. Roth's sister, however, has denied that such events occurred.

Roth failed to garner the acclaim some say he deserves, perhaps because after the publication of Call It Sleep he failed to produce another novel for 60 years. He attributed his massive writer's block to personal problems, such as depression, and to political conflicts, including his disillusionment with Communism. At other times, he cited his early break with Judaism and his obsessive sexual preoccupations as probable causes. Roth died in Albuquerque, New Mexico, in 1995.

The character E. I. Lonoff in Philip Roth's Zuckerman novels (The Ghost Writer and Exit Ghost in this case), is a composite of Roth, Bernard Malamud and fictional elements.

== Works and writing ==
=== Call It Sleep ===
Published in 1934, Call It Sleep centers on the turbulent experiences of a young boy, David Schearl, growing up in the Jewish immigrant slum of New York's Lower East Side in the early 20th century.

=== Mercy of a Rude Stream ===
Mercy of a Rude Stream is a monumental epic published in four volumes. It follows protagonist Ira Stigman from his family's arrival in Jewish-Irish Harlem in 1914 to the night before Thanksgiving in 1927, when Ira decides to leave the family tenement and move in with Edith Welles. According to critic David Mehegan, Roth's Mercy represents a "landmark of the American literary century".

The first volume, A Star Shines over Mt. Morris Park was published in 1994 by St. Martin's Press and the second volume, called A Diving Rock on the Hudson, appeared from St. Martin's in 1995. In A Diving Rock on the Hudson, "Roth writes graphically about the sexual relationship between the protagonist, Ira Stigman, and Stigman's sister, Minnie, as teen-agers. Roth also describes an incestuous relationship between Stigman and his cousin, Stella." Roth's sister "chastise[d] Roth for writing about the 'revelation'" and "threaten[ed] to sue him and St. Martin's Press.... Roth and his sister entered into a contract in which he agreed to pay his sister $10,000 in exchange for immunity from legal action. The contract ... also stipulated that future volumes of Roth's novel would no longer portray Minnie Stigman 'as having any further sexual relationship with her brother, Ira Stigman.'"

From Bondage, which appeared in hardcover in 1996, was the first volume of the four Mercy books to appear posthumously. Requiem for Harlem, the fourth and final volume, appeared in 1998. Roth was able to revise both the third and fourth volumes in 1994 and 1995 with the help of his assistant, Felicia Steele, shortly before his death.

Before his death, Roth commented numerous times that Mercy of a Rude Stream comprised six volumes. In fact, Roth did write six separate books. He called the first four "Batch One," and the last two, "Batch Two." Roth's editor at St. Martin's, Robert Weil (editor), along with Felicia Steele, Larry Fox, and Roth's agent, Roslyn Targ, found the epic would be best served in four volumes, as the four books of "Batch One" contained a stylistic and thematic unity inconsistent with the remaining two books.

Explaining the difference between Mercy of a Rude Stream and Call It Sleep, critic Mario Materassi, Roth's longtime friend, argues that "Call It Sleep can be read as a vehicle through which, soon after breaking away from his family and his tradition, young Roth used some of the fragments of his childhood to shore up the ruins of what he already felt was a disconnected self. Forty-five years later, Roth embarked on another attempt to bring some retrospective order to his life's confusion: Mercy of a Rude Stream, which he has long called a 'continuum,' can be read as a final, monumental effort on the part of the elderly author to come to terms with the pattern of rupture and discontinuity that has marked his life".

Fran Lebowitz, writer and public intellectual, in her Netflix special "Pretend It's a City" speaks about how you can still appreciate the art of an individual separate from his actions.

=== An American Type ===
Roth's final novel, An American Type, emerged from "Batch 2," which Roth wrote during the late 1980s and early 1990s. With his assistant's help, Roth produced 1,900 typed pages of scenes beginning where Mercy left off and continuing through 1990. The manuscript of "Batch 2" remained untouched for over a decade until Weil sent it to The New Yorker, which published two excerpts from "Batch 2" in the summer of 2006 under the titles "God the Novelist" and "Freight." At The New Yorker the book came into the hands of Willing Davidson, then a young assistant in the magazine's fiction department. At the suggestion of Weil and Roth's literary executor, Lawrence Fox, Davidson edited "Batch 2" into An American Type, which was published by W.W. Norton in 2010.

Both a love story and a lamentation, the novel opens in 1938, and reintroduces us to Ira Stigman of the Mercy cycle, a thirty-two-year-old "slum-born Yiddle" eager to assimilate but traumatized by his impoverished immigrant past. Restless with his lover and literary mentor, English professor Edith Welles, Ira journeys to Yaddo, where he meets M (who only appeared in the old man's reveries in the Mercy series), a blond, aristocratic pianist whose "calm, Anglo-Saxon radiance" engages him.

The ensuing romantic crisis, as well as the conflict between his ghetto Jewish roots and the bourgeois comforts of Manhattan, forces Ira to abandon his paramour's Greenwich Village apartment and set out with an illiterate, boorish Communist on a quest for the promise of the American West. But feeling like a total failure in LA, Ira begins an epic journey home, thumbing rides from truckers and riding the rails with hobos through the Dust Bowl. Ira only knows that he must return to M, the woman he truly loves.

Sixty-five pages of excerpts from Batch Two consisting of short journal entries appeared in the journal, Fiction, Number 57, in 2011. The majority of these pages are about Roth's move to Maine, afraid that his associations with the Communist Party would haunt him at his factory job in Massachusetts. Purchasing a small farm, and surrounded by Yankee neighbors, Roth questions his identity as a Jew and struggles to wrest a living out of a Maine countryside where the soil is so hard that he has to dynamite in order to lay pipe deep enough to avoid the winter freezes. The extreme cold that he and his family endured, his work logging, bargaining over antiques and livestock with neighbors, and the world of backwoods and village America form the principal and unlikely drama of these pages. There is also return to the tense, incestuous world of the Roth family in Henry's childhood in the last of these extracts.

=== Themes ===
Henry Roth's writing centers on immigrant experience, particularly a Jewish-American experience in Depression-era America. He has also been hailed as a chronicler of New York City life.

Roth's work reveals an obsession with cultural depravity: the internal dislocation of the intellectual and of society at large that features so prominently in the work of the greatest Modernist writers. Indeed, Roth often fixates on human depravity in a multitude of forms. Sexually abhorrent acts such as incest, infidelity, and predation, for instance, inform much of his work, as does a more general climate of violence or abuse, often inflicted on others and masochistically turned inwards.

Throughout his life, Roth simultaneously embraced and rejected the notion of a forgiving God, and this ambivalence is also registered in his writing. Mario Materassi suggests, in "Shifting Urbanscape: Roth's 'Private' New York," that Roth "has never been interested in any story other than the anguished one of a man who, throughout his life, has contradicted each of his previously held positions and beliefs."

While Roth's works are generally tragic, and often relentlessly so, his later work holds out for the possibility of redemption, or of mercy in a rude stream. This notion is especially evident in An American Type where the love between Ira and M becomes a means of transcendence.

== Awards and honors ==
Roth received two honorary doctorates, one from the University of New Mexico and one from the Hebrew Union College–Jewish Institute of Religion. He won the 1987 International Nonino Prize in Italy. Posthumously, he was honored in 1995 with the Hadassah Harold Ribalow Lifetime Achievement Award and by the Museum of the City of New York with Manhattan Borough President Ruth Messinger having named February 29, 1996, as "Henry Roth Day" in New York City. From Bondage was cited by the National Book Critics Circle as being a finalist for its Fiction Prize in 1997, and it was in that same year that Henry Roth won the first Isaac Bashevis Singer Prize in Literature for From Bondage, an award put out by The Forward Foundation. In 2005, ten years after Roth's death, the first full biography of his life, the prize-winning Redemption: The Life of Henry Roth, by literary scholar Steven G. Kellman, was published, followed in 2006 by Henry Roth's centenary, which was marked by a literary tribute at the New York Public Library, sponsored by CCNY and organized by Lawrence I. Fox, Roth's literary executor.

== Bibliography ==
- Call It Sleep (1934)
- "Where My Sympathy Lies," The New Masses, vol. 22, no. 10 (March 2, 1937), pg. 9.—extols and justifies the Moscow Trials.
- Nature's First Green (1979)
- Shifting Landscape: A Composite, 1925–1987 (1987)
- Mercy of a Rude Stream Vol. 1: A Star Shines Over Mt. Morris Park (1994)
- Mercy of a Rude Stream Vol. 2: A Diving Rock on the Hudson (1995)
- Mercy of a Rude Stream Vol. 3: From Bondage (1996)
- Mercy of a Rude Stream Vol. 4: Requiem for Harlem (1998)
- An American Type (2010)

== Literature ==
- Leonard Michaels, "The Long Comeback of Henry Roth: Call it Miraculous," New York Times Book Review, August 15, 1993
- Steven G. Kellman, Redemption: The Life of Henry Roth (W.W. Norton, 2005).
- Lyons, Bonnie (1976). Henry Roth, the man and his work. New York: Cooper Square Publishers. p. 182. ISBN 0-8154-0516-2. LCCN 76029874. OCLC 2464583.
- Gibbs, Alan, Henry Roth's Semi-Autobiographical Tetralogy, Mercy of a Rude Stream: The Second Career of an American Novelist (Mellen Press, 2008).
- New Yorker Magazine, August, 2005
- New Yorker Magazine, May 29, 2006
- Weil, Robert. "Editor's Afterword." Requiem for Harlem. (St. Martin's, 1998): 273–282
- Holder, Douglas S. "Food as a symbol of the conflict of assimilation and alienation in the fiction of Henry Roth" / Harvard University Archives/ Harvard Depository HU 88.25.1997. 24 May 1997.
- Roth, Henry (2011). "First Years in Maine." Fiction (57): 35–99.
- Mirsky, Mark Jay (2011). "Introduction to Henry Roth." Fiction (57): 29–34.
