= Carol Neblett =

American soprano

- Born: February 1, 1946; Modesto, California, U.S.
- Died: November 23, 2017 (aged 71); Los Angeles, California, U.S.
- Occupation: Operatic soprano
- Years active: 1969–2017
- Relatives: Leona Walton Neblett (grandmother); William B. Walton (great-grandfather)

Carol Lee Neblett (February 1, 1946 – November 23, 2017) was an American operatic soprano.

== Life and career ==
Neblett was born in Modesto, California and raised in Redondo Beach. She studied at the University of California, Los Angeles. In 1969 she made her operatic debut with the New York City Opera, playing the part of Musetta in Puccini's La bohème. With that company, she continued to sing many leading roles, in Mefistofele (with Norman Treigle), Prince Igor (conducted by Julius Rudel), Faust, Manon, Louise (opposite John Alexander, later Harry Theyard), La traviata, Le coq d'or, Carmen (as Micaëla, with Joy Davidson, staged by Tito Capobianco), The Marriage of Figaro (as the Contessa Almaviva, with Michael Devlin and Susanne Marsee), Don Giovanni (as Donna Elvira), L'incoronazione di Poppea (with Alan Titus as Nerone), Ariadne auf Naxos (directed by Sarah Caldwell), and Erich Wolfgang Korngold's Die tote Stadt (in Frank Corsaro's production).

Her brief nude scene in a 1973 staging of Massenet's Thaïs, for the New Orleans Opera Association, made international headlines. In 1976, she performed Tosca, with Luciano Pavarotti, at the Lyric Opera of Chicago. In 1977, she sang the part of Minnie in La fanciulla del West (one of her great successes), with Plácido Domingo, for Queen Elizabeth II's 25th Jubilee Celebration at Covent Garden.

In 1979, she made her Metropolitan Opera debut as Senta in The Flying Dutchman, in Jean-Pierre Ponnelle's production, opposite José van Dam.

She sang with the Met until 1993, in such operas as Tosca, La bohème, Un ballo in maschera (with Carlo Bergonzi), Don Giovanni, Manon Lescaut, Falstaff (with Giuseppe Taddei), and La fanciulla del West.

During her career, she sang all over the world, including in San Francisco, Chicago, Los Angeles, New York City, Buenos Aires, Salzburg, Hamburg and London. Her recordings include Musetta in La bohème, with Renata Scotto, Alfredo Kraus, Sherrill Milnes and Paul Plishka, for Angel/EMI, James Levine conducting (1979); La fanciulla del West, with Domingo and Milnes, Zubin Mehta conducting (DGG, 1977); Gustav Mahler's Symphony No.2 ("Resurrection") with Claudio Abbado, Marilyn Horne, and the Chicago Symphony Orchestra (DGG, 1977); and Marietta in Die tote Stadt, with René Kollo, Erich Leinsdorf conducting (RCA, 1975).

She appeared in several performances on television, including a tribute to George London at the Kennedy Center, Washington, D.C. She also appeared as a guest on The Tonight Show Starring Johnny Carson. In 2012, Neblett made her musical theatre debut in a production of Stephen Sondheim's Follies.

Neblett was an artist in residence and voice instructor at Chapman University in Southern California. She was also on the faculty of the International Lyric Academy in Rome directed by Maestro Stefano Vignati.

== Personal life ==
Neblett was married three times. Her first marriage was to the cellist Douglas Davis, her second to the conductor Kenneth Schermerhorn, and her third to the cardiologist Phillip Akre. Her second marriage produced a son, Stefan Schermerhorn, and her third marriage produced two daughters, Adrienne Akre Spear and Marianne Akre. All three marriages ended in divorce.

Neblett died at age 71 on November 23, 2017, in Los Angeles. Survivors include her son, her daughter Adrienne, a sister, a brother, and four grandchildren. Her daughter Marianne Akre predeceased her, in 2001.

== Videography ==
- Mozart: La clemenza di Tito (Troyanos, Tappy; Levine, Ponnelle, 1980)
- Puccini: La fanciulla del West (Domingo, Carroli; Santi, Piero Faggioni, 1982) [live]
