= The Road Home (novel) =

2007 novel by Rose Tremain

- First edition
- Author: Rose Tremain
- Language: English
- Genre: Fiction
- Set in: London
- Publisher: Chatto & Windus
- Publication date: 2007
- Publication place: England
- Media type: Print
- Pages: 365
- Awards: Orange Broadband Prize
- ISBN: 9780701177935
- OCLC: 78989127

The Road Home is a 2007 novel by Rose Tremain.

== Plot summary ==
The story concerns Lev, a middle-aged immigrant who was recently widowed. He leaves his home, Auror, a village in an unspecified eastern European country, after the sawmill he works at closes down. Soon after, he travels to London to find work so he can make money to send to his mother, his 5-year-old daughter, Maya, and his best friend. He finds his first job at a Muslim kebab-shop, before washing dishes at a five-star restaurant named GK Ashe. Along the way, Lev meets a translator from his home country named Lydia who seeks a new life, a divorced Irish plumber named Christy, a young chef named Sophie, and a rich old woman named Ruby.

== Reception ==
The Road Home was positively received by critics. Lesley McDowell, in a review for The Independent, wrote that Tremain consistently and accurately captured the isolation of Lev and other immigrants. Liesl Schillinger of The New York Times reviewed the book saying, "A less disciplined and agile author might have been tempted to ease Lev’s transition from daydreamer to doer. Or she might have jollied Lev into a toque at London’s River Café and set Rudi up as a chauffeur on Belisha Road. But Rose Tremain is in the business of inventing not so much fantasies as alternate realities. In “The Road Home,” she lets Lev in on her secret: “Don’t think about Auror down there in the darkness. Don’t think about the past. The present is also a work of imagination". The Guardian review said, "Tremain clearly enjoys observing wealthy Londoners, their vapidity, their selfishness, through Lev's eyes - and also more cheerfully enjoys describing the busy workings of a kitchen in a high-end restaurant. She recounts in succulent detail several of the meals Lev produces as he begins to hone his own culinary skills. Strangely, it is not until near the end that we are given the dishes particular to Lev's country (rabbit with juniper berries, seaweed ravioli)".

Tremain won an Orange Broadband Prize for the novel, which broadcaster Kirsty Lang praised for its empathy and humour. The Sydney Morning Herald noted that Tremain was viewed as "a shoo-in" for the award.
