= Restoration (Tremain novel) =

1989 novel by Rose Tremain

- First edition
- Author: Rose Tremain
- Language: English
- Genre: Historical novel
- Publisher: Hamish Hamilton
- Publication date: 1989
- Publication place: United Kingdom
- Media type: Print (Hardback & Paperback)
- ISBN: 0-241-12695-9
- OCLC: 20797207
- Followed by: Merivel: A Man of His Time

Restoration is a novel by Rose Tremain, published in 1989. It was shortlisted for the Booker Prize in 1989 and was the Sunday Express Book of the Year. It was made into a film in 1995.

The novel is set in the reign of Charles II of England (reigned 1660–1685), and depicts a medical student who gains the king's favour by apparently curing a pet dog owned by the king.

Tremain later wrote a sequel called Merivel: A Man of His Time, published in 2012.

== Plot summary ==
The novel tells the story of Robert Merivel, who begins the book as a medical student, studying alongside his serious, practical friend John Pearce. John is a studious, pious counterpart to Merivel's shallow obsession with status, drinking and eating to excess. Pearce condemns the sinfulness of Merivel's lifestyle, but Merivel is unaffected by his comments.

Merivel's father asks him to visit the King with the aim of continuing their family's connection with the royal family, but Merivel embarrasses them both with his nervousness. However, later, King Charles II asks Merivel to care for one of his dogs, which is grievously ill. Merivel's decision not to apply any traditional cures leads to the dog recovering naturally, and he is then appointed surgeon to all of the king's dogs. The King then arranges a marriage of convenience between Merivel and one of his mistresses, Celia Clemence. This is to fool the king's other mistress Barbara Castlemaine. Merivel is given an estate named Bidnold in Norfolk, and Celia is installed in a house in Kew, where the King can visit her secretly.

In Norfolk, Merivel abandons the practice of medicine and lives a luxurious life in which he tries to take up painting with the help of an ambitious painter named Elias Finn, and indulges in failed attempts to learn the oboe. Celia is then sent to Bidnold by the King after displeasing him. One night Merivel drunkenly makes advances towards her and is promptly reported to the King by Elias Finn. The result is that Merivel is evicted from Bidnold and left close to destitute.

Merivel joins his old student friend John Pearce at the New Bedlam hospital, also in Norfolk. This is a hospital for the mentally ill, run by Quakers. Merivel joins the hospital with good intentions and hopes to rediscover his medical vocation. However, he develops a romantic connection with a mentally ill patient named Katherine, whom he eventually sleeps with, and impregnates. In addition, John Pearce becomes ill, which Merivel is unable to treat. Despite Merivel's best efforts, Pearce slowly sickens and dies. After Pearce's death, Merivel is asked to leave New Bedlam and take Katherine with him. The Quakers believe their love will cure her illness and this is only possible outside in the world.

Merivel and Katherine travel to London to live with Katherine's mother in London, which is enduring the Great Plague. During this time, Merivel regains some of his fortune by selling John Pearce's recipe for a plague restorative, and he reunites with Elias Finn, who has fallen from the King's favor. Unfortunately, Katherine dies in childbirth but Merivel's surgical skills saves their baby, whom he names Margaret.

During the Great Fire of London in 1666, Merivel rescues an elderly woman from a burning house, which stirs memories of his own mother dying in similar circumstances when others were unable to help her. He gives his card to someone who asks for his name to pray for him. The card is eventually passed to the King, who is impressed by Merivel's change from debauched fool to selfless individual. It is revealed that the King has purchased Bidnold for his own leisure purposes, but he grants that Merivel and his daughter may live there for as long as he lives.

The title of the novel refers both to the Restoration period during which it occurs and to the novel's ending when Merivel returns to Bidnold and the King's favour.
