= Thirty Girls =

2014 novel by Susan Minot

- First edition (US)
- Author: Susan Minot
- Language: English
- Publisher: Knopf (US); Fourth Estate (UK)
- Publication place: United States

Thirty Girls is a 2014 novel by American writer Susan Minot. The novel alternates between the perspective of a girl kidnapped by the forces of Joseph Kony and an American woman reporting on the kidnapping.

== Composition and writing ==
Minot began writing the book in 2005, and she completed it in 2013. The novel alternates between the perspectives of Jane, an American writer in writing about women kidnapped by the Lord's Resistance Army, led by Joseph Kony and that of Esther Akello, a former kidnapping victim. Minot had previously written about victims of kidnapping in a McSweeney's article titled "This We Came to Know Afterward". She drew from her reporting while writing Thirty Girls.

Minot was impacted by the serious subject matter while writing, which she dealt with by writing short stories and compiling notes for other novels.

== Reception ==
=== Critical reception ===
In its review of the novel, Kirkus Reviews praised the novel's prose, but criticized the plot, writing: "[...] there is a secondhand feel to Esther’s story, which plays fiddle to Jane’s navel-gazing."

=== Honors ===
The novel was included on the list published by The Economist of the best books of 2014.
