= Manuel Vilas =

Spanish writer

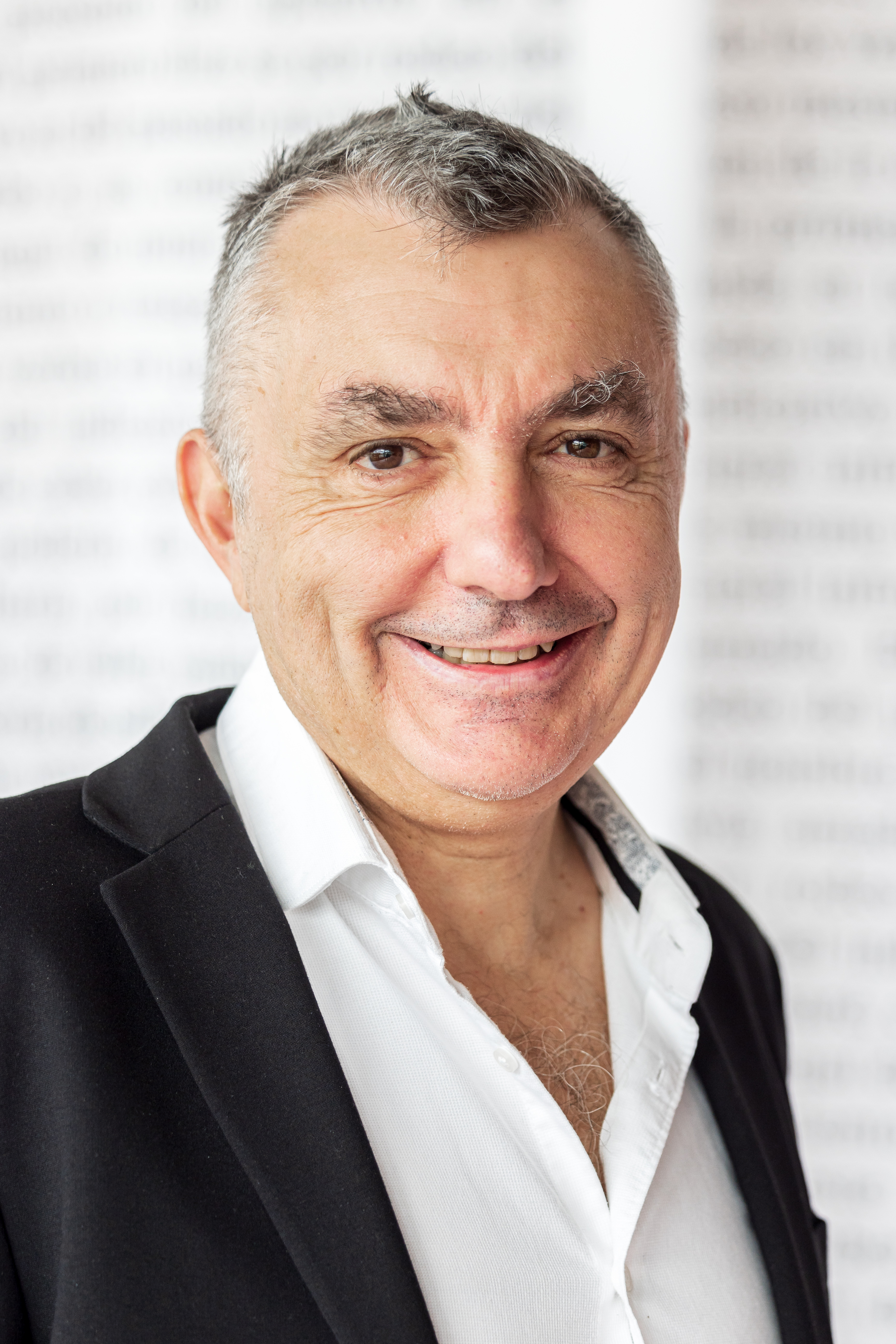
Manuel Vilas at the Frankfurt Book Fair 2022

Manuel Vilas (born 1962) is a Spanish writer. He has achieved distinction in several genres, including poetry, essays, short stories and novels. His novel Alegría was a finalist for the Premio Planeta while an earlier book Ordesa won the Prix Femina Étranger.

He teaches at the University of Iowa.

== Bibliography ==
=== Novels ===
- Vilas, Manuel (2018). Ordesa (in Spanish). Barcelona: Alfaguara.
- — (2019). Alegria (in Spanish). Barcelona: Planeta.
- — (2020). Ordesa. Translated from the Spanish by Andrea Rosenberg (First American ed.). New York: Riverhead Books. (Note: Briefly reviewed in the January 4&11, 2021 issue of The New Yorker, p.75.)

———————

Bibliography notes
