= Stuart Rojstaczer =

American writer, musician and geophysicist

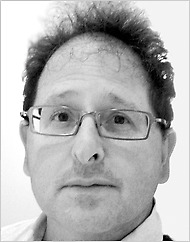
- Born: Milwaukee, Wisconsin, US
- Education: 65th St. School, Nicolet H.S., U Wisconsin, U Illinois, Stanford U
- Occupations: Writer, musician, geophysicist
- Website: www.stuartr.com

Stuart Rojstaczer is an American writer, musician, and geophysicist.

He was trained as a geophysicist and was a professor at Duke University before leaving academia to pursue research into grade inflation and to write fiction and music. He performs music under the stage name Stuart Rosh with his band "the Geniuses".

Rojstaczer was born in Milwaukee, Wisconsin, to Polish-Jewish parents. He was educated in public and Orthodox Hasidic schools and later went on to receive degrees from the University of Wisconsin–Madison, University of Illinois, and Stanford University. He ascended to a professorship at Duke University, where he researched hydrology, ecology, geophysics, and geology. His work has been published in journals such as Science and Nature.

As he departed from academia, he published Gone for Good (Oxford University Press), in which he describes his point of view on the reality of elite academic institutions. He also began to write about grade inflation, maintaining a web site, gradeinflation.com, on the topic of college grading. He published articles on grading in the Teachers College Record and has appeared on NPR to discuss this topic. His writings have also appeared in The New York Times, The Washington Post, and other periodicals.

In the 2000s, he began to write and perform music professionally and to write literary fiction. He has been a Karma Foundation Annual Short Story Finalist and a National Science Foundation Young Investigator.

His novel, The Mathematician's Shiva, was published by Penguin Books in 2014.

In 2015, Rojstaczer won the 2014 National Jewish Book Award for Outstanding Debut Fiction for "The Mathematician's Shiva". The novel was shortlisted for the Ribalow Prize.
