= Leona Walton Neblett =

American violinist (1896-1965)

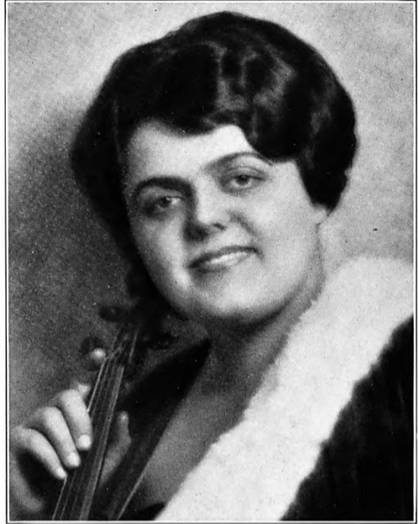
- Neblett, from a 1925 publication
- Born: Leona Walton; March 29, 1896; Silver City, New Mexico, U.S.
- Died: April 13, 1965 (aged 69); Redondo Beach, California, U.S.
- Occupations: Violinist, music teacher
- Father: William B. Walton
- Relatives: Eda Lou Walton (sister); Carol Neblett (granddaughter)

Leona Walton Neblett (March 29, 1896 – April 13, 1965) was an American violinist and music teacher based in Los Angeles, active as a performer in the 1920s and 1930s.

== Early life and education ==
Walton was born in Silver City, New Mexico, the daughter of William B. Walton and Leoline Ashenfelter Walton. Her father was a lawyer and a state legislator. Her sister Eda Lou Walton was a poet and college professor. Walton graduated from Westlake School for Girls, and attended the University of California, Berkeley and the New Mexico State Teachers' College, with further studies under musicians George Enescu, Louis Persinger, Mishel Piastro, and Sam Franko.

== Career ==
Neblett headed the Leona Neblett Trio in Los Angeles. She played violin for radio broadcasts, club meetings, private parties, schools, and concert halls, especially in the 1920s and 1930s, but continuing into the 1950s. She gave a recital at the Guild Theatre in New York City in 1928. In 1929 she played a violin concerto by Henryk Wieniawski with the Los Angeles Philharmonic, on her Gennaro Gagliano violin made in 1745.

She was head of her own violin school with branches in Los Angeles and in Hermosa Beach, and taught at her alma mater, Westlake School for Girls. She was on the board of the Los Angeles County Music Teachers' Association.

== Personal life ==
Walton married attorney William H. Neblett. They had a son, and divorced in 1928, but continued in legal conflict over child custody and support as late as 1936. She died in 1965, at the age of 69, at her home in Redondo Beach. Opera vocalist Carol Neblett was one of her grandchildren.
