= Molly Antopol =

American fiction and nonfiction writer

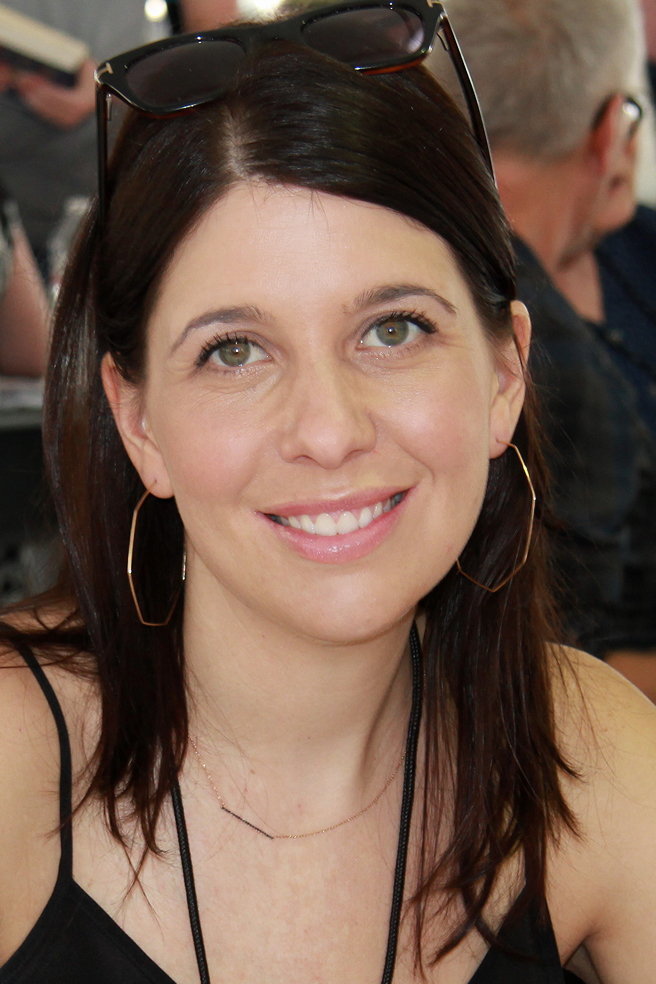
- Molly Antopol at the 2014 Texas Book Festival.
- Born: February 26, 1978 (age 48); Culver City, California, U.S.
- Occupations: Author, professor
- Writing career
- Genres: Fiction, Nonfiction
- Notable work: The UnAmericans (2014)

Molly Antopol (born February 26, 1978) is an American professor and author, writing both fiction and nonfiction. As of 2023, she is an Assistant Professor of English and Creative Writing at Stanford University. Her primary research interests include the Cold War and the Middle East.

== Biography ==
Antopol was born in Culver City, California, to a family with an Eastern European Jewish history.

Her debut story collection, The UnAmericans, was published in 2014 by W. W. Norton & Company. It was nominated for the National Book Award, and won the 2015 New York Public Library Young Lions Fiction Award. Antopol's other awards include "5 Under 35" award from the National Book Foundation; the French-American Prize; the California Book Award Silver Medal; and the Ribalow Prize.

The New York Times compared Antopol's work favorably to Grace Paley and Allegra Goodman. On NPR, author Meg Wolitzer commented that Antopol's work will "make you nostalgic, not just for earlier times, but for another era in short fiction. A time when writers such as Bernard Malamud, and Issac Bashevis Singer and Grace Paley roamed the earth."

== Awards and honors ==
In 2013, the National Book Foundation included Antopol on their "5 Under 35" author list. She has since received notable fellowships, including the Radcliffe Institute Fellowship at Harvard University in 2016, and won the Berlin Prize from the American Academy in Berlin in 2017. In 2019, she was a visiting fellow at the American Library in Paris.

Awards for Antopol's writing
Year	Title	Award	Result	Ref.
2014	The Un-Americans	Edward Lewis Wallant Award for Jewish Fiction	Finalist	
2014	The Un-Americans	Sami Rohr Prize for Jewish Literature	Finalist	
2014	The Un-Americans	PEN/Robert W. Bingham Award	Finalist	
2014	The Un-Americans	Barnes & Noble Discover Great New Writers Award	Second	
2014	The Un-Americans	National Jewish Book Award	Finalist	
2014	The Un-Americans	California Book Awards Silver Medal First Fiction winner for The Un-Americans	Silver	
2014	The Un-Americans	National Book Award for Fiction	Longlist	
2015	The Un-Americans	New York Public Library Young Lions Fiction Award	Winner	
2015	The Un-Americans	Ribalow Prize	Winner	
