= Sadler's Birthday =

1976 novel by Rose Tremain

- First edition
- Author: Rose Tremain
- Language: English
- Publisher: Macdonald & Co.
- Publication date: 1976
- Publication place: United Kingdom
- Media type: Print
- Pages: 190

Sadler's Birthday is the debut novel by novelist Rose Tremain, published in 1976.

After six rejections, Tremain was advanced £350 for the novel by publisher Macdonald. Tremain recalled: "Angus Wilson wrote a generous front-cover puff, and the novel was widely noticed and quietly praised ... A refreshing little shower of success was suddenly falling on me".

== Plot ==
Jack Sadler is 76 years old lives alone in a big neglected house in Norfolk, his only companion being a nameless dog. He reminisces about his life and ponders on his mortality. He spent the most of his life in the same house where his mother was a chambermaid. Jack then became a butler for the house's owners: the childless Colonel Basset and Madge. During the war an eleven-year boy called Tom was evacuated from London to live for five years at the house where Jack took him under his wing, where their relationship developed into love. After the war Tom returned to London with his mother, and Jack lost contact with Tom. Colonel and Madge were killed on their way to the Queen's coronation that morning in London; Jack was then left the house and their inheritance...

== Reception ==
Joyce Carol Oates writing in The New York Times praises the novel "a rather special work, a simple novel that dwells lovingly upon the details of simple lives without condescension or bitterness. In fact, one might wish for more emotion, for more anger. There are times when seems that the ideal English novel is an artifact of a certain number of cautious, well‐crafted pages that manage to offend no one, while stressing the oldest and most conservative of virtues‐stability, acceptance, stoicism, a sort of wry self‐deprecatory humour that translates into courage. Nevertheless Sadler's Birthday is well worth reading, and Rose Tremain a highly promising young novelist.

Kirkus Reviews writes "Through flashbacks, which flicker off and on in random chronological order within his wavering consciousness, Jack's career is reconstructed...Prepare for a jolt when you stumble upstairs with Jack, in this most mellow of diversions discreetly laced with bitters"
