= The Gustav Sonata =

2016 novel by Rose Tremain

- First edition
- Author: Rose Tremain
- Language: English
- Publisher: Chatto & Windus
- Publication date: May 19, 2016
- Publication place: United Kingdom
- Media type: Print
- Pages: 241
- ISBN: 978-1-7847-40030

The Gustav Sonata is a novel by English author Rose Tremain published in 2016 by Chatto & Windus.

It won the National Jewish Book Award in 2016 and the Ribalow Prize in 2017 and it was also shortlisted for the Costa Book Awards and the Walter Scott Prize in 2016 and longlisted for the Baileys Women’s Prize for Fiction in 2017.

It was loosely based on Paul Grüninger, Police Chief of the Canton of St Gallen in 1937.

== Plot ==
The novel is split into three parts:

=== Part One: (1947–1952) ===
Set in post-war Switzerland where Gustav Perle and his best friend Anton Zwiebel live in a fictional small town called Matzlingen. Gustav's father died mysteriously during the war, Anton is Jewish and plays the piano, but he comes last in a competition in Bern where his family and Gustav are in the audience. Gustav then joins the Zwiebels on a holiday to Davos where the boys play in an abandoned TB hospital...

=== Part Two: (1937–1942) ===
Before the war, Gustav's mother Emilia attends the local Schwingfest wrestling festival where she falls for Erich Perle, the Assistant Police Chief in Matzlingen. She gets pregnant and they marry, but the pressure of the Jews migrating across the Austrian–Swiss border make her husband's job difficult, and he pushes her and they lose the baby. Erich arranges a holiday to Davos, to rebuild their relationship. Erich then starts falsifying entry dates to allow Jews to enter Switzerland, he therefore loses his job and his apartment as a result and, Emilie moves to live with her mother. Erich has an affair with Lottie, the wife of the Police Chief. Then Emilie returns and they have a child, Gustav. Erich then suddenly dies of a heart attack on the way to meet Lottie.

=== Part Three: (1992–2002) ===
Gustav now runs a hotel in Matzlingen, and resolves to find out about his father and he contacts Lottie who tells him about her lover Erich. As the hotel requires refurbishment, he takes a trip to Paris accompanied by Lottie. Meanwhile Anton is now a Music Director at an academy, where his playing of Beethoven sonatas brings him the attention of music impresario Hans Hirsch who takes Anton to Geneva to record them. Anton and Hans become lovers but Anton then has a breakdown. Gustav and Anton then move to a large isolated chalet in the hills near Davos. Gustav and Anton share a bedroom (and a bed), while Adriana has her own en-suite room. On the last day of the novel, Gustav wakes up to find Anton playing an as yet incomplete composition of his own called "The Gustav Sonata".

== Reception ==
- Kate Kellaway writing in The Guardian praises the novel: 'Tremain is penetrating in describing the way in which one person’s happiness is sometimes another’s discomfiture – jealousy love’s neighbour. It is a bleak novel and inspires pity for its characters – that most uncomfortable but nonetheless interesting emotion. But Tremain is anything but an indulgent writer and is, here, writing at the height of her inimitable powers. Without giving away the ending, she has the most merciful, believable and uplifting surprise in store. And what ultimately matters here – the heart of this remarkable and moving novel – is Anton’s imperative. He tells Gustav: “We have to become the people we always should have been.”'
- Eric Stinton is also positive, writing in the Harvard Review: 'For all of her mastery of conducting personal narratives against a historically turbulent background, Tremain is at her best when capturing the quaint charm of small-town life and the fuzzy innocence of childhood. Her writing is tender and nostalgic, easy to sink into and too sad and too hopeful to want to keep at a distance...Tremain is a true maestro, an expert guide into historical and human depths. While the novel is saturated with unresolved emotions and unspoken tensions, it arrives at a beautiful, wholly satisfying conclusion. If there is anything left unsaid about the concept of neutrality—whether its virtuous or villainous echoes—the book itself is a reminder that it is an abstraction. It is impossible to read it and feel nothing.
- Likewise John Boyne in The Irish Times is effusive: 'The Gustav Sonata might, however, be her finest novel yet. Yes, it's unremittingly sad and leaves the reader wanting to reach for a bottle of whiskey and a shotgun but I would challenge anyone to come away from it unchanged for here is a novel with a deeply felt storyline, a central character who is both a cypher and a gallant, and it is written with such elegant prose that there is scarcely a sentence that does not inspire admiration...desolation and grief hang over every page and every character, as it must be with any novel that takes the events of the war, and particularly the plight of the Jews during the Nazi era, as its central conceit. Regret, shame, betrayal, disloyalty and madness all play their part to torment the victims and if it feels towards the end that Tremain might be about to overplay her hand with an attempted suicide she displays her great skill as a writer with an unexpected and yet entirely credible closing chapter, not to mention a final paragraph of dialogue that is so uplifting and, indeed, romantic that it brought tears to this reader’s eyes.'
