= The Colour (novel) =

2003 novel by Rose Tremain

- First edition
- Author: Rose Tremain
- Language: English
- Publisher: Chatto & Windus)
- Publication date: 2003
- Media type: Print
- ISBN: 978-0-09-942515-1

The Colour is a 2003 novel by Rose Tremain, which was nominated for the Orange Broadband Prize for Fiction. It is set in New Zealand.

The title refers to the gold prospectors' term for very fine particles of gold.

== Plot summary ==
Joseph and Harriet Blackstone, and Joseph's mother Lilian, are immigrants from England on the SS Albert into the South Island of New Zealand in 1860s. After settling the two women into accommodation in Christchurch, Joseph travels to the foothills near the Okuku river to build their Cob House. Joseph returns to Christchurch once the house has been built and the three of them set off to start their new lives on their farm.

The harsh first winter brings with it problems which threaten the viability of their farm, but Joseph's chance finding of gold in the nearby creek changes the situation. Not telling Harriet about the find, Joseph abandons the farm and travels by boat to Hokitika on the West Coast of the South Island where major gold strikes have occurred.

After Lilian's death, Harriet also travels to Hokitika and delivers that news to Joseph. The search for gold, the 'colour', goes on in difficult conditions. Joseph's encounters with Will Sefton, a young man whom he met on the boat bringing them to the West Coast, and Pao Yi, a Chinese gardener befriended by Harriet, add flavour to the dynamics of the searching couple's relationship which has become distant and strained. Joseph's guilt surrounding events in England prior to their emigration impact on this separation.
