= Monkeys (novel) =

1986 novel by Susan Minot

- First edition
- Author: Susan Minot
- Language: English
- Publication date: 1986
- Publication place: United States
- ISBN: 978-0375708367

Monkeys is the 1986 debut novel of American writer Susan Minot.

== Writing and development ==
The novel draws from Minot's real-life experiences. The novel takes the form of nine interconnected stories, a structure inspired by the works of J.D. Salinger.

== Reception ==
=== Critical reception ===
The Kirkus Reviews review of the novel praised it, writing: "You can hear the voices of the masters--the descriptive economy of Hemingway, the imaged delicacy of Virginia Woolf, and, above all, the informing echo of J.D. Salinger [...]".

=== Honors ===
The novel won the 1987 Prix Femina étranger.
