= Prix Femina étranger =

French literary award

The Prix Femina étranger is a French literary award established in 1985. It is awarded annually to a foreign-language literary work translated into French.

== List of laureates ==
Year		Winner	Original title	French title	Translator	Publisher	Country	Ref.
1985		J. M. Coetzee	Life & Times of Michael K	Michael K, sa vie, son temps	Sophie Mayoux	Éditions du Seuil	South Africa	
1986		Torgny Lindgren	Bat Seba	Bethsabée	Marc de Gouvenain and Lena Grumbach	Actes Sud	Sweden	
1987		Susan Minot	Monkeys	Mouflets	Alain Delahaye	Éditions Gallimard	United States	
1988		Amos Oz	קופסה שחורה (Kufsah shehora)	La Boîte noire	Sylvie Cohen	Calmann-Lévy	Israel	
1989		Alison Lurie	The Truth About Lorin Jones	La Vérité sur Lorin Jones	Sophie Mayoux	Éditions Rivages	United States	
1990		Vergílio Ferreira	Manhã Submersa	Matin perdu	Parecidio Gonçalves	Éditions de la Différence	Portugal	
1991		David Malouf	The Great World	Ce vaste monde	Robert Pépin	Éditions Albin Michel	Australia	
1992		Julian Barnes	Talking It Over	Love, etc.	Raymond Las Vergnas	Éditions Denoël	United Kingdom	
1993		Ian McEwan	The Child in Time	L'Enfant volé	Josée Strawson	Éditions Gallimard	United Kingdom	
1994		Rose Tremain	Sacred Country	Le Royaume interdit	Jean Bourdier	Éditions de Fallois	United Kingdom	
1995		Jeroen Brouwers	Bezonken rood	Rouge décanté	Patrick Grilli	Éditions Gallimard	Netherlands	
1996		Javier Marías	Mañana en la batalla piensa en mí	Demain dans la bataille pense à moi	Alain Keruzoré	Éditions Rivages	Spain	
1997		Jia Pingwa	废都 (Fei Du)	La Capitale déchue	Geneviève Imbot-Bichet	Éditions Stock	China	
1998		Antonio Muñoz Molina	Plenilunio	Pleine Lune	Philippe Bataillon	Éditions du Seuil	Spain	
1999		Hitonari Tsuji	Hakubutsu (白仏)	Le Bouddha blanc	Corinne Atlan	Mercure de France	Japan	
2000		Jamaica Kincaid	My Brother	Mon frère	Jean-Pierre Carasso and Jacqueline Huet	Éditions de l'Olivier	United States	
2001		Keith Ridgway	The Long Falling	Mauvaise pente	Philippe Gerval	Éditions Phébus	(Republic of Ireland) Ireland	
2002		Erri De Luca	Montedidio	Montedidio	Danièle Valin	Éditions Gallimard	Italy	
2003		Magda Szabó	Az ajtó	La Porte	Chantal Philippe	Éditions Viviane Hamy	Hungary	
2004		Hugo Hamilton	The Speckled People	Sang impur	Katia Holmes	Éditions Phébus	(Republic of Ireland) Ireland	
2005		Joyce Carol Oates	The Falls	Les Chutes	Claude Seban	Éditions Philippe Rey	United States	
2006		Nuala O'Faolain	The Story of Chicago May	L'Histoire de Chicago May	Vitalie Lemerre	Éditions Sabine Wespieser	(Republic of Ireland) Ireland	
2007		Edward St Aubyn	Mother's Milk	Le Goût de la mère	Anne Damour	Éditions Christian Bourgois	United Kingdom	
2008		Sandro Veronesi	Caos calmo	Chaos calme	Dominique Vittoz	Éditions Grasset	Italy	
2009		Matthias Zschokke	Maurice mit Huhn	Maurice à la poule	Patricia Zurcher	Éditions Zoé	Switzerland	
2010		Sofi Oksanen	Puhdistus	Purge	Sébastien Cagnoli	Éditions Stock	Finland	
2011		Francisco Goldman	Say Her Name	Dire son nom	Guillemette de Saint-Aubin	Éditions Christian Bourgois	United States	
2012		Julie Otsuka	The Buddha in the Attic	Certaines n'avaient jamais vu la mer	Carine Chichereau	Éditions Phébus	United States	
2013		Richard Ford	Canada	Canada	Josée Kamoun	Éditions de l'Olivier	United States	
2014		Zeruya Shalev	שארית החיים (She'erit ha-ḥayim)	Ce qui reste de nos vies	Laurence Sendrowicz	Éditions Gallimard	Israel	
2015		Kerry Hudson	Thirst	La couleur de l'eau	Florence Lévy-Paoloni	Éditions Philippe Rey	United Kingdom	
2016		Rabih Alameddine	An Unnecessary Woman	Les Vies de papier	Nicolas Richard	Éditions Les Escales	United States	
2017		John Edgar Wideman	Writing to Save a Life	Écrire pour sauver une vie	Catherine Richard-Mas	Éditions Gallimard	United States	
2018		Alice McDermott	The Ninth Hour	La Neuvième Heure	Cécile Arnaud	Éditions de la Table ronde	United States	
2019		Manuel Vilas	Ordesa	Ordesa	Isabelle Gugnon	Éditions du Sous-sol	Spain	
2020		Deborah Levy	Things I Don't Want to Know	Ce que je ne veux pas savoir	Céline Leroy	Éditions du Sous-sol	United Kingdom	
2020		Deborah Levy	The Cost of Living	Le Coût de la vie	Céline Leroy	Éditions du Sous-sol	United Kingdom	
2021		Ahmet Altan	Hayat Hanım	Madame Hayat	Julien Lapeyre de Cabanes	Actes Sud	Turkey	
2022		Rachel Cusk	Second Place	La Dépendance	Blandine Longre	Éditions Gallimard	England	
2023		Louise Erdrich	The Sentence	La Sentence	Sarah Gurcel	Éditions Albin Michel	United States	
2024		Alia Trabucco Zerán	Limpia	Propre	Anne Plantagenet	Éditions Robert Laffont	Chile	
2025	nothumb	John Boyne	The Elements	Les Éléments	Sophie Aslanides	Éditions JC Lattès	(Republic of Ireland) Ireland	

== See also ==
- Prix Femina
- Prix Femina essai
