= Evangelista's Fan and Other Stories =

Collection of short stories by Rose Tremain

- First edition
- Author: Rose Tremain
- Language: English
- Publisher: Sinclair-Stevenson
- Publication date: 1994

Evangelista's Fan and Other Stories is a collection of eleven short stories by English author Rose Tremain. It was published in 1994 in the UK by Sinclair Stevenson. Bloomsbury Good Reading Guide described it as being 'particularly fine'.

== Stories ==
- "Evangelista's Fan" - A 27-year-old Italian clockmaker Salvatore learns that the King of Piedmont has erased the years of his life so he flees to London in 1815. There he falls in love with a woman who has lost the key to a Huygen clock. She does not bring the clock to him and he falls into despair. Eventually he decides to make barometers, inspired by Evangelista Torricelli. He chooses an Italian barometer-maker called E. Fantino and he discovers that owners are English and they say that Fantino was just invented. They ask him to become an apprentice, to cut all his ties and to become Evangelisto Fantino. Salvatore manages to forget about the woman and starts the apprenticeship which takes him two years to perfect his crafts...
- "The Candle Maker" (Trio, Penguin, 1993) - Set in Corsica, Mercedes Dubois had two tragedies in her life. First was her planned marriage to Louis: he went to Paris and found someone else, as Mercedes had planned to kill them. Then 27 years later, the village laundry where she worked was destroyed by a fire. Mercedes started recycling votive candles when she heard from her sister that Louis had returned to the village...
- "Two of Them" (Marie Claire, 1992) - 14-year-old Lewis' father began to 'lose his mind' as he became obsessed with Martians who were going to arrive in his garden. The family moved to Cornwall but his father believed that the Martians would still visit him. His father helped Lewis to prepare a landing area on the beach. But that night Lewis had a secret assignation with two twin girls in a tent. When Lewis arrived home his father hit him as Lewis was not there to meet the Martians.
- "The Crossing of Herald Montjoy" (The Independent, 1993) - Montjoy was the French herald at the Battle of Agincourt. He is sent to Henry V of England to tell them to be ransomed, as the French Army is five times larger. Interleaved with the battle is Montjoys courting of Cecille three years earlier, which results in his failure. Similarly the Battle of Agincourt fails from his point of view.
- "The Unoccupied Room" - Marriane is a doctor specializing in geriatrics, she attended a conference but she somehow suffered a head injury. She tries to make sense of what happened but is confused as she finds herself in a strange hotel room...
- "Ice Dancing" (Telling Stories, Sceptre, 1993) - Set in Maryland a retired successful architect Don and his wife Janet now live in a house designed by him. Then Janet has a fall, and from then she periodically regresses to her childhood. Later she is diagnosed as having hydrocephalus and has an operation from which she recovers.
- "Negative Equity" - Diver Tom, his Danish artist wife Karen and his 12-year-old daughter Rachel are building a Danish house. But due to negative equity they can no longer raise any money to complete the house. Tom then takes a deep dive in an attempt to escape the pressures.
- "Bubble and Star" - Eugene Packard had been a successful Canadian plastics manufacturer, and had been married to Leota for 50 years and they lived near Niagara Falls. Leota had booked them onto small island in Hudson Bay but one morning he went out on a boat, it overturned and his body was not found for a week. Leota was now alone and she recalled Eugene despising those who tried to defy the falls, calling them boobies. Leota decided that she would go over the falls herself, using a plastic bubble built by Eugene's company, then she decided that she did not need a bubble.
- "John-Jin" (BBC Radio 4)- A Chinese baby was left in a woman's toilet in Wetherby, christened John-Jin by the nurses at the hospital. 10-year-old Susan's parents adopted him but he would not grow so he was given growth hormone. Susan loved him but then he was struck down by CJD.
- "Trade Wind Over Nashville" (Pandora's Stories IV, 1990) - Willa, a waitress lived in a trailer park near Nashville with her lover Vee who was a country songwriter. In Green Hiils Lester was a roofer, as he was quoting for a Baptist church. That evening Vee was meeting impresario Herman Berry to showcase his songs. Then a powerful wind struck the neighbourhood, blowing off many roofs. Lester then realised that this would be his opportunity to thrive. Vee did not return that night, Willa's trailer was still standing but badly damaged. That morning she arrived at the cafe and learned that one of Vee's songs was sung by Herman Berry on the Opry and that Vee would not return.
- "Over" (Soho Square III, Bloomsbury, 1990) - In Hampshire a father is struggling to wake up every morning as a nurse rouses him. Every two or three weeks his son arrives which perks him up. He thinks back to when a stoat plays amongst croquet hoops.

== Reception ==
- Michele Roberts writing in The Independent praises the collection: "a sampler displaying sophisticated examples of postmodern writing. The one unchanging element is the cool intelligence animating the stories. They are elegant and fastidious; we sense a writer who cares deeply about craft, taking her time to pick out words one by one and set them in tightly structured arrangements. The unfaltering control of the story-telling is matched by a lack of overt feeling, which is left, I think, to the reader to supply."
- Harpers & Queen writes "Rose Tremain is a writer of immense talent, one who is prepared to take risks, a daring walker on the high wire. In this superb collection of short stories she displays a dazzling versatility, taking us from Regency London to a hospital room in Hampshire to the battlefield of Agincourt in 1415...Rose Tremain's writing has a rare subtlety. And her imagination is extraordinary"
