= Merivel: A Man of His Time =

2012 novel by Rose Tremain

- First edition
- Author: Rose Tremain
- Language: English
- Genre: Historical novel
- Publisher: Chatto & Windus
- Publication place: United Kingdom
- Preceded by: Restoration

Merivel: A Man of His Time is a novel by Rose Tremain, published in 2012. It is set in 17th century England, France and Switzerland and is a sequel to Restoration. It was short listed for the Walter Scott Prize for historical fiction in 2013.
