= Rose Tremain =

English writer (born 1943)

Dame Rose Tremain DBE FRSL
- Born: Rosemary Jane Thomson; 2 August 1943 (age 83); London, England
- Education: Sorbonne; University of East Anglia (BA)
- Occupation: Novelist
- Writing career
- Language: English
- Notable awards: Orange Prize (2008); Whitbread Award (1999); Prix Femina Étranger (1994); James Tait Black Memorial Prize (1992); Sunday Express Book of the Year (1989); Giles Cooper Award (1984)

Dame Rosemary Jane Tremain (née Thomson; born 2 August 1943) is an English novelist, short story writer, and former Chancellor of the University of East Anglia. She has been the recipient of many prizes for her writing, including the Giles Cooper Award (1984), the James Tait Black Memorial Prize (1992), the Whitbread Award (1999) and the Orange Prize (2008).

== Personal life ==
Tremain was born on 2 August 1943 in London to Viola Mabel Thomson and Keith Nicholas Home Thomson. Her paternal great-grandfather is William Thomson, who was Archbishop of York from 1862 to 1890.

She was educated at Francis Holland School, Crofton Grange School, the Sorbonne (1961–1962) and the University of East Anglia (BA, English Literature). She later went on to teach creative writing at the University of East Anglia from 1988 to 1995, and was appointed Chancellor in 2013.

She married Jon Tremain in 1971 and they had one daughter. The marriage lasted about five years. Her second marriage, to theatre director Jonathan Dudley, in 1982, lasted about nine years; and she has been in a relationship with Richard Holmes since 1992, of whom she met on a writer's tour of Adelaide, Australia. She lives in Thorpe St Andrew near Norwich in Norfolk.

In 2019 she was diagnosed with pancreatic cancer, and had a whipple operation performed at Addenbrooke's Hospital in Cambridge. Tremain recovered well, and stated that the diagnosis and subsequent recovery influenced her future works, including her 2021 novel Lily: A tale of revenge.

== Writing ==
Tremain was one of 20 writers featured in Granta's first 'Best of Young British Novelists' list published in 1983, alongside other now-esteemed writers including Kazuo Ishiguro, Ian McEwan, Martin Amis and Salman Rushdie.

Tremain's influences include William Golding and Lord of the Flies as well as Gabriel García Márquez's 1967 novel 100 Years of Solitude and the magical realism style. Her historical novels have been described as approaching her subjects "from unexpected angles, concentrating her attention on unglamorous outsiders".

In 2009, she donated the short story "The Jester of Astapovo" to Oxfam's Ox-Tales project, four collections of UK stories written by 38 authors. Her story was published in the Earth collection.

She was elected a Fellow of the Royal Society of Literature in 1983. Already Commander of the Order of the British Empire (CBE), Tremain was appointed Dame Commander of the Order of the British Empire (DBE) in the 2020 New Year Honours for services to writing.

== Awards and honours ==
- 1984: Dylan Thomas Prize, The Colonel's Daughter
- 1984: Giles Cooper Award, Temporary Shelter
- 1989: Sunday Express Book of the Year, Restoration
- 1989: Booker Prize, shortlist, Restoration
- 1992: James Tait Black Memorial Prize, Sacred Country
- 1994: Prix Femina Étranger, Sacred Country
- 1999: Whitbread Award, Music and Silence
- 2008: Orange Prize, The Road Home
- 2012: Wellcome Book Prize, shortlist, Merivel: A Man of His Time
- 2013: Walter Scott Prize, shortlist, Merivel: A Man of His Time
- 2016: National Jewish Book Award, The Gustav Sonata
- 2016: Costa Book Award, shortlist, The Gustav Sonata
- 2017: Baileys Women's Prize for Fiction, longlist, The Gustav Sonata
- 2017: Ribalow Prize, The Gustav Sonata
- 2024: Walter Scott Prize, shortlist, Absolutely and Forever

== Selected publications ==
=== Novels ===
- Sadler's Birthday (1976), ISBN 0-356-08387-X
- Letter to Sister Benedicta (1978), ISBN 0-354-04353-6
- The Cupboard (1981), ISBN 0-354-04769-8
- Journey to the Volcano (1985), ISBN 0-241-11651-1
- The Swimming Pool Season (1985), ISBN 0-241-11496-9
- Restoration (1989), ISBN 0-241-12695-9
- Sacred Country (1992), ISBN 1-85619-118-4
- The Way I Found Her (1997), ISBN 1-85619-409-4
- Music and Silence (1999), ISBN 1-86056-027-X
- The Colour (2003), ISBN 0-7011-7296-7
- The Road Home (2008), ISBN 978-0-09-947846-1
- Trespass (2010 W.W. Norton), ISBN 978-0-099-47845-4
- Merivel: A Man of His Time (2012), ISBN 978-0701185206
- The Gustav Sonata (2016), ISBN 9781784740030
- Islands of Mercy (2020), ISBN 9781784743314
- Lily: A Tale of Revenge (2021), ISBN 9781784744564
- Absolutely & Forever (2023), ISBN 978-1784745202
- The Housekeeper (2026), ISBN 978-0-06-350947-4

=== Short story collections ===
- The Colonel's Daughter and Other Stories (1984), ISBN 978-0-241-11182-6
- The Garden of the Villa Mollini and Other Stories (1987), ISBN 978-0-241-12075-0
- Evangelista's Fan and Other Stories (1994), ISBN 978-1-85619-399-3
- The Darkness of Wallis Simpson and Other Stories (2006), ISBN 978-0-09-926856-7
- The American Lover (2014), ISBN 978-0-7011-8927-3

=== Children's books ===
- Journey to the Volcano (illustrated by Alan Marks, 1985), ISBN 978-0-241-11651-7

=== Memoir ===
- Rosie: Scenes from a Vanished Life (2018), ISBN 978-1-78474-227-0
