= Call It Sleep =

1934 novel by Henry Roth

- First edition
- Author: Henry Roth
- Language: English
- Publisher: Robert O. Ballou
- Publication date: 1934
- Publication place: United States
- Media type: Print (hardback)

Call It Sleep is a 1934 novel by Henry Roth. The book is about a young boy growing up in the Jewish immigrant ghetto of New York's Lower East Side in the early 20th century.

Although it earned acclaim, the book sold poorly and was out of print for close to 30 years. It received a second life when it was reviewed by literary critic Irving Howe on the front page of The New York Times Book Review on October 25, 1964. Its paperback edition, published by Avon, sold over 1 million copies. The novel was included on Time's 2005 list of the 100 best English-language novels written since 1923.

== Synopsis ==
Call It Sleep is the story of a Galician Jewish immigrant family in New York in the early part of the 20th century. Six-year-old David Schearl has a close and loving relationship with his mother Genya but his father Albert is aloof, resentful and angry toward his wife and son. David's development takes place between fear of his father's potential violence and the degradation of life in the streets of the tenement slums. After the family has begun settling into their life in New York, Genya's sister Bertha arrives from Austrian Galicia (today Western Ukraine) to stay with them. Bertha's coarse and uninhibited nature offends Albert and her presence in the home renews and exacerbates the tension in the family.

Listening to conversations between Genya and Bertha, David begins to pick up hints that his mother may have had an affair with a non-Jewish man in Galicia before marrying Albert. David imagines the romantic setting "in the corn fields" where the pair would secretly meet. Bertha leaves the Schearl household when she marries Nathan, a man she met at the dentist's office. She and Nathan open a candy store where they live with Nathan's two daughters, Polly and Esther.

David begins his religious education and is quickly identified by his rabbi teacher, Reb Yidel, as an exceptional student of Hebrew. David becomes fascinated with the story of Isaiah 6 after he hears the rabbi translate the passage for an older student; specifically, the image of an angel holding a hot coal to Isaiah's lips and cleansing his sin.

During the Passover holiday, David encounters some older truant children who force him to accompany them and drop a piece of zinc onto a live trolley-car rail. The electrical power released from this becomes associated in David's mind with the power of God and Isaiah's coal. Albert has taken a job as a milk delivery man. David, accompanying his father one day, sees Albert brutally whip a man who attempts to steal some of the milk bottles, possibly killing him.

David meets and becomes infatuated with an older Catholic boy named Leo. Leo takes advantage of David's friendship and offers him a rosary—which David believes to have special powers of protection—in exchange for the chance to meet David's step-cousins, Polly and Esther. Leo takes Esther into the basement of the candy store and rapes her.

David is thrown into an agitated state. He goes to Reb Yidel and fabricates a story, telling him that Genya is actually his aunt, his true mother is dead and that he is the son of her affair with the non-Jewish man. Polly tells Bertha and Nathan about what Leo did with Esther. As the rabbi goes to the Schearl household to inform Genya and Albert of what David told him, Bertha begs Nathan not to confront Albert about David's role in Leo's actions. Nathan goes anyway, but he fears Albert's wrath as well.

After Reb Yidel relates David's story to Genya and Albert, David arrives at the apartment. Albert begins to reveal what he has suspected about David's birth. He tells Genya that their marriage is a sham, arranged to make one sin cover up the other—her affair, which was kept secret—against his sin, allowing his abusive father to be gored by a bull, widely known in the Galician village they left. Despite Genya's denials, Albert reaffirms his belief in his version of the story. He declares that David is not his son but the product of Genya's affair.

At that moment, Nathan and Bertha arrive. Nathan hesitates at the moment of speaking his mind under Albert's cold fury. but David steps forward to confess to his parents his part in what took place. He gives his father the whip that was used on the would-be milk thief. As Albert reaches the height of his enraged frenzy, he discovers the rosary that David possesses, believing it to be a sign that proves his suspicions. Albert makes as if to kill his son with the whip.

As the others restrain Albert, David flees the apartment and returns to the electrified rail. This time, he touches the third rail with a long milk dipper in an attempt to create light and receives an enormous electric shock. Incapacitated, he is discovered by nearby tavern patrons, revived by an ambulance doctor and returned home by a policeman. When his parents are informed what happened, Albert appears remorseful and compassionate toward his son for the first time. As his mother takes him into her arms, David experiences a feeling such that "he might as well call it sleep".

== Publishing history and reception ==
Upon its publication in 1934, critics hailed Call It Sleep as a modernist masterpiece reminiscent of the work of James Joyce and other modernist writers, as well as a realistic portrayal of immigrant life in New York City. Time described it in a February 1935 review as "the story of three years in the life of a sensitive Jewish slum-child, told with painstaking and pain-giving fidelity to slum dialect, slum neuroses." Despite critical acclaim, the book did not sell well and was out of print for close to 30 years.

In 1960, The American Scholar, the literary quarterly of Phi Beta Kappa society, published a piece titled "The most neglected books of the past 25 years". In it, Jewish literary critics Irving Howe and Leslie Fiedler proclaimed Call It Sleep as both an American and Jewish classic. The book was republished in 1960 and issued in paperback in 1964. Howe's review of the book on the front page of The New York Times Book Review marked the first time a paperback review appeared on the front page.

In 1991, the novel was praised in The New York Review of Books by literary critic, Alfred Kazin: "Call It Sleep is the most profound novel of Jewish life that I have ever read by an American. It is a work of high art, written with the full resources of modernism, which subtly interweaves an account of the worlds of the city gutter and the tenement cellar with a story of the overwhelming love between a mother and son."
