= Ribalow Prize =

Literary prize for English-language Jewish fiction

The Ribalow Prize is a literary prize awarded annually by Hadassah Magazine the best work of fiction in English on a Jewish theme.

The prize, formally the Harold U. Ribalow Prize, was endowed in memory of Harold U. Ribalow, an American writer, editor, and anthologist.

The inaugural prize was given in 1983 to Chaim Grade for the short story collection Rabbis and Wives. The stories, first published in Yiddish, were translated into English and published by Knopf in 1982.

| Year | Author | Title | Publisher | Shortlist |
|---|---|---|---|---|
| 1983 | Chaim Grade | Rabbis and Wives | Knopf | |
| 1984 | Francine Prose | Hungry Hearts | Pantheon Books | |
| 1985 | Max Apple | Free Agents | HarperCollins | |
| 1986 | Lore Segal | Her First American | Knopf | |
| 1987 | Aharon Appelfeld | To the Land of the Cattails | Weidenfeld & Nicolson | |
| 1988 | Anne Roiphe | Lovingkindness | Shambhala Publications | |
| 1989 | Anita Desai | Baumgartner's Bombay | Knopf | |
| 1990 | Lynne Sharon Schwartz | Leaving Brooklyn | Houghton Mifflin | |
| 1991 | Sandra Schor | The Great Letter E | North Point Press | |
| 1991 | Michelle Herman | Missing | Ohio State University Press | |
| 1992 | Louis Begley | Wartime Lies | Knopf | |
| 1993 | Merrill Joan Gerber | The Kingdom of Brooklyn | Longstreet Press | |
| 1994 | Carol de Chellis Hill | Henry James' Midnight Song | W. W. Norton & Company | |
| 1994 | Michael Blumenthal | Weinstock Among the Dying | Zoland Books | |
| 1995 | Magda Bogin | Natalya Gods Messenger | Charles Scribner's Sons | |
| 1996 | Benjamin Taylor | Tales Out of School | Turtle Point Press | |
| 1997 | Robert Cohen | The Here and Now | Charles Scribner's Sons | |
| 1998 | Anne Michaels | Fugitive Pieces | McClelland & Stewart | |
| 1999 | Richard Teleky | The Paris Years of Rosie Kamin | Steerforth Press | |
| 2000 | Todd Gitlin | Sacrifice | Metropolitan Books | |
| 2001 | Myla Goldberg | Bee Season | Bantam Books | |
| 2002 | Elizabeth Rosner | The Speed of Light | Ballantine Books | |
| 2003 | Jonathan Safran Foer | Everything Is Illuminated | Houghton Mifflin | |
| 2003 | Aryeh Lev Stollman | The Illuminated Soul | Riverhead Books | |
| 2004 | Joseph Epstein | Fabulous Small Jews | Houghton Mifflin | |
| 2005 | Jenna Blum | Those Who Save Us | Houghton Mifflin | |
| 2006 | Tamar Yellin | The Genizah at the House of Shepher | Toby Press | |
| 2007 | Dara Horn | The World to Come | W. W. Norton & Company | |
| 2008 | Nathan Englander | The Ministry of Special Cases | Knopf | |
| 2009 | Peter Manseau | Songs for the Butcher's Daughter | Free Press | |
| 2010 | Sara Houghteling | Pictures at an Exhibition | Knopf | |
| 2011 | Howard Jacobson | The Finkler Question | Bloomsbury | |
| 2012 | Edith Pearlman | Binocular Vision: New & Selected Stories | Lookout Books | |
| 2013 | Francesca Segal | The Innocents | Hachette Books | |
| 2014 | Helene Wecker | The Golem and the Jinni | HarperCollins | |
| 2015 | Molly Antopol | The UnAmericans | W. W. Norton & Company | The Mathematician’s Shiva by Stuart Rojstaczer (Penguin/Random House) and The Betrayers by David Bezmozgis (Back Bay Books/Little Brown) |
| 2016 | Jim Shepard | The Book of Aron | Knopf | |
| 2017 | Rose Tremain | The Gustav Sonata | Chatto & Windus | The Beautiful Possible by Amy Gottlieb and As Close to Us as Breathing by Elizabeth Poliner |
| 2018 | Carol Zoref | Barren Island | New Issues Poetry & Prose | |
| 2019 | Michael David Lukas | The Last Watchman of Old Cairo | Random House | |
