= William B. Walton =

American politician

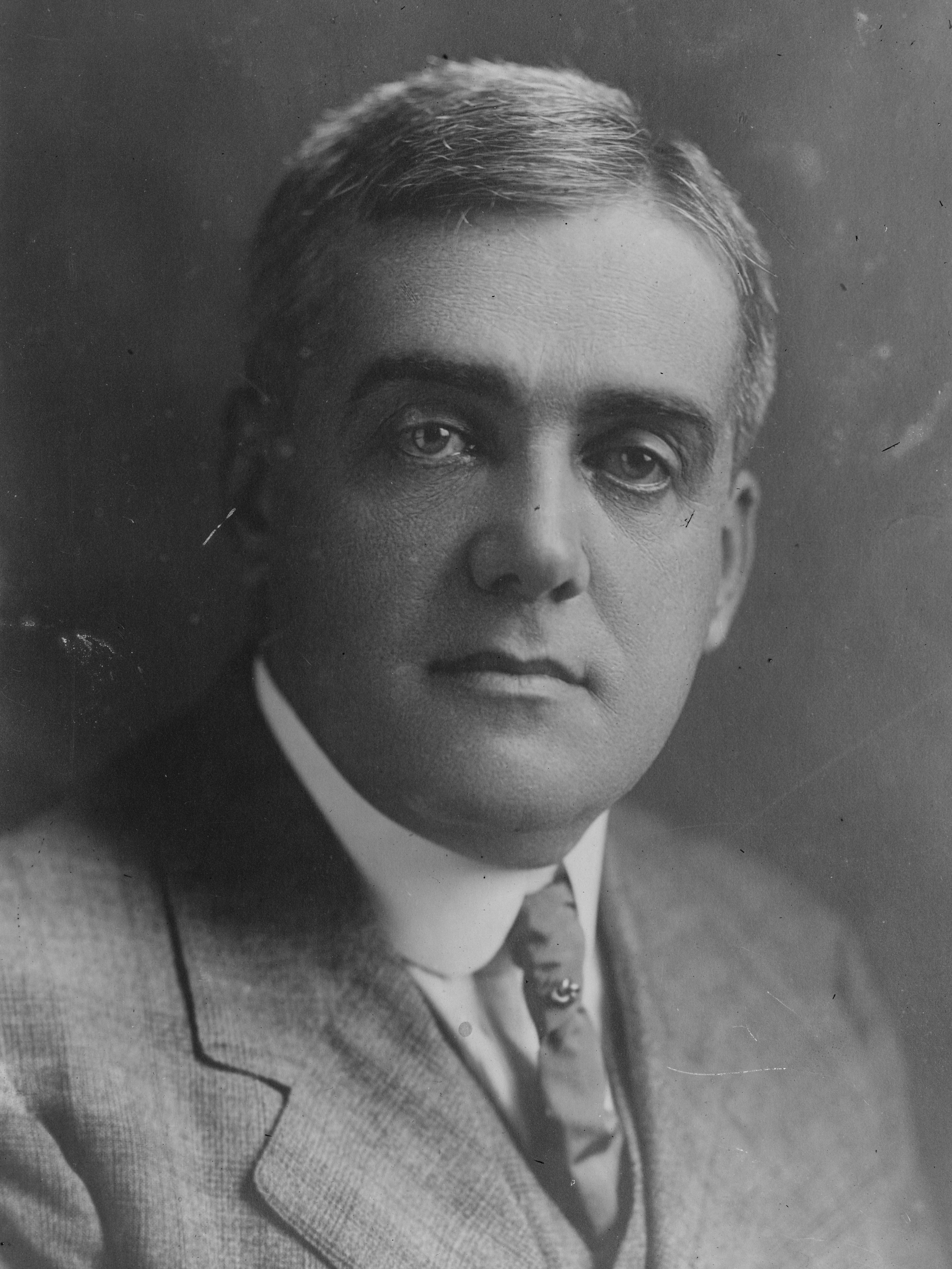

Member of the U.S. House of Representatives from New Mexico's at-large district
- In office March 4, 1917 – March 3, 1919
- Preceded by: Benigno C. Hernández
- Succeeded by: Benigno C. Hernández

Personal details
- Born: January 23, 1871 Altoona, Pennsylvania, US
- Died: April 14, 1939 (aged 68) Silver City, New Mexico, US
- Party: Democratic
- Children: 3, including Eda Lou Walton and Leona Walton Neblett
- Occupation: lawyer, newspaper publisher, politician

William Bell Walton (January 23, 1871 – April 14, 1939) was an American lawyer, politician, and U.S. representative from New Mexico.

== Biography ==
Born in Altoona, Pennsylvania, Walton attended the public schools and the South Jersey Institute, Bridgeton, New Jersey.

In 1891, he moved to Territory of New Mexico, where he studied law, and was admitted to the bar in 1893 and commenced practice in Deming, New Mexico. He was the owner of the newspaper, the Silver City Independent, in nearby Silver City, where he would take up residence. Walton served as a member of the New Mexico Territorial Legislature in 1901 and 1902, then served as County Clerk of Grant County in 1903–1906.

In 1908, Walton was selected as the delegate to the Democratic National Convention, then served as chairman of the New Mexico Democratic Central Committee in 1910.

Next, he went to Washington, D.C., to lobby for statehood for the territory, as a member of the New Mexico Constitutional Convention in 1911.

After New Mexico became a state, Walton served in the New Mexico Senate in 1912–1916.

Walton was elected as a Democrat "At-Large" to the Sixty-fifth Congress (March 4, 1917 – March 3, 1919). He did not seek renomination, but was an unsuccessful candidate for election to the United States Senate in 1918.

He returned to Grant County and resumed practicing law in Silver City, New Mexico. On November 2, 1926, Walton was elected District Attorney of New Mexico's Sixth Judicial District, he was reelected in 1928 and served until 1932. He continued the practice of law until 1934 when he retired from active pursuits. In 1929, Walton hired El Paso Architect Guy L. Fraser to build a 6 unit apartment building on College Avenue in Silver City right across from WNMU. The apartment building was completed in 1931 and is now on the national historic registry as the Walton Apartments.

He had three children, Leona Walton Neblett (a talented concert violinist and violin teacher), Eda Lou Walton Mandel (poet on the faculty of New York University, head of the English Department), and William B. Walton Jr.

He died in Silver City on April 14, 1939, and was interred in the local Masonic Cemetery.

Party political offices
First	Democratic nominee for U.S. Senator from New Mexico (Class 2); 1918	Succeeded by Richard H. Hanna
U.S. House of Representatives
Preceded by Benigno C. Hernández	Member of the U.S. House of Representatives from New Mexico's at-large congressional district 1917–1919	Succeeded by Benigno C. Hernández
