= Susan Minot =

American author and screenwriter

- Born: December 7, 1956 (age 69); Boston, Massachusetts, U.S.
- Education: Columbia University School of the Arts; Brown University
- Relatives: Whip Hubley (brother-in-law)

Susan Minot /ˈmaɪnət/ (born December 7, 1956) is an American novelist, short story writer, poet, playwright, and screenwriter.

== Early life ==
Minot was born in Boston, Massachusetts, and grew up in Manchester-by-the-Sea, Massachusetts. She graduated from Concord Academy in 1974 and then attended Brown University, where she studied writing and painting. In 1983 she graduated from Columbia University School of the Arts with an MFA in creative writing.

== Career ==
Minot's first book, Monkeys, won the 1987 Prix Femina étranger in France and was published in a dozen countries. Her other books, all published internationally, are Lust & Other Stories, Folly, Evening, Rapture, Poems 4 A.M., and Thirty Girls.

In 1984, she received first prize in the Pushcart Prize for her story "Hiding". Among the anthologies that include her fiction are The Best American Short Stories 1984 and 1985 and the Pen/O. Henry Prize Stories 1985, 1989 and 2011.

Minot's poems and stories have been published in The New Yorker, Grand Street, The Paris Review, GQ, Kenyon Review, River City, New England Review, Swink, Mississippi Review, H.O.W., Marie Claire (UK edition), Fiction, Northwest Humanities Review and Atlantic Monthly. Her nonfiction and travel writing have appeared in The Best American Travel Writing 2001 and McSweeney's, The New York Times, The Paris Review, Vogue, Travel and Leisure, Esquire, American Scholar, House & Garden, Condé Nast Traveller, Victoria, and Porter Magazine.

Minot has taught creative writing at New York University, Stony Brook Southampton, and Columbia University.

Minot wrote the screenplay for Stealing Beauty (1996) with Bernardo Bertolucci, and co-authored Evening (based on her novel of the same name) with Michael Cunningham.

Minot's book of poems Poems 4 AM was published in 2002.

The Little Locksmith, a play based on the book by Katharine Butler Hathaway (1942), was performed in North Haven, Maine, in 2002, starring Linda Hunt.

== Themes and criticism ==
Time, death and desire are main themes in Minot's work. Sexuality and relationships, romantic and familial, are explored. Her second book, Lust & Other Stories, focuses on "the relations between men and women in their twenties and thirties having difficulty coming together and difficulty breaking apart". Reviewing her novella Rapture in The Atlantic Monthly, James Marcus wrote, "Sex and the single girl have seldom been absent from Susan Minot's fiction", and Dave Welch at Powells.com identifies one of Minot's themes as "the emotional safeguards within family and romantic relations that hold people apart". Of Lust, Jill Franks wrote that Minot

begins with short, simple sentences, building gradually to longer ones to create the inevitable conclusion: men don't love like women do.

In Folly, a Bostonian woman of privileged background is involved with two different men as she tries to find equilibrium with her society and family in the era between the world wars. Evening is the story of a woman on her deathbed looking back over her life and returning to a wedding weekend 40 years earlier when she fell in love and certain paths in her life were decided. It was nominated for a Los Angeles Times Book Prize for Fiction. Thirty Girls is the story of two women: a Ugandan girl of 15 who has escaped from living two years with armed bandits of the LRA led by Joseph Kony, and an American writer, traveling with free spirits on a journalist trip to Uganda to report on the story of the abducted children.

== Personal life ==
Minot's father, George Richards Minot, was born in 1927 and worked as a banker and stockbroker in Boston. Her mother, born Helen Ruth Hannon in 1929 and known as Carrie Minot, was a mother and homemaker; she was killed on January 16, 1978, when the car she was driving was hit at a train crossing, the signals being down after an ice storm.

Minot married Davis McHenry in 1991. They divorced in 1993. She lived with her second husband, Charles Pingree, from 2000 to 2009. They had a daughter in 2001. Minot lives with her daughter in New York City and on the island of North Haven. She has six siblings: Carrie Minot Bell, an artist; Dinah Minot Hubley, a photographer; Eliza Minot Price, a novelist; George Minot, a novelist; Sam Minot, a painter; and Christopher Minot, an artist.

== Works ==
=== Novels and stories ===
- Monkeys. New York: Dutton, 1986. ISBN 978-0-525-24342-7
- Lust & Other Stories. New York: Houghton Mifflin, 1989. ISBN 978-0-395-48888-1
- Folly. Washington Square Press, 1992. ISBN 978-0-7927-1565-8
- Evening. New York: Knopf, 1998. ISBN 978-0-375-40037-7
- Rapture. New York: Knopf, 2002. ISBN 978-0-375-41327-8
- Thirty Girls. New York: Knopf, 2014. ISBN 978-0-307-26638-5
- Why I Don't Write: And Other Stories. New York: Knopf, 2020. ISBN 978-0-525-65824-5
- Don't Be a Stranger. Knopf. 2024-10-15. ISBN 978-0-593-80244-1.

=== Screenplays ===
- Stealing Beauty. With Bernardo Bertolucci. New York: Grove Press, 1996. ISBN 978-0-8021-3492-9
- Evening. With Michael Cunningham. 2007.

=== Poetry ===
- Poems 4 A.M. New York: Knopf, 2003. ISBN 978-0-375-70955-5

=== Plays ===
- The Little Locksmith
- On Island, an original play, premiered at Islands Theater in North Haven, Maine, August 2, 2018, directed by Lily Thorne.
