= Evening (film) =

- Original poster
- Directed by: Lajos Koltai
- Written by: Susan Minot; Michael Cunningham
- Based on: Evening by Susan Minot
- Produced by: Jeffrey Sharp
- Starring: Claire Danes; Toni Collette; Vanessa Redgrave; Patrick Wilson; Hugh Dancy; Natasha Richardson; Mamie Gummer; Eileen Atkins; Meryl Streep; Glenn Close
- Cinematography: Gyula Pados
- Edited by: Allyson C. Johnson
- Music by: Jan A. P. Kaczmarek
- Distributed by: Focus Features
- Release date: June 29, 2007
- Running time: 117 minutes
- Country: United States
- Language: English
- Box office: $20 million

Evening is a 2007 American drama film directed by Lajos Koltai. The screenplay by Susan Minot and Michael Cunningham is based on the 1998 novel of the same name by Minot.

== Plot ==
The film alternates between the 1950s and the present, in which a dying Ann Grant Lord reflects on her past. Her comments about people she never mentioned before leave her daughters, Constance and Nina, wondering if she is delusional.

As a young woman in her early twenties, cabaret singer Ann arrives at the spacious Newport, Rhode Island, home of her best friend Lila Wittenborn, who is soon to marry Karl Ross. Lila's brother (and Ann's college friend) Buddy introduces her to Harris Arden, a young doctor and the son of a former family servant.

Buddy tells Ann his sister has always adored Harris, and expresses his concern that she is marrying another out of a sense of duty rather than love. Drunk, Buddy passes out, and as Ann and Harris chat they have an instant connection.

On Lila's wedding day, she tells Ann that she confronted Harris with her feelings and he rebuffed her, so she marries Karl as planned. At the reception, Ann sings and is joined on stage by Harris.

Afterwards, the perpetually drunk Buddy confronts them about their growing closeness. Then he unexpectedly kisses Harris. As Lila prepares to depart with her new husband, Ann offers to help her get away, but Lila refuses and leaves for her honeymoon.

Buddy admits to Ann that he and Lila have had a type of crush on Harris since childhood, though he says not in "that way". He then changes the subject, confessing he has loved Ann for years, offering as proof a quick innocuous note she once gave him he has kept in his pocket ever since.

The younger guests dance drunkenly and dive into the sea from a clifftop: Buddy joins in but fails to surface, prompting a panicked search. When he reappears at the top of the cliff, Ann expresses her anger at the prank and berates him for building her up as his true love and possibly for repressing his feelings for others. Storming off, she and Harris slip off to his secret hideaway and make love.

Seeking Ann, Buddy stumbles into the road and is hit by a car. He is found, but too late to save him. The following morning, Ann and Harris, oblivious to what transpired the night before, jokingly consider sailing away, but at the Wittenborns' they hear the news of Buddy.

In the present day, Lila arrives at Ann's bedside to comfort her and reminisce. Ann recalls a day when she ran into Harris in the street in New York City. By then she had one daughter and was on the verge of moving to Los Angeles, and he was married with a son. He declared he still loved her before they exchanged cordial goodbyes.

As Lila leaves, she tells Nina about Harris and reassures her that her mother did not make any mistakes in her life. Nina sits with Ann, who encourages her daughter to have a happy life.

Nina finally musters the courage to tell her boyfriend Luc she is pregnant with their child. Ecstatic, Luc proudly announces the news to Constance and promises he always will be there for Nina. Their joy is interrupted by Ann's nurse, who urges the women to rush to bid Ann farewell.

== Cast ==
The 1950s

- Claire Danes as Ann Grant
- Mamie Gummer as Lila Wittenborn
- Patrick Wilson as Harris Arden
- Hugh Dancy as Buddy Wittenborn
- Glenn Close as Mrs. Wittenborn
- Barry Bostwick as Mr. Wittenborn

The Present

- Vanessa Redgrave as Ann Grant Lord
- Toni Collette as Nina Mars
- Natasha Richardson as Constance Haverford
- Meryl Streep as Lila Wittenborn Ross
- Ebon Moss-Bachrach as Luc
- David Call as Pip
- Eileen Atkins as Mrs. Brown, the night nurse
- Kara F. Doherty as Chloe
- Sarah Clements as Lizzie Tull

== Production ==
Filming began in September 2006.

The original screenplay, as was the novel, was set in Maine, but according to the commentary on the DVD release of the film, director Lajos Koltai was so taken with the Newport house found by his location scouts that he opted to change the setting to Rhode Island. A house in Tiverton was used for interior and exterior scenes. Bristol and Providence, Rhode Island, Greenwich Village, and the Upper West Side of Manhattan also were used for external scenes. Most of the automobiles were provided by the Antique Car Barn LLC from Pawtucket, Rhode Island.

The song "Time After Time" which Ann sings for Lila at the wedding was written in 1947 by Sammy Cahn and Jule Styne. The song "I See the Moon" she later sings to her daughters is based on a traditional nursery rhyme.

== Release ==
The film grossed $12,492,481 in the US and $7,524,272 in foreign markets for a total worldwide box office of $20,016,753.

== Critical reception ==
On Rotten Tomatoes the film has a 28% approval rating, based on 127 reviews. The website's consensus reads, "Beautifully filmed, but decidedly dull, Evening is a collossal [sic] waste of a talented cast." On Metacritic it has a score of 45% based on reviews from 33 critics, indicating "mixed or average" reviews.

Manohla Dargis of The New York Times wrote "Stuffed with actors of variable talent, burdened with false, labored dialogue and distinguished by a florid visual style better suited to fairy tales and greeting cards, this miscalculation underlines what can happen when certain literary works meet the bottom line of the movies. It also proves that not every book deserves its own film."

In the San Francisco Chronicle, Mick LaSalle observed "The film arrives at a pessimistic and almost nihilistic view of life as something not very important - and then invites us to take strength and comfort in the notion. It's not what you'd expect, and it's certainly not the typical message. It might be the most interesting thing about the picture."

Peter Travers of Rolling Stone rated the film itself 2½ out of a possible four stars, but praised the cast, writing, "the actors ... provide flashes of brilliance. Hugh Dancy scores as the plot's catalyst for tragedy. And Claire Danes is stellar as the young Ann ... [Mamie] Gummer proves her talent is her own in a star-is-born performance that signals an exceptional career ahead."

In the St. Petersburg Times, Steve Persall graded the film C and added "Strong performances and an author's weak backbone make Evening a curious mistake ... [it] is memorable only for lovely period designs and for casting mothers and daughters to ensure better continuity."

Justin Chang of Variety wrote "The more immediate problem with this ambitious, elliptical film is Koltai and editor Allyson C. Johnson's difficulty in establishing a narrative rhythm, as the back-and-forth shifts in time that seemed delicately free-associative on the page are rendered with considerably less grace onscreen. In ways reminiscent of Stephen Daldry's film of The Hours, the telling connections between past and present feel calculated rather than authentically illuminating."

In Time, Richard Schickel said the film "represents perhaps the greatest diva round-up in modern movie history ... Wow, you might think, how bad can that be? To which one responds, after two lugubrious hours in their company, really awful. Rarely have so many gifted women labored so tastefully to bring forth such a wee, lockjawed mouse ... This may in part because it was Michael Cunningham, author of the book The Hours, another stupefying exercise in unspoken angst, who was hired to punch up the script Susan Minot was trying to make out of her novel. They share screenplay credit for Evening, but even in the press kit you can sense her loathing for his work. He's sort of Henry James without the cojones and definitely the most constipated sensibility the literary community has lately been in awe of. But I suspect that the director, Lajos Koltai, a Hungarian, has even more to do with the film's inertness."

Lisa Schwarzbaum of Entertainment Weekly rated Evening as the second-worst movie of 2007 (behind I Now Pronounce You Chuck and Larry).

== See also ==
- List of American films of 2007
