= How to Fight Anti-Semitism =

2019 book by Bari Weiss

- First edition cover
- Author: Bari Weiss
- Audio read by: Bari Weiss
- Language: English
- Subject: Antisemitism
- Genre: Non-fiction
- Publisher: Crown
- Publication date: September 10, 2019
- Publication place: United States
- Media type: Print (hardcover)
- Pages: 224
- ISBN: 978-0-593-13605-8
- Dewey Decimal: 305.892/4
- LC Class: DS145 .W46 2019

How to Fight Anti-Semitism is a 2019 book by Jewish-American journalist Bari Weiss that explores the history and current manifestations of antisemitism and attempts to provide strategies to oppose it. She identifies the main strains of antisemitism as left-wing, right-wing, and Islamic antisemitism, and tries to provide a history of each variety. Weiss said that the book discusses the "alarming rise of antisemitism in (the United States) and in Europe" and will propose ways to address the problem. As of January 2022, the book was translated into French and Arabic.

== Content ==
The book opens about Weiss' recollection of the events of the Tree of Life Synagogue shooting, a synagogue that Weiss had attended years earlier for her Bat Mitzvah. Weiss recalls in horror that the shooting hit so close to home for her but uses the story of the shooting to launch into the larger picture of what might be a growing trend of antisemitism in the United States.

Weiss touches on the notion of the different spellings of antisemitism from "anti-semitism" to "antisemitism". Although Weiss does acknowledge Deborah Lipstadt's usage and Lipstadt's sound reasoning for choosing to drop the hyphen (there is no semitism, so how can there be an anti- to something that does not exist), Weiss evidently prefers the hyphenated spelling, though she does not explain why. Among the main arguments of the book is how Israel is uniquely singled out over and over by the United Nations and other critics in ways she considers to be unfair. She writes:

The suffering of the Palestinians ... is a strain on the Jewish soul. Including mine. But it would be obscene to claim that Israel's flaws are indistinguishable from the killing fields of Sudan or the depravity of the North Korean slave state. And yet it is the Jewish state that is singled out for condemnation again and again. According to UN Watch, between 2006 and 2016, the United Nations Human Rights Council condemned Israel on sixty-eight different occasions. The country with the next most was Syria, with twenty. North Korea had nine. China, Saudi Arabia, Pakistan: all zero.

== Reception ==
How to Fight Anti-Semitism won the 2019 National Jewish Book Award of the Jewish Book Council. Hillel Halkin writing in The New York Times opens his review saying that "Bari Weiss has written what must be judged a brave book. That it must be is a badge of shame for the 'progressive' America with which she identifies." Halkin praises Weiss for the "courage for a politically liberal American Jew like Weiss to point out that Jews, though a tiny percentage of the population of the United States, are the victims of over half of its reported hate crimes? That anti-Jewish rhetoric, once confined to right-wing extremists, now infests the American left, too?" Halkin goes on to explain the attacks Weiss received from progressives asking: "Should someone like Weiss, an editor and opinion writer at The New York Times, have to expect brickbats from her colleagues for observing that a vicious demonization of Israel and its supporters has become routine in much of the American left and endemic on college and university campuses?"

Yehudah Mirsky writing in The Guardian says, "Loosely written, going not deep but wide, she brings together trends whose crisscrossing makes for much current confusion. And her observations generally ring true. Her taking aim at both right and left will infuriate some but is on the mark." Tal Lavin of The Nation says that Weiss presents an anti-intellectual argument in her exploration of antisemitism. Lavin says that Weiss presents simplistic caricatures of both the left and the right, and that the presentation of Muslim antisemitism suggests exclusion of Muslim groups from Europe under a veil of plausible deniability. Lavin concludes his review by stating that the "profound lack of intellectual curiosity, proportionality, and material analysis in the book renders it worse than simply useless."

Jordan Weissmann of Slate presents a sharp critique of Weiss's book. Weissmann highlights as his central criticism the false equivalence between antisemitism on the right and on the left. He argues that by reaching towards genocide as the endpoint of left-wing antisemitism, Weiss far overstates her case. Weissman argues that Weiss often fails to present a complete picture of events and people, that Weiss never explores evangelical antisemitism, and that Weiss presents an oversimplified view of how antisemitic radicalization occurs. Linda F. Burghardt of the Jewish Book Council commented: "Weiss's exposition of modern antisemitism deep and layered, and her multifaceted plan for Jews and their allies to fight it is creative and insightful." Burghardt summarizes Weiss's argument as advocating for Jewish authenticity, or positivity, to be proud of Jewish culture, and firm in respect and admiration for Jewish historical legacy. Strengthening Jewish identity will, in turn, strengthen Jewish image in the world. She refers to Weiss's book as "outstanding" in the face of rising antisemitism in the United States.

== See also ==
- Antisemitism in the United States
- The Dhimmi: Jews and Christians Under Islam 1980 book by Eurabia conspiracy theory author Bat Ye'or
- People Love Dead Jews, 2021 book by Dara Horn exploring the exploitation of Jewish history, particularly focusing on the fascination with Jewish deaths rather than respecting the lives and culture of the living Jewish community
- The Final Solution to the Jewish Question, 2026 book by Dara Horn exploring new ways to combat antisemitism
