= Bari Weiss =

American journalist and political commentator (born 1984)

- Born: March 25, 1984 (age 42); Pittsburgh, Pennsylvania, U.S.
- Education: Columbia University (BA)
- Occupations: Journalist; podcaster
- Spouses: Jason Kass (m. 2013; div. 2016); Nellie Bowles (m. 2021)
- Children: 2

Bari Weiss (/ˈbæri ˈwaɪs/; born March 25, 1984) is an American journalist and political commentator who has served since October 2025 as editor-in-chief of CBS News. She was an op-ed and book review editor at The Wall Street Journal from 2013 to 2017 and an op-ed staff editor and writer on culture and politics at The New York Times from 2017 to 2020, resigning in a widely covered public letter criticizing the paper's culture. In 2021, Weiss founded the media company The Free Press (formerly Common Sense) and launched the podcast Honestly.

Several publications have characterized her as conservative, though Weiss has described herself as a "left-leaning centrist" and "radical centrist"; she is also known for her pro-Israel views and criticism of progressive politics. Her tenure at CBS News has been marked by controversy, including layoffs, the spiking of a 60 Minutes segment, and the firing of veteran correspondent Scott Pelley in June 2026.

== Early life and education ==
Weiss was born on March 25, 1984, in Pittsburgh, Pennsylvania, to Lou and Amy Weiss, former owners of Weisshouse, a Pittsburgh company founded in 1943 that sells flooring, furniture, and kitchens; they own flooring company Weisslines. She grew up in the Squirrel Hill neighborhood and graduated from Pittsburgh's Community Day School and Shady Side Academy. The eldest of four sisters, she attended the Tree of Life Synagogue and had her bat mitzvah ceremony there. After high school, Weiss traveled to Israel on a Nativ gap year program, helping build a medical clinic for Bedouins in the Negev desert and studying at a feminist yeshiva and the Hebrew University of Jerusalem.

Weiss attended Columbia University, majoring in history and graduating in 2007. She founded the Columbia Coalition for Sudan in response to the War in Darfur. From 2005 to 2007, Weiss was the founding editor of The Current, a Columbia magazine covering politics, culture, and Jewish affairs. After graduating, she was a Wall Street Journal Bartley Fellow in 2007 and a Dorot Fellow from 2007 to 2008 in Jerusalem.

=== Columbians for Academic Freedom ===
After the 2004 release of The David Project's film Columbia Unbecoming—which alleged classroom intimidation of pro-Israel students by professors critical of Israel and opposed to Zionism in Columbia's Middle East and Asian Languages and Cultures department, allegations the professors denied—Weiss, Aharon Horwitz, Daniella Kahane, and Ariel Beery co-founded Columbians for Academic Freedom (CAF), which led a campaign against those professors. The NYCLU denounced the campaign. Weiss said she had felt intimidated by Professor Joseph Massad during his lectures and believed he devoted excessive time to Zionism and Israel in a course covering the broader Middle East.

A committee convened by Columbia University in response to public pressure after the film's release examined and dismissed most of the allegations made in the film against Massad and the other professors. The committee, which concluded its work in spring 2005, reported that it had "no basis for believing that Professor Massad systematically suppressed dissenting views in his classroom" and that it "found no evidence of any statements made by the faculty that could reasonably be construed as anti-semitic." The committee found it "credible" that Massad had been angered by a question from a student he understood to be defending Israel's conduct toward Palestinians and that his response "exceeded commonly accepted bounds by conveying that her question merited harsh public criticism"; it also described an environment of incivility in which pro-Israel students disrupted lectures on Middle Eastern studies and heckled professors. Weiss criticized the committee's focus on individual grievances, maintaining that students had been intimidated because of their views. In her 2019 book How to Fight Anti-Semitism, Weiss writes that the atmosphere of that period gave her "a front row seat to leftist anti-Semitism" at the university. Journalist Glenn Greenwald alleged that the campaign Weiss helped initiate was "designed to ruin the careers of Arab professors by equating their criticisms of Israel with racism, anti-Semitism, and bullying, and its central demand was that those professors (some of whom lacked tenure) be disciplined for their transgressions". At a panel at the 2012 Conference of the American Zionist Movement, Weiss said she "got involved in journalism through activism", referring to what she called her "Zionist activism" at Columbia.

== Career ==
In 2007, Weiss worked for Haaretz and The Forward. Writing in Haaretz, she criticized the tenure promotion of Barnard College anthropologist Nadia Abu El-Haj over her book Facts on the Ground: Archaeological Practice and Territorial Self-Fashioning in Israeli Society, which Weiss alleged caricatured Israeli archaeologists. From 2011 to 2013, Weiss was senior news and politics editor at the American Jewish conservative magazine Tablet.

=== 2013–2017: The Wall Street Journal ===
Weiss was an op-ed and book review editor at The Wall Street Journal from 2013 until April 2017. She departed after deputy editorial page editor Bret Stephens resigned and subsequently joined him at The New York Times.

=== 2017–2020: The New York Times ===
In 2017, as part of an effort by The New York Times to broaden the ideological range of its opinion staff after the inauguration of President Donald Trump, opinion editor James Bennet hired Weiss as an op-ed staff editor and writer on culture and politics. In her first year at the paper, she wrote opinion pieces defending the blending of cultural influences against criticism from what she termed the "strident left" as cultural appropriation. She criticized the organizers of the 2017 Women's March for their "chilling ideas and associations", singling out several she believed to have made antisemitic or anti-Zionist statements in the past. Her article about the Chicago Dyke March, which characterized intersectionality as a "caste system, in which people are judged according to how much their particular caste has suffered throughout history", was condemned by playwright Eve Ensler and others for misunderstanding intersectional politics.

In January 2018, Babe.net published an anonymous woman's allegation that comedian and actor Aziz Ansari's conduct during a date rose to the level of sexual assault. Weiss published a piece titled "Aziz Ansari Is Guilty. Of Not Being a Mind Reader", one of many responses to the incident in the context of the #MeToo movement. In March 2018, Weiss published the column "We're All Fascists Now", arguing that people on the political left were increasingly intolerant of dissenting views. Shortly after publication, the piece was corrected and an editorial note was added because one example Weiss cited was a fabricated antifa Twitter account that had been identified as a right-wing hoax in multiple outlets in 2017. In May 2018, Weiss published "Meet the Renegades of the Intellectual Dark Web", profiling a group of thinkers she argued shared an unorthodox approach to their fields and to the media landscape. Weiss applied the collective label Intellectual Dark Web, borrowing the term from Thiel Capital managing director Eric Weinstein.

In 2019, The Jerusalem Post named Weiss the seventh-most influential Jew in the world.

On June 7, 2020, Times editorial page editor James Bennet resigned after more than 1,000 staffers signed a letter protesting his publication of an op-ed by U.S. Senator Tom Cotton calling for soldiers to be deployed as backup for police amid protests in American cities. Bennet later said he had not read the op-ed beforehand. Weiss called the internal controversy a "civil war" between what she called young "social justice warriors" and older "free speech advocate" staffers. Other journalists at the Times disputed that characterization; technology reporter Taylor Lorenz called it a "willful misrepresentation" that ignored the many older staffers who had spoken out, while Jamal Jordan, the Times's digital storytelling editor, criticized Weiss for dismissing her Black colleagues' concerns as a "woke civil war".

==== Resignation ====
Weiss announced her departure from The New York Times on July 14, 2020, publishing a resignation letter on her website criticizing the paper for what she characterized as capitulating to social media criticism and failing to defend her against alleged bullying by colleagues. She accused the paper of "unlawful discrimination, hostile work environment, and constructive discharge" and of "caving to the whims of critics on Twitter". The resignation attracted widespread news coverage. In the letter, Weiss wrote that "Twitter is not on the masthead of The New York Times, but Twitter has become its ultimate editor."

The letter was praised by U.S. senators Ted Cruz, Marco Rubio, and Kelly Loeffler; Donald Trump Jr.; political commentator Ben Shapiro; former Democratic presidential candidates Andrew Yang and Marianne Williamson; and political commentator Bill Maher. The letter drew substantial criticism from left-leaning outlets. In The New Republic, Alex Shephard called the resignation a form of "self-cancellation" part of a pattern in Weiss's work of "taking thin, anecdotal evidence and framing it in grandiose, culture-war terms". In The Guardian, Moira Donegan called Weiss a "professional rightwing attention seeker" and disputed her claim that social media's influence had created a hostile media environment for conservatives.

The Financial Times called Weiss a "self-styled free speech martyr". In 2021, Weiss compared her professional situation to that of Galileo Galilei, who faced the threat of execution unless he renounced his scientific views. On October 27, 2020, Weiss appeared on The View to discuss cancel culture, which she called "wrong and deeply un-American". Beginning in 2020, Weiss occasionally contributed articles to the German newspaper Die Welt.

=== 2021–2025: The Free Press ===
In January 2021, Weiss launched a Substack newsletter titled Common Sense. The newsletter was later renamed The Free Press, which became the basis for a media company of the same name.

In 2023, Weiss publicly criticized Palestinian professor and poet Refaat Alareer for a social media post in which he ridiculed a debunked claim that a baby had been burned in an oven during the October 7 attacks. Some of Weiss's online followers subsequently made rape and death threats against him. The Israel Defense Forces later killed Alareer and six members of his family in a targeted airstrike. Before his death, Alareer wrote on Twitter, "If I get killed by Israeli bombs or my family is harmed, I blame Bari Weiss and her likes." When Weiss hosted an event at the University of North Carolina at Chapel Hill in January 2024, student protesters brought posters featuring Alareer's tweet.

=== 2025–present: CBS News ===
In October 2025, Paramount Skydance acquired The Free Press for $150 million and installed Weiss, who had no experience in broadcast journalism, as editor-in-chief of CBS News. She reports to David Ellison, the head of Paramount Skydance. Critics interpreted the appointment as a sign that CBS was shifting rightward in response to the Trump era. Trump praised Weiss's appointment, saying, "The young woman that's leading your whole enterprise is a great—from what I know—I don't know her, but I hear she's a great person." The appointment was shortly followed by layoffs. A former CBS producer alleged these primarily targeted racial minorities while white employees were reassigned. Total reported losses were around 100 employees, including eight on-air hosts, all of them women.

On December 10, 2025, Weiss appointed CBS Mornings co-host Tony Dokoupil as the CBS Evening News anchor, effective January 5, 2026. On the night of Dokoupil's first broadcast, Weiss rewrote his script to cast Donald Trump's Venezuela military operation in a more favorable light. The rewrite caused the text to appear in the teleprompter twice, and Dokoupil stumbled over his words. "First day, big problems here", he said on air.

Later that month, Weiss spiked a 60 Minutes segment titled "Inside CECOT", an investigation by correspondent Sharyn Alfonsi into the Salvadoran Terrorism Confinement Center. At a meeting the next day with 60 Minutes staff, Alfonsi said Weiss had not contacted her before spiking the story, and correspondent Scott Pelley said that Weiss had not attended any of five internal screenings of the segment during the final stages of editing. In CNN Business, journalist Brian Stelter wrote that Weiss had "sparked a crisis". The full episode was inadvertently published online in Canada on a streaming platform owned by Global TV, which held Canadian streaming rights to 60 Minutes, and spread widely online. It eventually aired largely unchanged, with minor additional context, on January 18, 2026.

In May 2026, Weiss replaced Tanya Simon, the executive producer of 60 Minutes, with Nick Bilton, a former New York Times technology columnist with no experience running a television program. Bilton told reporters he had met Weiss socially in Los Angeles and worked with her on two documentaries before being hired by CBS. Correspondents Sharyn Alfonsi and Cecilia Vega were also fired.

In June 2026, Weiss fired Scott Pelley, a veteran journalist and 60 Minutes correspondent. Reports described a confrontational meeting between the two during which Pelley accused Weiss of "murdering 60 Minutes". In a statement after his dismissal, Pelley said that Weiss and CBS leadership had asked him to "inject falsehoods and bias into a politically sensitive story" and to include unverified assertions—instructions he said he refused. In an interview with The New York Times, Pelley was more specific, alleging that Weiss had asked him to alter a story about the Minnesota ICE protests to make protesters appear more violent and to falsely characterize the circumstances of the killing of Renée Good, despite video evidence to the contrary. A CBS News spokesperson said Weiss's requests were "proposed solely to make the piece as strong, fair and accurate as possible".

In September 2026, Weiss directed that a CBS story on Abdul El-Sayed, the Democratic nominee in that year's U.S. Senate election in Michigan, include deleted social media posts related to the September 11 attacks, resulting in accusations of racism and Islamophobia. The incident also caused disarray among some CBS staff, who believe that Weiss made a poor judgment that damaged the network's reputation and credibility.

== Views ==
Weiss has been described as conservative by Haaretz, The Times of Israel, The Daily Dot, Business Insider, and Al Jazeera. The Times of Israel reported that her public dispute with The New York Times made her a figure celebrated by some conservatives.

The Washington Post, The New York Times, and NPR have described her as a critic of the mainstream media with prominent "anti-woke" and pro-Israel views. NPR called her views "somewhat hard to pin down", noting she had previously called herself a "Jewish, center-left-on-most-things-person" and claimed to have voted for Mitt Romney, Hillary Clinton, and Joe Biden. In a 2019 interview with Joe Rogan, Weiss called herself a "left-leaning centrist", and she has also called herself a radical centrist. According to The Washington Post, Weiss "portrays herself as a liberal uncomfortable with the excesses of left-wing culture" and has sought to "position herself as a reasonable liberal concerned that far-left critiques stifled free speech". The New Republic described her as "anti-woke, anti-trans, pro-Israel", and Vanity Fair called her "a provocateur". The Jewish Telegraphic Agency said her work "doesn't lend itself easily to labels".

Weiss has been described as "anti-trans" by commentators citing her editorial decisions on transgender issues at The Free Press. According to The New York Times, when asked to share something that informed her values at a team retreat, Weiss chose a clip from the show Transparent, which features a transgender protagonist, explaining that she never wanted to lose sight of the humanity of those with whom she disagreed.

Weiss has expressed support for Israel and Zionism in her columns. When writer Andrew Sullivan called her an "unhinged Zionist", she responded that she "happily plead[ed] guilty as charged". In 2018, she said she believed the sexual assault allegations against U.S. Supreme Court nominee Brett Kavanaugh but questioned whether they should disqualify him from serving on the Court, given that he was 17 at the time of his alleged assault of Christine Blasey Ford. After criticism in the press, Weiss conceded that her initial remarks were glib and simplistic, and said that Kavanaugh's "rage-filled behavior" before the Senate Judiciary Committee should have disqualified him. After the Tree of Life synagogue massacre in Squirrel Hill, Pittsburgh, Weiss appeared on Real Time with Bill Maher in November 2018. She said of American Jews who supported President Donald Trump:

I hope this week that American Jews have woken up to the price of that bargain: They have traded policies that they like for the values that have sustained the Jewish people—and frankly, this country—forever: Welcoming the stranger; dignity for all human beings; equality under the law; respect for dissent; love of truth.

In January 2022, Weiss was criticized by a physician appearing on CNN after she said on Real Time with Bill Maher that COVID-19 pandemic restrictions had caused mental health harm and that she was "done with COVID".

As of 2024, Weiss had visited Israel more than 15 times, including after the October 7 attacks, and compared pro-Israel social media commentators to former Soviet refusenik Natan Sharansky, whose years of imprisonment made him an icon of the movement to free Jews from the Soviet Union. In 2024, the documentary films October 8 and Tragic Awakening featured remarks by Weiss and others about an increase in antisemitism in the U.S. and worldwide.

== Personal life ==
While attending Columbia University, Weiss had an on-and-off relationship with comedian Kate McKinnon. From 2013 to 2016, Weiss was married to environmental engineer Jason Kass. Since 2018, she has been in a relationship with Nellie Bowles, a former technology reporter for The New York Times. They have since married and have two children. Weiss has said Bowles is their daughter's biological mother.

== Awards and honors ==
Organization	Year	Honor	Result	Ref.
Reason Foundation	2018	Bastiat Prize (Note: Specifically, for writing which "best demonstrates the importance of freedom with originality, wit and eloquence")	Honored	
Jewish Book Council	2019	National Jewish Book Award (Note: Specifically, for Best Contemporary Jewish Life and Practice for How to Fight Anti-Semitism)	Honored	
LA Press Club	2021	Daniel Pearl Award (Note: For Courage and Integrity in Journalism "for her persistent willingness to resist groupthink, her commitment to telling the truth, even when it's politically inconvenient, and her courage in standing up for her people against the rising tide of antisemitism and Zionophobia" (Judea Pearl in the name of the Daniel Pearl Foundation))	Honored	
National Journalism Center	2022	Excellence In Investigative Journalism (Note: Weiss won alongside Matt Taibbi and Michael Shellenberger for their Twitter Files coverage.)	Honored	

== Works ==
- How to Fight Anti-Semitism (2019)
- The New Seven Dirty Words (2020)
