= Alan F. Segal =

American scholar of ancient religions (1945–2011)

Alan Franklin Segal (August 2, 1945 – February 13, 2011) was a scholar of ancient religions, specializing in Judaism's relationship to Christianity. Segal was a distinguished scholar, author, and speaker, self-described as a "believing Jew and twentieth-century humanist." Segal was one of the first modern scholars to write extensively on the influences of Judaism (including Second Temple Rabbinic texts, Merkabah mysticism, and Jewish apocalypticism) on Paul of Tarsus.

Segal was born in Worcester, Massachusetts. He attended Amherst College (B.A., 1967), Brandeis University (M.A., 1969), Hebrew Union College-Jewish Institute of Religion (Bachelor of Hebrew Letters, 1971), and Yale University (M.A., 1971; M.Phil., 1973; and Ph.D., 1975). At the time of his retirement, Segal was Professor Emeritus of Religion and Ingeborg Rennert Professor Emeritus of Judaic Studies at Barnard College and held a concurrent appointment as Adjunct Professor of Scripture at Union Theological Seminary. He had also taught at Princeton University and the University of Toronto.

Segal was an expert in the field of history and religious traditions of Judaism and Christianity of the Roman period, and on the Semitic languages in use in Israel in that period. His scholarly reputation commenced with his landmark book, Two Powers in Heaven: Early Rabbinic Reports About Christianity and Gnosticism (1977), in which he explored early references in rabbinic texts that he proposed were directed against beliefs of Jewish Christians and gnostics. His 1986 book, Rebecca's Children, was a sensitive study showing that rabbinic Judaism and early Christianity were sibling developments from the parent biblical tradition. His award-winning book, Paul the Convert (1990) was Editor's Choice and main selection of the History Book Club's summer 1990 list, and a selection of the Book of the Month Club. The 368 page text is a collection of studies that interprets Paul within the context of Jewish mysticism and history, providing unique depth and insight for Biblical exegetes and Jewish historians. His last book, Life After Death: A History of the Afterlife in Western Religion (2004) was a massive study of beliefs spanning from ancient near-eastern civilizations to the present and across various religious traditions. Life After Death is "considered one of the definitive treatments of that weighty subject – and was weighty in its own right, at 731 pages." It was a selection of the History Book Club, the Book of the Month Club, and the Behavioral Science Book Club. It also featured on the Leonard Lopate Show, Talk of the Nation, and was the cover story of the Globe and Mail Book Review Supplement (Toronto). In addition, he wrote numbers articles and chapters in scholarly books.

Segal gave conference presentations and lectures internationally. He was a founding member of the Society of Biblical Literature program unit on Early Jewish and Christian Mysticism, and the SBL program unit on Divine Mediators in Antiquity. In 1988, he was the first Jewish member of the Society for New Testament Studies to address the society. He was elected a member of the American Society for the Study of Religion and the first American living outside Canada to be elected President of the Canadian Society for Biblical Studies.

Until Segal's book Paul the Convert was published in 1990, most modern Biblical scholars failed to take into account the Jewishness of Paul and the vast majority of Jewish historians ignored Paul altogether because of his perceived antisemitic writing. Segal argues in Paul the Convert that despite Paul's polemical rhetoric, the Jewish community must nevertheless consider the historical value of Paul's epistles because of the insights he provides into first century Hellenistic Judaism.

Segal's exegetical concern is with the Jewish context of Paul's religious struggle following his conversion. He reads Paul's epistles in light of the social sciences, borrowing from modern sociological and psychological studies (especially those pertaining to conversion). He also examines Paul through the lens of Jewish Merkabah mysticism and the Rabbinic tradition – a pioneering method of study of the New Testament. Segal argues that in order to understand Paul thoroughly, one must understand the circumstances of his time and culture. Segal draws similarities between things like Paul's description of his conversion on the road to Damascus (2 Cor. 12:1–9) and Ezekiel and Enoch's heavenly ascent. He argues that Paul's emphasis on the Glory of God (Kavod) in these stories is characteristic of the Merkabah mystic tradition. The type of exegesis that Segal engages in provides a rare insight into first century thinking.

Segal understands Paul as part of Jewish history; he interprets Paul's conversion as an apostasy and a break from Judaism because of his insistence on transformation in Christ, although Paul never perceived his actions as outside the Jewish community (Acts 21:24). Paul, Segal argues, never felt that he had left Judaism, "He began as a Pharisee and became a convert from Pharisaism. He spent the rest of his life trying to express what he converted to. He never gave it a single name." Paul's conversion experience, Segal argues, forced him to re-evaluate his faith and understanding of the Torah; he was made to reconcile his revelation with his Pharisaism.

Segal was a frequent media commentator on St. Paul and other issues to deal with early Christianity and Judaism. Segal, who wrote on Christian and Jewish beliefs in an afterlife, explained to reporters that belief in an existence beyond death persists among Americans no matter how little they observe their religion.

During September 2007, Segal became part of the controversial tenure battle concerning Barnard anthropology professor Nadia Abu El Haj. Segal, who was opposed to Abu El Haj's tenure bid, told The New York Times that "there is every reason in the world to want her to have tenure, and only one reason against it – her work, I believe it is not good enough." Segal wrote a critique of Abu El Haj's book Facts on the Ground for the Columbia Daily Spectator, in which he said that the reasons for which he opposed tenure for Abu El Haj were professional, not personal. Segal later told The Forward that Abu El-Haj hates Israelis.

== Selected bibliography ==
- Deus Ex Machina: Computers in the Humanities
- Jews and Arabs: A Teaching Guide
- Life After Death: A History of the Afterlife in Western Religions, Doubleday, 2004. ISBN 978-0-385-42299-4.
- The Other Judaisms of Late Antiquity Scholars Press, 1987.
- Paul the Convert: The Apostasy and Apostolate of Saul of Tarsus Yale University Press, 1990.
- Rebecca's Children: Judaism and Christianity in the Roman World, Harvard University Press, 1986. ISBN 0-674-75076-4.
- Two Powers in Heaven: Early Rabbinic Reports about Christianity and Gnosticism E.J. Brill, 1977.
- Sinning in the Hebrew Bible: How The Worst Stories Speak for Its Truth. Columbia University Press, 2012.
