= The Final Solution to the Jewish Question =

The Final Solution to the Jewish Question: A Love Story for the Living is a non-fiction book by American essayist and novelist Dara Horn. It was published on September 1, 2026, by Avid Reader press, an imprint of Simon & Schuster. It is a collection of interconnected essays combining personal reflection, historical analysis and observations spanning the representation of Jewish tradition in public discourse throughout history and the question of how education might more effectively address antisemitism.

Although linked by common themes, the essays can also be read individually. Building on concepts introduced in her earlier book, People Love Dead Jews (2021), Horn argues that efforts to combat antisemitism are limited by their over emphasis on Jewish persecution, extermination, and powerlessness.

According to Horn, most American students learn little, if anything at all about Jews, beyond the fact that Jews were killed between 1933 and 1945. She recalls that one docent at a Holocaust museum told her that students often asked him, "Are there still Jews alive today?" Her book calls for education that instead focuses on the history of Jewish life, its resilience and distinct cultural contribution to provide a context in which antisemitism no longer make sense. As such, she argues that "there is no way to debunk the lies of antisemitism without investing in teaching the truth about who the Jews are." She contends that antisemitism is largely driven by ignorance and not malice. The book explores antisemitism in American universities, the history of antizionism, the shortcomings of Holocaust education and the spread of antisemitic material through artificial intelligence. Horn proposes an educational approach that emphasizes Jewish history and the relationship between Jewish tradition, freedom and resistance to tyranny.

The book was listed in the New York Times combined print and e-book best seller chart for nonfiction.

== Background and context ==
Horn received letters from readers of the The World Loves Dead Jews describing their experiences of antisemitism. These ranged from verbal abuse to destruction of property, death threats, and violence. They asked for advice on how to address it. Following the massacre in Israel on October 7, 2023, and the subsequent attacks on Jewish communities worldwide, Horn received calls for help from university presidents and U.S. government officials. While The World Loves Dead Jews describes the phenomenon of antisemitism, it does not recommend solutions. In several interviews Horn joked that her sister had described her as the "antisemitism Lorax." Much like the Dr. Seuss creation who speaks for the trees, while their destruction continues, Horn speaks for Jews while antisemitism continues.

Horn subsequently became involved in discussions about antisemitism in American education and served on Harvard University's Antisemitism Advisory Group, established in the aftermath of the October 7 attacks on Israel, and the campus protests that followed. This prompted her to consider the role of education in addressing antisemitism. Her use of Final Solution in the book title references the Nazi regime's plan to rid the world of Jews. Its subtitle, A Love Story for the Living, contrasts this history of extermination with Horn's proposal for greater emphasis on Jewish life and civilization.

== Synopsis and key themes ==
This second volume of essays argues that antisemitism hinges on the recurring "Big Lie" that Jews are responsible for destroying whatever a society, its government or its institutions value most. Her essays demonstrate how the lie changes throughout history to reflect whatever a particular society values: pious societies have accused Jews of blasphemy; secular societies have accused Jews of "backward" piety; Jews have been accused of capitalism among communists; among capitalists, of communism; and in contemporary anti-racist and anti-colonialist discourse, Jews have been accused of racism and colonialism. Horn argues that presenting antisemitism as a defense of a society's own ideals makes prejudice appear as a righteous cause responding to a perceived threat.

She describes Jews as a tribal group predating contemporary concepts like race and nationality, rather than primarily a religion. She presents Jewish tradition as a 3000-year-old anti-tyrannical, counter-cultural movement: Jews bow to no other gods – neither pharaohs, nor emperors. Nothing infuriates tyrants more than "nonconformity". She demonstrates how "the lie" is leveraged by those seeking to "gain or maintain power".

Horn's essays argue that while teaching antisemitism has generally concentrated on powerless or dead Jews, Jewish life and culture cannot be separated from the history of antisemitism. She calls for the two histories to be taught together. Underpinned by her contention that ignorance rather than malice causes animosity towards Jews, she notes that "When social media bots then inform these students that Jews are European colonizers who have no business in the Middle East, why wouldn't they believe it, when it doesn't contradict anything, they know?" To counter their allegation, Horn describes "the racial, religious, and ethnic diversity of Israelis and places Zionism in the context of the many nationalist movements to emerge in the late 19th and early 20th centuries." She insists that education about antisemitism should reflect the centrality of literacy, civil discourse and responsibility in Jewish history and calls for teaching the full story of Jewish personhood and its distinctive cultural contributions.

The volume traces the roots of anti-Zionism as a political ideology to the Bolsheviks and the Soviet Union, predating Israel's independence by decades: "Zionism is racism. Zionism is colonialism. Zionism is apartheid. Zionism is genocide. These are all slogans that go back to the 1960s and 70s." She recounts examples from the Farhud pogrom of Jews in Iraq to the 2001 Durban conference. Her essays seek to demonstrate how antizionism has been used to discredit Jews, making hostility towards them more politically palatable. She describes "antizionism" as "an ideology unrelated to anything real about Jews," drawing a parallel with antisemitism, hence removing the hyphen. She draws connections between historical examples and contemporary "antizionist" discourse on the political left. She references a range of examples, such as Johann von Leers and the circulation of "antizionist" material. The book regards the campus protests post the October 7 attack on Israel and debates over Israel as examples of the challenges involved in distinguishing legitimate political disagreement from the demonization of Jews and Israel. Horn argues that "antizionist" rhetoric can reproduce historical patterns of antisemitic propaganda, including when expressed in the language of justice

In the essay Cowardice at Harvard she examines Harvard's response to antisemitism and questions why Jewish students were not considered within the university's diversity, equity and inclusion (DEI) framework. Discussing her experience on Harvard's Antisemitism Advisory Group, Horn argues that antisemitic claims are being taught as facts rather than examined critically. She uses the word "saturation" to describe the widespread embedding of an unchallenged narrative across courses, such as an English class about "decolonizing Palestine" and programs in Harvard's Graduate School of Education and School of Public Health. She argues against the practice of replacing intellectual inquiry with ideological conformity.

Marc Katz describes her essay, The Problem with Everyone's Favorite Solution, as one in which Horn "deconstructs" the allegations that Israel is committing genocide against Palestinians, exploring the "hypocrisy" of International Court of Justice, and re-translates statements by Israeli officials that she argues have been taken out of context and re-framed as evidence of genocidal intent.

Horn discusses the circulation of antisemitic propaganda online and its potential consequences for artificial intelligence. She argues that material placed on the internet can train or inform AI systems, risking the reproduction of antisemitic claims in their outputs. She presents this problem as part of a broader concern about the transmission of antisemitic ideas through contemporary information networks. She offers a solution in the form of a nonprofit educational initiative to improve antisemitic pattern recognition, the questioning false assumptions, and the identification of media manipulation. She maintains that developing these critical skills can undermine the conditions in which antisemitic ideas grow.

== Reception ==
=== Praise ===
In a starred review, Booklist described the book as a painstaking exploration of antisemitism and efforts to counter it. The review praised Horn's clarity and understanding, calling it an important book likely to generate discussion, while noting its difficult and sometimes painful nature.

Stuart Halpern's review in the Wall Street Journal examined Horn's argument that traditional educational responses to antisemitism have been inadequate. It discussed her criticism of approaches that seek acceptance by highlighting Jewish victim-hood or demonstrating the contributions of Jewish individuals to American society, rather than addressing the wider understanding of Jewish identity.

Publishers Weekly described the book as a "sharp and provocative analysis of antisemitism" and the shortcomings of efforts to eradicate it. The review praised Horn's historical knowledge and use of humor, describing the book as an account that was both forthright and "surprisingly optimistic". It highlighted her argument that education should address the history and cultural contributions of Jewish people rather than concentrating on persecution or treating Jews as interchangeable with other groups.

Kirkus Reviews described the book as "impassioned, important reading" and praised Horn's efforts to innovate constructive approaches to combating antisemitism. The review noted her emphasis on Jewish civilization and its history of resistance to tyranny, while contending that some of her interpretations of recent events lacked nuance.

=== Criticism ===
Eugene L. Meyer's review in the Washington Independent Review of Books described the book as important but questioned how effectively its proposed solution could overcome the problem of antisemitism. His review discussed Horn's account of the persistence of antisemitic allegations throughout history, their propagation through modern social media, and her proposal to shift the emphasis of Jewish education from victim-hood to resilience and cultural achievement.

Reviewer PJ Grisar, writing for The Forward, offered a critical assessment of the book, describing it as readable but characterizing it as a polemical examination of antisemitism. While acknowledging the value of Horn's historical account of anti-Zionist propaganda, he questioned her application of this history to contemporary political movements and protests concerning Israel.
