= Nadia Abu El Haj =

American anthropologist (born 1962)

Nadia Abu El-Haj
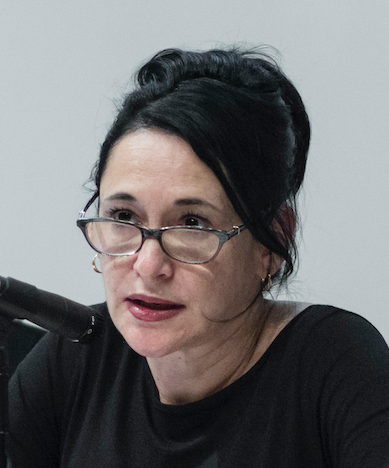
- Born: 1962 (age 63–64); United States
- Occupations: Anthropologist, academic

Academic background
- Education: Bryn Mawr College (AB); Duke University (PhD)

Academic work
- Institutions: Barnard College, Columbia University
- Website: Barnard faculty profile

Nadia Abu El-Haj (Arabic: نادية أبو الحاج; born 1962) is an American anthropologist. She is the Ann Whitney Olin Professor of Anthropology at Barnard College and Columbia University, and co-director of the Center for Palestine Studies at Columbia.

The author of Facts on the Ground: Archaeological Practice and Territorial Self-Fashioning in Israeli Society (2001) and The Genealogical Science: The Search for Jewish Origins and the Politics of Epistemology (2012), and Combat Trauma: Imaginaries of War and Citizenship in Post-9/11 America (2022). Abu El-Haj was the subject of dueling online petitions arguing whether she should be tenured during the 2006–07 academic year when she was recommended for tenure. Abu El-Haj received tenure in November 2007.

== Biography ==
=== Early life and education ===
Abu El-Haj was born in the United States, the second daughter of a "Long Island Episcopalian" mother, and a Palestinian Muslim father. Her maternal grandfather was French and maternal grandmother, Norwegian-American, and she has characterized her religious upbringing as "church twice a year."

Abu El-Haj spent a couple of years in private schools in Tehran, Iran and Beirut, Lebanon, while her father was deployed there for the United Nations. She returned to the United States for her university studies, attending Bryn Mawr College for her Bachelor of Arts degree in Political Science, and going on to receive her doctoral degree from Duke University. Between 1993 and 1995, she did post-doctoral work on a fellowship from Harvard University's Academy for International and Area Studies, focusing on the Middle East. She also received fellowships from the University of Pennsylvania Mellon Program, and the Institute for Advanced Study in Princeton, New Jersey. She speaks English, Arabic, French, Persian, and Hebrew.

=== Academic career ===
Abu El-Haj taught at the University of Chicago from 1997 until 2002, when she joined the faculty at Barnard College. She has also lectured at the New York Academy of Sciences, New York University, the University of Pennsylvania, the Institute of Advanced Study at Princeton, the University of Cambridge, the London School of Economics (LSE), and the School of Oriental and African Studies (SOAS) of the University of London.

A former Fulbright Fellow, she was a recipient of the SSRC-McArthur Grant in International Peace and Security, and grants from the Wenner-Gren Foundation for Anthropological Research and the National Endowment for the Humanities. She is also an Associate Editor of the American Ethnologist: A Journal of the American Ethnological Society and serves on the Editorial Collectives of Public Culture and Social Text. In a 2008 interview with The New Yorker, she said, "I'm not a public intellectual. ... I don't court controversy."

== Research ==
=== Facts on the Ground ===
In 2001, Abu El-Haj published Facts on the Ground: Archaeological Practice and Territorial Self-Fashioning in Israeli Society. In it, she uses anthropological methods to explore the relationship between the development of scientific knowledge and the construction of the social imaginations and political orders, using the discipline of Israeli archaeology as the subject of her study. Arguing that the facts generated by archaeological practice fashion "cultural understandings, political possibilities and 'common-sense' assumptions", she posits that, in the case of Israel, the practice works to serve the "formation and enactment of its colonial-national historical imagination and ... the substantiation of its territorial claims".

Facts on the Ground has been reviewed in both scholarly and popular publications. The book was awarded the Middle East Studies Association of North America 2002 Albert Hourani Book Award which it shared with Gershon Shafir and Yoav Peled's Being Israeli: the Dynamics of Multiple Citizenship. Negative reviews were intense. The book was also dismissed as 'crank scholarship,' and she was called a 'charlatan anthropologist'. An internet domain was registered in her name dedicated exclusively to defaming her and damaging her reputation.

=== Other scholarship ===
Abu El-Haj's more recent scholarship explores the field of genetic anthropology through the analysis of projects aimed at reconstructing the origins and migrations of specific populations. Analysis is also directed toward the role of for-profit corporations offering genetic ancestry testing. How race, diaspora, and kinship intersect, and how genetic origins emerge as a shared concern among those seeking redress or recognition, are predominant themes in the work.

Reviewing El-Haj's 2012 book, The Genealogical Science: The Search for Jewish Origins and the Politics of Epistemology, geneticist Richard Lewontin, writing in The New York Review of Books, described her as a "genetic determinist" not in the "usual sense" but because she writes that "fundamental aspects of who one is are determined by one's past" and that "who we really are collectively and individually is given by and legible in biological data." He proposes that a term such as "biological determinism" might be coined to describe her attitude despite her assertion that although the choice to act or not act on the available information about our ancestry, which she describes as telling us who we "really are" is a matter of free choice.

In 2022, Abu El-Haj published Combat Trauma: Imaginaries of War and Citizenship in Post-9/11 America (Verso). The book examines how understandings of post-traumatic stress disorder changed from the Vietnam War to the post-9/11 period, and argues that public attention to soldiers' trauma has overshadowed the people killed by American military action abroad. In a review for The Washington Post, Lyle Jeremy Rubin praised the book but questioned how its argument would apply to veterans who did not share the author's political views.

== Tenure controversy ==
Abu El-Haj joined the Anthropology Department at Barnard College in the fall of 2002. Because of Barnard College's affiliation with Columbia University, professors recommended for tenure at Barnard are subject to approval by Columbia. Abu El-Haj was recommended for tenure by the faculty at Barnard in the 2006–07 academic year, and by Columbia in the 2007–08 academic year.

=== Dueling petitions ===
On August 7, 2007, an online petition against the professor was started by Paula Stern, a 1982 Barnard alumna who lives in the Israeli settlement of Ma'aleh Adumim. The petition claimed tenure should be denied because of Abu El-Haj's perceived anti-Semitic bias in her research, with criticism centering around her book Facts on the Ground. In response to Stern's petition, in late August a petition supporting Abu El-Haj was initiated by Paul Manning, a linguist in the anthropology department at Trent University in Peterborough, Canada.

By the time Barnard announced that it had granted Abu El-Haj tenure, in November 2007, 2,592 people had signed the anti-tenure petition and 2,057 had signed the pro-tenure petition.

=== Academic debate of Abu El-Haj's credentials ===
In August 2007, The Chronicle of Higher Education reported on support for Abu El-Haj among scholars of anthropology and of Middle East studies. Lisa Wedeen, Chair of the Political Science department at the University of Chicago, said that Facts on the Ground showed that Abu El-Haj was more interested in the philosophy of science than in political argument.

The Chronicle of Higher Education also wrote that many of Abu El-Haj's supporters said that peer review, and not public pressure, is the appropriate measure of a scholar's work, noting that she has been the recipient of many awards, grants, and academic appointments. An article in The New York Times in September 2007 reported that many of Abu El-Haj's supporters, particularly those in the field of anthropology, praised her book as "solid, even brilliant, and part of an innovative trend". For example, Michael Dietler, a professor of anthropology at the University of Chicago, described Abu El-Haj as a top-quality scholar. Dietler also said Abu El-Haj was being opposed because she is of Palestinian descent.

Alan F. Segal, a professor of religion and Jewish studies at Barnard, questioned the quality of her research. Saying that Abu El-Haj had suggested that "ancient Israelites had not inhabited the land where Israel now stands", Segal said that she either ignored or misunderstood the evidence to the contrary. In a critique of Facts on the Ground published in the Columbia Daily Spectator, Segal wrote that he opposed Abu El-Haj for professional, and not political, reasons. Segal later told The Forward that Abu El-Haj hates Israelis.

William G. Dever, retired professor of Near East archaeology at the University of Arizona, told The New York Sun that Abu El-Haj should be denied tenure because her scholarship is "faulty, misleading and dangerous", and not because she is a Palestinian or a leftist.

Segal and Dever spoke at lectures sponsored by Scholars for Peace in the Middle East and LionPAC (a pro-Israel advocacy group at Columbia) aimed at rebutting El-Haj. In his lecture, Dever disputed the notion that archaeology has inherent biases. In responding to the controversy surrounding Abu El-Haj's work, Barnard President Judith Shapiro said that showing how archaeological research can be used for political and ideological purposes is a legitimate cultural anthropological enterprise.

=== Tenure decision ===
On November 2, 2007, Barnard announced that Abu El-Haj had been granted tenure. Subsequent to the tenure decision, Barnard president Shapiro praised Abu El-Haj to an interviewer from the New Yorker.

== Published works ==
- Combat Trauma: Imaginaries of War and Citizenship in post-9/11 America. Verso Books. September 27, 2022. ISBN 978-1-78873-842-2
- The Genealogical Science: The Search for Jewish Origins and the Politics of Epistemology. University of Chicago Press. 2012.
- El-Haj, Nadia Abu (2007). "The Genetic Reinscription of Race". Annual Review of Anthropology. 36: 283–300. doi:10.1146/annurev.anthro.34.081804.120522.
- El-Haj, Nadia Abu (2007). "Rethinking Genetic Genealogy: A Response to Stephan Palmi". American Ethnologist. 34 (2): 223–227. doi:10.1525/ae.2007.34.2.223. JSTOR 4496797.
- Abu El-Haj, Nadia (November 2005). "Edward Said and the Political Present". American Ethnologist. 32 (4): 538–555. doi:10.1525/ae.2005.32.4.538.
- Abu El-Haj, Nadia (Spring 2003). "Reflections on Archaeology and Israeli Settler-Nationhood". Radical History Review. 86 (86): 149–163.
- El-Haj, Nadia Abu (2002). "Producing (Arti)Facts: Archaeology and Power during the British Mandate of Palestine". Israel Studies. 7 (2): 33–61. doi:10.2979/ISR.2002.7.2.33. JSTOR 30245585.
- Facts on the Ground: Archaeological Practice and Territorial Self-Fashioning in Israeli Society. University of Chicago Press. 2001.
- "Translating Truths: Nationalism, Archaeological Practice and the Remaking of Past and Present in Contemporary Jerusalem". American Ethnologist. 25 (2): 166–188. May 1998. doi:10.1525/ae.1998.25.2.166.
