= Dara Horn =

American writer, novelist and professor (born April 28, 1977)

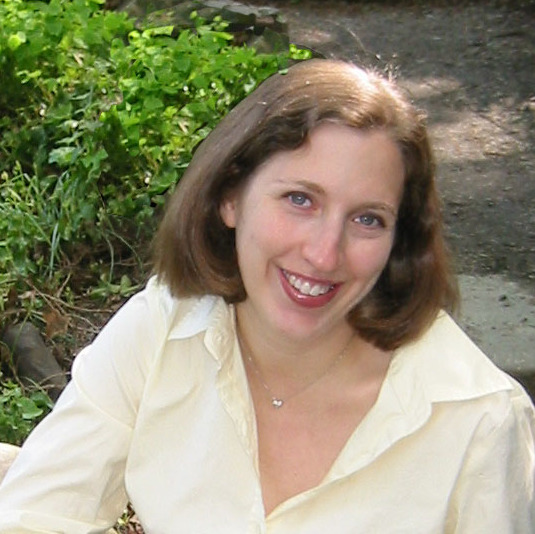
- Born: April 28, 1977 (age 49); New Jersey, US
- Education: Harvard University (BA, PhD); University of Cambridge
- Occupations: Author, professor
- Children: 4
- Writing career
- Language: English, Hebrew, Yiddish
- Period: 2002-present
- Notable works: In the Image; The World to Come; All Other Nights; A Guide for the Perplexed; Eternal Life; People Love Dead Jews
- Notable awards: Edward Lewis Wallant Award (2002); National Jewish Book Award (2003, 2006, and 2021); Harold U. Ribalow Prize (2007)
- Website: darahorn.com

Dara Horn (born April 28, 1977) is an American novelist, essayist, and professor of literature. She is a three-time winner of the National Jewish Book Award and a recipient of both the Ribalow Prize and Edward Lewis Wallant Award.

She published her first novel In the Image in 2002, which won the Edward Lewis Wallant Award and a National Jewish Book Award. Her second novel The World to Come in 2006 won a National Jewish Book Award and the Ribalow Prize and was named one of the best books of 2006 by the San Francisco Chronicle. In 2013, Horn published her fourth novel A Guide for the Perplexed. Her fifth novel Eternal Life was selected as one of The New York Times' 100 Notable Books of the Year in 2018.

Horn released her first nonfiction book People Love Dead Jews in 2021. The book, a collection of twelve essays, argues that the death of Jews receives more attention and commemoration than Jewish life. It was a finalist for the 2021 Kirkus Prize in nonfiction and selected as one of The New York Times' 100 Notable Books of 2018.

Horn released her second nonfiction book, The Final Solution to the Jewish Question: A Love Story for the Living, in September 2026. It is a series of short essays that argues that Judaism is a 3,000 year anti-tyrannical, counter-cultural movement and that antisemitism, fueled by tyrants since ancient times, is the lie that "Jews are responsible for destroying whatever a society values the most and that the only thing that changes, is what a society values."

In 2016, Horn founded the Tell Institute, an educational nonprofit dedicated to teaching Jewish culture and civilization.

== Early life and education ==
Horn was born in 1977 and grew up in Short Hills, New Jersey, with three siblings. She attended Millburn High School and was co-captain of the Quiz Bowl team. Her mother, Susan, was an English teacher with a Ph.D. in Jewish studies. Horn's father, Matthew, is a dentist. The family travelled internationally during her childhood, and her parents encouraged Horn and her siblings to write journals about their trips. When Horn was 14, she won a trip to Poland and Israel in a quiz competition about Israeli history, and then wrote an essay about her trip for Hadassah Magazine that was nominated for a National Magazine Award in 1993.

She received her BA in comparative literature, summa cum laude, in 1999 and her Ph.D. in comparative literature in Hebrew and Yiddish in 2006, both from Harvard University. She finished her master's degree in Hebrew literature at Cambridge University.

== Career ==
She taught classes in Jewish literature and Israeli history at Sarah Lawrence College and the City University of New York. She held the Weinstock visiting professorship in Jewish Studies at Harvard, teaching Yiddish and Hebrew literature. Horn served as a Distinguished Visiting Scholar at Yeshiva University during the 2019–2020 academic year. She has also been a contributor to the New York Times and The Atlantic.

=== Books ===
Horn's first novel, In the Image, published by W. W. Norton when she was 25, received a 2003 National Jewish Book Award and the 2002 Edward Lewis Wallant Award.

Her second novel, The World to Come, published by W. W. Norton in 2006, received the 2006 National Jewish Book Award for Fiction and the 2007 Ribalow Prize and was selected as an Editors' Choice in The New York Times Book Review and as one of the Best Books of 2006 by the San Francisco Chronicle. It has been translated into 11 languages.

Horn's third novel, All Other Nights, published in 2009 by W. W. Norton, was selected as an Editors' Choice in The New York Times Book Review.

Her fourth novel, A Guide for the Perplexed, was published in 2013. In the New York Times, Jami Attenberg wrote, "Horn has taught Jewish literature and history, and her writing comes from a place of deep knowledge and research...I admired Horn's intensity and integrity, much as I admired the same qualities in her characters."

Horn's fifth novel, Eternal Life, was published in 2018 by W. W. Norton. It was selected as one of The New York Times's 100 Notable Books of 2018.

Horn released her first nonfiction book, People Love Dead Jews, in 2021. The title is based on a 2018 Smithsonian Magazine article by Horn that began, "People love dead Jews. Living Jews, not so much", which is reprinted in the book as an essay titled "Everyone's (Second) Favorite Dead Jew." According to Yaniv Iczkovits in the New York Times, the essay collection explores the ways in which we commemorate Jewish tragedy. This includes writing about the Holocaust; the way the media represents antisemitic events; how museums honor Jewish heritage; the way we read literature with Jewish protagonists and even how we praise the Righteous Among the Nations (those who saved Jews during the war). He calls these "distractions from the main issue, which is the very concrete, specific death of Jews." In the Wall Street Journal, Marty Peretz wrote: "This is a beautiful book, and in its particular genre—nonfiction meditations on the murder of Jews, particularly in the Holocaust, and the place of the dead in the American imagination—it can have few rivals. In fact, I can't think of any." People Love Dead Jews was a finalist for the 2021 Kirkus Prize in nonfiction. The New York Times listed it as one of the 100 Notable books of 2021, and Publishers Weekly listed it in the top 20 books of the year. Tablet magazine produced a companion podcast, Adventures With Dead Jews, hosted by Horn, in which she explores topics in Jewish history not in the book.

Horn's second nonfiction book debuted at no. 6 on the New York Times bestseller list. The Final Solution to the Jewish Question: A Love Story for the Living examines the shortcomings of Holocaust education, given its focus on the Jews as victims of genocide rather than their centuries of achievement, survival, and resistance to tyranny. Horn describes the book's central theme as that of the "Big Lie" that fuels antisemitism: a pattern repeated throughout history that blames the Jews for destroying whatever a society values the most. She argues that all that changes is what particular societies value: "If piety was a society's ideal, Jews were impious blasphemers; if secularism was the ideal, Jews were backward pietists". Horn traces the roots of anti-Zionism as a political ideology to the Bolsheviks and the Soviet Union, predating Israel's independence by decades: "Zionism is racism. Zionism is colonialism. Zionism is apartheid. Zionism is genocide. These are all slogans that go back to the 1960s and 70s." In several chapters, Horn examines the compromises made by American Jews that shaped their "Golden Age". In "Cowardice at Harvard", she draws on her experience on Harvard's antisemitism advisory group and examines antisemitism and anti-Zionism at the university. Finally, Horn describes an orchestrated effort to "poison" online information sources with antisemitic propaganda. She argues that this risks embedding antisemitic ideology in future AI-generated knowledge.

== Advocacy ==
Horn founded the Tell Institute to tell the story of the Jewish people, that "Jews are among the first groups in history to stand up to tyranny, and to this day they continue to do so." The institute employs educators who write lesson plans and teacher trainings about "the groundbreaking ideas of Jewish civilization that continue to shape Jewish communities as well as the broader world".

== Views ==
At a March 2026 panel in New York City, Horn argued that the fight against antisemitism "had failed" and that "almost every mass educational effort that we call fighting antisemitism...has involved erasing who Jews are," adding, "There is no point in fighting antisemitism if we don't know what we're fighting for." She expressed concern that too little Jewish education had focused on Jewish knowledge, identity, and education. Horn maintains that it is an "antisemitic lie" to call Israel a settler-colonialist state.

== Personal life ==
Horn lives with her husband and four children. She has three siblings.

== Bibliography ==
- Horn, Dara (2002). In the Image. New York: W. W. Norton. ISBN 0-393-05106-4.
- Horn, Dara (2006). The World to Come. New York: W. W. Norton. ISBN 0-393-05107-2.
- Horn, Dara (2009). All Other Nights. New York: W. W. Norton. ISBN 978-0-393-06492-6.
- Horn, Dara (2013). A Guide for the Perplexed. New York: W. W. Norton. ISBN 978-0-393-06489-6.
- Horn, Dara (2018). Eternal Life. New York: W. W. Norton. ISBN 978-0-393-60853-3.
- Horn, Dara (2021). People Love Dead Jews. New York: W. W. Norton. ISBN 978-0-393-53157-2.
- Horn, Dara (September 1, 2026). The Final Solution to the Jewish Question: A Love Story for the Living. ISBN 1668090163.

== Honors ==
- 2002 Edward Lewis Wallant Award
- 2003 National Jewish Book Award
- 2006 National Jewish Book Award
- Best Books of 2006 by the San Francisco Chronicle
- Granta magazine, Best Young American Novelists, 2007
- 2007 Harold U. Ribalow Prize
- Finalist, 2021 Kirkus Prize in nonfiction
