= People Love Dead Jews =

2021 book by Dara Horn

- Author: Dara Horn
- Publisher: W. W. Norton & Company
- Publication date: September 7, 2021
- ISBN: 9780393531565

People Love Dead Jews: Reports from a Haunted Present is a 2021 non-fiction book by author and academic Dara Horn exploring the exploitation of Jewish history, particularly focusing on the fascination with Jewish deaths rather than respecting the lives and culture of the living Jewish community. The book, a collection of essays, covers various topics including the global veneration and universalization of Anne Frank, the commercialization of Jewish history in places like Harbin, China, and indifference to rising antisemitism. Horn critically analyzes the subtle dehumanization embedded in the public reverence given to past atrocities, arguing that this benign reverence is a significant affront to human dignity.

People Love Dead Jews won a 2021 National Jewish Book Award and was on several year-end best books of 2021 lists.

== Background and context ==
Author Dara Horn recounts an inspiring event for the book was at a Nashville quiz bowl tournament in the 1990s. Horn shared a room with two Mississippians, who discussed watching Mister Rogers. The Southerners were utterly convinced that (as children) Rogers was speaking directly to them through their TV screens — just like they absolutely knew that Jesus loved them. They waited for Horn to concur. When she instead mumbled something about synagogue, they looked stunned: "I thought Hitler said you all were dark [complexion]." Reflecting on that experience, Horn would realize that what people knew about Jews is that people killed them.

Horn explained that her mission with the book was to "unravel, document, describe, and articulate the endless unspoken ways in which the popular obsession with dead Jews, even in its most apparently benign and civic-minded forms, is a profound affront to human dignity."

In an interview with The Atlantic, Horn argues, that Western society prefers to tell stories about how Jews died, rather than how they lived, because "it's much easier to mold dead Jews into martyrs and morality tales than it is to coexist with living ones." Horn mentions that the book attempts to confront common excuses for not caring about antisemitism, such as that antisemitism is not systemic and antisemitic incidents are all "lone wolf" events or committed by deranged individuals. She also mentions that the "Jews are rich" stereotype, which is regularly used to justify antisemitism, is not used as an excuse for prejudice against Hindus, who are one of the wealthiest minority religious groups in the United States and United Kingdom.

== Synopsis ==
People Love Dead Jews consists of twelve essays exploring how Jewish tragedy is commemorated, how the Holocaust is written about, how news media present antisemitic events, how museums honor Jewish heritage, how society reads literature with Jewish protagonists are all distractions from the main issue, which is the specific deaths of Jews. According to Horn, much of how Jewish history is remembered and narrated is at best, self-deception, and at worst, rubbish. Society is fascinated with the death of Jews, but cares little for living Jews. To Horn, the destruction of world Jewry is a compelling historic narrative, but the current crisis of antisemitism is minimized.

Writing about the Shakespeare play The Merchant of Venice, Horn argues that taking the play in through Jewish eyes reveals "just how deep the gaslighting went," as critics ignore phrases such as, "Certainly the Jew is the very devil incarnate" to insist that Shakespeare portrayed Jewish character Shylock's humanity. As Horn relistens to an audio version of the play, she realized she had been conditioned to accept Shylock's famous soliloquy "Hath not a Jew eyes" as Shakespeare's attempt at humanization, rather than justification that he is treated poorly because there is something repulsive about him, such as his Jewishness.

Horn demonstrates that Jewish literature often invokes the horrors of Jewish past, ignoring the uplifting messages of grace more common in Western Christian literary traditions. In a discussion about the enormous success of The Diary of a Young Girl, the diary of Anne Frank, Horn examines the diary's most famous sentence, "I still believe, in spite of everything, that people are truly good at heart". In Horn's view, Frank's words are inspirational as people look for universal lessons rather than attending to the actual persecution of Jews. The first published editions of the diary were carefully edited to strip away too much Jewish specificity about Frank, whom Horn calls "Everyone's (Second) Favorite Dead Jew" after Jesus.

Horn then turns to Harbin, China, a city that sought to attract Jewish entrepreneurs at the end of the 19th century to construct its buildings and run its hotels. The local government promised Jews that if they came, antisemitic laws and pogroms would not follow, and at its peak, there were 20,000 Jews in the city. By 2021, there was just one Jew remaining. Today, Harbin advertises its "Jewish Heritage", which Horn quips should be renamed "Property Seized from Dead or Expelled Jews."

Over three chapters called "Dead American Jews", Horn discusses the growth of antisemitism in the United States. To Horn, by setting the bar of antisemitism as the Holocaust, "anything short of the Holocaust is, well, not the Holocaust." Therefore, antisemitic events such as the Pittsburgh synagogue shooting, the Poway synagogue shooting, and the 2019 Jersey City shooting have a short shelf life. Horn writes that the "public shame associated with expressing antisemitism was dying too. In other words, hating Jews was normal."

Horn discusses the attacks on Hasidic Jews before the onset of the COVID-19 pandemic, writing that she was shocked that almost every article about the attacks also said something derogatory about the community in the process. To Horn, this is signaling to the public that these people had it coming to them.

Horn then turns inward to the Jewish community. She asks why Jews cling to the apocryphal legend that immigration agents changed the names of Jews at Ellis Island, which was disproven by historian Kirsten Fermaglich. According to Horn, if Jews told the truth about American antisemitism, they would look like fools, coming to a land they thought promised the American Dream, but where they couldn't get hired with a last name like Rosenberg. Therefore, it would prove that America was not different in the prejudice, discrimination and violence that Jews faced.

== Reception ==
=== Praise ===
Writing in the New York Times, Yaniv Iczkovits called People Love Dead Jews a "brilliant" and "outstanding book with a bold mission" that "criticizes people, artworks and public institutions that few others dare to challenge."

Historian Pamela Nadell in the Washington Post called the book "riveting [and] gorgeously written". She compared Horn's argument to Nadell's academic work arguing that the focus on the Holocaust in American education has "let Americans off the hook" in realizing that antisemitism is not just an Old World phenomenon.

Yair Rosenberg wrote in The Atlantic that book is "compulsively readable, pugnaciously provocative, yet profoundly humanizing," and that its argument was "stark". He describes the book as a "whirlwind world tour" where readers "meet a host of colorful characters" from Jewish history.

Katherine E. Aron-Beller reviewed the book in H-Net, praising Horn's "chatty style and sarcastic wit [that] make this a provocative read." Aron-Beller notes "one of the strongest messages of the book" is Horn's critique of the pedagogical lens educators use "to reaffirm the facile moral values of their society rather than taking political lessons from the Holocaust"—that is, focusing on "everything but antisemitism". Aron-Beller concludes some of the chapters of the book would suit university courses focused on contemporary antisemitism.

=== Criticism ===
Historian Sara Lipton praises the emotive power of Horn's writing in The New York Review of Books but criticizes Horn's "mixture of insight, eloquence, and myopia" which creates a seductive yet overly simplistic vision of Jewish history across different times and places. She writes that "Horn displays a regrettable tendency to confuse analyzing the causes of anti-Semitism with excusing anti-Semitism; she apparently finds relief in abandoning inquiry and simply concluding that 'hating Jews [is] normal.'" Lipton writes, "The problem is that this eloquent exponent of Jewish life and culture presents a selective picture of Jewishness, cropping a rich, messy, diverse, and complex history so as to fit into a reduced and tightly focused frame."

Historian Alexander Jabbari likened the book to Salo Baron's lachrymose conception of Jewish history and Shaul Magid's concept of Judeopessimism, that "antisemitism transcends history and forms the basis of civilisation." A historian of the Middle East, Jabbari criticizes Horn's chapter "Dead Jews of the Desert" for its lack of discussion about "Jewish-Muslim coexistence" and her description of "the region as 'Judenrein' following [the expulsions of the mid-20th century], thus illustrating what the historian Lior Sternfeld called the 'Holocaustisation' of Middle Eastern Jewish history." Jabbari writes, "Understanding the contexts that help produce racist hatred and persecution, whether historical or present, is a crucial tool for struggling against them. And a worldview based in perpetual victimhood is neither healthy nor a useful way to overcome antisemitism."

Rob Eshman praises the book in The Forward as "a deeply researched, powerfully written and provocative book, deserving of its runaway success and awards," but takes issue with a number of its characterizations. He summarizes the book's argument "that people memorialize dead Jews in ways that prevent us from understanding the reality of their suffering and blind us to the real issues living Jews face today," but faults Horn for not considering the broader context and shortcomings of "mythmaking and meaning-making". He suggests a similar multivolume work could be written about the plight of Native Americans, but "Horn seems to assume this is just a Jewish issue." Furthermore, Eshman writes that Horn "rushes by evidence that doesn’t fit her argument", providing a few examples of Holocaust testimony that would fit her description of didactic Christian misrepresentation of the Holocaust. He also cites survey evidence showing that "negative feelings toward Jews were actually higher in the years Horn thinks of as normal" and affirming, contrary to Horn's suggestion, "[i]n America, in 2022, hating Jews is deeply abnormal."

=== Prizes and recognition ===
People Love Dead Jews won a 2021 National Jewish Book Award in the "Contemporary Jewish Life and Practice" category. and was on Publishers Weekly's and Mosaic Magazine's lists of best books of 2021.

== Adaptations ==
Tablet magazine produced a companion podcast, Adventures With Dead Jews, hosted by Horn, where she explores topics in Jewish history that didn't make it into the book.

== Impact ==
Due to the conversation sparked by the book, Horn was considered an expert on the rise in antisemitism, particularly after the October 7 attacks on Israel. Horn launched a nonprofit called Mosaic Persuasion to supplement traditional education about Jewish history with content about Jewish civilization and the causes of antisemitism.

== See also ==
- Antisemitism in Europe
- Antisemitism in the United States
- The Final Solution to the Jewish Question
