= Facts on the Ground =

2001 archaeology book by Nadia Abu El Haj

Facts on the Ground: Archaeological Practice and Territorial Self-Fashioning in Israeli Society
- Author: Nadia Abu El Haj
- Genre: Non-fiction
- Publication date: 2001

Facts on the Ground: Archaeological Practice and Territorial Self-Fashioning in Israeli Society is a 2001 book by Nadia Abu El Haj based on her doctoral thesis at Duke University. The book has been praised by some scholars and criticised by others.

Controversy over the book intensified five years after its publication, after news emerged in 2006 that Abu El Haj was under consideration for tenure at Barnard College where she served as an assistant professor. Barnard alumnae mounted a campaign to deny tenure to Abu El Haj that centered on what they described as the book's anti-Israel bias, prompting a counter-campaign in support of the book and Abu El Haj. The university ultimately granted Abu El Haj tenure in November 2007.

== Contents ==
In the book, Abu El Haj uses anthropological methods to study the relationship between the development of scientific knowledge in Israeli archaeology and the construction of the social imaginations and political orders in the Israeli State and what she characterizes as the "formation and enactment of its colonial-national historical imagination and...the substantiation of its territorial claims". She argues that facts generated by archaeological practice have fashioned "cultural understandings, political possibilities and 'common-sense' assumptions".

=== Positive Facts of Nationhood ===
The book argues that archeology plays a fundamental role in the construction and reaffirmation of Israeli national identity, focusing on the observation of material facts and empirical evidence. This archaeological practice becomes a means to objectify and legitimize Israeli nationality. In general, the text provides a critical and reflective vision of how archeology is intertwined with the construction of national identity and how historical and chronological debates contribute to this narrative.

The chapter "Positive Facts of Nationhood" focuses on the debate surrounding the Israelite settlement in the Upper Galilee region and examines how this debate was intertwined with the construction of the nation-state of Israel. Throughout the text, the implications of this debate on archaeology and its relationship with national identity are discussed.

According to the text, the debate on the Israelite settlement in the Upper Galilee during the 1950s and 1960s played a significant role in the construction of the Israeli nation-state. This region posed significant challenges to the newly established Jewish state, as most of the Arab population resided in the Lower Galilee. The government implemented efforts to "Judaize" the region, which included the relocation of Jewish immigrants, mostly from North Africa, to the Upper Galilee. Archaeologist Yigael Yadin played a prominent role in this process, leading excavations at Hazor. He saw these excavations as a contribution to the nation, not only in archaeological terms but also in terms of job creation and promotion of the local economy. Archaeology became an integral part of territorial expansion and the consolidation of the Israeli nation-state. The Yedi'at ha-Aretz conference of 1958 emphasized the importance of the Israelite settlement in Galilee and its relationship with the ancient history of Israel. Conference participants toured historical sites in the region, linking biblical history with contemporary reality. However, the debate on chronology and archaeological evidence could not resolve the question of when the Israelite conquest occurred.

The chapter explores how archaeological practice was linked to the construction of the Israeli nation-state. Excavations in the Hazor region were considered a contribution to the history of Israel and a means to assert the Israelite presence in antiquity. It highlights the importance of national identity in this debate. The nation is presented as a material and historical entity, and archaeology is used to support and strengthen this identity. Observation and material evidence become key tools in defining and affirming Israeli nationality. The intersection between archaeological science and nationalist ideology is raised. It is argued that archaeology is based on an empiricist tradition that emphasizes observation and objectivity, which, in turn, contributes to the construction of a historical narrative that reinforces national identity. It is emphasized that the debate on the chronology of the Israelite conquest of Hazor was a central part of the debate on the Israelite settlement. The dating of historical events becomes a fundamental issue in the construction of national history. The question of what makes someone Israeli and how ethnic identity is defined is raised. It is suggested that archaeology contributes to the definition of this identity through the observation of material cultural remains.

== Reception ==
Facts on the Ground has been widely reviewed in both scholarly and popular publications. It was one of the winners of the 2002 Albert Hourani Book Award, granted by the Middle East Studies Association of North America for outstanding publishing in Middle East studies. Jere Bacharach, a MESA member and historian at the University of Washington, described the book as a "nuanced, nonpolemic work".

The book has received both accolades, particularly from Abu El Haj's fellow anthropologists, and denunciations, from some archaeologists, whose colleagues' work she criticizes. According to Jane Kramer, writing in The New Yorker, "the book was praised by colleagues who responded to the critical tropes that were Abu El Haj's legacy from scholars like Michel Foucault, Ian Hacking, Bruno Latour, and Edward Said, and dismissed by colleagues with a theoretical or a political or simply a turf interest in dismissing it."

=== Academic reviews (chronologically-ordered) ===
In the MIT Electronic Journal of Middle East Studies, Elia Zureik, a professor of sociology at Queen's University, writes that Abu El Haj's "use of the sociology of science as a perspective in her research is both clever and refreshing. It further elevates research about Palestine to new heights, by placing it squarely in current social science literature and debates. We need more such studies."

Edward Said wrote of being "indebted" to the book and work of Abu El Haj, in Freud and the Non-European (2003), offering that:

What she provides first of all is a history of systematic colonial archaeological exploration in Palestine, dating back to British work in the mid-nineteenth century. She then continues the story in the period before Israel is established, connecting the actual practice of archaeology with a nascent national ideology - an ideology with plans for the repossession of the land through renaming and resettling, much of it given archeological justification as a schematic extraction of Jewish identity despite the existence of Arab names and traces of other civilizations. This effort, she argues convincingly, epistemologically prepares the way for a fully fledged post-1948 sense of Israeli-Jewish identity based on assembling discrete archaeological particulars -scattered remnants of masonry, tablets, bones, tombs..."

In her review of Facts on the Ground for American Ethnologist, Kimbra L. Smith professor of anthropology at the University of Colorado at Colorado Springs, writes that "Abu El Haj provides an important and timely look at some of the politics of self-representation behind the Israeli government's public face, within a broader argument about science's capacity for political involvement and for maintaining and even advancing colonialist policies. However [...] her failure to present either official Palestinian or public Palestinian/Israeli opinions and attitudes within the context of Israel's (settler) nationalist-archaeological discipline means that answers to the excellent questions she raises are never made clear."

Apen Ruiz, at the University of Texas at Austin, writes in H-Net that "Facts on the Ground offers a unique and pioneering approach to examine the politics of archaeological research." He explains that, "Inspired by cultural and social studies of science, El-Haj puts archaeology under an ethnographic lens and examines its practices: excavating, surveying, cataloguing, naming, mapping, and exhibiting," noting that it is this, "focus on archaeological practices as the main object of study," that is the "primary contribution of the book".

Aren Maeir, professor of archaeology at Bar Ilan University, writing in Isis, calls the book "a highly ideologically driven political manifesto, with a glaring lack of attention both to details and to the broader context." Regarding Abu El Haj's criticism of methodology in Israeli archeology, Maeir writes, that in contemporary archeology in Israel, "only marginal elements act in accordance with or identify with the non-scientific agendas that she attempts to delineate." Maeir argues that the major reason for the lateness of Israel to adopt modern techniques was not a "hidden colonial agenda," but rather a result of the "European classical archeology" from which it developed.

James Gelvin, a UCLA historian, describes Facts on the Ground in his book The Israel-Palestine Conflict: One Hundred Years of War, as "probably the most sophisticated presentation of Israel's archaeological obsession and its relation to nationalism and 'colonial knowledge'".

Alexander H. Joffe, an archaeologist and past director of the pro-Israel organization Campus Watch, writes in the Journal of Near Eastern Studies that "Abu El Haj's anthropology is undone by her [...] ill-informed narrative, intrusive counter-politics, and by her unwillingness to either enter or observe Israeli society [...] The effect is a representation of Israeli archaeology that is simply bizarre."

Keith Whitelam, professor of religious studies at the University of Sheffield and author of The Invention of Ancient Israel: The Silencing of Palestinian History, told a New York Sun reporter that Facts on the Ground was a "first-rate book," which made "a very fine contribution" to the study of "how national identity is constructed and the assumptions which are then built into academic work on history and archaeology." In the same article, William Dever, a retired professor of Middle Eastern archaeology at the University of Arizona, describes Abu El Haj's scholarship as "faulty, misleading and dangerous".

Alan F. Segal, a professor of religion and Jewish studies at Barnard College, has been a vocal critic of the book. In the Columbia Daily Spectator, he writes that Abu El Haj's work is tainted by a failure to examine primary sources in Hebrew, a reliance on anonymous sources, and a lack of breadth in its review of scholarship to date. According to Segal, Abu El Haj focuses her attention on the "extreme conclusions" of "biblical minimalists" who constitute "no more than a handful of scholars" out of "thousands at work (in Biblical scholarship) in the world". Segal writes that "none of the minimalist scholars she relies upon for this purpose is actually a working archaeologist," and that "pretty much every other one of the virtually countless theories about Israelite settlement in First Temple times would disprove her hypothesis about Israeli archaeology." He adds that she "does not tell her readers about" these fields, "why they are necessary", or, "how decisions are actually made in biblical studies."

In the fall 2007 issue of The Current, there was criticism of Abu El Haj from three different scholars. First, David M. Rosen, professor of anthropology at Fairleigh Dickinson University asks, "How can a work that apparently demonstrates an impaired understanding of the archeological sciences be regarded as good anthropology?" Answering his own question, he offers that while in the contemporary political climate, "One hardly needs to be Braveheart to be openly antagonistic to Israel at a meeting of anthropologists," the more serious problem lies in the tradition of post-colonial studies, where anthropologists like Abu El Haj can "construct their analyses with little concern for empirical or logical connectedness. Like mythology, they are masters of the found object, and pull in anything to create a story. This methodology has no connection to science. Its power lies in its politics and its aesthetics, and not in such boring ideas as validity and reliability." In the same issue, Jonathan Rosenbaum, paleographer and President of Gratz College, suggests that Abu El Haj's "personal agenda" is "the furtherance of her own nationalistic ideology at the expense of decades of careful excavations and rigorous publications" establishing the historicity of much of the Biblical narrative. Finally, James R. Russell, a professor at Harvard University, describes Facts on the Ground as a "malign fantasy" designed to demonstrate the "colonial essence" of Zionism by denying the history of ancient "Jewish sovereignty and long historical presence."

=== Bulldozer use ===
One controversy related to the book came from a passage in Facts on the Ground in which Abu El Haj wrote that during a dig in Jezreel, British and Israeli archaeologists used "bulldozers ... in order to get down to the earlier strata, which are saturated with national significance, as quickly as possible." She noted that "among Palestinian officials at the Haram al-Sharif and the Awqaf as well as many other archaeologists ... the use of bulldozers has become the ultimate sign of 'bad science' and of nationalist politics guiding research agendas." She wrote that the incident took place "a week after [she] stopped participating in the excavations" and attributed the account to "several participants, both archaeologists and student volunteers," whom she did not name.

The dig in question was led by David Ussishkin of the University of Tel Aviv, who responded to Abu El Haj's characterization in an open letter published on the internet in December 2006. While confirming that the earlier strata was the main interest of the dig, Ussishkin denied that any damage was done to other strata, which he insisted were properly excavated. Ussishkin defended the use of the bulldozer at the site as being necessary to properly excavate the site, and said he did not believe it had caused any damage.

In September 2007, archaeologist Aren Maeir, in an opinion column in the Columbia Daily Spectator student newspaper, wrote, "In her book she attacks, harangues, vilifies and slanders respected archaeologists in the field." According to Maeir, Abu El Haj's assertions concerning Ussishkin are "analogous to accusing a surgeon of deciding whether to use a scalpel or a hacksaw according to the patient's ethnic 'identity'" and "an attempt to prevent him from doing his work."

Abu El Haj does not mention Ussishkin by name in her book.

== See also ==
- Ancient Near East
- Biblical archaeology
- History of ancient Israel and Judah
- History of the Jews in the Land of Israel
- History of the Levant
- History of Palestine
- Pre-history of the Levant
- Levantine archaeology
