= Talmud Torah =

Jewish religious schooling program

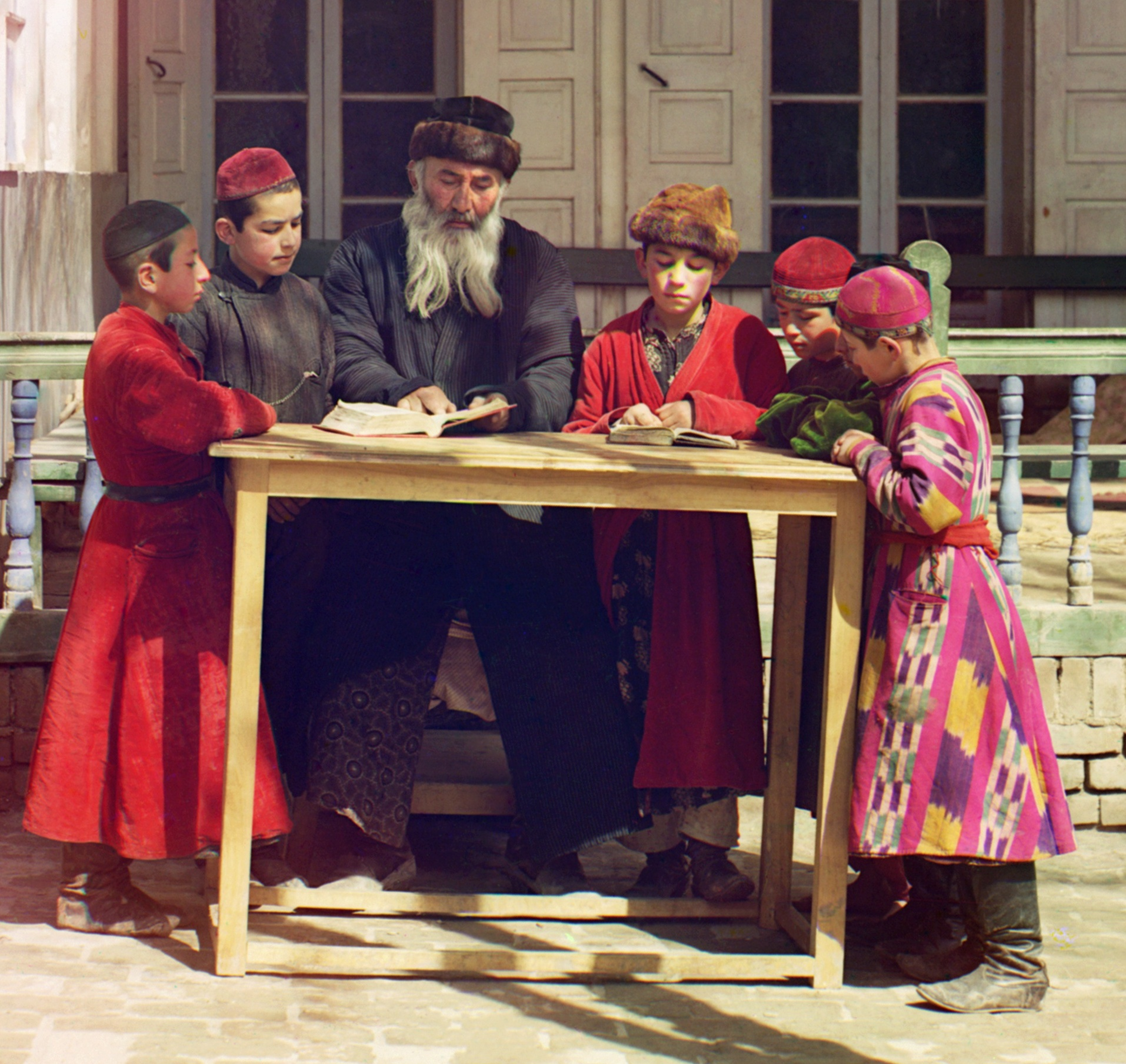
Torah study of Bukharan Jews in Samarkand, Russian Empire. Photograph by Sergey Prokudin-Gorsky (1905–1915).

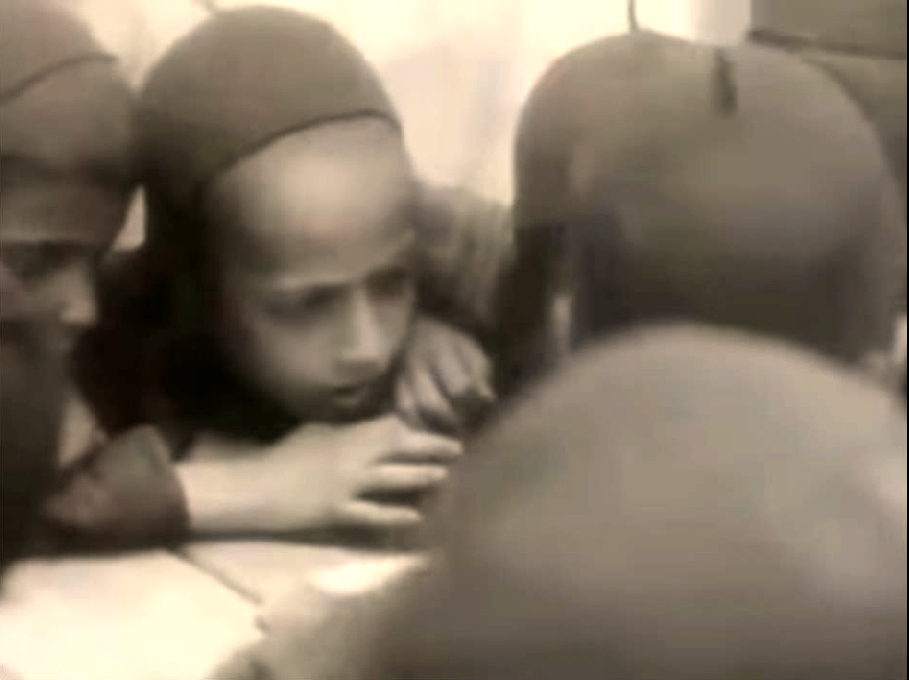
Torah study of Yemenite Jews, from a Soviet-era film documentary directed by Vladimir Shneyderov in the Mutawakkilite Kingdom of Yemen (1929)

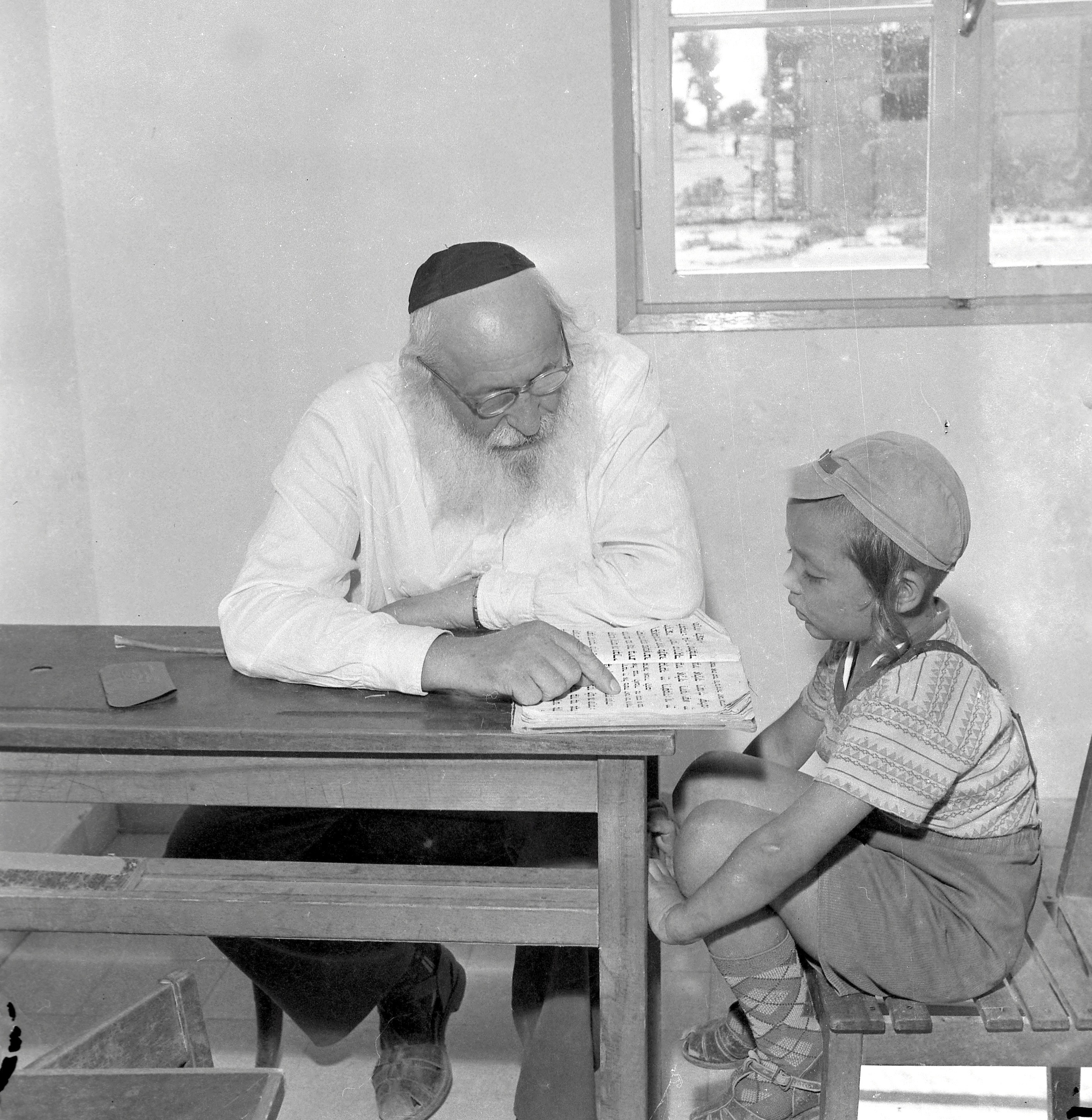
A student listening to his teacher during a Talmud Torah, Bnei Brak, Israel (1965)

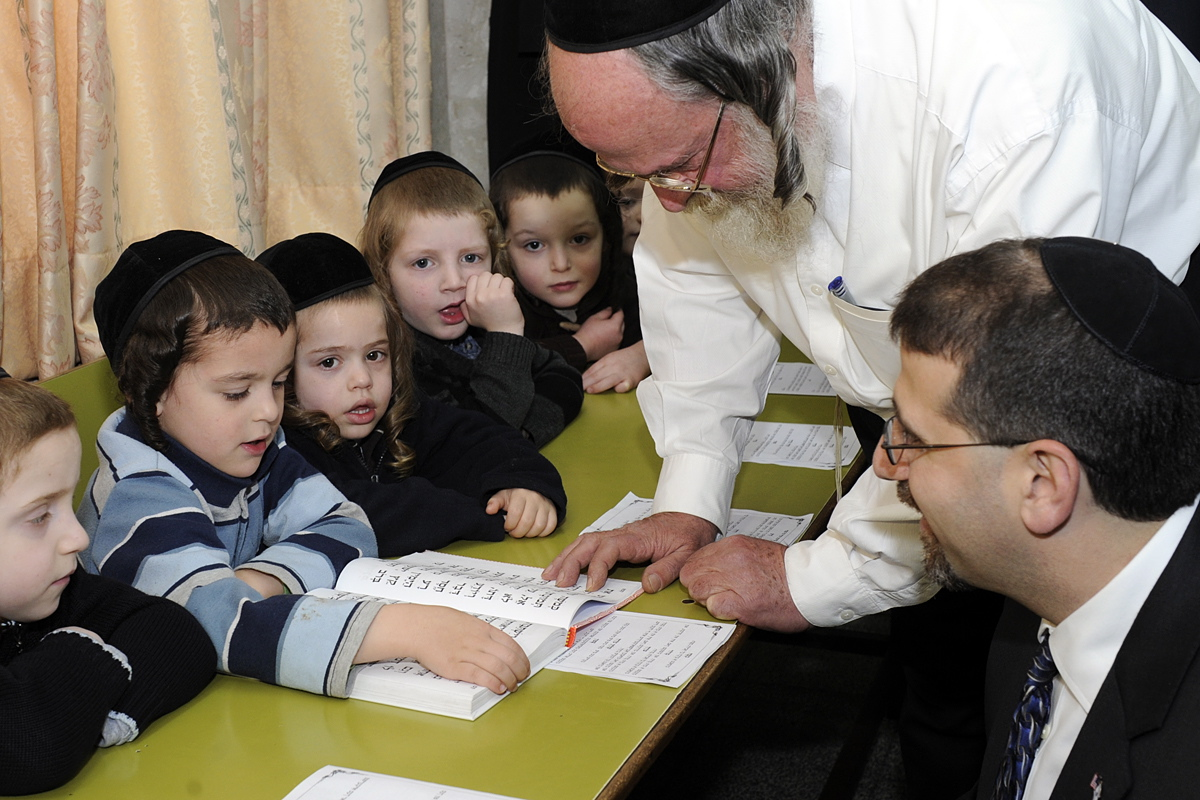
Haredi Jews during a Talmud Torah in Mea She'arim, Jerusalem (2000s)

In the history of Judaism, Talmud Torah (Hebrew: תלמוד תורה, lit. "Study of the Torah") is a form of religious school that was created in the Jewish diaspora among all ethnicities of Jews (Ashkenazim, Mizrahim, Sephardim, etc.) for the education of boys and girls of modest backgrounds, where they were given an elementary education in Hebrew and the Jewish sacred scriptures (especially the Torah), and the Talmud (and halakha). This was meant to prepare them for yeshiva or, particularly in the movement's modern form, for Jewish education at a high school level. The Talmud Torah was modeled after the cheder, a traditional form of schooling whose essential elements it incorporated, with changes appropriate to its public form rather than the cheder's private financing through less formal or institutionalized mechanisms, including tuition fees and donations.

Given the nature of Torah study in Judaism, which involves extensive citation and cross-referencing among hundreds of texts written over the course of thousands of years, Talmud Torah typically involves learning the fundamental principles and practices of Jewish faith through the main didactic and religious Jewish literary sources, including the Tanakh, Babylonian Talmud, Jerusalem Talmud, Mishnah, Tosefta, Pirkei Avot, and Jewish prayer books. In the United States, the term Talmud Torah refers to the afternoon program for Jewish–American boys and girls after attending public school. This form of Jewish education was prevalent from the mid–19th century through "the 1940s and 1950s." Although by the 1980s full-time Jewish day schools (yeshivas) were the norm in the United States, some Eastern European countries still had these.

== History ==
The father was traditionally the sole teacher of his children in Jewish history (Deut. xi. 19). The institution known as the bei rav or bet rabban (house of the teacher), or as the bei safra or bet sefer (house of the book), is said to have been originated by Ezra and his Great Assembly, who provided a public school in Jerusalem to secure the education of fatherless boys of the age of sixteen years and above. But the school system did not develop until Joshua ben Gamla the high priest caused public schools to be opened in every town and hamlet for all children above six or seven years of age (B. B. 21a).

The expense was borne by the community, and strict discipline was observed. Abba Arika, however, ordered Samuel b. Shilat to deal tenderly with the pupils, to refrain from corporal punishment, or at most to use a shoe-strap in correcting pupils for inattention. A stupid pupil was made monitor until able to grasp the art of learning. Rabbah bar Nahmani fixed the number of pupils at twenty-five for one teacher; if the number was between twenty-five and forty an assistant teacher ("resh dukana") was necessary; and for over forty, two teachers were required.

Only married men were engaged as teachers, but there is a difference of opinion regarding the qualification of the melammed (teacher). Rabbah bar Nahmani preferred one who taught his pupils much, even though somewhat carelessly, while Rav Dimi of Nehardea preferred one who taught his pupils little, but that correctly, as an error in reading once adopted is hard to correct (ib.). It is, of course, assumed that both qualifications were rarely to be found in one person.

The teaching in the Talmud Torah consumed the whole day, and in the winter months a few hours of the night besides. Teaching was suspended in the afternoon of Friday, and in the afternoon of the day preceding a holy day. On Shabbat and holy days, no new lessons were assigned; but the work of the previous week was reviewed on Shabbat afternoons by the child's parent or guardian (Shulḥan 'Aruk, Yoreh De'ah, 245).

In later times, possibly influenced by the Christian parochial schools of the 12th–13th centuries, the reading of the prayers and benedictions and the teaching of the principles of Jewish faith and practices were included. In almost every Jewish community, an organization called Hevra Talmud Torah was formed, whose duty was to create a fund and provide means for the support of public schools, and to control all teachers and pupils.

Asher ben Jehiel (1250–1328) ruled to allow withdrawals from the funds of the Talmud Torah for the purpose of meeting the annual tax collected by the local governor, since otherwise great hardships would fall upon the poor, who were liable to be stripped of all their belongings if they failed in the prompt payment of their taxes (Responsa, rule vi., § 2). On the other hand, money from the general charity fund was at times employed to support the Talmud Torah, and donations for a synagogue or cemetery were similarly used (ib. rule xiii., §§ 5,14).

Because Talmudic and Torah education was traditionally deemed obligatory for males and not females, Talmud Torahs were traditionally single-sex institutions. It is common even in the present day for men to continue their full-time Torah studies well into their third decade of life while women marry.

The Talmud Torah organization in Rome included eight societies in 1554, and was reconstituted August 13, 1617 (Rieger, "Gesch. der Juden in Rom," p. 316, Berlin, 1895). Later, certain synagogues assumed the name "Talmud Torah," as in the case of one at Fez in 1603 (Ankava, "Kerem Ḥemed," ii. 78, Leghorn, 1869) and one at Cairo. This was probably because the school was held in or adjoined the synagogue.

== Funding ==
The income of the society was derived from several sources:

(a) one-sixth of the Monday and Thursday contributions in the synagogues and other places of worship;
(b) donations at circumcisions from guests invited to the feast;
(c) donations at weddings from the groom and the bride and from invited guests;
(d) one-tenth of the collections in the charity-box known as the mattan ba-setar.

Samuel de Medina (1505–1589) ruled that in case of a legacy left by will to a Talmud Torah and guaranteed by the testator's brother, the latter was not held liable if the property had been consumed owing to the prolonged illness of the deceased (Responsa, Ḥoshen Mishpaṭ, No. 357). A legacy for the support of a yeshivah and Talmud Torah in a certain town, if accompanied by a provision that it may be managed "as the son of the testator may see fit," may be transferred, it was declared, to a yeshivah elsewhere (ib. Oraḥ Ḥayyim, i., No. 60; see also "Paḥad Yiẓḥaḳ," s.v., p. 43a).

== Administration ==
The election of officers was made by ballot: three gabba'im, three vice-gabba'im, and a treasurer. Only learned and honorable men over 36 years of age were eligible for election. The taḳḳanot regulating these sources of the Talmud Torah's income were in existence in the time of Moses Isserles. In 1638 Yoel Sirkis, rabbi of Kraków, endorsed these regulations and added many others, all of which were confirmed at a general assembly of seventy representatives of the congregations on the 25th of Ṭebet, 5398 (1638; F. H. Wetstein, "Ḳadmoniyyot," document No. 1, Cracow, 1892).

Elijah ben Solomon Abraham ha-Kohen (1640–1729) decided that it requires the unanimous consent of the eight trustees of a Talmud Torah to engage teachers where a resolution has been passed that "no trustee or trustees shall engage the service of a Melamed without the consent of the whole" (Responsa, ii., No. 89, ed. Venice, 1592). As a specimen of the medieval organization of these schools, that of the Kraków schools may be selected. From the congregational record (pinḳes) of Kraków in 1551, it appears that the Talmud Torah society controlled both private and public schools. It passed the following taḳḳanot, or Jewish legal writs:

(1) The members shall have general supervision over the teachers and shall visit the Talmud Torah every week to see that the pupils are properly taught.

(2) No melamed may teach the Torah except with the translation "Be'er Mosheh" (Judæo-German transl. by Moses b. Issachar, Prague, 1605), "which is in our vernacular"; for the advanced pupils, he shall use no other than Rashi's commentary.

(3) A melamed in the primary class shall teach not more than twenty-five pupils and shall have two assistants.

(4) One melamed shall not compete with another during the term of his engagement, and shall not seek to obtain a pupil in charge of another teacher, even at the expiration of the term, unless the father or the guardian of the pupil desires to make a change.

(5) The members of the Ḥebra Talmud Torah shall hire a competent and God-fearing melamed, with an assistant, for poor and orphaned boys at the bet ha-midrash.

(6) The melamed and assistant shall teach pupils the Hebrew alphabet (with the vowels), the Siddur, the Torah (with the "Be'er Mosheh" translation), Rashi's commentary, the order of Jewish prayers, etiquette, and good behavior—every boy according to his grade and intelligence; also reading and writing in the vernacular. The more advanced shall be taught Hebrew grammar and arithmetic; those of the highest grade shall study Talmud with Rashi and Tosafot.

(7) Boys near the age of thirteen shall learn the regulations regarding tefillin.

(8) At the age of fourteen a boy who is incapable of learning Talmud shall be taught a trade or become a servant in a household.

== Curriculum ==
In the history of European Jewry, the Sephardim are said to have conducted their Talmud Torah schools more methodically than the Ashkenazim. The one in Amsterdam was highly praised by Shabbethai Horowitz ("Wawe ha-'Ammudim", p. 9b, appended to "Shelah", Amsterdam, 1698). Shabbethai Bass, in the introduction to his Sifte Yeshanim (p. 8a, ib. 1680), describes this Talmud Torah and wishes it might serve as a model for other schools:

It is built near the synagogue, and has six rooms, each accommodating a separate class under a melamed. The first class is for small boys who are learning to read their prayers. In the second class they learn the Pentateuch from beginning to end, with the musical accents. In the third, they translate the Pentateuch into the vernacular and use the Rashi commentary, divided into the regular weekly sidrot.

In the fourth, they learn the Prophets and the Hagiographa, with the proper accents and translation. In the fifth, they learn grammar and begin upon a series of halakhic excerpts from the Talmud, the text being in Hebrew and the explanations in the vernacular. Before the approach of a holy day they memorize the laws in the Shulchan Aruch pertaining to that holy day. The sixth class is preparatory to the yeshivah in the bet ha-midrash, and is conducted by the ḥakam-rabbi. In this class every day one halakhah, with the commentaries of Rashi and the Tosafot, is studied, and compared with the conclusions in the codes of Maimonides, Asheri, and Caro.

The hours of study are from 8 to 11 in the morning, and from 2 to 5 in the afternoon; in winter, till the Mincha prayer. The expense of maintaining this school is defrayed from a fund contributed by the members of the Ḥebra Talmud Torah. This Sephardic school made an exception to the rule of keeping the pupils in Talmud Torah all day, and a few hours of the night in the short winter days.

== In the Jewish diaspora ==
=== Germany ===
From 1724 to 1744, the Talmud Torah at Nikolsburg, Margraviate of Moravia, in the Holy Roman Empire (today in the Czech Republic), gave poor boys an education equal to that which was offered their more fortunate companions. The studies consisted of Siddur, Chumash (Pentateuch), and Talmud (Moritz Güdemann, Quellenschriften zur Gesch. des Unterrichts und der Erziehung bei den Deutschen Juden, p. 275). The schools in Central and Eastern Europe retained the ancient type and methods of the Ashkenazic schools up to the middle of the 19th century, when a movement for improvement and better management took place in the larger cities.

=== Ireland ===
In Dublin, both Stratford National School and Stratford College in Rathgar are managed under the patronage of the Dublin Talmud Torah. Stratford College was founded in 1954 by the Dublin Jewish Community and has a multi-denominational ethos but is also committed to the religious education and formation of its Jewish students.

=== Jerusalem ===
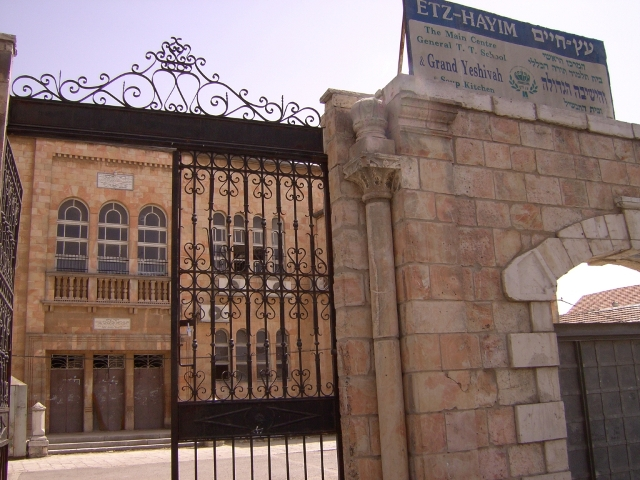
Etz Chaim Talmud Torah in Jerusalem

In Jerusalem, the Talmud Torah of the Sephardim, called Tiferet Yerushalayim, was reorganized by the Hakham Bashi rabbi Raphael Meir Panigel in 1891, with 300 pupils and 13 teachers. The boys learned Arabic and arithmetic in addition to other subjects, which ranged from the Hebrew alphabet to the Talmud. The time of study was from sunrise to sunset. The largest contributions for the support of the school came from the Sassoon family, Baghdadi Jews of Bombay and Calcutta, through the meshullachim.

The Ashkenazic Talmud Torah and Etz Chaim Yeshiva, with 35 teachers and over 1,000 pupils, succeeded the school established by Judah He-Hasid. It was started with a fund contributed by Hirsch Wolf Fischbein and David Janover in 1860. The annual expenditure was in 1910 about $10,000, over half of which was collected in the United States. The Talmud Torah and yeshiva Sha'are Torah were established and organized in 1886 by N. H. Lewi in Jaffa, with 9 teachers and 9 classes for 102 boys. Its expenses were about 2,000 dollars yearly, mostly covered by donations from abroad.

=== Russia ===
In 1857 at Odessa, Odessky Uyezd, in the Russian Empire (today in Ukraine), the Talmud Torah, which had existed ever since the city was chartered, was reorganized into a model school by distinguished pedagogues. In 1881, S. J. Abramowitch was appointed principal over 400 pupils. In 1904 two branches were opened in the suburbs with an additional 400 pupils. The boys were furnished text-books and clothing for free. Expenses were altogether 20,000 rubles annually. Every major city within the Pale of Settlement in Imperial Russia had a similar school. The income was derived from a Jewish tax on Kosher meat and from private contributions.

=== United States and Canada ===
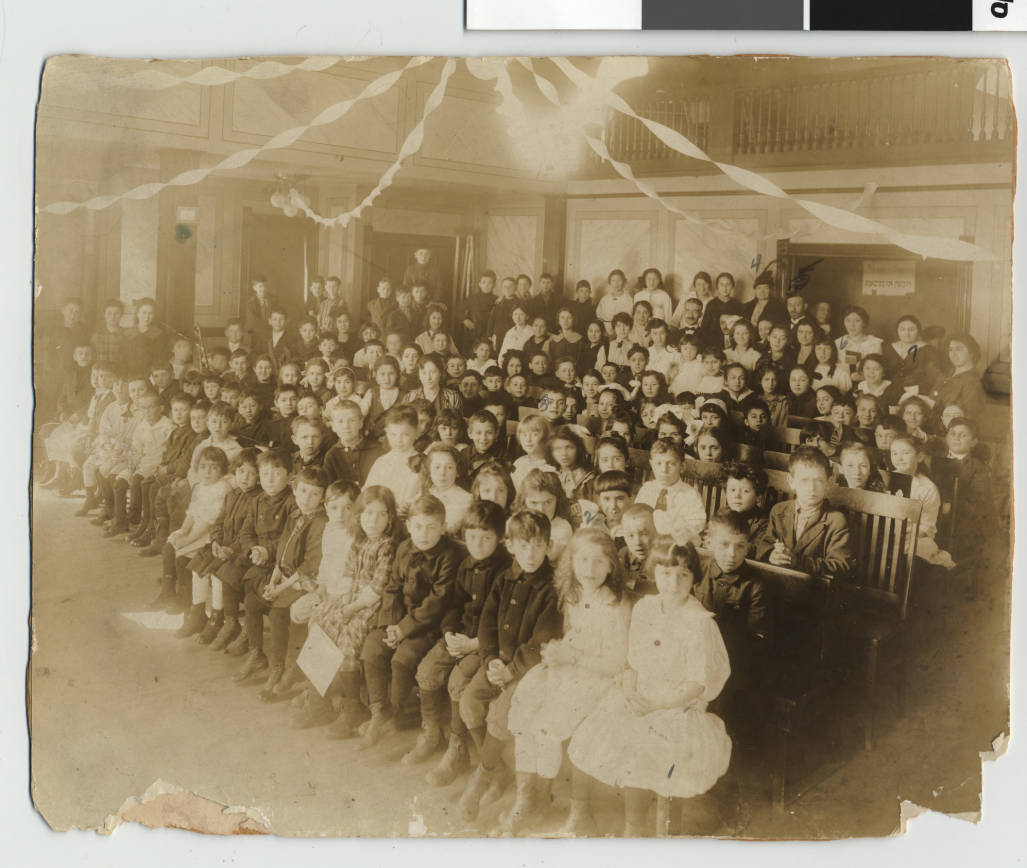
Talmud Torah at the Moses Montefiore Hebrew School in Duluth, Minnesota, U.S.

In the United States, the Machzikei Talmud Torah in New York City, an Ashkenazic Talmud Torah, was organized in 1883 by Israel (Isidor) Rosenthal. It maintained schools on its own premises at 225–227 East Broadway. It instructed over 1,100 boys at a yearly expense of about $12,000. On January 22, 1905, the society opened a branch at 67 East 7th street, to which Jacob H. Schiff donated $25,000. The society was managed by a board of directors and a committee of education. The studies comprised elementary Hebrew, the reading of Jewish prayers, the translation of the Torah into Yiddish and English, and the principles of Jewish faith and practices.

Girls in the United States at this time were often educated at public schools together with boys, and they received their Jewish education through programs at synagogues and Sunday schools, because Jewish day schools were less common. As a result, the "New World" Talmud Torah of the first half of the 20th century was provided in a co-educational environment. The time of study occupied only two hours per day, after public-school hours, as all pupils attended the city schools for secular education. There were several other Talmud Torahs in New York City, and similar institutions existed in other major cities of the United States and Canada with a large Jewish population.

== See also ==
- Association for Jewish Studies (U.S.)
- British Association for Jewish Studies
- Encyclopedia Judaica
- Encyclopedia Talmudit
- Hebrew Publishing Company
- Jewish Encyclopedia
- Jewish English Bible translations
- Jewish identity
  - Israelites
  - Jewish peoplehood
  - Return to Zion
  - Twelve Tribes of Israel
- Jewish Publication Society
- Karaite Judaism
- Koren Publishers Jerusalem
- Musar movement
- National Library of Israel
- Rabbinic literature
- Samaritan Pentateuch
- Sefaria
- Soncino Press
- Shorter Jewish Encyclopedia
- The New Jewish Encyclopedia
- The Jerusalem Kollel
- Torah database
