= New Jewish Publication Society of America Tanakh =

Modern Jewish translation of the Masoretic Text into English

The bilingual Hebrew–English edition of the New JPS translation

The New Jewish Publication Society of America Tanakh (abbreviated as NJPS), first published in complete form in 1985, is a modern Jewish 'written from scratch' translation of the Masoretic Text of the Hebrew Bible into English. It is based on revised editions of earlier publications of subdivisions of the Tanakh such as the Torah and Five Megillot which were originally published from 1969 to 1982. It is unrelated to the original JPS Tanakh translation, which was based on the Revised Version and American Standard Version but emended to more strictly follow the Masoretic Text, beyond both translations being published by the Jewish Publication Society of America.

This translation emerged from the collaborative efforts of an interdenominational team of Jewish scholars and rabbis working together over a thirty-year period. These translators based their translation on the Masoretic Hebrew text, and consistently strove for a faithful, idiomatic rendering of the original scriptural languages.

== History ==
The New Jewish Publication Society translation of the Hebrew Bible is the second translation published by the Jewish Publication Society (JPS), superseding its 1917 translation. It is a completely fresh translation into modern English, independent of the earlier translation or any other existing one. Current editions of this version refer to it as The Jewish Publication Society Tanakh Translation. Originally known by the abbreviation “NJV” (New Jewish Version), it is now styled as “NJPS.”

Tanakh, the new JPS translation

The translation follows the Hebrew or Masoretic Text scrupulously, taking a conservative approach regarding conjectural emendations: It avoids them completely for the Torah, but mentions them occasionally in footnotes for Nevi'im and Ketuvim. Attested variants from other ancient versions are also mentioned in footnotes, even for the Torah, in places where the editors thought they might shed light on difficult passages in the Masoretic Text.

The order of the books is as found in published Tanakhim, rather than that of common English Bibles. In particular, it follows the traditional Jewish division into Torah (the five books of Moses), Nevi'im (Prophets) and Ketuvim (Writings). Furthermore, the division into chapters follows the conventions established by printers of the Hebrew text, which occasionally differs from English Bibles. In the Psalms, for instance, the titles are often counted as the first verse, causing a difference of one in verse numbering for these Psalms with respect to other English Bibles.

The editor in chief of the Torah was Harry Orlinsky, who had been a translator of the Revised Standard Version and would become the only translator of that version to work also on the New Revised Standard Version. The other editors were E. A. Speiser and H. L. Ginsberg. Associated with them were three rabbis: Max Arzt, Bernard Jacob Bamberger, and Harry Freedman, representing the Conservative, Reform, and Orthodox branches of organized Jewish religious life. Solomon Grayzel, editor of the Jewish Publication Society, served as secretary of the committee. The Torah appeared in 1962, with a second edition in 1967.

The Five Megilloth (Five Scrolls) and Jonah appeared in 1969, the Book of Isaiah in 1973 and the Book of Jeremiah in 1974. Revised versions of Isaiah, Jeremiah and Jonah appeared in Nevi'im (1978), edited by Professor Ginsberg assisted by Professor Orlinsky.

A separate committee was set up in 1966 to translate Ketuvim. It consisted of Moshe Greenberg, Jonas Greenfield and Nahum Sarna. The Psalms appeared in 1973 and the Book of Job in 1980. Revised versions of both, and the Megilloth, appeared in the complete Ketuvim in 1982. The 1985 edition listed the Ketuvim translation team as also including Saul Leeman, Chaim Potok, Martin Rozenberg, and David Shapiro.

Since 2017, the bilingual Hebrew-English edition of the JPS Tanakh (1985 translation) has been digitalized and is available online on the website Sefaria.

== Revisions ==
- The first one-volume edition of the NJPS translation of the entire Hebrew Bible was published in 1985 under the title Tanakh. It incorporates a thorough revision of the translation's sections previously issued individually.
- A third edition of The Torah (the first section of the NJPS Tanakh) was published in 1992.
- A bilingual Hebrew-English edition of the full Hebrew Bible, in facing columns, was published in 1999. It includes the second edition of the NJPS Tanakh translation (which supersedes the 1992 Torah) and the Masoretic Hebrew text as found in the Leningrad Codex.
- The recent series of JPS Bible commentaries all use the NJPS translation.
- The Jewish Study Bible, published in 2003, contains the NJPS translation in one volume with introductions, notes, and supplementary material. Oxford University Press, ISBN 0-19-529754-7
- The Contemporary Torah: A Gender-Sensitive Adaptation of the JPS Translation, published in 2006, includes the Five Books of Moses and a supplementary “Dictionary of Gender in the Torah.” Its version of NJPS, which goes by the abbreviation CJPS, is “contemporary” in its use of gendered language only where germane, and in its drawing upon recent scholarship about gender roles in the ancient Near East. With regard to human beings, the CJPS adaptation sets out to represent the gender implications of the Torah's language as its composer(s) counted on the original audience to receive them, given the gender assumptions of that time and place. With regard to God, the CJPS adaptation employs gender-neutral language except where certain poetic passages invoke gendered imagery.
- The JPS TANAKH: Gender Sensitive Edition, also known as the Revised JPS Edition or RJPS, was released in 2023 in collaboration with Sefaria.

== Adoption by Jewish denominations ==
The NJPS is the basis of the translation used in the official Torah commentaries of both Reform Judaism and Conservative Judaism. Jews in Reconstructionist Judaism and the Chavurah movement also use both Reform and Conservative Torah commentaries, so the NJPS is effectively the primary translation for all forms of English-speaking Judaism outside of Orthodox Judaism. Orthodox Jews use a wider variety of translations, but many use the NJPS as well.

- The Torah: A Modern Commentary, the Humash published by the Reform Movement in 1974–1980, with a one-volume edition in 1981, includes the NJPS translation.

A revised edition of this work was issued in 2005, which includes a version of the NJPS translation for the books of Exodus through Deuteronomy, newly adapted for gender accuracy. (The translations of Genesis, and the prophetic books in this edition, come from a different source.)

- "Etz Hayim Humash," the Humash published by the Conservative Movement in 2001, incorporates the NJPS translation (with minor modifications).

All of these Jewish denominations use their respective Torah commentaries non-exclusively. Within their synagogue libraries, and in use in their adult education classes, one also may find a wide variety of other Torah commentaries, including many from Orthodox Jewish authors and editors.

== Usage ==
- The JPS Torah Translation and excerpts from Prophets is used in The Torah: A Modern Commentary, the Commentary of the Reform Movement.
- The JPS Torah Translation, excerpts from Prophets, and an edited version of its 5-volume Torah and 1-volume Haftorah Commentaries are used in the Etz Hayim, the Commentary of the Conservative Movement.
- The JPS TANAKH Translation is used in the Oxford University Press Jewish Study Bible.
- The JPS TANAKH has been selected as the official Bible for the International Bible Contest.
- The JPS TANAKH has been selected as the official Jewish version to be used in its “Bible as Literature” curriculum for American public schools as well as its Jewish Bible website.
- The JPS TANAKH was selected by Quality Paperback Book Club for its “Old Testament” edition in its 5-volume Sacred Writings Series.
- The JPS Torah is held in the House of Commons Library and can be used for the Oath of Allegiance in the United Kingdom.

== See also ==
- Dead Sea Scrolls
- Encyclopedia Judaica
- Encyclopedia Talmudit
- Hebrew Publishing Company
- Jewish Encyclopedia
- Jewish English Bible translations
- Judaica Press
- Sefaria
- Torah database
