= Judaica Press =

American independent publishing house

- Founded: 1963
- Founder: S. Goldman
- Successor: Jack Goldman
- Country of origin: United States
- Headquarters location: New York City
- Publication types: Scholarly works
- Nonfiction topics: Hebrew Bible, Jewish literature, Jewish studies, Talmud
- Official website: www.judaicapress.com

Judaica Press is an American independent publishing house founded in New York City by S. Goldman in 1963, and then taken over by his son Jack Goldman in response to the growing demand for scholarly works covering the academic field of Jewish studies in the English-speaking Jewish diaspora.

In addition to publishing the Mikraoth Gedoloth Nach (Prophets and Writings of the Hebrew Bible) series, Goldman acquired the rights to some of the major works of Jewish scholarship at the time: the Blackman Mishnayoth set, the Hirsch Chumash set, and the comprehensive Dictionary of the Targumim, Talmud Bavli, Talmud Yerushlami, and Midrashic Literature (1886–1903) written by the Orthodox Jewish rabbi and Talmudic scholar Marcus Jastrow.

== See also ==
- Association for Jewish Studies (U.S.)
- British Association for Jewish Studies
- Dead Sea Scrolls
- Encyclopedia Judaica
- Encyclopedia Talmudit
- Hebrew Publishing Company
- Jewish Encyclopedia
- Jewish English Bible translations
- Jewish Publication Society
- Koren Publishers Jerusalem
- National Library of Israel
- Rabbinic literature
- Sefaria
- Shorter Jewish Encyclopedia
- The New Jewish Encyclopedia
- Torah database
