= Jewish Publication Society =

American non-profit, non-denominational scholarly publisher

- Founded: 1888
- Country of origin: United States
- Headquarters location: Philadelphia, Pennsylvania, U.S.
- Publication types: Scholarly works
- Nonfiction topics: Hebrew Bible, Jewish literature, Jewish studies, Judaica, Religious studies
- Official website: jps.org

The Jewish Publication Society (abbreviated as JPS), originally known as the Jewish Publication Society of America, is an American non-profit, non-denominational publisher of scholarly works covering the academic field of Jewish studies. Founded in Philadelphia, Pennsylvania in 1888 by Reform Rabbi Joseph Krauskopf and lay leaders of the Jewish–American communities, JPS is especially well known for its English translation of the Hebrew Bible, the JPS Tanakh. Since 2012, JPS publications have been distributed by the University of Nebraska Press.

As a nonprofit publisher, the Jewish Publication Society develops projects that for-profit publishers will not invest in, significant projects that may take years to complete. Other core JPS projects include the ongoing JPS Bible commentary series; books on Jewish tradition, holidays, and minhagim; the history of Judaism; Jewish theology, ethics, and philosophy; midrashim and rabbinic literature; and its many Bible editions and Bible study resources.

== History ==
The first Jewish Publication Society was founded in 1845 in Philadelphia, Pennsylvania in the United States, but was dissolved six years later after a fire destroyed the building and the entire JPS stock. A second, founded in New York in 1873, ended in 1875.

In response to the growing need for English-language translation of Jewish texts, rabbis and lay leaders of the Jewish–American communities met on June 3, 1888 at a national convention in Philadelphia and refounded the Jewish Publication Society. As JPS moved into the 20th century, membership grew rapidly. After years of meetings, deliberations, and revisions, the entire JPS translation of the Hebrew Bible was finally completed in 1917. This crowning achievement was put to use at the American entry into World War I, when young Jewish–American men drafted into the U.S. Army were given prayer books and readings from the Tanakh as they marched off to war.

As Adolf Hitler and the Nazi Party (NSDAP) rose to power in Weimar Germany during the early 1930s, American Jews resisted anti-Semitism through the power of words. Works such as The Decay of Czarism and Legends of the Jews became staples of Jewish literacy and helped to preserve the legacy of European Jewry. JPS also assisted the war effort by supporting the employment and resettlement of Jewish refugees from Nazi-occupied Europe in the United States, and by printing pamphlets that were dropped behind enemy lines, at the request of the U.S. federal government.

During the latter half of the 20th century, JPS published a revised English translation of the Hebrew Bible, books detailing both war atrocities and triumphs, and books with a new-found focus on the State of Israel. Works such as The JPS Commentary Series, The Jewish Catalog, and The K'Tonton Series were tremendously successful. From 1975 to 1978, A. Leo Levin was its President. In 1985, the newly translated three parts of the Hebrew Bible (the Pentateuch, Prophets, Psalms, and Writings) were finally compiled into what is now known as the New JPS Tanakh (NJPS, or New JPS translation, to distinguish it from the OJPS, or Old JPS translation of 1917).

In September 2011, JPS entered into a new collaborative publishing arrangement with the University of Nebraska Press, under which the University of Nebraska purchased all of JPS's outstanding book inventory, and is responsible for the production, distribution, and marketing of all JPS publications, effective January 1, 2012, while JPS headquarters remained in Philadelphia.

== Leadership ==
JPS is governed by a Board of Trustees, headed by its Board President Gittel Hilibrand. Past editors-in-chief include Henrietta Szold (1893–1916), Solomon Grayzel (1939–1966), and Chaim Potok (1966–1974). Potok was involved in JPS's publication activities for 35 years, serving as editor for 8 years, secretary of the Bible translation committee for the Ketuvim ("Writings") for 16 years, chair of the JPS Editorial Committee for 18 years, and literary editor to its Bible program for 18 years.

Ellen Frankel was editor-in-chief (and later also CEO) from 1991 until October 2009. She is now Editor Emerita of the Society. Carol Hupping was managing editor (and for some years publishing director) from 1991 until her retirement in March, 2016. Joy Weinberg succeeded her as managing editor in April 2016.

Rabbi Barry L. Schwartz became the CEO in 2010, when he came to JPS from Congregation M'Kor Shalom in Cherry Hill, New Jersey, where he had served as senior rabbi for 11 years. Rabbi Schwartz served on the board of several nonprofit organizations, and is especially active in environmental work.

== Notable publications ==
- The JPS Torah Commentaries (Genesis, Exodus, Leviticus, Numbers, Deuteronomy)
- The JPS Bible Commentaries (Ecclesiastes, Esther, Haftarot, Jonah, Ruth, Song of Songs)
- Outside the Bible: Ancient Jewish Writings Related to Scripture, Louis H. Feldman, James L. Kugel and Lawrence Schiffman
- The JPS Commentary on the Haggadah, Joseph Tabory
- Dictionary of Jewish Words, Joyce Eisenberg and Ellen Scolnic
- The Jewish Bible, The Jewish Publication Society
- Celebrating the Jewish Year in 3 volumes, Paul Steinberg, Janet Greenstein Potter
- The Commentators' Bible (Exodus, Leviticus, Numbers, Deuteronomy, and Genesis in 2018), Michael Carasik
- JPS Illustrated Children's Bible, Ellen Frankel
- Chanting the Hebrew Bible, Josh Jacobson
- Jewish Publication Society Series
- Who Are the Jews - And Who Can We Become?
- JEWels: Teasing Out the Poetry in Jewish Humor and Storytelling

== Awards ==
=== National Jewish Book Awards (since 2000) ===
2000:

- Synagogues without Jews, Ben-Zion and Rivka

2001:

- Forged in Freedom, Norman H. Finkelstein
- The Rebbe’s Daughter, Nehemiah Polen
- Etz Hayim, ed. David Lieber

2003:

- To Do the Right and the Good, Elliot Dorff

2006:

- Folktales of the Jews: Tales from the Sephardic Dispersion, Dan Ben-Amos
- Lilith’s Ark: Teenage Tales of Biblical Women, Deborah Cohen

2007:

- Inventing Jewish Ritual, Vanessa Ochs
- The Power of Song and Other Sephardic Tales, Rita Roth

2009:

- JPS Illustrated Children’s Bible, Ellen Frankel, Illustrated by Avi Katz
- Celebrating the Jewish Year: The Spring and Summer Holidays: Passover, the Omer, Shavuot, Tisha B’Av, Paul Steinberg, Janet Greenstein Potter, Editor
- Subversive Sequels in the Bible, Judy Klitsner

2011:

- The JPS Bible Commentary: Ruth, Tamara Cohn Eskenazi and Tikva Frymer-Kensky

2014:

- Outside the Bible: Ancient Jewish Writings Related to Scripture, Louis Feldman, James Kugel, and Lawrence Schiffman

=== Children's Book Awards ===
- Terrible Things: An Allegory of the Holocaust, Eve Bunting (A Notable Children's Book in the Field of Social Studies)
- The Jewish Kids Catalog, Chaya Burstein (National Jewish Book Award)
- The Castle on Hester Street, Linda Heller (Parents’ Choice Award)
- In the Mouth of the Wolf, Rose Zar (Association of Jewish Librarians Best Book Award)
- The Power of Song and Other Sephardic Tales, Rita Roth (National Jewish Book Award)
- Anne Frank: A Life in Hiding, Johanna Hurwitz (Nominated for the Texas Blue Bonnet Award: A Notable Children's Trade Book in the Field of Social Studies)
- Haym Salomon: Liberty’s Son, Shirley Milgrim (National Jewish Book Award)
- Mrs. Moskowitz and the Sabbath Candlesticks, Amy Schwartz (National Jewish Book Award and Association of Jewish Librarians Best Book Award)
- Clara’s Story, Clara Isaacman (Sydney Taylor Honor Book)
- Lilith’s Ark, Deborah Bodin Cohen (Sydney Taylor Notable Book for Teens)
- Of Heroes, Hooks and Heirlooms, Faye Silton (Winner of Sydney Taylor Manuscript Competition)
- A Coat for the Moon and Other Jewish Tales, Howard Schwartz (Anne Izard Storytellers' Choice Award and Storytelling World Magazine Award)
- David and Max, Gary Provost and Gail Levine-Provost (Notable Children's Book in the Field of Social Studies, Skipping Stones Honor Award)
- Potato Pancakes All Around, Marilyn Hirsch (Children's Choice Award)
- JPS Illustrated Children’s Bible, Ellen Frankel(National Jewish Book Award and Taylor Book Award Notable Book for Readers of All Ages)
- Naomi’s Song, Selma Kritzer Silverberg (Sydney Taylor Book Award Honor for Books for Teen Readers)
- Elvina’s Mirror, Sylvie Weil (Sydney Taylor Book Award Notable Book for Older Readers)

=== Other awards ===
2008:

- Skipping Stones Honor Award--A Shout in the Sunshine, Mara Cohen Ioannides

2009:

- Sophie Brody Medal--From Krakow to Krypton: Jews and Comic Books, Arie Kaplan
- Booklist Editors' Choice: Books for Youth Winner--From Krakow to Krypton: Jews and Comic Books, Arie Kaplan

== See also ==
- Association for Jewish Studies (U.S.)
- British Association for Jewish Studies
- Dead Sea Scrolls
- Encyclopedia Judaica
- Encyclopedia Talmudit
- Hebrew Publishing Company
- Jewish Encyclopedia
- Jewish English Bible translations
- Judaica Press
- Koren Publishers Jerusalem
- National Library of Israel
- Rabbinic literature
- Sefaria
- Shorter Jewish Encyclopedia
- The New Jewish Encyclopedia
- Torah database
