= Torah database =

Electronic collection of classic Jewish texts

A Torah database (Hebrew: מאגר תורני) is a collection of Jewish religious texts in electronic form, the kinds of texts which, especially in Israel, are often called "The Traditional Jewish Bookshelf" (Hebrew: ארון הספרים היהודי); the texts are in their original languages (Hebrew or Aramaic). It usually refers to a collection of primary texts, rather than translations or secondary research and reference materials.

These databases contain either keyed-in digital texts or a collection of page-images from printed editions. Given the nature of Torah study in Judaism, which involves extensive citation and cross-referencing among hundreds of texts written over the course of thousands of years, many Torah databases also make extensive use of hypertext links.

== Digital Text Software Packages ==
=== The Bar-Ilan Responsa Project ===
The very first such database was the Bar Ilan Responsa Project, which began in 1963 at the Weizmann Institute in Israel, migrated to Bar-Ilan University soon thereafter, and was up and running by 1967. It became available in time-sharing mode from university terminals in 1979, was transferred to CD-ROM in 1990 and in the mid 2000s to flash drive, and version 1.0 was offered for sale to the public in 1992. The current version is number 32 or 32+ (the "plus" version contains an important secondary reference work, the Encyclopedia Talmudit).

The Responsa Project tries to base its electronic texts on the most accurate printed editions (though it seems that it is sometimes prevented from doing so because of copyright considerations), and it has a reputation for relatively error-free electronic texts based upon those editions. It also features approximately 360,000 hypertext links between the various collections within the database, as well as a topical halakhic index for the Shulchan Aruch and selected responsa. Since its early years it has employed a sophisticated search-engine specifically designed for Hebrew language texts.

In recent years (at least since version 10 in 2002), the Responsa Project has made updates available once a year, usually between the Passover and Shavuot holidays, although this varies considerably. Sometimes they release an update after the holiday of Chanukah or after the holiday of Purim. It depends on how much they have completed.

In January, 2007, the responsa project became available in an online edition. In April, 2007 the Responsa Project won the Israel Prize for Jewish studies.

Currently (as of 2024, version 32+) according to their list the number of seforim listed is over 1,000 (excluding the Chazon Ish which is only available for searching). The Kabbalah section includes only the Zohar, and a few works listed under Otzar HaMidrashim. However, the other sections contain many essential and important seforim.

=== DBS Master Library ===
DBS rivals the Bar-Ilan Responsa project in size. It has less in the overall area of Halakha and fewer responsa, but rivals Bar Ilan's Reponsa project in: Jewish philosophy and Mussar. To date, the latest Bar Ilan and the latest DBS versions are comparable mostly, in terms of number of texts in these areas. Bar Ilan surpasses DBS in the commentaries on Talmud Bavli, the reponsa, commentaries on the Mishneh Torah, etc. DBS surpasses Bar Ilan in the area of Hasidut and Kabbalah. In recent years, Bar Ilan has included a great number of texts that considered to be mostly accurate, and mostly error free and has become the gold standard of any Torah database. DBS has lagged behind, although its Kabbalah section is fantastic, it is not clear which texts were used as well as their accuracy and whether the text presented is accurate.

DBS contains a good number of Hebrew texts with vowels (niqqud); see below. Criticisms: It does not have extensive hypertext links between its various large collections, the texts are considered to be inaccurate and may have some errors in them. It is not as comprehensive in many areas, compared with Bar Ilan.

=== Soncino Classics Collection ===
Produced by Davka corporation, Soncino Classics Collection includes

1. Soncino English translations of the Tanach, Babylonian Talmud, Midrash Rabbah, and Zohar;
2. Hebrew and Aramaic texts of the Tanach, Babylonian Talmud, Midrash Rabbah and Zohar, as well as Rashi's commentary on Talmud.

Soncino Classics Collection is a commercial software.

=== The Torah Bookshelf ("Halamish") ===
Otzar ha-Poskim (also see below) produces "The Torah Bookshelf," a large digital collection of basic texts called "Halamish" (Ha-Sifriyah ha-Toranit) in Hebrew, currently in version 3.0.

=== Ariel ===
Ariel (currently version 2.1) uses the same software as Otzar ha-Poskim's "Torah Bookshelf" and is similar to it in scope (a large basic collection), but many of the titles in the two collections are not the same.

=== Mikra'ot Gedolot Haketer ===
Bar-Ilan University's project to produce an entirely new critical edition of the Mikra'ot Gedolot is also being made available in electronic form in addition to the printed volumes, The project contains four main elements:

- The biblical text (based on the Aleppo Codex and a careful reconstruction of its missing parts) is keyed-in, including vowels and cantillation signs, allowing for sophisticated research on details of grammar.
- The masorah is also keyed in (also based on the Aleppo Codex and supplemented by a special commentary).
- The Targum is included with vowels, based on manuscripts of the Yemenite Taj.
- The biblical commentaries are also keyed-in as fresh new editions based on manuscripts.

The CD-ROM is currently in version 2.0 (beta).

(Note: Although also under the auspices of Bar-Ilan University, this project is unrelated to the Bar-Ilan Responsa Project.)

=== Digital Hebrew Texts with Vowels (Niqqud) ===
==== Tanakh ====
Tanakh is available as a keyed-in digital Hebrew text with vowels (niqqud) in all of the above software packages.

Tanakh with both vowels and cantillation signs is available in the Mikra'ot Gedolot Haketer package and as online freeware from Mechon Mamre, Hebrew Wikisource and Base HaSefer (see the latter three below). All of these versions are based on the Aleppo Codex, but Mechon Mamre's edition is based on the editing method of Rabbi Mordecai Breuer, which differs slightly from the Mikra'ot Gedolot Haketer edition in some small details. Hebrew Wikisource is similar to both of these versions (see a full description) and the text at Base HaSefer is based on that of Hebrew Wikisource.

==== Targum ====
Both Targum Onkelos on the Torah and Targum Jonathan on Nevi'im are vowelized (based on Yemenite manuscripts) in the digital texts of Mikra'ot Gedolot Haketer. Targum Onkelos is vowelized in the Judaic Bookshelf package and as online freeware from Mechon Mamre, Hebrew Wikisource, Al Hatorah and Base HaSefer; most of these edition are taken from the first edition of the Taj.

==== Mishnah ====
The Mishnah is included as a keyed-in digital Hebrew text with vowels in all of the general software packages above. The vowels in the "Halamish" package seem to be based upon the Albeck edition of the Mishnah (see Mishnah).

==== Siddur and liturgy ====
Siddur: Digital siddurim with vowels (according to various customs) are included in DBS (Ashkenaz, Sefard, Sefaradi/Edot Mizrah), Judaic Bookshelf (Ashkenaz, Sefard), and Ariel (Ashkenaz, Sefard, Sefaradi/Edot Mizrah). The latest version of DBS (version 10) also includes mahzorim, selihot, and the Passover haggadah.

Al Hatorah includes a siddur and a haggadah with many commentaries, but it is less useful as a siddur to use for prayers.

==== Popular ethical works (musar) ====
Popular ethical works are normally vowelized in published editions. DBS's collection of such works includes vowels in the electronic editions.

==== Popular halakhic works ====
Some of these are also vowelized in DBS.

== Page-Image software packages ==
=== Otzar HaHochma ===
This project is based on page-images of 128,200 scanned Jewish books. It is possible to add additional libraries (Mosad Harav Kook, Machon Yerushalayim Publications, Ahavat Shalom Publishers, and Kehot Publication Society). Additionally, the user can find books by topic. The system has features which turns it to a learning tool.

=== Otzar ha-Shut ===
Otzar ha-Poskim produces "Otzar ha-Shut" (hyperlinked images of individual responsa indexed according to the order of the Shulhan Arukh). This package also includes "Halamish" (see above).

=== The Steinzaltz Talmud on CD-ROM ===
The Steinsaltz Talmud is available as searchable PDF images on CD-ROM. All material from the printed edition is included, but it can be copied and pasted only as images and not as digital text.

== Wikimedia Torah study projects ==
Text study projects at Wikisource allow contributors to help build free content Torah databases at Wikimedia through volunteer typing and editing. Please note that in most instances, these projects proceed much faster in Hebrew than in English.

- Mikraot Gedolot (Rabbinic Bible) in Hebrew (sample) and English (sample).
- Cantillation at the "Vayavinu Bamikra" Project in Hebrew (lists nearly 200 recordings) and English.
- Mishnah in Hebrew and English (sample).
- Shulchan Aruch in Hebrew and English (Hebrew text with English translation).
- Aruch HaShulchan is available in a newly formatted, digital Hebrew version at Hebrew Wikisource (over 600 chapters are currently available). See also Orach Chaim index.

== Free Torah libraries ==
There are also some online projects that make either digital texts, or public domain images of old books, available to the public for free:

- Al Hatorah - This started as a database for Bible and commentaries, but it has now been expanded to include Talmud, Shulchan Aruch, the siddur, and several works on Jewish thought, all presented with commentaries.
- Base Hasefer – enables search and analysis of Sifrei Kodesh as if the content implicitly forms a relational database. It contains the full text of the Tanach and Targum Onkelos. It can search for vowels, cantillation marks, word roots, anagrams, regular expressions, gematria and word positions with an unlimited use of wildcard characters. Analysis tools include: original Hebrew text viewed with parallel columns including Targum and other related content; a powerful lexicon; an interactive parse-tree of verses broken down by cantillation rules; tag-clouds for viewing frequencies; a tool for comparing and analyzing two different selections of Tanach.
- Genizah – Textual variants of every page of Talmud Bavli
- Hebrew Wikisource – thousands of Torah texts in a digital library that is continually being expanded and improved by volunteers
- HebrewBooks.org – was founded to preserve old American Hebrew books that are out of print or circulation, but it expanded its mission "to include all Torah Seforim (=books) ever printed". Over 60,000 out-of-print books and journals may be downloaded as PDF images on the main site and on its beta version. Additionally, there are also many copyrighted works that have been submitted by the original authors or their families for inclusion within this website. They have begun to work on OCRing the scans and making the full-text searchable.
- Jewish Books Collaborative Archive (אוצר הספרים היהודי השיתופי) – a volunteer-based MediaWiki platform launched in 2018 for collaborative editing of Torah literature. Features typed texts with vowelization, including biblical commentaries, halakhic works, and Talmudic commentaries. As of 2025, contains over 210,000 pages with content available under CC-BY-NC-SA license.
- Mechon Mamre – provides free access to Tanakh, Mishnah, Tosefta, Jerusalem Talmud, Babylonian Talmud, Mishneh Torah of Maimonides
- Sefaria – includes interactive bilingual texts collected from public sources or created by volunteer translators
- Sages of Ashkenaz – provides various Ashkenazi seforim, site no longer up As of 2024
- Seforim Online – provides PDF images of several hundred classic rabbinic texts; all are in the public domain
- Sifrei Kodesh Search – Firefox add-on for searching texts
- The Daat Library – variety of primary texts, including many of R' Yosef Qafih's ("Kapach") and other more critical editions

== See also ==
- Association for Jewish Studies (U.S.)
- British Association for Jewish Studies
- Dead Sea Scrolls
- Encyclopedia Judaica
- Encyclopedia Talmudit
- Hebrew Publishing Company
- Jewish Encyclopedia
- Jewish English Bible translations
- Jewish Publication Society
- Koren Publishers Jerusalem
- Mir Yeshiva in Jerusalem
- National Library of Israel
- Rabbinic literature
- Samaritan Pentateuch
- Sefaria
- Soncino Press
- Shorter Jewish Encyclopedia
- The New Jewish Encyclopedia
- The Jerusalem Kollel
