= Geoffrey Wigoder =

British-Israeli scholar, writer and broadcaster (1922–1999)

- Born: 3 August 1922; Leeds, England
- Died: 9 April 1999 (aged 76); Jerusalem, Israel
- Occupations: Scholar, editor, broadcaster
- Spouse: Devorah Mac Dwyer
- Children: 2

Geoffrey Wigoder (3 August 1922 – 9 April 1999) was a British-born Israeli scholar, editor, and broadcaster, best known as editor-in-chief of the Encyclopaedia Judaica.

== Early life ==
Wigoder was born in Leeds, England, into a family with both acting and rabbinic connections. He studied at Trinity College Dublin, earning a degree in medieval Jewish history, and later completed doctoral work at the University of Oxford in Jewish philosophy. He also trained for the rabbinate at the Jewish Theological Seminary of America in New York City, where he met his future wife. The couple married and emigrated in 1949 to the newly established State of Israel, settling in Jerusalem.

== Career ==
In 1950, Wigoder became English-language director of The Voice of Zion to the Diaspora, an Israeli international broadcasting service. He later served as a correspondent in Jerusalem for the BBC and The Yorkshire Post, reporting on major events including the Eichmann trial. From 1960 to 1967 he directed Israel’s overseas broadcasts.

Wigoder collaborated with Cecil Roth on the New Standard Jewish Encyclopedia and succeeded him as editor-in-chief of the 16-volume Encyclopaedia Judaica following Roth's death in 1970. He later oversaw the encyclopedia's digital release on CD-ROM. His other editorial works include The Encyclopedia of the Jewish Religion, Jewish Art and Civilization, The Story of the Synagogue, Dictionary of the Jewish–Christian Dialogue, Dictionary of Jewish biography, Jewish-Christian relations since the Second World War, Jewish-Christian interfaith relations : agendas for tomorrow, The Crown of wisdom : sixty years of the Hebrew University of Jerusalem, and The Vatican-Israel agreement : a watershed in Christian-Jewish relations.

At the Hebrew University of Jerusalem, Wigoder founded Israel’s first oral history department and contributed to the establishment of the Museum of the Jewish Diaspora in Tel Aviv.

== Later life and death ==
Wigoder continued teaching and writing into the 1990s, editing works such as the New Encyclopedia of Zionism and Israel. He died in Jerusalem on 9 April 1999, aged 76, from a brain hemorrhage following a fall. He was survived by his wife, two sons, a sister, and two grandchildren.
