= Sefaria =

Free-content digital library of Jewish texts

- Available in: English, Hebrew, Yiddish
- Founders: Brett Lockspeiser, Joshua Foer
- CEO: Daniel Septimus
- Website: www.sefaria.org
- Commercial: No
- Launched: 2011
- Current status: Active

Sefaria is an online open source, free content, digital library of Jewish scriptural, theological, philosophical, legal, mystical, historical, and ethical texts. It was founded in 2011 by former Google project manager Brett Lockspeiser and journalist-author Joshua Foer. Promoted as a "living library of Jewish texts", Sefaria relies partially upon volunteers to add texts and translations. The site provides cross-references and interconnections between various texts. Hebrew, Aramaic, and Judeo-Arabic texts are provided under a free license in the original and in translation if available. The website also provides a tool for creating source sheets.

Sefaria is maintained by an eponymous non-profit organization, which employs 18 engineers. According to its chief data officer, Lev Israel, in 2019, the service received 250,000 unique visitors monthly. The average monthly number of users increased to 775,000 in 2024, according to the year's impact report, with users from 234 countries.

== Etymology ==
The name Sefaria derives from the words sefer, or "book", and sifria ("library") in Hebrew.

== History ==
Sefaria was originally founded in 2011 by journalist Joshua Foer and Brett Lockspeiser, a former product manager at Google. The site's first beta was released in 2012. The company was formally incorporated in 2013, with funding from the Natan Fund, Jonathan and Tamar Koschitzky, and the Jim Joseph Foundation. By 2015, twelve apps used Sefaria's API and database. Also in 2015, Sefaria reached a deal to use Urim Publications' translations of the Tanakh and commentaries.

Sefaria's website received a major redesign in 2016, alongside the release of new apps for smartphones running iOS and Android, and a complete English translation of Rashi's commentary on the Torah. By this point, over a dozen people were part of the website's staff. Sefaria reached a major milestone in 2017, with the release of the William Davidson Talmud. In 2020, the site announced a pilot program to introduce its model to some secular works such as American constitutional studies.

Lockspeiser was recognized by Forward Magazine's 2019 Forward 50 list for his role in creating Sefaria.

== Operations ==
The company is a 501(c)(3) Public Charity; in 2024 it reported $4,529,089 in total revenue and total assets of $7,563,741.

== Content ==
Sefaria offers a library of Jewish texts, including Tanakh, Talmud, and Jewish prayers alongside sources in philosophy, mysticism, Jewish law, and newer works. Sefaria's content comes from a variety of sources. Books in the public domain are scanned and processed using optical character recognition software, which a team then corrects and formats. Other online sources such as On Your Way are also used. Some publishers have also provided works directly to Sefaria.

Sefaria also produces visualizations of the texts in its corpus, such as illustrating connections between the Tanakh and Talmud.

=== Translations ===
In 2021, Sefaria announced a major addition of a complete translation of Ibn Ezra's Torah commentaries provided by H. Norman Strickman and Arthur M. Silver, one of the only resources to have a complete translation of these works in English. A new English translation of the Tanakh was made available in 2022 by Sefaria in collaboration with Jewish Publication Society. This version translated gender idiomatically, rather than literally, and notably referred to God in a gender-neutral manner. The addition of this translation received some criticism from some Orthodox Jewish users, with Orthodox rabbis calling to stop using Sefaria completely, although there is continued availability of translations from Orthodox-oriented publishing houses.

== Features ==
=== Links ===
Many works are linked with their respective commentaries. For example, clicking on a verse in Tanakh will open a window on the side, allowing the user to open a commentary on that verse.

=== Source Sheets ===
Sefaria's Source Sheet Builder allows users to create a page with source text from Sefaria. Source Sheets may be published online, within Sefaria's ecosystem, and they may also be downloaded as PDF files, which are easy to print.

== See also ==
- Association for Jewish Studies (U.S.)
- British Association for Jewish Studies
- Dead Sea Scrolls
- Encyclopedia Judaica
- Encyclopedia Talmudit
- Hebrew Publishing Company
- Jewish Encyclopedia
- Jewish English Bible translations
- Jewish Publication Society
- Judaica Press
- Koren Publishers Jerusalem
- National Library of Israel
- Posen Library of Jewish Culture and Civilization
- Rabbinic literature
- Shorter Jewish Encyclopedia
- The New Jewish Encyclopedia
- Torah database
