= JEWels: Teasing Out the Poetry in Jewish Humor and Storytelling =

Poetry collection

- Editor: Steve Zeitlin
- Publisher: Jewish Publication Society
- Publication date: 2023
- Pages: 320

JEWels: Teasing Out the Poetry in Jewish Humor and Storytelling is a 2023 poetry collection published by the Jewish Publication Society and edited by Steve Zeitlin. The book also features commentary by Peninnah Schram.

== Format ==
JEWels is a collection of 179 Jewish stories and jokes. Zeitlin presents Jews as "cultural, religious, and historical travelers," whose own experiences and stories influence encounters with others. The book is broken into ten sections, each centered around a theme, these being: stories, traveling, jokes, life in Eastern Europe, Torah, The Holocaust, Jewish-American life, food, relationship to God, and the meaning of life. Most of the poems have additional commentary, discussing elements such as historical background and literary style. It concludes with a list of discussion questions.

The collection draws from a variety of sources, from 18th-century Hasidic rabbis the Baal Shem Tov and Rabbi Nachman of Breslov to 20th-century comedians (Lenny Bruce and Jackie Mason), writers (Elie Wiesel and Sholem Aleichem), and musicians (Itzhak Perlman), among others. The book largely focuses on Ashkenazi heritage and stories, something Zeitlin acknowledges within the text.

Zeitlin said the work combined his interest in Jewish storytelling with his passion for short poems, thus fulfilling a lifelong dream. He called Jews a “portable people,” traveling from place to place — either directed by God, or at times by humans. He endeavored to miniaturize Jewish stories and jokes into poems to make them more portable, so that readers could carry them.

== Critical reception ==
The collection received positive reviews from the Jewish Book Council, The Reporter, which appreciated the wisdom offered by the pieces, and the American Folklore Society, which recommended the book "to anyone interested in Jewish culture in general, and especially to those interested in its rich folklore".
