= Encyclopaedia Judaica =

English-language encyclopedia of the Jewish people and of Judaism

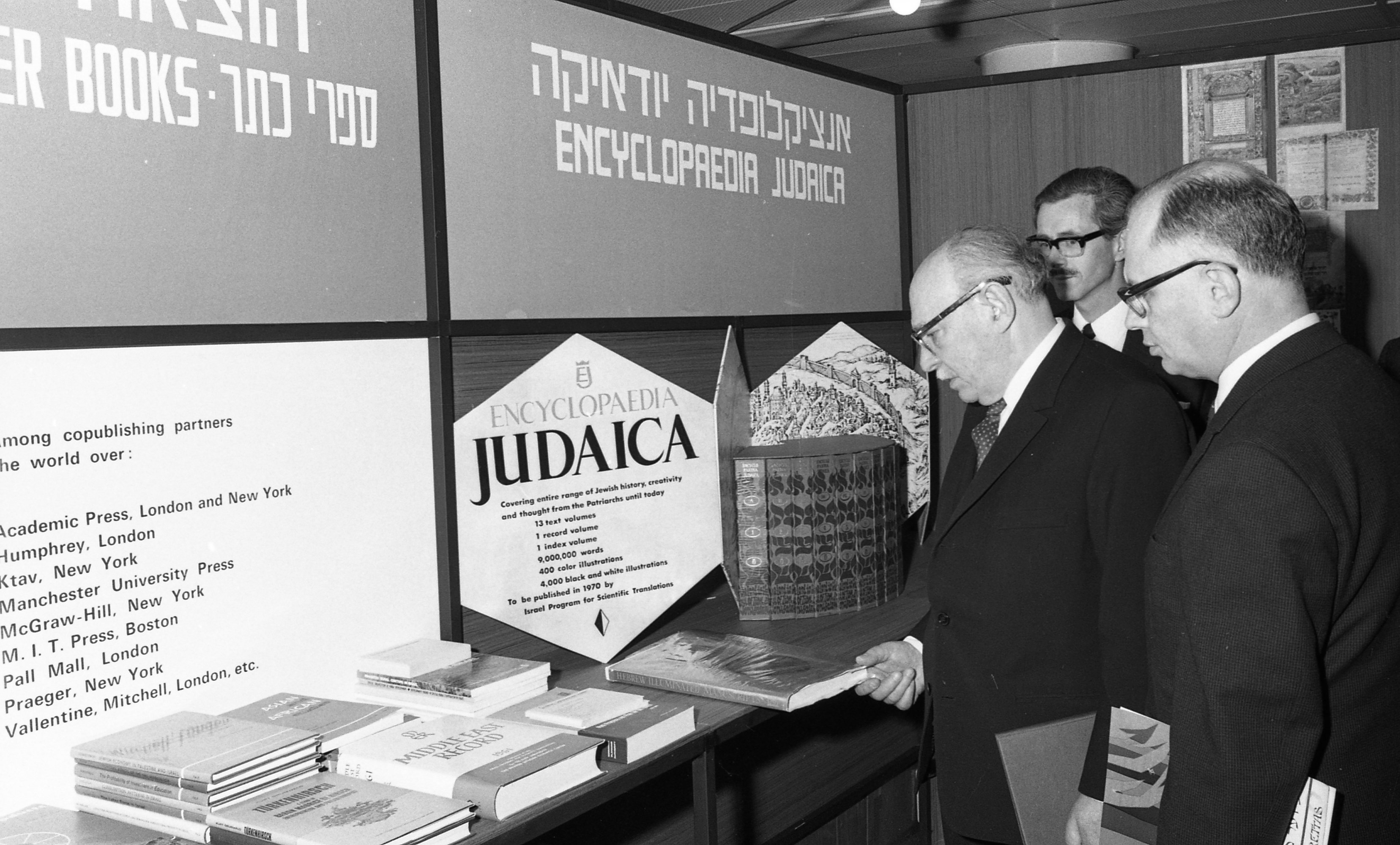
Encyclopaedia Judaica at Jerusalem International Book Fair (JIBF), 1969

The Encyclopaedia Judaica is a multi-volume English-language encyclopedia of the Jewish people, Judaism, and Israel. It covers diverse areas of the Jewish world and civilization, including Jewish history of all eras, culture, holidays, language, scripture, and religious teachings. First published in 1971–1972, by 2010 it had been published in two editions accompanied by a few revisions.

The Encyclopaedia Judaica was also published on CD-ROM. The CD-ROM version has been enhanced by at least 100,000 hyperlinks and several other features, including videos, slide shows, maps, music and Hebrew pronunciations. While the CD-ROM version is still available, the publisher has discontinued producing new copies for sale.

The encyclopedia was written by Israeli, American, and European professional subject specialists.

== History ==
=== Preceding attempts ===
Between 1901 and 1906 The Jewish Encyclopedia had been published in 12 volumes, and was heavily used as a source by the 16-volume Jewish Encyclopedia, published by Brockhaus and Efron in Saint Petersburg (1906–1913, in Russian). It was followed by the Jüdisches Lexikon I–II (1927–28, in German), Encyclopaedia Judaica I–II (1927–28) and Zsidó Lexikon (1929, edited by Újvári Péter, in Hungarian).

An unfinished German-language Encyclopaedia Judaica was published by Nahum Goldmann's Eshkol Publishing Society in Berlin 1928–1934. The chief editors were Jakob Klatzkin and Ismar Elbogen. Ten volumes from Aach to Lyra appeared before the project halted due to Nazi persecutions. Two Hebrew-language volumes A-Antipas, were also published under the title Eshkol (Hebrew: אשכול). A few of the articles from the German Judaica and even some of the reparations payments to Goldmann were used in making the English-language Judaica.

=== First edition ===
The English-language Encyclopaedia Judaica was first published from 1971 to 1972 in sixteen volumes, in Jerusalem by Keter Publishing House, and in New York City by the Macmillan Company. Between 1973 and 1991 eight "Year Books" were published (dated 1973, 1974, 1975–76, 1977–78, 1983–85, 1986–87, 1988–89, and 1990–91) along with two "Decennial" volumes dated 1973–1982 (also published as "Volume 17") and 1983–1992. Together these volumes contained more than 15 million words in over 25,000 articles.

Its general editors were, successively, Cecil Roth and Geoffrey Wigoder. Advertisers describe it as the result of about three decades of study and research by about 2,200 contributors and 250 editors around the world. Contributors included Gershom Scholem.

A Shorter Jewish Encyclopedia in Russian, launched in the early 1970s as an abridged translation of the Encyclopaedia Judaica, evolved into a largely independent publication that by late 2005 included eleven volumes and three supplements. A number of editions of a version of the English Encyclopaedia for youth were also published.

Because of its comprehensive scope, authority, and widespread availability, the Encyclopaedia Judaica has been recommended by the Library of Congress and by the Association of Jewish Libraries for use in determining the authoritative romanization of names of Jewish authors. Its guidelines for transliterating Hebrew into English are followed by many academic books and journals.

The first edition generated both positive and negative reviews.

The word Judaica is commonly used to refer to objects of Jewish art and Jewish ceremonial objects.

=== Second edition ===
In July 2003, Thomson Gale announced that it had acquired the rights to publish a second edition of Encyclopaedia Judaica, expecting to publish in December 2006 under one of its imprints, Macmillan Reference US. The 22-volume work was published on December 30, 2006 and released in January 2007.

Together with original publishers Keter Publishing House, Gale made major updates to many sections of Encyclopaedia Judaica for the new edition, including the entries on the Holocaust, American Jewry, Israel.

Fred Skolnik, who served as a co-editor on the original edition of Judaica, was retained as Editor-in-Chief for the second edition. American Holocaust scholar Michael Berenbaum, adjunct professor of theology at the American Jewish University as well as director of its Sigi Ziering Institute: Exploring the Ethical and Religious Implications of the Holocaust, serves as the editor for the Holocaust and Americana sections of the encyclopedia and executive editor for the work at large. Judith Baskin, University of Oregon Judaic Studies department head, was brought on to supervise improvement of women's studies and gender issues coverage. In total, more than 50 divisional editors, including five winners of the Israel Prize, oversaw contributions from nearly 1,200 scholars and editors. This edition contains more than 21,000 signed entries, including 2,600 brand-new entries and 12,000 changed entries.

=== Online access ===
All volumes of the first edition, some year books and the Decennial Book 1983 - 1992: events of 1982 - 1993 are at the Internet Archive separately.

All volumes of the second edition are at the Internet Archive together.

Most entries of the second edition are accessible via the Encyclopedia.com search engine. At the head of some entries "updated" appears.

== Critical reception and awards ==
Reviews from library literature have been positive. Donald Altschiller of Boston University, writing in Choice, states that the second edition of Encyclopaedia Judaica "has already attained a secure place in the reference pantheon...Essential." Barbara Bibel, writing in Booklist, calls the set "a welcome addition to reference collections."

=== Dartmouth Medal ===
The second edition of the Encyclopaedia received a number of major awards for excellence, including the 2007 Dartmouth Medal from the American Library Association, the most prestigious award in the field of reference publishing." In presenting the award, Edward Kownslar, the chairman of the Dartmouth Medal committee said: "This 22-volume set is an authoritative, interdisciplinary and comprehensive examination of all aspects of Jewish life, history and culture. This title is an extensive revision of the first edition, which was published in 1972, and has 2600 new entries. In addition to updating all world and political events affecting Jewish life and culture since the early 1970s, 'Judaica' has significantly enhanced biblical studies and the Holocaust from the first edition. This title has also expanded the area of women's studies."

=== Other awards ===
The Encyclopaedia was also named in the "Best Reference 2007" list by the Library Journal, and was added to the list of "Outstanding Reference Sources for Small and Medium-sized Libraries" by the Reference and User Services Association of the American Library Association in 2008.

== See also ==
- Association for Jewish Studies (U.S.)
- British Association for Jewish Studies
- Dead Sea Scrolls
- Encyclopedia Talmudit
- Hebrew Publishing Company
- Jewish Encyclopedia
- Jewish English Bible translations
- Jewish Publication Society
- Judaica Press
- Koren Publishers Jerusalem
- National Library of Israel
- Rabbinic literature
- Sefaria
- Shorter Jewish Encyclopedia
- The New Jewish Encyclopedia
- Torah database
