= AJS Review =

Jewish studies academic journal

- Discipline: Biblical studies, Jewish studies, Religious studies
- Language: English
- Edited by: Gregg E. Gardner; Jonathan Marc Gribetz

Publication details
- Publisher: Cambridge University Press on behalf of the Association for Jewish Studies (1976–2021); University of Pennsylvania Press on behalf of the Association for Jewish Studies (2022–present) (United States)
- Frequency: Biannual

Standard abbreviations
- ISO 4: AJS Rev.

Indexing
- ISSN: 0364-0094 (print); 1475-4541 (web)

Links
- Journal homepage; Publisher website

AJS Review is an academic journal published by the University of Pennsylvania Press on behalf of the Association for Jewish Studies that focuses on scholarly articles and book reviews covering the academic field of Jewish studies. From 1976 to 2021, Cambridge University Press published the AJS Review, until the journal was acquired by the University of Pennsylvania Press in 2022. It is currently edited by Gregg E. Gardner and Jonathan Marc Gribetz.

From biblical and rabbinic textual and historical studies to modern history, social sciences, the arts, and literature, the journal welcomes articles of interest to both academic and lay audiences around the world. A substantial portion of each volume is devoted to reviews of the latest scholarly Judaica and to review essays on current trends in publishing.
