= Jewish Publication Society of America Version =

1917 English translation of the Hebrew Bible

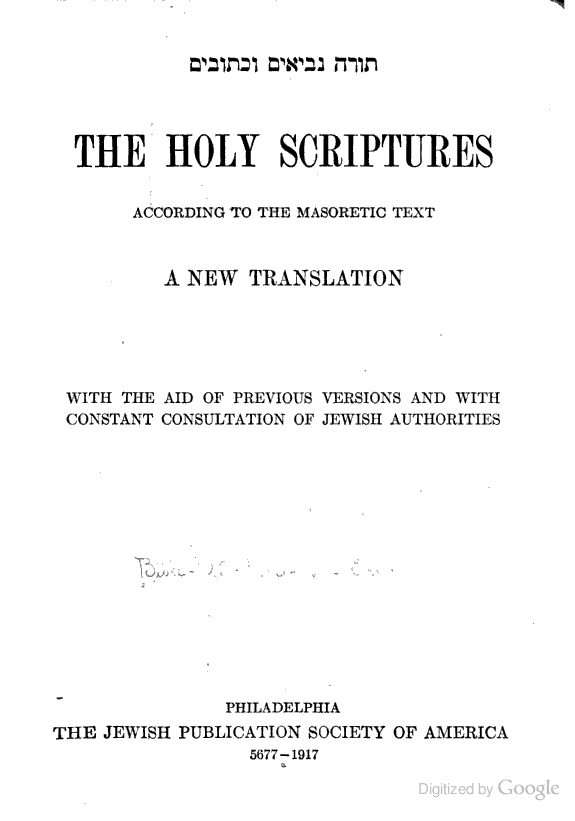
The Holy Scriptures According to the Masoretic Text, the 1917 Jewish Publication Society translation

The Jewish Publication Society of America Version (JPS) of the Tanakh (the Hebrew Bible) was the first Bible translation published by the Jewish Publication Society of America and the first translation of the Tanakh into English by a committee of Jews (though there had been earlier solo efforts, such as that of Isaac Leeser). The full publication title is The Holy Scriptures According to the Masoretic Text: A New Translation with the Aid of Previous Versions and with Constant Consultation of Jewish Authorities.

== Earlier translations ==
The translation, which appeared in 1917, is heavily indebted to the Revised Version and American Standard Version. It differs from them in many passages where Jewish and Christian interpretations differ, notably in Isaiah 7:14, where it has "young woman" as opposed to the word "virgin" which is used in most Christian Bibles.

The translation was initiated in 1892 by the Central Conference of American Rabbis, the organization of Reform rabbis, and the original intention was to assign different books of the Bible to individual rabbis and scholars. A committee of editors would ensure quality and consistency. It became clear after several years that this method was hard to implement, and after more than a decade only the Book of Psalms had been sent to press. In 1908 the Jewish Publication Society agreed to take over the project.

The Jewish Publication Society's plan called for a committee of seven editors who would be responsible for the entire translation. They included Solomon Schechter, Cyrus Adler and Joseph Jacobs, from the Society, and Kaufmann Kohler, David Philipson, and Samuel Schulman, from the Central Conference of American Rabbis. They were led by Editor-in-Chief Max Margolis. The editorial committee comprised an equal number of faculty from Hebrew Union College in Cincinnati, Jewish Theological Seminary in New York City, and Dropsie College for Hebrew in Philadelphia. The work was completed in November 1915 and published two years later.

The translators state their reason for a new version in their "Preface," in a passage that suggests the emotional as well as rational need they felt for a Bible of their own:

The repeated efforts by Jews in the field of biblical translation show their sentiment toward translations prepared by other denominations. The dominant feature of this sentiment, apart from the thought that the christological interpretations in non-Jewish translations are out of place in a Jewish Bible, is and was that the Jew cannot afford to have his Bible translation prepared for him by others. He cannot have it as a gift, even as he cannot borrow his soul from others. If a new country and a new language metamorphose him into a new man, the duty of this new man is to prepare a new garb and a new method of expression for what is most sacred and most dear to him.

The translation is based on the Hebrew Masoretic Text. It follows the edition of Seligman Baer except for the books of Exodus to Deuteronomy, which never appeared in Baer's edition. For those books, C. D. Ginsburg's Hebrew text was used.

== Book order ==
The order of the books is Torah (the five books of Moses), Nevi'im (Prophets) and Ketuvim (Writings). Christian readers would note differences in the order of the books from the Christian Bible, as well as some breaks in where chapters begin and end (such as Deuteronomy 12:32 vs. 13:1), and also in Tehillim (Psalms) where the titles are often counted as the first verse, causing a difference of one in verse numbering for these psalms as they appear in Christian Bibles.

== Later translation ==
This translation was superseded by the JPS Tanakh (NJPS), which appeared in a complete form in 1985. However, the 1917 version is still widely disseminated through its appearance in the commentaries of the Soncino Books of the Bible and the Torah commentary edited by Joseph H. Hertz. Further, it has influenced many subsequent 20th century translations by drawing attention to the Jewish view of many passages.

== See also ==
- Jewish English Bible translations
