= The Jewish Encyclopedia =

Jewish-themed encyclopedia

The Jewish Encyclopedia: A Descriptive Record of the History, Religion, Literature, and Customs of the Jewish People from the Earliest Times to the Present Day
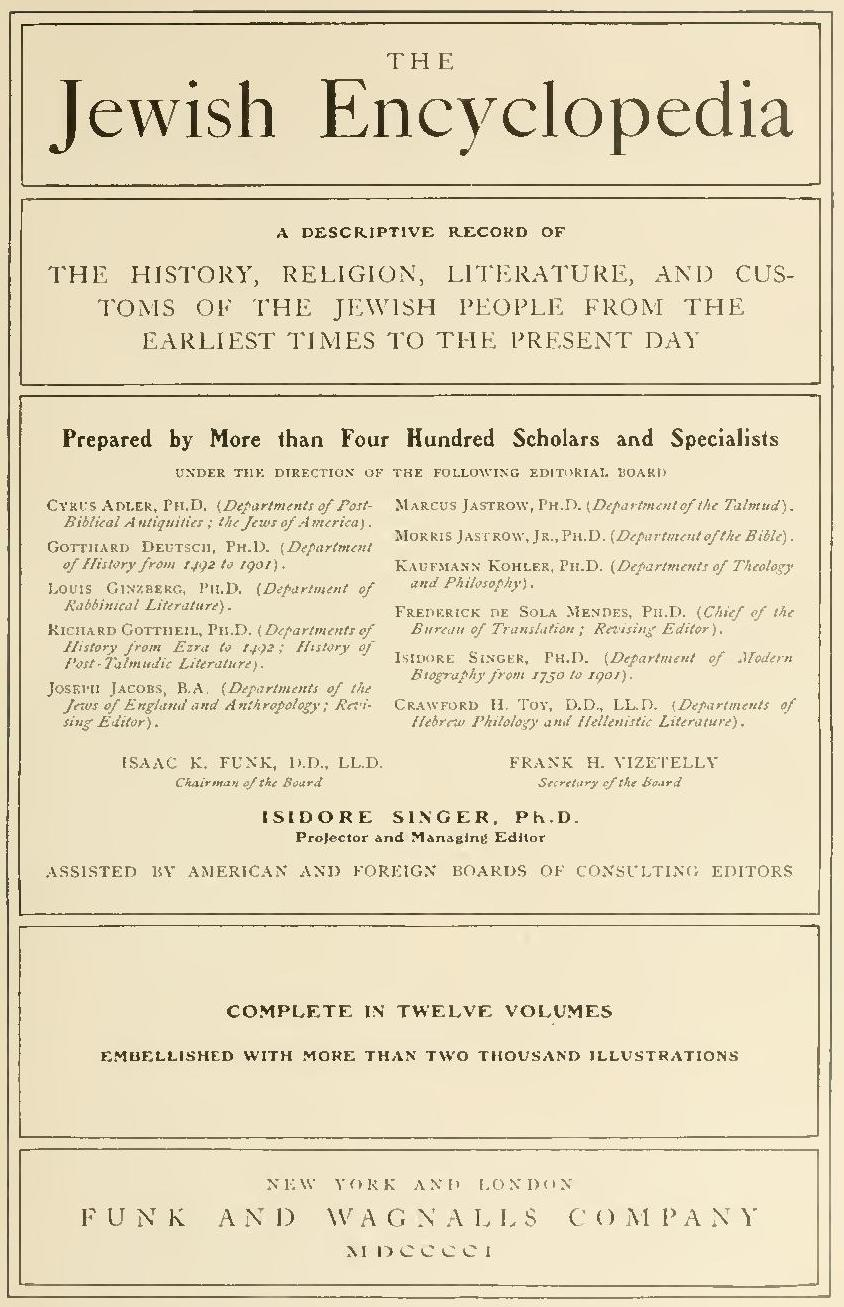
- Cover page of the 1901 edition
- Editor: Isidore Singer
- Language: English
- Publisher: Funk & Wagnalls
- Publication date: between 1901 and 1906

The Jewish Encyclopedia: A Descriptive Record of the History, Religion, Literature, and Customs of the Jewish People from the Earliest Times to the Present Day is an English-language encyclopedia containing over 15,000 articles on the history, culture, and state of Judaism up to the early 20th century. The encyclopedia's managing editor was Isidore Singer and the editorial board was chaired by Isaac K. Funk and Frank H. Vizetelly.

The work's scholarship is still highly regarded. The American Jewish Archives deemed it "the most monumental Jewish scientific work of modern times", and Rabbi Joshua L. Segal said "for events prior to 1900, it is considered to offer a level of scholarship superior to either of the more recent Jewish encyclopedias written in English."

It was originally published in 12 volumes between 1901 and 1906 by Funk & Wagnalls of New York, and reprinted in the 1960s by KTAV Publishing House. It is now in the public domain.

== Conception and editorial outline ==
=== Conception ===
Singer conceived of a Jewish encyclopedia in Europe and proposed creating an Allgemeine Encyklopädia für Geschichte und Wissenschaft des Judenthums in 1891. He envisioned 12 volumes, published over 10 to 15 years, at a cost of 50 dollars as a set. They would contain scientific and unbiased articles on ancient and modern Jewish culture. This proposal received good press coverage and interest from the Brockhaus publishing company. After the House of Rothschild in Paris, consulted by Zadoc Kahn, offered to back the project with only eight percent of the minimum funds requested by Brockaus, the project was abandoned. Following the Dreyfus affair and associated unpleasantness, Singer emigrated to New York City.

Initially believing that American Jews could do little more than provide funding for his project, Singer was impressed by the level of scholarship in the United States. He wrote a new prospectus, changing the title of his planned encyclopedia to Encyclopedia of the History and Mental Evolution of the Jewish Race. His radical ecumenism and opposition to orthodoxy upset many of his Jewish readers; nevertheless he attracted the interest of publisher Isaac K. Funk, a Lutheran minister who also believed in integrating Judaism and Christianity. Funk agreed to publish the encyclopedia on the condition that it remain unbiased on issues which might seem unfavorable for Jews. Singer accepted and was established in an office at Funk & Wagnalls on 2 May 1898.

Publication of the prospectus in 1898 created a severe backlash, including accusations of poor scholarship and of subservience to Christians. Kaufmann Kohler and Gotthard Deutsch, writing in American Hebrew, highlighted Singer's factual errors, and accused him of commercialism and irreligiosity. Now considering that the project could not succeed with Singer at the helm, Funk & Wagnalls appointed an editorial board to oversee creation of the encyclopedia.

=== Editorial board ===
Funk & Wagnalls assembled an editorial board between October 1898 and March 1899. Singer toned down his ideological rhetoric, indicated his desire to collaborate, and changed the work's proposed title to The Jewish Encyclopedia. Despite their reservations about Singer, rabbi Gustav Gottheil and Cyrus Adler agreed to join the board, followed by Morris Jastrow, Frederick de Sola Mendes, and two published critics of the project: Kauffmann Kohler and Gotthard Deutsch.

Theologian and Presbyterian minister George Foot Moore was added to the board for balance. Soon after work started, Moore withdrew and was replaced by Baptist minister Crawford Toy. Last was added the elderly Marcus Jastrow, mostly for his symbolic imprimatur as America's leading Talmudist. In March 1899, the Central Conference of American Rabbis, which had been contemplating a competing project, agreed to discuss collaborating with Funk & Wagnalls—thus securing the position of the Jewish Encyclopedia as the only major project of its kind. Shuly Rubin Schwartz describes the payment scheme arranged at this time as follows:

Members of the local executive committee, exclusive of Singer and, of course, Funk, would receive one thousand dollars per annum, while the rest of the department editors would receive five hundred. All collaborators, editors included, would be paid five dollars per printed page of about one thousand English words. If the article was written in a foreign language, payment would be only $3.50 per page. Singer's compensation was forty dollars a week (thirty-five plus five for a life insurance premium). His salary was considered an advance, since Singer alone was to share with the company in the profits.

Other editors participating in all 12 volumes were Gotthard Deutsch, Richard Gottheil, Joseph Jacobs, Kaufmann Kohler, Herman Rosenthal, and Crawford Howell Toy. Morris Jastrow, Jr. and Frederick de Sola Mendes assisted with volumes I to II; Marcus Jastrow with volumes I, II, and III; Louis Ginzberg with the first four volumes; Solomon Schechter with volumes IV through VII; Emil G. Hirsch with volumes IV through XII; and Wilhelm Bacher with volumes VIII through XII. William Popper served as assistant revision editor and chief of translation for volumes IV through XII.

The editors plunged into their enormous task and soon identified and solved some inefficiencies with the project. Article assignments were shuffled around and communication practices were streamlined. Joseph Jacobs was hired as a coordinator. He also wrote four hundred articles and procured many of the encyclopedia's illustrations. Herman Rosenthal, an authority on Russia, was added as an editor. Louis Ginzberg joined the project and later became head of the rabbinical literature department.

The board naturally faced many difficult editorial questions and disagreements. Singer wanted specific entries for every Jewish community in the world, with detailed information about, for example, the name and dates of the first Jewish settler in Prague. Conflict also arose over what types of Bible interpretation should be included, as some editors feared that Morris Jastrow's involvement in "higher criticism" would lead to unfavorable treatment of scripture.

== Scholarship ==
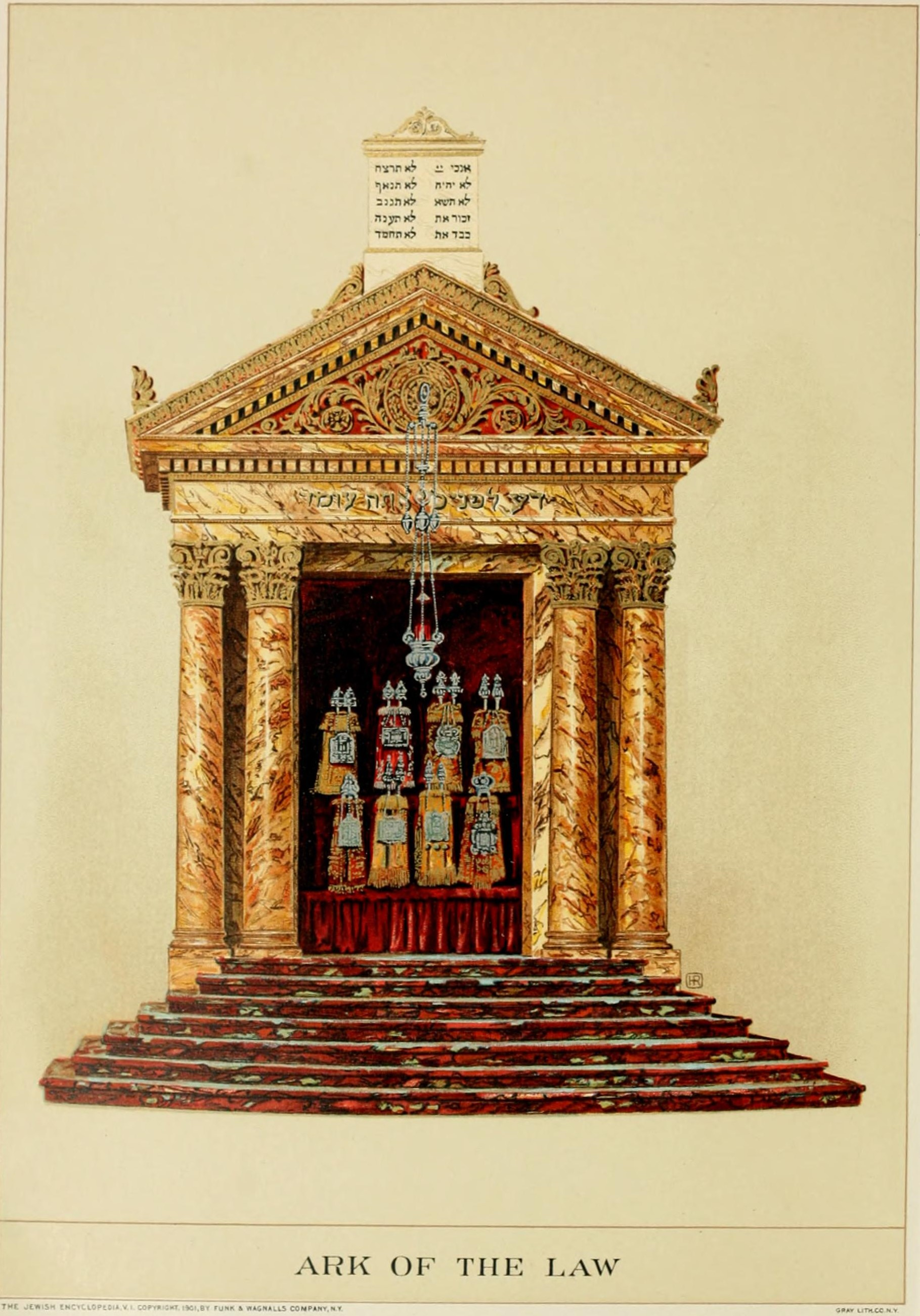
The first edition's first illustration: "Ark of the Law"

The scholarly style of The Jewish Encyclopedia aligns directly to the Wissenschaft des Judentums, an approach to Jewish scholarship and religion that flourished in 19th-century Germany. The encyclopedia may be regarded as the culmination of this movement, which sought to modernize scholarly methods in Jewish research. In the 20th century, the movement's members dispersed to Jewish Studies departments in the United States and Israel.

The scholarly authorities cited in the encyclopedia—besides the classical and medieval exegetes—are almost uniformly Wissenschaft figures, such as Leopold Zunz, Moritz Steinschneider, Solomon Schechter, Wilhelm Bacher, Solomon Judah Loeb Rapoport, David Zvi Hoffmann, and Heinrich Graetz. Its scholarly style is evident by the encyclopedia's almost obsessive attention to manuscript discovery, editing, publication, comparison, and dating. These endeavors were among the foremost interests of Wissenschaft scholarship.

The Jewish Encyclopedia is an English-language work, but the vast majority of the encyclopedia's contemporary sources are German-language sources, since this was the mother tongue of the Wissenschaft scholars and the lingua franca of Biblical scholarship in general in that period. Of all works cited not in German—usually the more classical works—the largest part are either in Hebrew or Arabic. The only heavily cited English-language source of contemporary scholarship is Schechter's publications in The Jewish Quarterly Review.

The significance of the work's publication in English rather than German or Hebrew is captured by Harry Wolfson, writing in 1926:

About twenty-five years ago, there was no greater desert, as far as Jewish life and learning, than the English-speaking countries, and English of all languages was the least serviceable for such a Jewish work of reference. To contemporary European reviewers of The Jewish Encyclopedia, the undertaking seemed then like an effort wasted on half-clad Zulus in South Africa and Jewish tailors in New York. Those who were then really in need of such a work and could benefit thereby would have been better served if it were put out in Hebrew, German or Russian.

The editors and authors of The Jewish Encyclopedia proved prescient in their choice of language, since within that same span of 25 years, English rose to become the dominant language of academic Jewish scholarship and among Jews worldwide. Wolfson continues that "if a Jewish Encyclopedia in a modern language were planned for the first time, the choice would undoubtedly have fallen upon English."

== Editions and Russian spin-off ==
=== Print edition (1901-1906): apparatus ===
The scholarly apparatus of citation is thorough, but can be a bit daunting to contemporary users. Books that might have been widely known among scholars of Judaism at the time the encyclopedia was written (but which are quite obscure to a lay reader today) are referred to by author and title, but with no publication information and often without indication of the language in which they were written.

=== Online ===
The unedited text of the original can be found at The Jewish Encyclopedia website. It offers both JPEG facsimiles of the original articles and Unicode transcriptions of all texts.

The search capability is somewhat handicapped by the fact that the search mechanism fails to take into account the decision to maintain all diacritical marks in the transliterated Hebrew and Aramaic from the 1901–1906 text, which used a large number of diacriticals not in common use today. Thus, for example, to successfully search for "Halizah"—the ceremony by which the widow of a brother who has died childless released her brother-in-law from the obligation of marrying her—one would have to know that they have transliterated this as "Ḥaliẓah". The alphabetic index ignores diacriticals so it can be more useful when searching for an article whose title is known.

=== Russian JE (1906-1913) ===
The Jewish Encyclopedia was heavily used as a source by the 16-volume Jewish Encyclopedia in Russian, published by Brockhaus and Efron in Saint Petersburg between 1906 and 1913.

== See also ==
- Association for Jewish Studies (U.S.)
- British Association for Jewish Studies
- Dead Sea Scrolls
- Encyclopedia Judaica
- Encyclopedia Talmudit
- Hebrew Publishing Company
- Algemeyne Entsiklopedye
- Jewish English Bible translations
- Jewish Publication Society
- Koren Publishers Jerusalem
- National Library of Israel
- Rabbinic literature
- Sefaria
- Shorter Jewish Encyclopedia
- The New Jewish Encyclopedia
- Torah database
