= Association for Jewish Studies =

American scholarly organization

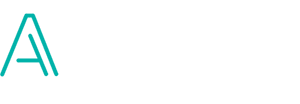
- Formation: December 1968; 57 years ago
- Founder: Leon Jick
- President: Helen Kim
- Website: associationforjewishstudies.org

The Association for Jewish Studies (AJS) is a scholarly organization based in New York City, that promotes the academic field of Jewish Studies around the world.

== History ==
The Association for Jewish Studies (AJS) was founded in December 1968 by a small group of scholars at Brandeis University in Waltham, Massachusetts, seeking a forum for exploring methodological and pedagogical issues in the merging field of Jewish studies. AJS held where it held its first annual conference that year at Brandeis.

In 1976, the AJS began to publish a scholarly journal, the AJS Review. In 1986, the new Women's Caucus of AJS spearheaded the introduction of women's studies into Jewish studies. AJS celebrated its 50th anniversary in 2018, by when it had grown to over 2,000 members from 26 countries, the largest academic Jewish studies organization in the world. The group's membership was nearly equal between men and women.

In 2023, the AJS's executive committee signed a statement authored by the American Council of Learned Societies (ACLS) against the HB 999 legislation dealing with public universities in Florida. During the same year, Steven Fine, a professor of Yeshiva University and the founding editor of AJS Perspectives: The Magazine of the Association for Jewish Studies, criticized the AJS for allegedly becoming politicized and "taken over by the progressive left", and renounced his membership in AJS.

== See also ==
- Antisemitism studies
- British Association for Jewish Studies
- Encyclopedia Judaica
- Encyclopedia Talmudit
- Hebrew Publishing Company
- Jewish Encyclopedia
- Jewish English Bible translations
- Jewish Publication Society
- Judaica Press
- Koren Publishers Jerusalem
- National Library of Israel
- Rabbinic literature
- Sefaria
- Torah database
