= Cecil Roth =

British historian (1899-1970)

Cecil Roth (5 March 1899 – 21 June 1970) FRSL FRHistS was an English historian, with interests particularly focused on the history of Judaism. He was editor-in-chief of the Encyclopaedia Judaica.

== Life ==
Roth was born in Dalston, London, on 5 March 1899. His parents were Etty and Joseph Roth, and Cecil was the youngest of their four sons. In childhood, Cecil received a traditional Jewish religious education, including studying Hebrew with Jacob Mann. He went to school at City of London School. He fought in the First World War, seeing active duty in France in 1918.

Roth studied history at Merton College, Oxford. He took a first-class B.A. in modern history in 1922, and a D.Phil. in 1924. His first published work, based on his thesis, was The Last Florentine Republic (1527–1530), published in 1925. Roth was elected a Fellow of the Royal Historical Society in the same year and a Fellow of the Royal Society of Literature in 1941.

In 1928 he married Irene Rosalind Davis and lived off freelance writing until returning to Oxford as Reader in Post-Biblical Jewish Studies from 1939 to 1964.

The couple were enthusiastic collectors of Judaism-related manuscripts and objets d'art, selling substantial collections of the former to the Brotherton Library of the University of Leeds in 1961, and of the latter to the Beth Tzedec Synagogue Museum in Toronto.

On his retirement from Oxford in 1964, at the invitation of Joseph H. Lookstein, Roth became a visiting professor at Bar-Ilan University, Israel, moving to Jerusalem. However, within a month of his arrival he was attacked in a publication by Rabbi Avraham Yitzhak Bromberg for allegedly arguing that Moses never existed – when in fact he had noted others' scepticism about Moses' existence and argued that Moses had in fact lived. The accusation prompted a scandal, and Roth suffered a heart attack in November 1964. Roth's wife Irene attributed the heart attack partly to stress of migrating, and partly to the stress of the accusations. Roth stood down from his position at the University early in 1965, citing ill health. He went on to hold a position at the Queens College, City University of New York (1966–1969) while working as general editor of the Encyclopaedia Judaica, dying in post shortly after the first edition of the encyclopaedia was completed.

Roth died, aged 71, on 21 June 1970 in Jerusalem.

== Works ==
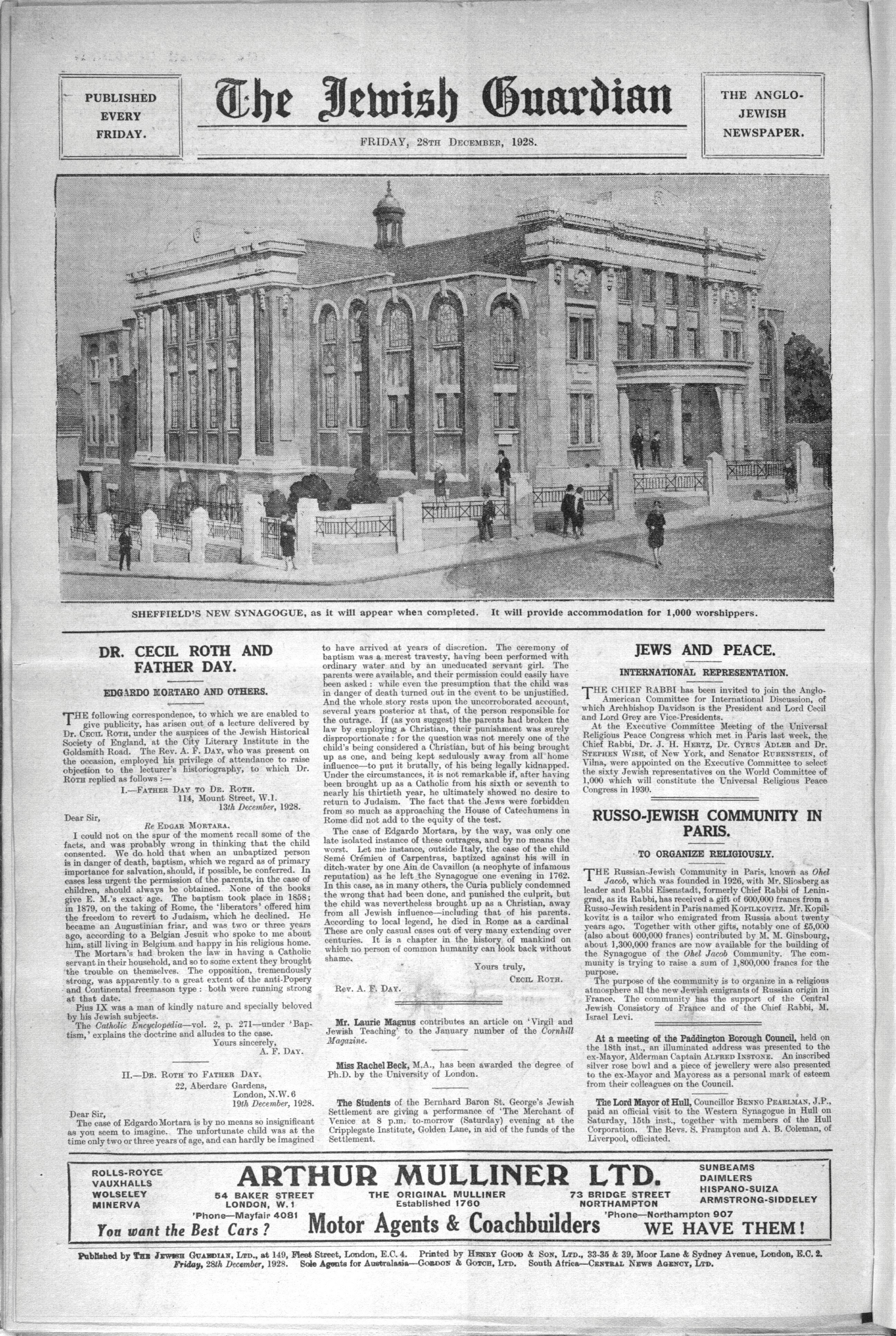
The Jewish Guardian (London), 28 December 1928, back page, featuring a letter by Roth

He was editor-in-chief of the Encyclopaedia Judaica from 1965 until his death.

His works number over 600 items, including:

- The Last Florentine Republic (1527–1530) (London, 1925)
- Roth, Cecil (1974) [1932]. A History of the Marranos (5th ed.). New York, United States: Sepher-Hermon Press. ISBN 0872031381.
- Life of Menasseh Ben Israel (Philadelphia, 1934)
- Roth Haggadah (1934)
- The Ritual Murder Libel and the Jew (London, The Woburn Press, 1935)
- A Short History of the Jewish people (Macmillan, London 1936)
- Magna Bibliotheca Anglo-Judaica: a Bibliographical Guide to Anglo-Jewish History (London, 1937)
- The Spanish Inquisition (Robert Hale Limited 1937)
- Anglo-Jewish Letters, 1158–1917 (London, 1938)
- History of the Great Synagogue (of London), available online, as part of the Susser Archive of JCR-UK
- The Jewish Contribution to Civilization (New York, 1941)
- History of the Jews in England (Oxford, 1941)
- History of the Jews in Italy (Philadelphia, 1946)
- The Rise of Provincial Jewry (Oxford, 1950), available online, as part of the Susser Archive of JCR-UK
- History of the Jews (initially published as A Bird's-Eye View of Jewish History) (1954)
- The Jews in the Renaissance (Philadelphia, 1959)
- Jewish Art (1961)
- The Dead Sea Scrolls (1965)
- The House of Nasi: Doña Gracia (1969)

== Biography ==
- Roth, Irene. Cecil Roth: Historian without Tears. A Memoir (New York: Sepher-Hermon Press, 1982), ISBN 9780872031036
