= Benedikt Isserlin =

Historian (1916–2005)

- Born: 1916; Munich, Germany
- Died: 2005 (aged 88–89); Leeds, England

Academic background
- Education: Magdalen College, Oxford

Academic work
- Discipline: History

Benedikt Sigmund Johannes Isserlin (1916 – 2005) was a scholar of Hebrew who was Head of the Department of Semitic Studies at the University of Leeds.

== Early life and education ==
Isserlin was born in Munich in 1916. He left Germany in the early 1930s and completed his schooling in Switzerland. In 1935 he went to the University of Edinburgh to read History and Archaeology. He graduated in 1939 and moved to Magdalen College, Oxford to read Oriental Languages, specialising in Hebrew and Arabic.

Isserlin taught German at King Alfred's School in Wantage for several years before returning to Oxford University in 1947 as Kennicott Hebrew Fellow for three years. He was awarded the degree of BLitt by Oxford in 1951 and in 1954 he was awarded a DPhil, also by Oxford, for a thesis on place names in ancient Palestine.

== Academic career ==
Isserlin was appointed Assistant Lecturer in Hebrew in the Department of Semitic Languages and Literatures at the University of Leeds in 1951. He was promoted to Lecturer in 1952 and to Senior Lecturer and Head of the department in 1960. In 1977 he was further promoted to Reader. He retired in 1981.

== Death ==
Isserlin died on 23 October 2005.

== Publications ==
- The Israelites, London: Thames and Hudson, 1998. ISBN 0-500-05082-1
