= Peninnah Schram =

American academic and folklorist (born 1934)

- Born: Peninnah Pearl Manchester; December 28, 1934 (age 91); New London, Connecticut, U.S.
- Education: University of Connecticut; Columbia University

Peninnah Schram (born December 28, 1934) is an American academic, author, and folklorist focused on Jewish storytelling.

== Early life and education ==
Schram was born and raised in New London, Connecticut. She was the second child of Samuel E. Manchester (1878-1970), a Lithuanian-American cantor and composer, and Dora (nee Markman, d. 1978), a Belarusian-American Yiddish enthusiast and entrepreneur. Growing up, both of her parents frequently told her stories. She attended The Williams School in New London.

She earned her bachelor's degree at the University of Connecticut (graduated 1956), and went on to obtain a master's degree at Columbia University in 1968.

== Career ==
In 1964, Schram and one of her friends founded Theatre à la Carte, which put on plays in New York. She two began working with the Jewish Heritage Theatre at the 92nd Street Y in 1966, where they wrote musical plays for children.

Schram began teaching at Iona College in 1967. After two years, she began working at Stern College for Women in their speech and drama department.

Schram became interested in Jewish storytelling in 1970, after working with the Jewish Braille Institute to record books for the blind. In 1974, Schram taught a class on Jewish storytelling for the first time; the class was the first American college course to focused on the subject. That same year, she became "storyteller-in-residence" at The Jewish Museum in Manhattan, recorded three albums, and headed two radio series on storytelling. During her time at Stern, Schram organized three Jewish Storytelling Festivals. She later founded the Jewish Storytelling Center.

Schram retired from teaching in 2015, and remains professor emerita of speech and drama at Yeshiva University.

== Personal life ==
In 1958, Schram met and married Irving Schram. The couple moved to Paris in 1960, and visited Israel for the first time in 1961. They had two children: Rebecca (b. 1963) and Mordechai (b. 1965). Irving died in 1967 of a heart attack. Schram remarried in 1974.

== Recognition ==
In 1995, Schram received the Covenant Award for Outstanding Jewish Educator. That same year, she received the National Jewish Book Award for Jewish folklore and anthropology for her book Chosen Tales: Stories Told by Jewish Storytellers. In 2003, the received the National Storytelling Network's Lifetime Achievement Award.

== Publications ==
=== Selected articles ===
- Schram, Peninnah (January 1979). "Where Are Our Storytellers Today?". The Educational Forum. 43 (2): 175–184. doi:10.1080/00131727909338322. ISSN 0013-1725.
- Schram, Peninnah (April 1984). "One generation tells another: The transmission of Jewish values through storytelling". Literature in Performance. 4 (2): 33–45. doi:10.1080/10462938409391555. ISSN 0734-0796.
- Schram, Peninnah (2003). "The Voice is the Messenger of the Heart: Shared Stories Still Work Best". Tradition: A Journal of Orthodox Jewish Thought. 37 (4): 5–37. ISSN 0041-0608. JSTOR 23262465.
- Schram, Peninnah (2005). "Elijah's Cup of Hope: Healing Through the Jewish Storytelling Tradition". Storytelling, Self, Society. 1 (2): 103–117. doi:10.1080/15505340509490268 (inactive 1 July 2025).

=== Books ===
- Schram, Peninnah (1987). Jewish stories one generation tells another. Northvale, N.J: Jason Aronson. ISBN 978-0-87668-967-7.
- Schram, Peninnah (1991). Tales of Elijah the Prophet. Northvale, N.J: J. Aronson. ISBN 978-0-87668-580-8.
- Schram, Peninnah; Allon, Jeffrey (2000). Ten classic Jewish children's stories. New York: Pitspopany Press. ISBN 978-0-943706-96-2.
- Schram, Peninnah (2000). Stories Within Stories: From the Jewish Oral Tradition. Jason Aronson. ISBN 978-0-7657-6142-2.
- Schram, Peninnah (November 2007). The Magic Pomegranate. Lerner Publishing Group. ISBN 978-0-8225-8856-6.
- Schram, Peninnah; De Conno, Gianni (2008). The hungry clothes and other Jewish folktales. Folktales of the world. New York City: Sterling Pub. Co. ISBN 978-1-4027-2651-4. OCLC 132681414.
- Schram, Peninnah; Davis, Rachayl Eckstein (2012). The Apple Tree's Discovery. Kar-Ben. ISBN 978-0-7613-8778-7.
- Sasso, Sandy Eisenberg; Schram, Peninnah (2015). Jewish stories of love and marriage: folktales, legends, and letters. Lanham: Rowman & Littlefield. ISBN 978-1-4422-3898-5.
