= Jewish English Bible translations =

English translations of the Hebrew Bible

Hebrew Bible English translations are English translations of the Hebrew Bible (Tanakh) according to the Masoretic Text, in the traditional division and order of Torah, Nevi'im, and Ketuvim. Most Jewish translations appear in bilingual editions (Hebrew–English).

Jewish translations often reflect traditional Jewish exegesis of the Bible; all such translations eschew the Christological interpretations present in many non-Jewish translations. Jewish translations contain neither the books of the apocrypha nor the Christian New Testament.

== Background ==
English Bible translation has been common among Christians, particularly since the 16th-century Reformation, producing dozens of modern translations and versions in English.

However, equivalent translation efforts have been less widespread among Jews. This is partially due to the fact that English became a major spoken language among Jews only in the era since the Holocaust. Before then, even Jews in English-speaking countries were still part of an immigrant culture to a large extent, which meant that they could either understand the Hebrew Bible in its original language to a certain degree or, if they required a translation, were still not fully comfortable in English. Many translated Bibles and prayer books from before the Holocaust were still in Yiddish, even those published in countries like the United States.

A further reason is that often those Jews who study the Bible regularly still do so, to a greater or lesser extent, in its original language, as it is read in the synagogue. Even those who require translations often prefer a bilingual edition. Nevertheless, Jewish translations of the Bible to English have become far more widespread, especially since the 1980s, and have been made available in numerous complementary versions and styles.

=== An example verse ===
Exodus 20:7–9a (8-10a):

זָכוֹר אֶת-יוֹם הַשַּׁבָּת לְקַדְּשׁוֹ. שֵׁשֶׁת יָמִים תַּעֲבֹד וְעָשִׂיתָ כָּל-מְלַאכְתֶּךָ. וְיוֹם הַשְּׁבִיעִי שַׁבָּת לַיהוָה אֱלֹהֶיךָ לֹא-תַעֲשֶׂה כָל-מְלָאכָה ...

is variously translated:

- Remember the sabbath day, to keep it holy. Six days shalt thou labour, and do all thy work: But the seventh day is a sabbath unto the LORD thy God, in it thou shalt not do any manner of work... (JPS Tanakh, old, 1917)
- Remember the Sabbath day to sanctify it. Six days shall you work and accomplish all your work; but the seventh day is Sabbath to HASHEM, your God; you shall not do any work... (ArtScroll, 1976)
- Remember the Sabbath day to keep it holy. You can work during the six weekdays and do all your tasks. But Saturday is the Sabbath to God your Lord. Do not do anything that constitutes work... (The Living Torah, 1981)
- Remember the Sabbath day and keep it holy. Six days you shall labor and do all your work, but the seventh day is a Sabbath of the LORD your God: you shall not do any work... (JPS Tanakh, new, 1985)
- Remember / the Sabbath day, to hallow it. / For six days, you are to serve, and are to make all your work, / but the seventh day / is Sabbath for YHWH your God: / you are not to make any kind of work... (Everett Fox, Schocken, 1995)
- Remember the sabbath day to hallow it. Six days you shall work and you shall do your tasks, but the seventh day is a sabbath to the LORD your God. You shall do no task... (Robert Alter, The Five Books of Moses, 2004)
- Remember the Sabbath day and keep it holy. Six days you shall labor and do all your work, but the seventh day is a sabbath of the ETERNAL your God: you shall not do any work... (JPS Tanakh, Gender-Sensitive Edition, 2023)

== Isaac Leeser translation ==
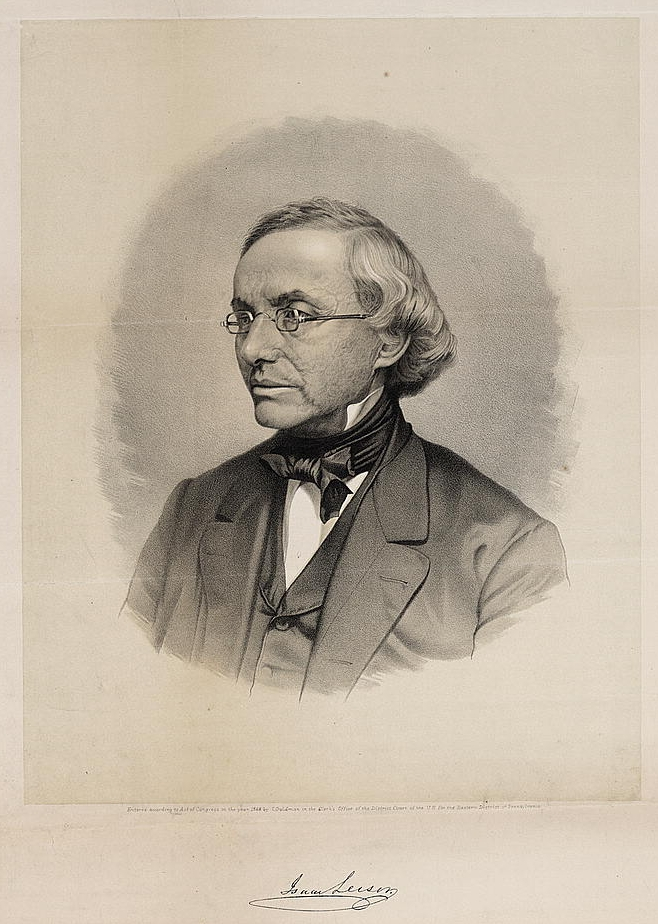
Isaac Leeser

The first American Jewish English translation of the Torah, and subsequently of the entire Tanakh, was the 19th century effort by Isaac Leeser. Leeser began with a five-volume, bilingual Hebrew–English edition of the Torah and haftarot, The Law of God (Philadelphia, 1845). His translation of the entire Bible into English was completed as The Twenty-four books of the Holy Scriptures in 1853 (commonly called The Leeser Bible). In 1857 he re-issued it in a second (folio-size) edition, with abridged notes.

Until the 1917 Jewish Publication Society translation, the Leeser translation was the most important Jewish English translation. It was widely used in North American synagogues and reprinted in England.

A modern writer notes that despite its longevity, Leeser's translation was "wooden" and "devoid of literary distinction". He concludes that "it is perhaps the existence of Leeser's work rather than its merits that marks it as a noteworthy achievement".

== Abraham Benisch translation ==
Following upon the Leeser translation, and partially simultaneously with it, was the Anglo-Jewish translation by Abraham Benisch: Jewish School and Family Bible, which was published in England in four sequential volumes from 1851 to 1861. Benisch's translation of the Torah was published in five volumes, with the Hebrew and English on facing pages. In each volume the text of the Torah is followed by haftarot and the Sabbath prayers.

== Michael Friedländer's Jewish Family Bible ==
Michael Friedländer edited a Jewish Family Bible in English and Hebrew. It was published in England in 1881. The Friedländer edition is similar in style to the King James Version but diverges primarily in places where the King James translation reflects a Christian interpretation that is at odds with the traditional Jewish understanding. While it never gained wide popularity, it influenced the editors of the first JPS edition, and is cited as the basis for a revised translation found in the Koren Hebrew-English edition.

The Jewish Family Bible is currently available in a facsimile edition from Sinai Publishers.

== Jewish Publication Society translations ==
The translations of the Jewish Publication Society of America (JPS) have become the most popular English translations of the Hebrew Bible. JPS has published two such translations.

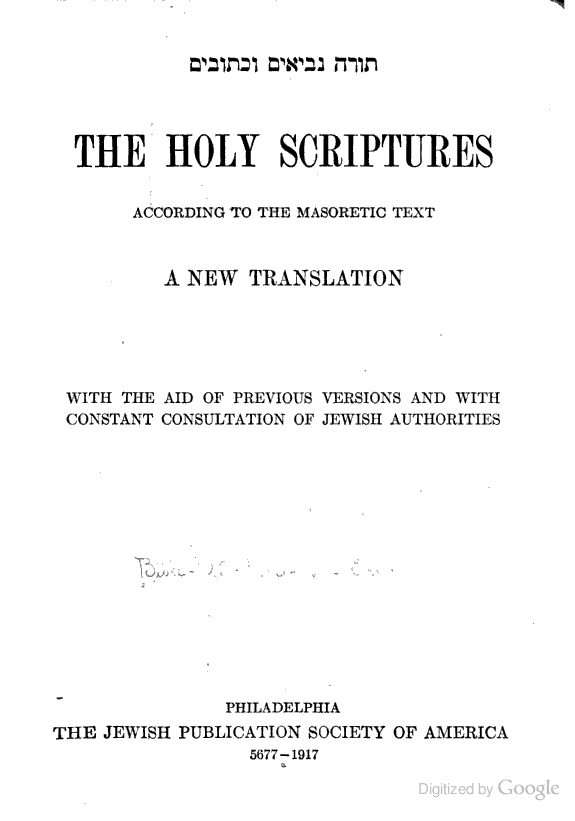
The 1917 JPS translation

=== Old JPS (1917) ===
The first JPS translation was completed in 1917 by a committee led by Max Margolis and was based on the scholarship of its day. Its literary form was consciously based on that of the King James Version; Margolis, a non-native speaker of English, felt that was the proper standard of language that Jews should adopt for their translation. The Old JPS translation was used in a number of Jewish works published before the 1980s, such as the Pentateuch and Haftaroth edited by J. H. Hertz and the Soncino Books of the Bible series. The translation committee included Cyrus Adler, Solomon Schechter, Kaufmann Kohler, Samuel Schulman, and David Philipson. However, Schechter and Jacobs died before the translation was completed.

Some of the copies had been printed with a serious printing error. A typesetter dropped a tray of type for first chapter of Isaiah and had incorrectly reset the type.

=== New JPS (1985) ===
The bilingual Hebrew–English edition of the New JPS translation

The 1917 translation was felt to be outdated by the 1950s, and a new effort developed that involved cooperation between numerous Jewish scholars from a variety of denominations. The translation of the Torah was started in 1955 and completed in 1962. Nevi'im was published in 1978 and Ketuvim in 1984.

The entire Tanakh was revised and published in one volume in 1985, and a bilingual Hebrew–English version appeared in 1999 (also in one volume). The translation is usually referred to as the "New JPS version", abbreviated NJPS (it has also been called the "New Jewish Version" or NJV).

The translators of the New JPS version were experts in both traditional Jewish exegesis of the Bible and modern biblical scholarship. The translation attempts in all cases to present the original meaning of the text in a highly aesthetic form. The translation is not a word-for-word translation and is described by its publisher as being "in the spirit of Saadia".

The New JPS version is adapted for gender-neutral language in The Torah: A Modern Commentary, revised edition (2005, Union for Reform Judaism, ISBN 978-0-8074-0883-4), the official Torah commentary of Reform Judaism, where it appears together with the work of translator Chaim Stern. NJPS is also used in Etz Hayim: Torah and Commentary (2001, Jewish Publication Society, ISBN 0-8276-0712-1), the official Torah commentary of Conservative Judaism. It is the base translation for The Jewish Study Bible (2004, Oxford University Press, ISBN 0-19-529751-2). NJPS is also the basis for The Contemporary Torah: A Gender-Sensitive Adaptation of the JPS Translation (2006, JPS, ISBN 0-8276-0796-2), also known as CJPS. The JPS Bible, a pocket paperback edition of the New JPS version was published and made available as of 2008 by the Jewish Publication Society as well as an illustrated children's Bible as of 2009.

Since 2017, the bilingual Hebrew-English edition of the JPS Tanakh (1985 translation) has been digitalized and is available online for free on the website Sefaria.

== The Holy Scriptures ==
First published in 1916, revised in 1951, by the Hebrew Publishing Company, revised by Alexander Harkavy, a Hebrew Bible translation in English, which contains the form Jehovah as the Divine Name in Exodus 6:3, Psalm 83:18, and Isaiah 12:2 and three times in compound place names at Genesis 22:14, Exodus 17:15 and Judges 6:24 as well as Jah in Psalm 68:4. The use of the divine name Jehovah was and still is very unusual for a Jewish Bible, although this Bible never gained the popularity of the JPS Tanakh, Alexander Harkavy has been remembered for his contributions to Jewish literature and the development of modern Yiddish. This Bible's translation style is comparable to the 1917 JPS Tanakh.

== The Jewish Bible for Family Reading ==
In 1957 Joseph Gaer produced an abridged translation called The Jewish Bible for Family Reading. Influenced by biblical source criticism and the documentary hypothesis, Gaer moved all "duplications, specifications, detailed descriptions of rituals and genealogies" to a summary in an appendix; made a separate appendix summary of the Torah's "principal laws;" and omitted "all obvious redundancies."

Intended for the English reader with little or no knowledge of Hebrew, the text of The Jewish Bible for Family Reading is organized in brief sections with descriptive titles (such as "The Story of Creation" and "Isaac Takes a Bride") without the verse numbers that are typical of Bible translations.

== The Koren Jerusalem Bible ==
The Koren Jerusalem Bible (not to be confused with the Catholic translation with a similar title) is a Hebrew/English Tanakh by Koren Publishers Jerusalem. The Koren Bible was the first Bible published in modern Israel. The English translation in The Koren Jerusalem Bible, which is Koren's Hebrew/English edition, is by Professor Harold Fisch, a Biblical and literary scholar, and is based on Friedländer's 1881 Jewish Family Bible, but it has been "thoroughly corrected, modernized, and revised".

The Koren Jerusalem Bible incorporates some unique features:

- The paragraphing of the English translation parallels the division of the parashot in the Hebrew version on the facing page. Chapter and verse numbers are noted only in the margin (as in the Hebrew version).
- The names of people and places in the translation are transliterations of the Hebrew names, as opposed to the Hellenized versions used in most translations. For example, the Hebrew name Moshe is used instead of the more familiar Moses.
- It uses Koren Type, created by typographer Eliyahu Koren specifically for The Koren Bible, and is a most accurate and legible Hebrew type.

The Koren Jerusalem Bible is sometimes referred to as The Jerusalem Bible, Koren Bible, the Koren Tanakh, or Tanakh Yerushalayim (Hebrew for Jerusalem Bible).

In 2021 Koren issued a completely new translation of the Bible, The Koren Tanakh- The Magerman Edition. The translation of the Pentateuch and much of the Book of Psalms was composed by Rabbi Jonathan Sacks, with a team of translators covering the rest of the Bible.

== Living Torah and Nach ==
Perhaps the first Orthodox translation into contemporary English was The Living Torah by Aryeh Kaplan which was published in 1981 by Moznaim Publishing. After Kaplan's death in 1983, The Living Nach was translated in the same style by various authors.

Kaplan's translation is influenced by traditional rabbinic interpretation and religious law, an approach followed by many later Orthodox translators. It also reflects Kaplan's interest in Jewish mysticism.

The Living Torah is also notable for its use of contemporary, colloquial English. For example, it reverses the usual distinction between "God" and "Lord", noting that in modern English "God" is more appropriate for a proper name. One writer cites these examples, emphasizing Kaplan's modern translation:

- Shemot (Exodus) 20:8–10 — Remember the Sabbath to keep it holy. You can work during the six weekdays and do all your tasks. But Saturday is the Sabbath to God your Lord.
- Vayikra (Leviticus) 18:7 — Do not commit a sexual offense against your father or mother. If a woman is your mother, you must not commit incest with her.
- Vayikra 19:14 — Do not place a stumbling block before the [morally] blind.
- Vayikra 19:29 — Do not defile your daughter with premarital sex.

== Judaica Press ==
Judaica Press, an Orthodox Jewish publisher, has published a multi-volume English translation.

The Judaica Press Complete Tanach with Rashi is a bilingual Hebrew–English translation of the Bible that includes Rashi's commentary in both Hebrew and English. The English translations were made by A. J. Rosenberg. The Complete Tanach with Rashi is available online.

Although the Pentateuch has not been fully published in hardcopy (Genesis [in three volumes] and Exodus [in two volumes] only), Judaica Press also published a set of 24 bilingual Hebrew–English volumes of Mikraot Gedolot for Nevi'im and Ketuvim, published as Books of the Prophets and Writings. As in traditional Mikraot Gedolot, the Hebrew text includes the Masoretic Text, the Aramaic Targum, and several classic rabbinic commentaries. The English translations, by Rosenberg, include a translation of the Biblical text, Rashi's commentary, and a summary of rabbinic and modern commentaries.

Judaica Press has also published other English translations and translations of other commentaries, most notably Samson Raphael Hirsch's German translation and commentary.

== ArtScroll Tanach series ==
In 1976 Mesorah Publications, an Orthodox publisher, began publishing a series of bilingual Hebrew–English books of the Bible under its ArtScroll imprint. The ArtScroll Tanach series includes introductions to each book and a running commentary based on classic rabbinic interpretation.

The Torah volumes were collected, revised, and published in a lone Hebrew–English bilingual volume as the Stone Edition of the Chumash (1993) with a short commentary in English. This Chumash also includes haftarot, Targum, and Rashi. The whole Tanach was published as the Stone Edition of the Tanach (1996).

The English translation in the ArtScroll series relies heavily on the interpretation of Rashi and other traditional sources and religious law. Some critics have said that this approach sometimes results in an English rendering that is as much an explanation as it is a translation. In this regard, one critic likened the ArtScroll volumes to "non-literal" targumim, which interpreted as well as translated the Bible.

One distinctive feature of the ArtScroll series is the way in which it renders the four-letter name of God, יהוה. Most English translations represent this name by the phrase "the Lord"; ArtScroll uses the Hebrew word "Ha-Shem" instead. Ha-Shem, literally "the Name", is an expression often used by Orthodox Jews to refer to God.

The ArtScroll series has become very popular in the Orthodox Jewish community and is in use among non-Orthodox Jews as well.

== Robert Alter translation ==
In 2018 Robert Alter completed his translation of the Hebrew Bible, The Hebrew Bible: A Translation with Commentary. Installments of the translation were released over the course of more than two decades. Alter's goals included preserving the artistry of the Hebrew language in the English translation.

A previous milestone was his 2004 publication of The Five Books of Moses: A Translation with Commentary. Alter aimed to reproduce in his translation the "slight strangeness", "beautiful rhythms", and "magic of biblical style" of the original Hebrew that he felt had been "neglected by English translators".

One way in which Alter tried to accomplish this was by using the same English equivalent in almost every instance that a Hebrew word appears in the Torah. As one reviewer noted, "if a Hebrew adjective is translated as 'beautiful,' it won't next be rendered as 'pretty' or 'attractive.' This is important because it allows the reader to detect narrative and imagistic patterns that would otherwise go unnoticed".

Reviewer John Updike noted Alter also "keep[s] the ubiquitous sentence-beginning 'and,' derived from the Hebrew particle waw; he retains emphatic repetitions, as in 'she, she, too' and 'this red red stuff.'"

== Torah translations ==
Because the Torah is read in a yearly cycle in the synagogue, there are many Jewish translations of the Torah only (without Nevi'im and Ketuvim). Such a translation is sometimes called a chumash, particularly when it is published in a bilingual Hebrew–English edition.

=== Everett Fox ===
Everett Fox translated the Torah (The Five Books of Moses, 1995) for Schocken Press. Fox's approach to translation was inspired by the German translation prepared by Martin Buber and Franz Rosenzweig, and he describes his work as an "offshoot" of theirs. His translation was also guided by the principle that the Bible "was meant to be read aloud". Fox's translation is printed in blank verse, and the personal and place names are transliterated versions of the Hebrew names.

Writer John Updike cited some of these qualities as faults in Fox's translation, describing Fox as "an extremist after Martin Buber and Franz Rosenzweig" who "liberally coins compound adjectives like 'heavy-with-stubbornness' and verbs like 'adulter'" and noted that Fox renders the seventh commandment as "You are not to adulter".

Another reviewer, echoing Updike's comments, wrote that "Fox's use of hyphenated phrases seems to be [modeled] after the German habit of compounding nonce words, a device used frequently by Buber and Rosenzweig in their German translation. The results seem less [strange] in German than in English, and it may be questioned whether such 'strangified' English gives the reader a true impression of what in Hebrew is really quite ordinary."

=== Chaim Miller ===
Chaim Miller's chumash is a translation whose text incorporates Rabbi Menachem Mendel Schneerson's "novel interpretation" of Rashi's commentary, which was delivered in a series of public talks that began in 1964 and continued for more than 25 years. The translation, which was sponsored by Meyer Gutnick and is called "The Gutnick Edition Chumash", is published in a bilingual Hebrew–English edition that includes a running commentary anthologized from classic rabbinic texts. It also includes the haftarot, mystical insights called "Sparks of Chassidus", a summary of the mitzvot found in each parashah according to Sefer ha-Chinuch, an essay on public reading of the Torah, and summary charts.

According to Miller's foreword, unlike most other translations, the Gutnick edition does not intersperse transliterations among the translations; this is intended to make the text more reader-friendly. However, the translation does includes Rashi's commentary in parentheses, and the foreword explains that these are Rashi's words and not a translation of the chumash.

The publication of the 5-volume series by Kol Menachem, Gutnick's publishing company, was completed in 2006.

=== Richard Elliott Friedman ===
In 2001 Richard Elliott Friedman released his Commentary on the Torah, featuring a new translation intended to "reflect more closely the words of the Hebrew" rather than "the translators' judgments of what the original Hebrew says."

== Partial translations ==
=== Translations of individual books of the Bible ===
==== Menachem Mendel Kasher ====
In 1951, Menachem Mendel Kasher translated the book of Genesis and his commentary, Torah SheBaal Peh.

==== Everett Fox ====
In addition to his translation of the Torah, Fox has translated the books of Samuel (Give Us a King!, 1999), and subsequently all of the Early Prophets (Joshua, Judges, Samuel, Kings, 2014).

==== Kehot Publication Society ====
Kehot Publication Society has started a translation of the Torah, and as of March 2007 has completed the books of Shemot (Exodus) and Bamidbar (Numbers). The volumes, titled Torah Chumash Shemos and Torah Chumash Bemidbar, are bilingual Hebrew–English translations that include a running commentary based on Rabbi Menachem Mendel Schneerson's interpretation of Rashi's commentary. The project is supervised by editor-in-chief Moshe Wisnefsky.

==== Heinrich Guggenheimer. ====
Heinrich Guggenheimer published bilingual editions of Psalms (2020) and Job (2021) with original translation shortly before his death in 2021. Guggenheimer's editions are unique in their use of Masoretic punctuation as a formatting guide; every verse is divided according to the indicated syntax both in Hebrew and in English.

=== Incomplete translations ===
==== David Rosenberg ====
In 1977, David Rosenberg, a poet, former editor-in-chief of the Jewish Publication Society, and Visiting Lecturer in Creative Writing at Princeton University, translated the book of Job and released the resulting volume as Job Speaks. It was preceded by his translation of psalms, "Blues of The Sky" (Harper) and followed by "Lightworks: The Book of Isaiah". Later, he translated parts of Genesis, Exodus, Numbers, and Deuteronomy that were deemed to have been written by the Documentary hypothesis J writer, also known as the Yahwist, author of the Bible's oldest strand, and released this volume as The Book of J in 1990, with commentary by American literary critic Harold Bloom. This book sold very well, and in its wake Rosenberg published A Poet's Bible, a poetic translation of several books of the Old Testament and its related apocrypha, in 1991, which won the PEN/Book-of-the-Month Club Prize for 1992, the first American translation of the Bible to ever win a major literary award. It was followed by "The Lost Book of Paradise: Adam and Eve in the Garden of Eden", a translation of various Edenic texts, including Song of Songs, Genesis and apocrypha, in 1993, and "The Book of David," a poetic interpretation of 2nd Samuel and the original author.

Rosenberg worked on A Literary Bible: An Original Translation, a secular, poetic version of the Jewish scriptures. It has been widely reviewed in literary journals, including The New York Times Book Review by Frank Kermode.

==== The Bible Unauthorized ====
In 1942 A. H. Moose published a volume titled The Bible Unauthorized that included a translation of the first few chapters of Bereshit (Genesis) and a "treatise" that "proved" the existence of God, the Biblical account of creation, and other parts of the Bible. Moose claimed that "the real content of the Bible differs greatly from the many erroneous translations" that preceded his, and that his was "likely the first accurate translation".

According to the correspondence of Rabbi Yosef Yitzchok Schneersohn Moose was the pseudonym of Rabbi Aaron Hirsh Levitt, who had worked with Schneersohn.

The Bible Unauthorized has been reprinted several times, most recently as In the Beginning: The Bible Unauthorized (Thirty Seven Books, 2001).

== See also ==
Bible in the Jewish Tradition:

- Tanakh (Hebrew Bible): Torah, Nevi'im, Ketuvim
- Masoretic Text: Aleppo Codex, Leningrad Codex (BHS), Mikraot Gedolot
- Midrash, Targum, Medieval Commentaries, Modern Commentaries
- Jewish commentaries on the Bible

Other translations:

- Bible translations
- Bible translations into Hebrew
- English translations of the Bible
- Modern English Bible translations
