= Shorter Jewish Encyclopedia =

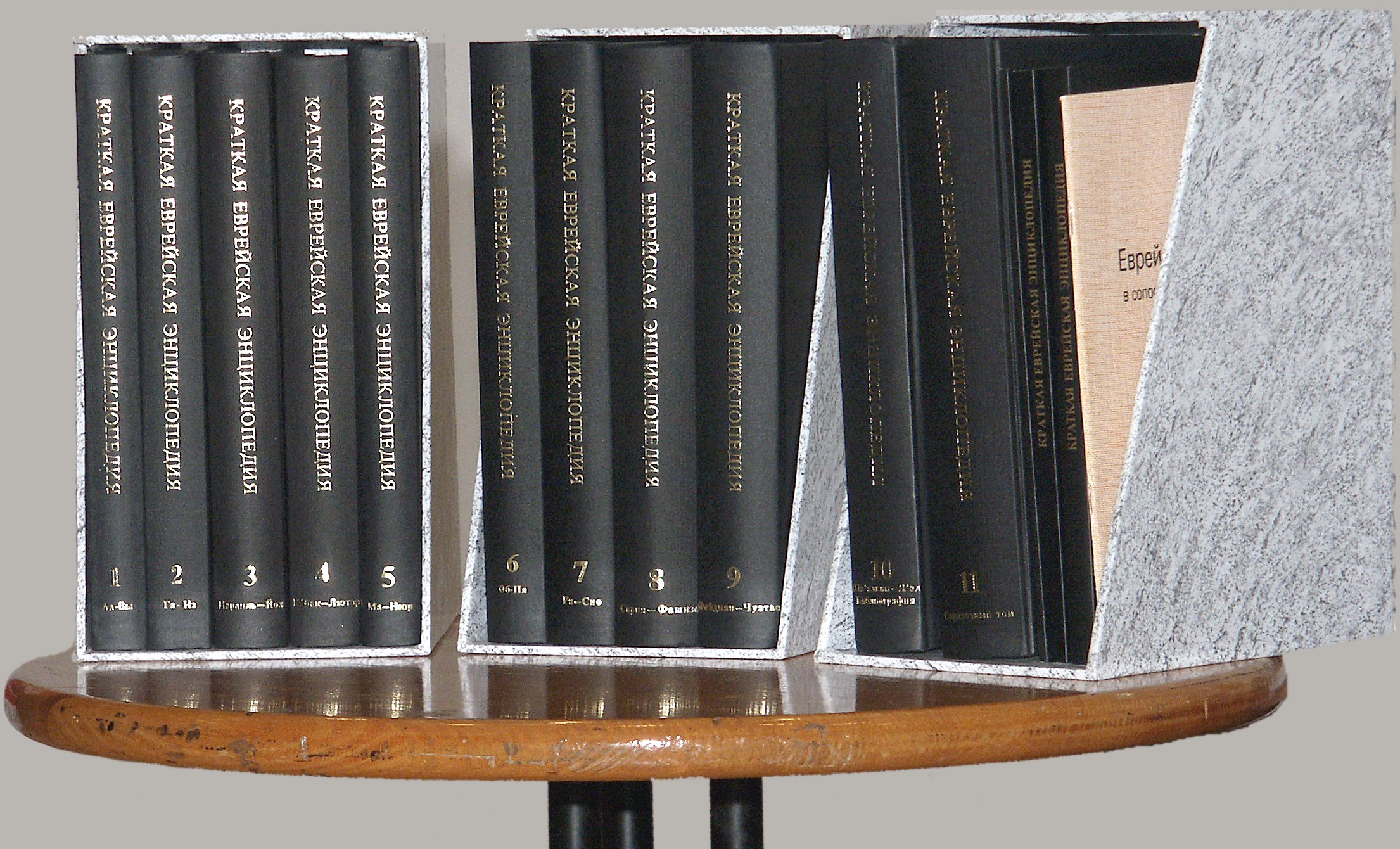
A complete set of the 11-vol. Shorter Encyclopedia Judaica

The Shorter Jewish Encyclopedia (SJE; Russian: Краткая еврейская энциклопедия, romanized: Kratkaya Yevreyskaya Entsiklopedia) was published in 11 volumes in Jerusalem from 1976 to 2005 in Russian by the Society for Research on Jewish Communities with the support of Hebrew University in Jerusalem. The SJE is the only comprehensive encyclopedia on Judaism published in Russian, and followed an almost 70-year gap following the publication of the "Yevreyskaya Entsiklopedia" (Encyclopedia Judaica) of Brokhaus and Efron in Saint Petersburg in 1908.

Although it was originally planned as an abridged translation of the English-language Encyclopaedia Judaica, it became clear as the work progressed that readers raised in the Soviet Union would not be familiar with the concepts lying at the foundation of the cultural and historical system known as Jewish civilization. Therefore, these concepts were elaborated on in greater detail in the SJE, and terms were introduced which lacked equivalents in modern Russian. Most personal and geographic names (in Israel) from the Bible are given in the accepted Hebrew form. The conceptual foundation of the SJE is characterized by a thematic bipolarity: Eretz Israel, and in particular the State of Israel on the one hand, and Russian (i.e., Soviet) Jewry on the other, which nevertheless does not exclude the broad scope of different aspects of the lives and history of Jews in all the other countries of the diaspora.

A group of editors worked on the SJE who prepared articles with the participation of invited specialists and also academic consultants, including the well-known Israeli academics and public figures Shraga Abramson, Mordechai Altschuler, Shlomo Pines, Hayim Tadmor, Chone Shmeruk, Hayyim Schirmann, Menachem Stern, Yaakov Tsur, Yaakov Landau, Israel Bartal, and Michael Liebman. Chairing the editorial board were Shmuel Ettinger and Haim Beinhart. Chief editors were Yitzhak Oren (Nadel), Michael Zand, Naftali Prat, and Ari Avner. The senior academic editors were Peretz Hein, Yosef Glozman, Amnon Ginzai, and Mark Kipnis. The managing editors were Ella Slivkina (vol. 1-10) and Marina Gutgarts.

In practical terms, the SJE was no longer "shorter," and aside from the 11 volumes a "Jewish calendar juxtaposed with a Gregorian calendar (1948-2048)" was published as a pamphlet along with three supplements. Volume 10 also contains a "thematic bibliographic index" with 2,114 items. There are more than 5,300 vocabulary entries, and the total number of words exceeds six million. Volume 11, the final one, included an alphabetized index of subjects, including geographic and personal names and events with references to the volume and column where they are located. A system of citations indicating links between concepts serves as the only cross-reference in the entire corpus of the encyclopedia.

In 1996, the Society for Research on Jewish Communities undertook a reprinting of the first seven volumes of the SJE, which were printed by the printing and publishing house Krasnyj Proletarij in Moscow.

In 2005, the Electronic Jewish Encyclopedia (EJE), Russian: Электронная еврейская энциклопедия, romanized: Elektronnaja Evrejskaja Entsiklopedia) was made available on the internet, presenting an expanded and more precise version of the SJE. Work on the EJE continues today.
