= The New Jewish Encyclopedia =

Cover of the first edition, 1962

The New Jewish Encyclopedia is an encyclopedia first published in 1962. The style is less academic than the Jewish Encyclopedia, in more up-to-date language, and in a single volume format. The original 1962 edition, and the 2nd edition in 1976, were edited by David Bridger, of the Bureau of Jewish Education in Los Angeles, and rabbi Samuel Wolk.
