= British Association for Jewish Studies =

The British Association for Jewish Studies (BAJS) is an organization in the United Kingdom that promotes scholarly study of Jewish culture.

The society was founded in 1975 as a non-profit, professional organization. Its focus is on supporting and cultivating higher education in the British Isles relating to Jewish culture and history. They also organize conferences and support research and publication.

The BAJS conducts a survey each year on what courses in Jewish studies are being offered at British universities. The most recent report may be viewed through a link on the BAJS website. The BAJS also holds two essay competitions annually. One is for undergraduates and the other for post-grads. The winners are awarded £200 each.

== Leadership ==
Past presidents of the BAJS have included:

- 2021 Andrea Schatz
- 2020 Helen Spurling
- 2019 Hindy Najman
- 2018 Julia Egorova
- 2017 Hannah Holtschneider
- 2016 Charlotte Hempel
- 2015 Daniel Langton
- 2014 Zuleika Rodgers
- 2013 Larry Ray
- 2012 Sacha Stern
- 2011 Alison Salvesen
- 2010 Sarah Pearce
- 2009 Seth Kunin
- 2008 Philip Alexander
- 2007 Michael Berkowitz
- 2006 Geoffrey Khan
- 2005 Isabel Wollaston
- 2004 Joanna Weinberg
- 2003 Charles Thomas Robert Hayward
- 2002 Tony Kushner
- 2001 Ada Rapaport-Albert
- 2000 Avihai Shivtiel
- 1999 George J. Brooke
- 1998 Raphael Loewe
- 1997 John Klier
- 1996 William Horbury
- 1995 Martin Goodman
- 1994 Norman Solomon
- 1993 Bernard Jackson
- 1992 Stefan Reif
- 1991 Tessa Rajak
- 1990 A. Peter Hayman
- 1989 Nicholas de Lange
- 1988 Geza Vermes
- 1987 Philip Alexander
- 1985 John F.A. Sawyer
- 1984 David Patterson
- 1983 Chimen Abramsky
- 1982 Benedikt Isserlin
- 1981 Louis Jacobs
- 1980 Judah Segal
- 1979 E.J. Wiesenberg
- 1978 James Barr
- 1977 Erwin Rosenthal
- 1976 Jacob Weingreen
- 1975 Geza Vermes

== Membership ==
Membership in the BAJS is open to:

- Scholars concerned with the field of Jewish Studies.
- Graduate students in the field of Jewish Studies.
- People outside of the United Kingdom with a “serious academic interest” in the field of Jewish Studies.
- People within the United Kingdom and Ireland with a “serious academic interest in the field of Jewish Studies, but who are not professionals in the subject.

The first group, also known as “ordinary members,” are given voting rights at the association's meetings, as well as eligibility for committee membership and office positions. The last two groups are not allowed voting rights, but are allowed to attend conferences.

An application for membership must include the names of two references, at least one of whom must be an ordinary member of BAJS. The Committee considers the applications, then they are voted on at the annual general meeting.

Subscription fees or dues are also decided on at the annual general meeting.

== See also ==
- British Association for Japanese Studies
- Association for Jewish Studies, learned society in the United States
