= 23rd Street (Manhattan) =

West-east street in Manhattan, New York

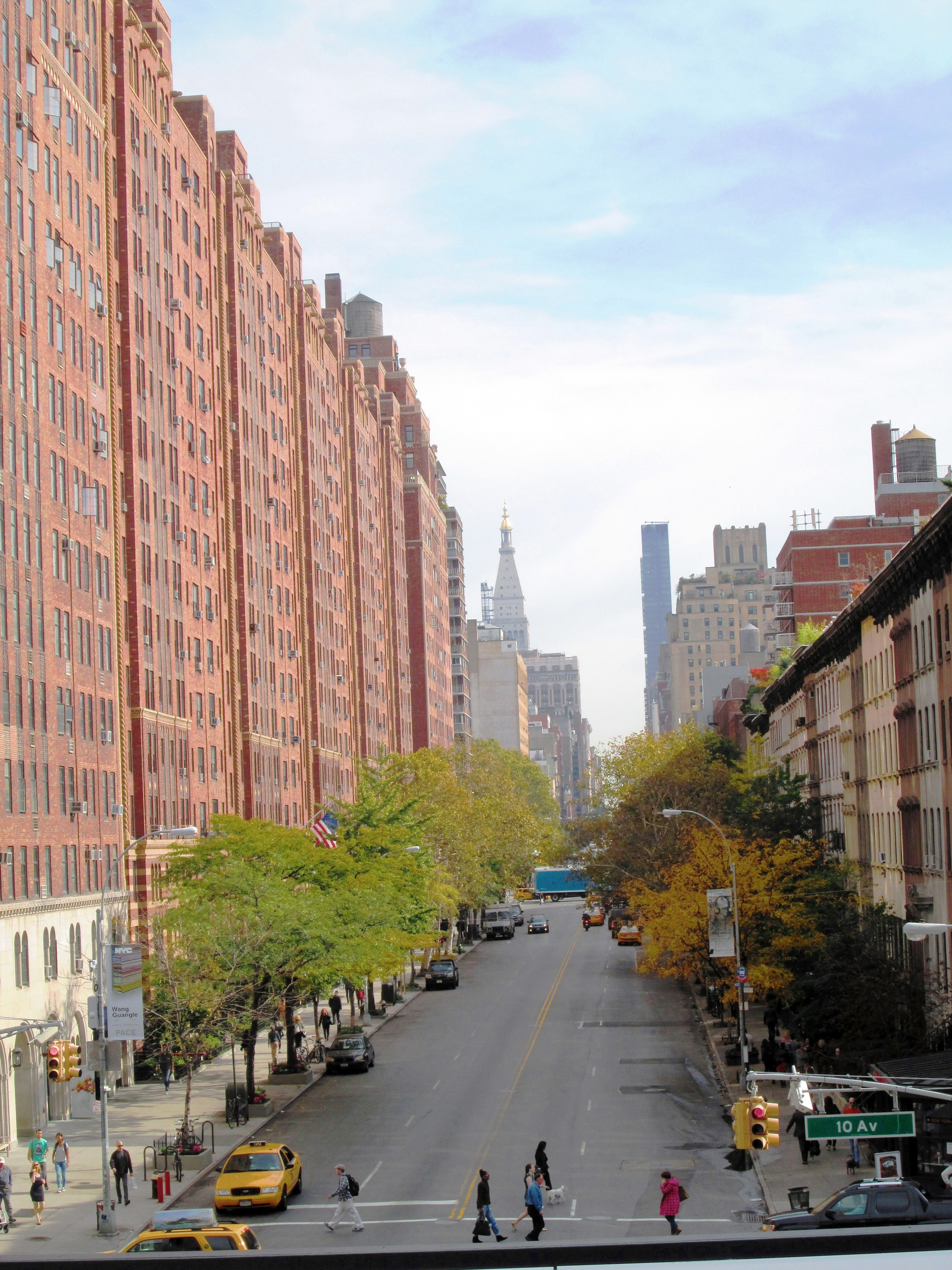
- West 23rd Street from the High Line (2014)
- Maintained by: NYCDOT
- Length: 1.9 mi (3.1 km)
- Location: Manhattan, New York City
- Postal code: 10011, 10010
- Coordinates: 40.7421°N 73.9911°W
- West end: Eleventh Avenue in Chelsea
- East end: FDR Drive / Avenue C in Kips Bay / Peter Cooper Village
- North: 24th Street
- South: 22nd Street

Construction
- Commissioned: March 1811

23rd Street is a broad thoroughfare in the New York City borough of Manhattan, one of the major two-way, east-west streets in the borough's grid. As with Manhattan's other "crosstown" streets, it is divided into its east and west sections at Fifth Avenue. The street runs from Avenue C and FDR Drive in the east to Eleventh Avenue in the west.

23rd Street was created under the Commissioners' Plan of 1811. The street hosts several famous hotels, including the Fifth Avenue Hotel and Hotel Chelsea, as well as many theaters. Several skyscrapers are located on 23rd Street, including the Flatiron Building, the Metropolitan Life Insurance Company Tower, and One Madison.

== Description ==
As with other numbered streets in Manhattan, Fifth Avenue separates West and East 23rd Street. This intersection occurs in Madison Square, near Madison Square Park, both of which are part of the Flatiron District. West of Sixth Avenue, West 23rd Street passes through Chelsea. East of Lexington Avenue, East 23rd Street runs along the southern boundary of Kips Bay and the northern boundaries of Gramercy and Peter Cooper Village.

Since 1999, an area north of 23rd Street around the park has been referred to as NoMad.

=== West 23rd Street ===
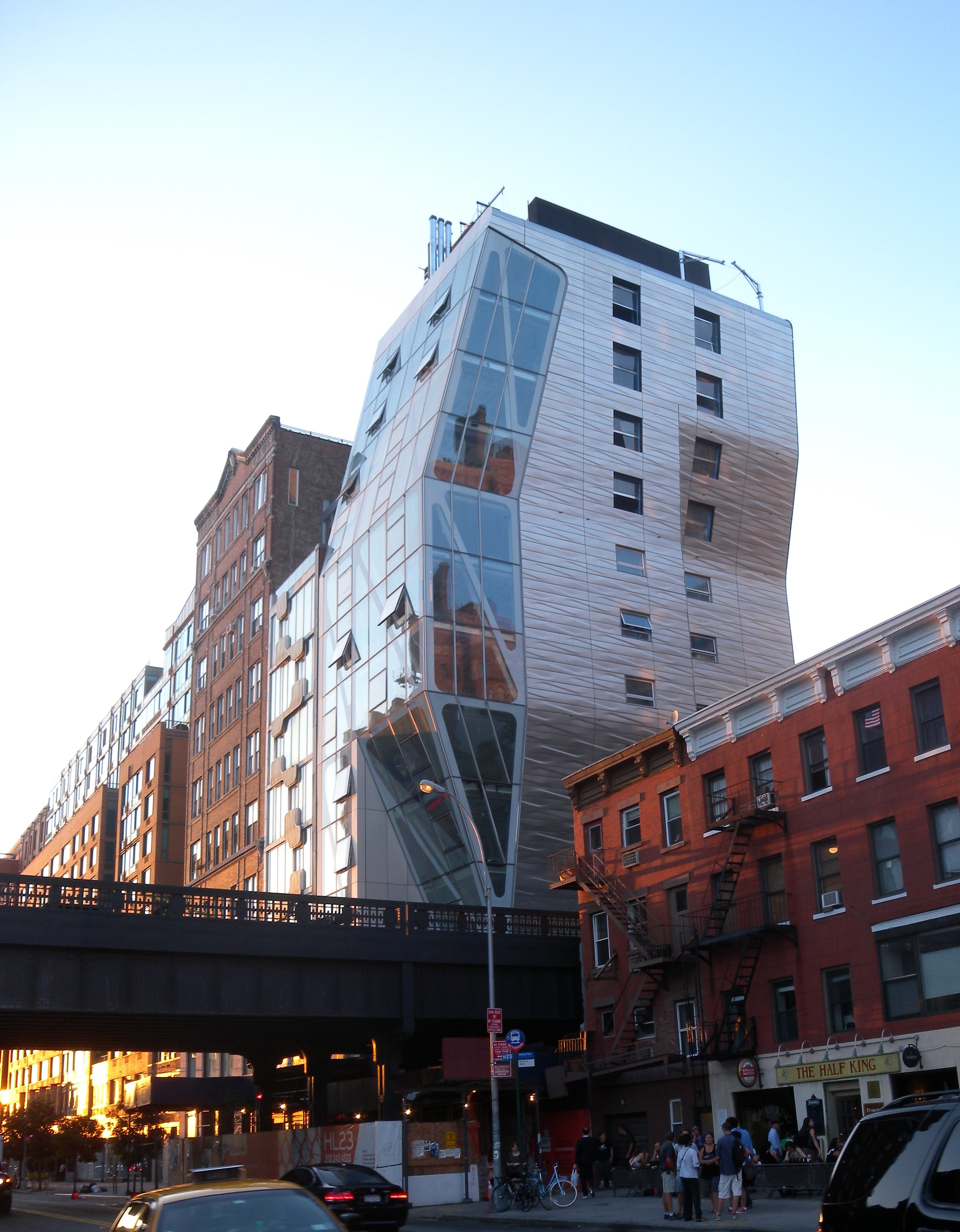
The HL23 building overhanging the High Line park

West 23rd Street, which runs through the heart of Chelsea, contains many art galleries and several theaters. For much of the late 19th century and early 20th century its western end was the site of the Pavonia Ferry at Pier 63, just north of the current Chelsea Piers.

In 1907, a small lot of land on the north side of 23rd Street, between Twelfth and Eleventh Avenues, was acquired by the Commissioner of Docks and Ferries. The land was transferred to the New York City Department of Parks and Recreation in 1915, becoming a public park called the Thomas F. Smith Park, later the Chelsea Waterside Park. In 2000, the westernmost block of 23rd Street was demolished as part of a reorganization of traffic patterns and an expansion of the park. The expanded 2.5-acre (1.0 ha) park contains a dog run, children's playground, basketball court, and soccer green.

Just west of Tenth Avenue, the street passes under the High Line, a 1.45-mile (2.33 km) elevated linear park built on the structure of the former West Side Line railroad. The High Line contains both a staircase and an elevator entrance from 23rd Street.

On the north side of 23rd Street, just west of the High Line, is "HL23", a residential building that hangs over the narrow linear park. London Terrace is located across Tenth Avenue, occupying the full block to Ninth Avenue between 23rd and 24th Streets.

The Hotel Chelsea, New York City's first co-op apartment complex, was built at 222 West 23rd Street in 1883. The Emunah Israel synagogue, built in the 1860s as a Presbyterian church, is located a few doors to the west at 236 West 23rd.

The block of 23rd Street between Fifth and Sixth Avenues is part of the Ladies' Mile Historic District. Designated a New York City landmark in May 1989, it is an irregularly shaped district consisting of 440 buildings on 28 blocks and parts of blocks, from roughly 15th Street to 24th Street and from Park Avenue South to west of Sixth Avenue.

=== East 23rd Street ===
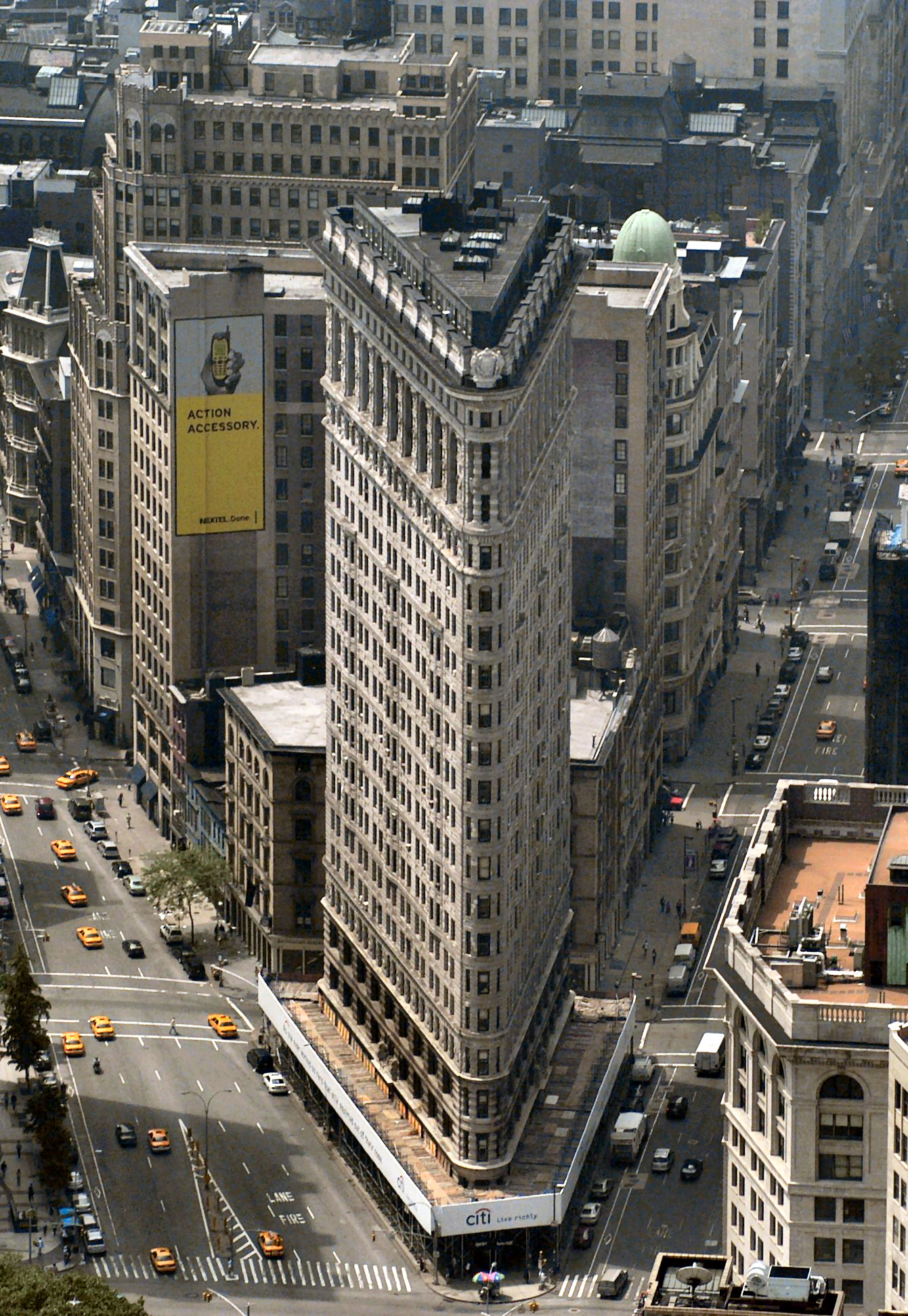
The famous Flatiron Building sits on the intersection of 23rd Street (front), Broadway (left), and 5th Avenue (right)

East 23rd Street, which runs between Fifth Avenue and the East River (FDR Drive), is one of the main thoroughfares of Gramercy Park.

The 22-story Flatiron Building is located on the south side of East 23rd Street at the street's intersection with Fifth Avenue and Broadway, occupying the triangular parcel bounded by these two avenues and 22nd Street. The origin of the term "23 skidoo" is said to be from wind gusts caused by the building's triangular shape or hot air from a shaft through which immense volumes of air escaped, producing gusts that supposedly lifted women's skirts.

The Metropolitan Life Insurance Company (MetLife), headquartered at 1 Madison Avenue at East 23rd Street, played a significant role in shaping the character of development along East 23rd Street in the early 20th century, constructing six buildings successively along the street and around the block to the corner of 24th. The tallest of these is the 700-foot (210 m) Metropolitan Life Insurance Company Tower, built in 1909 at the intersection of 24th Street and Madison Avenue. The tower, with its ornate clocktower faces, was one of Manhattan's first skyscrapers. For four years, until the construction of the Woolworth Building in 1913, it was the tallest building in the world. It also owned a building across the street, which was the location of the 23rd Street Fire that killed 12 firemen. A new apartment building, the current Madison Green, was announced for the site in the 1970s, but the building itself was not constructed until 1982.

Another skyscraper on the street, the sixty-story, 618-foot-tall (188 m) One Madison, was built in 2013. Media mogul Rupert Murdoch bought One Madison's top four floors for $57 million.

The Woman's Press Club of New York City was located at 126 East 23rd Street. It existed from 1889 to 1980 as an organization for female journalists and authors.

On the block between First and Second Avenues, the north side of the street is occupied by East Midtown Plaza, a co-op apartment complex that part of the redevelopment resulting from the Bellevue South Urban Renewal Project in the late 1960s. The northeast corner of the intersection with First Avenue is occupied by 400 First Avenue, which was built in the 1930s for the Institute for the Crippled and Disabled. To its east is a large hospital run by the Veterans Health Administration, the Margaret Cochran Corbin Campus of the VA New York Harbor Healthcare System.

Near 23rd Street's eastern end is the Asser Levy Public Baths. Built at the beginning of the 20th century, the baths were named after Asser Levy, one of the city's first Jewish settlers. In 1980, the baths were added to the National Register of Historic Places.

On the south side of East 23rd between First Avenue and Avenue C, Peter Cooper Village was one of MetLife's experiments in middle-income community building until it was bought by Tishman Speyer. Peter Cooper Village was a sister project to MetLife's Stuyvesant Town, which was built across 20th Street to the south.

Stuyvesant Cove Park is located across FDR Drive, along the East River coast. Stretching south to 18th Street, the 2-acre (0.81 ha) public space is built on the site of a concrete plant and parking lot. The street ends at the New York Skyports Seaplane Base, which opened in 1962. The seaplane base, which is part of a marina, also contains a parking lot whose entrance and exit is located at the eastern end of 23rd Street.

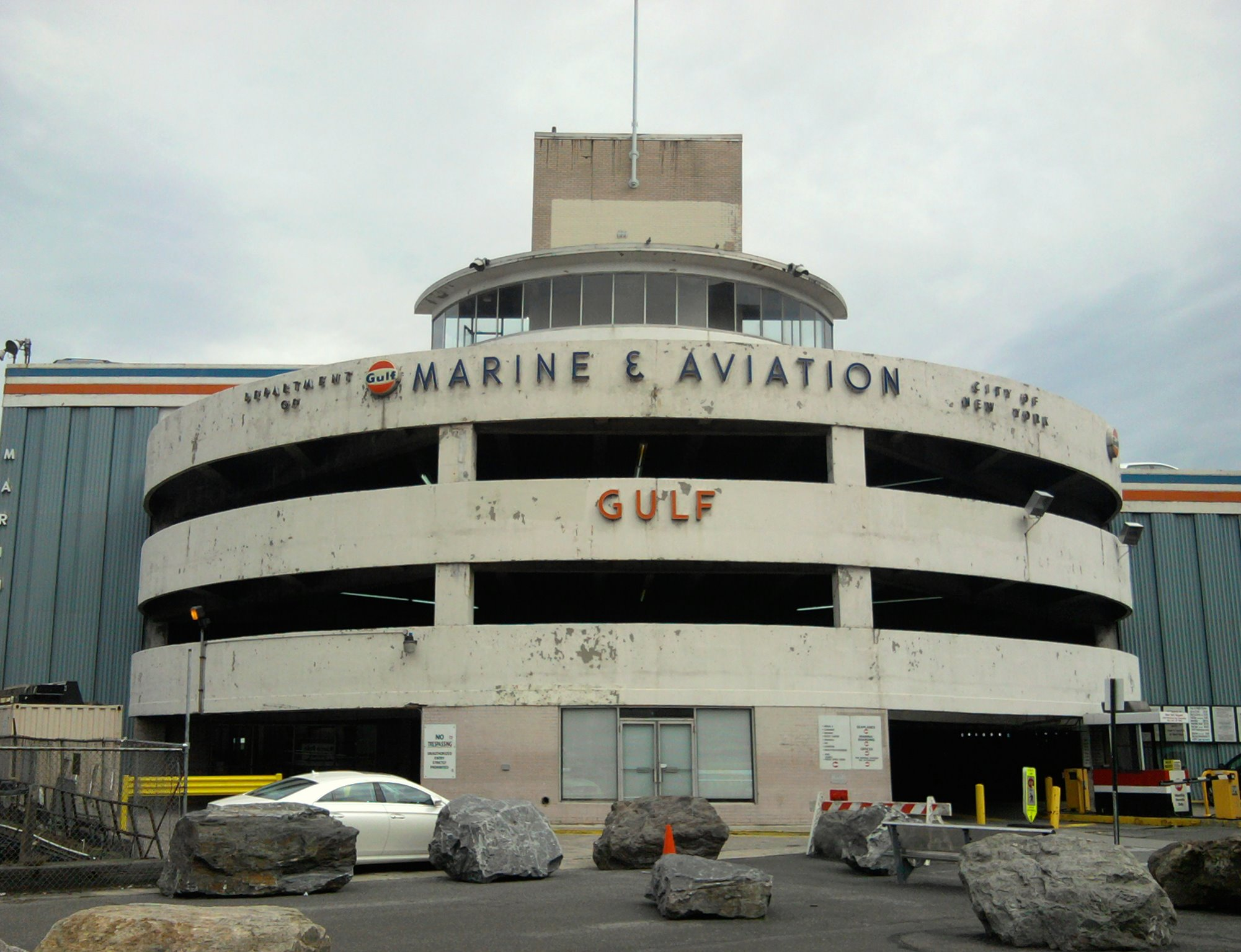
The east end of the street, the East River. The New York Skyports Seaplane Base is the last building on the east end of 23rd.

Hot air gusts and a woman's skirt flairs up, a possible origin of the expression "23 skidoo". (c.1901)

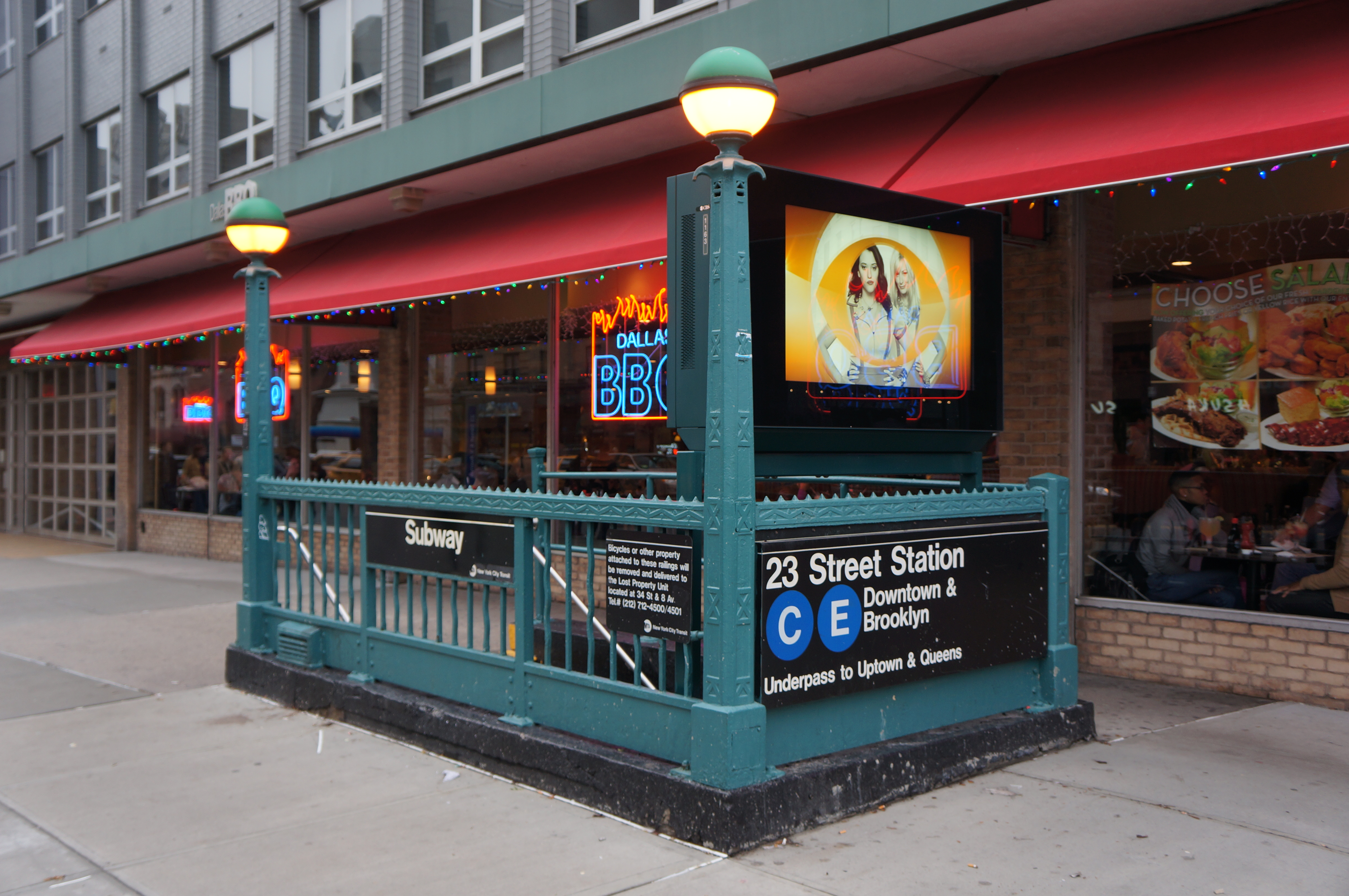
Street staircase to the 23rd Street and Eighth Avenue station

== History ==
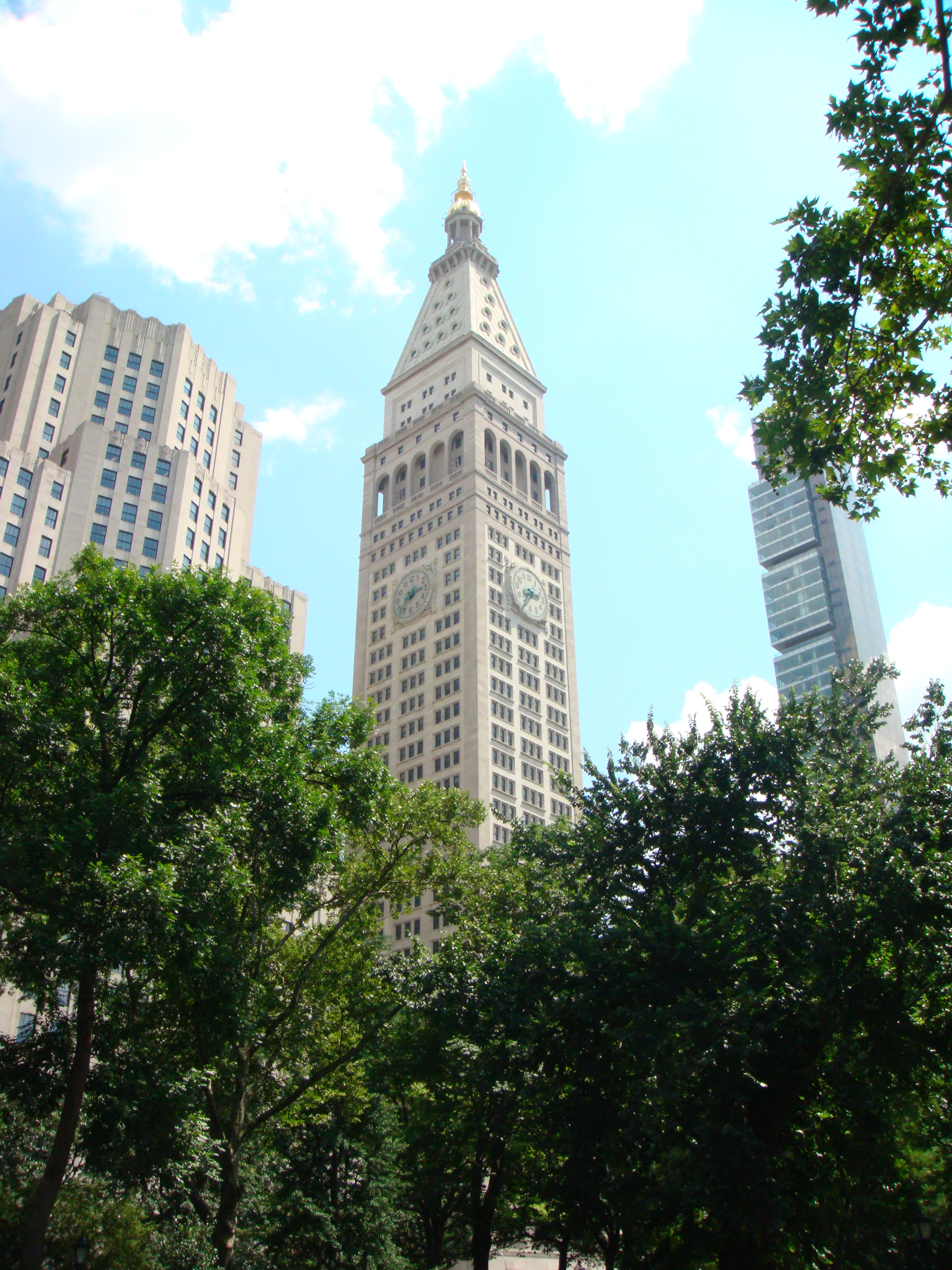
Metropolitan Life Insurance Company Tower

23rd Street was designated in the Commissioners' Plan of 1811, which established the Manhattan street grid, as one of 15 east-west streets that would be 100 feet (30 m) in width, as opposed to minor side streets that were designated as 60 feet (18 m) in width. The plan also reserved the 240 acres (97 ha) of land bounded by 23rd Street, Third Avenue, 33rd Street and Seventh Avenue as the "Grand Parade", an area upon which development was prohibited. Instead, the area was to be used as an open space for military training, as well as an assembly point in the event the city was invaded. At the time, some thought that the Grand Parade might become a "central park" for the city, but the grounds were gradually reduced over the course of time. By 1847, the open area was 7 acres (2.8 ha), comprising the land of the current Madison Square Park.

23rd St east from Sixth Avenue, New York, about 1913

=== Transport infrastructure ===
By the middle of the 19th century, there was a railroad, the Hudson (later West Side) Line, running from the current Hudson Yards area between 30th and 32nd Streets south to Chambers Street. At the time, the city prohibited steam locomotives from operating below 30th Street because of the risk of the train's steam boiler exploding, so passengers from points north were forced to switch to horse-drawn trains. The horse-drawn line's stops were located at 23rd, 14th, Christopher and Chambers Streets.

The West Side Line caused so many accidents between freight trains and other traffic that the nickname "Death Avenue" was given to Tenth and Eleventh Avenues. In 1929 the city, the state, and New York Central agreed on the West Side Improvement Project, a 13-mile (21 km) project that eliminated 105 street-level railroad crossings and cost more than US$150 million (about US$2.812500×10^{9} today). A viaduct, the High Line, replaced the street-level tracks and was dedicated on June 29, 1934. The growth of interstate trucking during the 1950s led to a drop in rail traffic throughout the United States, and the viaduct was effectively abandoned in 1980.

The Twenty-third Street Railway, a street railway originally operated as horse cars and later electric traction, was chartered on January 29, 1872. In 1893, the Twenty-third Street Railway was leased to the Houston, West Street and Pavonia Ferry Railroad, which in turn was consolidated into the Metropolitan Street Railway on December 12, 1893. The Metropolitan Street Railway was leased by the Interurban Street Railway on April 1, 1902, and the latter went bankrupt six years later. The Metropolitan Street Railway separated on July 31, 1908, becoming the 23rd Street crosstown bus route. Originally called the M18-15 and then the M26, the route was renamed the M23 in 1989.

During the 1870s, the Sixth Avenue Elevated was built, significantly increasing the number of customers who shopped at stores along the route. Elevated lines with stations on 23rd Street were also constructed along Ninth Avenue in 1867, Third Avenue in 1878, and Second Avenue in 1880. By the middle of the 20th century, they were all demolished. Several New York City Subway stations now serve 23rd Street (see § Public transit).

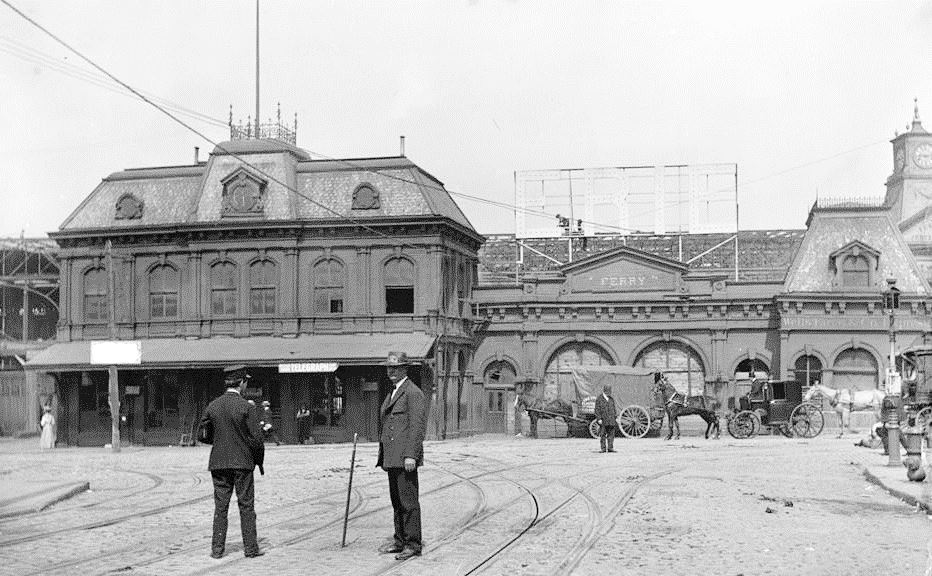
The 23rd Street Ferry Terminal at the western end of the street in 1900

In 1869, Pavonia Ferry opened a terminal on the shore of the Hudson River at Pier 63, which aligned with the western end of 23rd Street. The ferries traveled to Jersey City, located opposite Manhattan. By the beginning of the 20th century, ferries were already aging and deteriorating under heavy use, and in 1942 the terminal itself was demolished. In the late 1980s, boat enthusiast John Krevey converted an old railroad barge on the Hudson River to a floating jetty called Pier 63. A restaurant was opened on the pier. The lightship Frying Pan and the fire vessel John J. Harvey were also originally moored to Pier 63, with both listed on the National Register of Historic Places. In 2007, the barge was moved to Pier 66 on 26th Street.

=== Historical architecture ===
On January 1, 1825, the New York House of Refuge, a jail for juvenile delinquents, opened on Broadway between 22nd and 23rd Streets. The jail housed prisoners up to 16 years old who were serving long jail sentences, including boys who were being imprisoned until at least age 21 and girls until at least age 18. During the first 10 years, the jail held 1,120 prisoners. In 1854, the prison moved to Randall's Island in the East River.

A collection of four-story houses called London Terrace was built on the block bounded by 23rd Street, 24th Streets, Ninth Avenue, and Tenth Avenue in 1845. London Terrace was rebuilt in 1930, with the houses being replaced with 14 apartment buildings that each had sixteen to eighteen floors. The new complex had a total of 1,670 apartments, housing 5,000 total residents. At the time of construction it was the largest residential complex in the city.

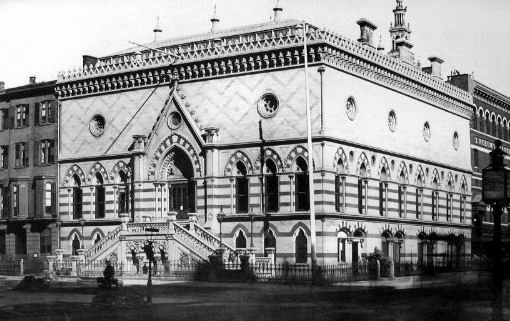
The former building of the National Academy Museum and School at the intersection of Park Avenue and 23rd Street in 1894

In 1857, the merchant Amos Eno bought a land parcel at the intersection with Fifth Avenue and 23rd Street. He built the luxury Fifth Avenue Hotel on this site by 1859. The six-story-high structure, which was designed to accommodate 800 guests, became the largest hotel in the world at that time. The hotel served as the headquarters of the Republican Party and was used by Presidents Ulysses S. Grant and Chester A. Arthur. When the Prince of Wales, Edward VII, visited the hotel in 1860, the commercial appeal of the adjacent neighborhood was greatly increased. The area bounded by 14th and 23rd Streets between Sixth Avenue and Broadway was soon dubbed Ladies' Mile. In 1908, the hotel was demolished and replaced by the Toy Center.

By about 1860, Irish immigrants had displaced African-Americans living in Five Points, the latter of whom later resettled all over Manhattan. A thousand African-Americans eventually settled in an area bordered by 23rd Street on the south, 40th Street on the north, and Sixth Avenue on the east.

The National Academy of Design building opened in 1863 at the intersection of 23rd Street and Fourth (now Park) Avenue. The building was designed by Peter Bonnett Wight in a style evocative of Doge's Palace in Venice. However, by the beginning of the 20th century, it had been demolished and replaced with the Metropolitan Life Insurance Company Tower.

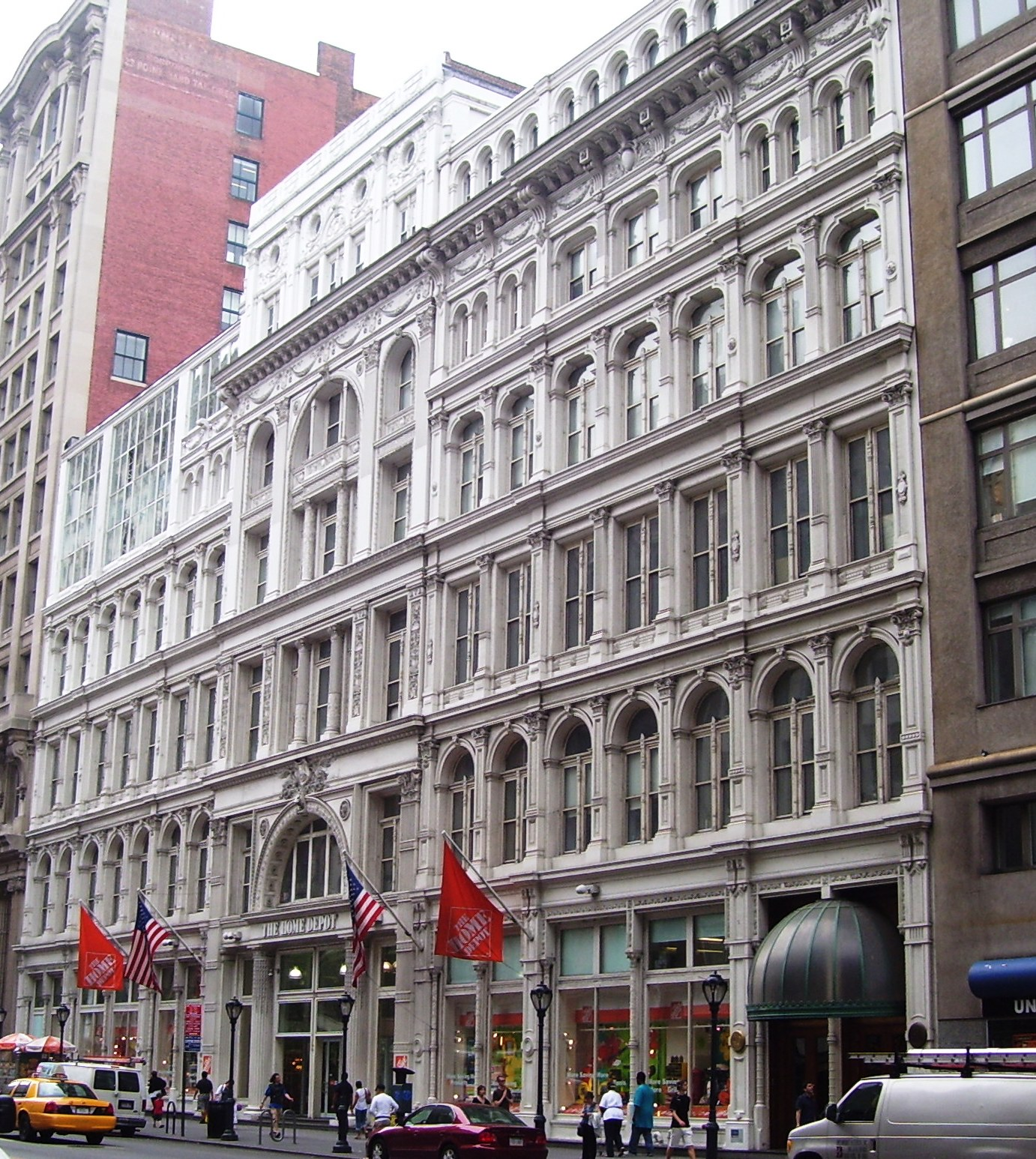
Former Stern Brothers department store

In 1878, the Stern Brothers department store opened between Fifth and Sixth Avenues. The building, designed by Henry Fernbach, was massive by contemporary standards, standing seven stories high and measuring 200 feet (61 m) wide. It became one of the largest cast-iron structures in New York City.

A second notable hotel on the street, the Hotel Chelsea, was built between 1883 and 1885, with the first portions opening in 1884. It was New York's tallest building until 1902. Sid Vicious and Nancy Spungen lived in the Hotel Chelsea from August 1978. The building has been a designated New York City landmark since 1966, and on the National Register of Historic Places since 1977.

The emergence of many new hotels after the American Civil War contributed to the increase of prostitution in the area. By 1876, there were so many brothels in the area bounded by 23rd and 57th Streets, between Fifth and Seventh Avenues, that New York City Police Department captain Alexander S. Williams nicknamed this strip of land "Tenderloin". Referring to the increased number of bribes he would receive for police protection of both legitimate and illegitimate businesses there – especially the many brothels – Williams said, "I've been having chuck steak ever since I've been on the force, and now I'm going to have a bit of tenderloin."

=== Theaters ===
There were several Broadway and Off-Broadway theaters being built along West 23rd Street beginning in the late 19th century. By the turn of the century, the street contained a "Theater Row", which was a prominent fixture in American theater. 23rd Street remained New York's main theater strip until the Empire Theatre opened on Broadway some twenty blocks uptown, ushering in a new era of theater.

In 1868, Pike's Opera House (later the Grand Opera House) was built at Eighth Avenue and 23rd Street for several million dollars. The film company RKO Pictures converted the building into a movie theater in 1938. By 1960, it was demolished to make room for the Penn South residential complex.

Booth's Theatre was opened in 1869 at the intersection with Sixth Avenue. It was sold in 1881 for half the cost of its construction, becoming a dry-goods store.

In 1889, the entrepreneur Frederick Freeman Proctor opened Proctor's Theatre, a theater between Sixth and Seventh Avenues. Proctor used innovations such as electric lighting and phonographs in his "continuous daily vaudeville" theater. In 1907, the theater was converted to an RKO cinema, and 30 years later, it was destroyed in a fire. During the late 19th century, Bryant's Minstrels also performed a minstrel show in Proctor's Theatre.

Modern theaters include the Chelsea Bow Tie Cinemas, on the south side of West 23rd between Seventh and Eighth Avenues; the SVA Theatre, operated by the School of Visual Arts on the north side of West 23rd one block west; and the Cell Theatre, across the street from the SVA Theatre.

The historical theaters of 23rd Street

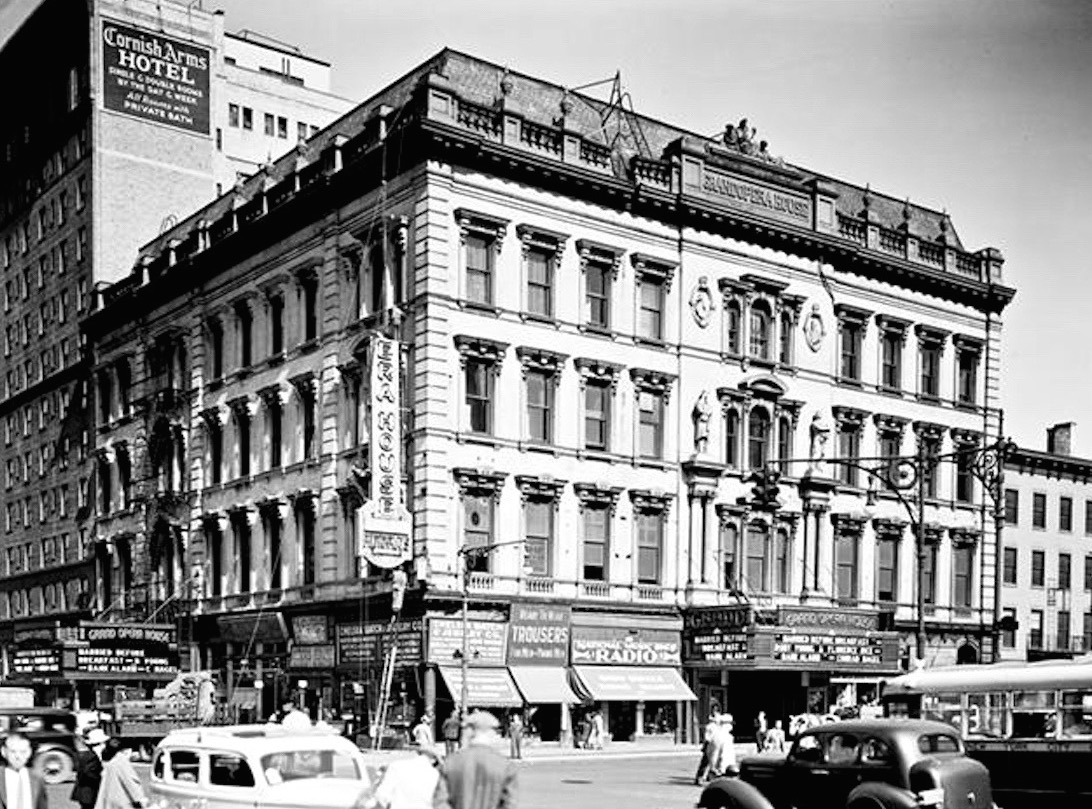
Grand Opera House in 1937

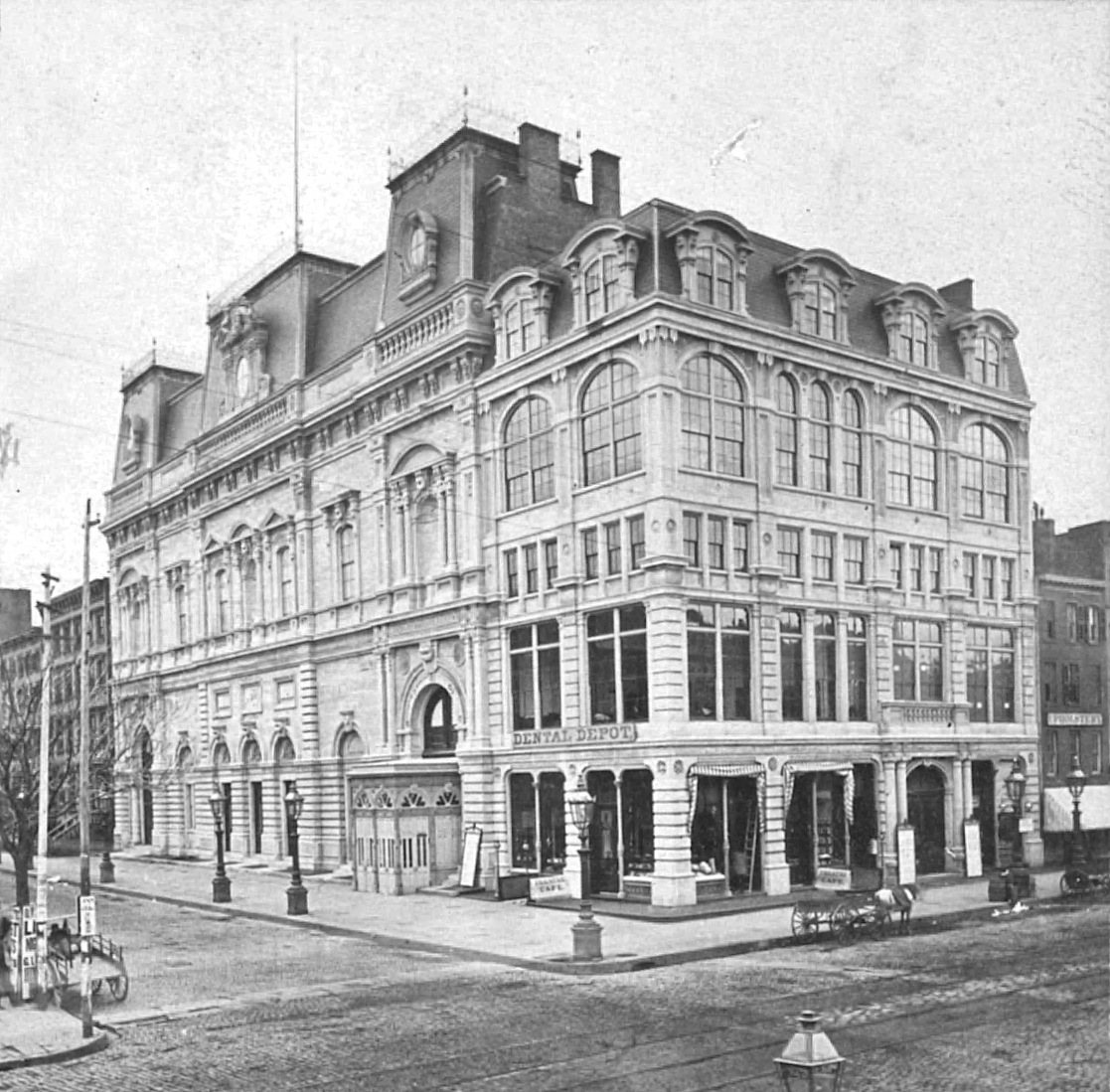
Booth's Theatre

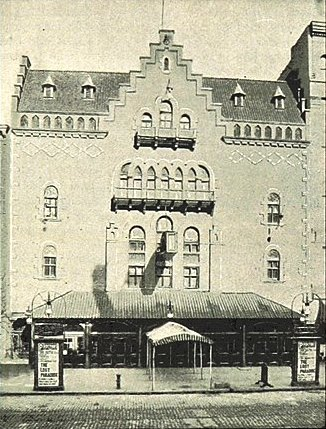
Proctor's Theatre in 1893

=== Educational institutions ===
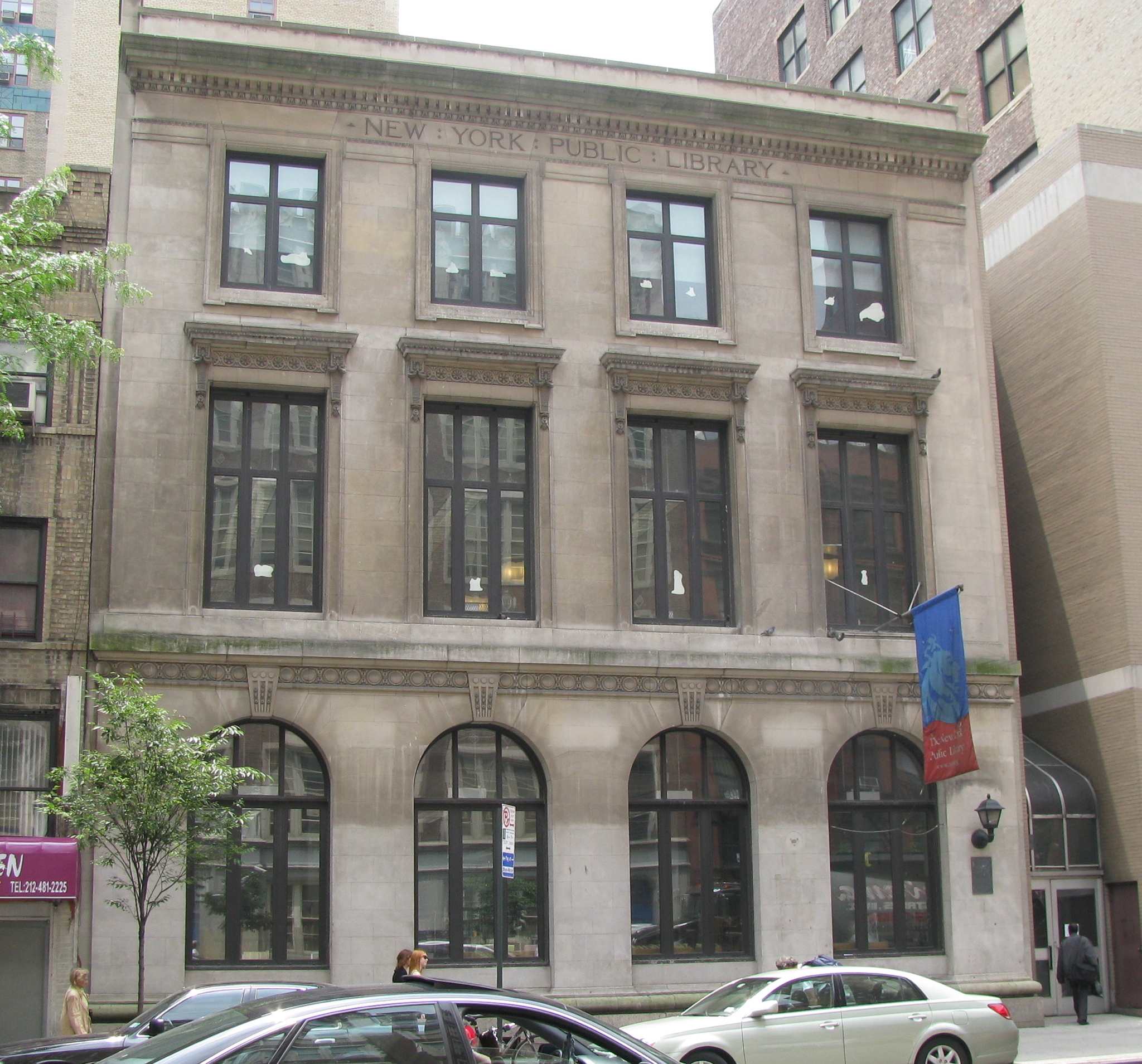
The New York Public Library's Epiphany branch on East 23rd Street

In 1849, James Renwick Jr. constructed the Free Academy Building for the City College of New York, following a statewide referendum two years prior that had allowed the construction of the school. The Gothic Revival building was located at the intersection of Lexington Avenue and 23rd Street. The building was demolished in 1928.

Baruch College, an institution within the City University of New York system, was a successor to the Free Academy. Founded by businessman and City College alumnus Bernard Baruch, the campus includes the Lawrence and Eris Field Building at the southeast corner of Lexington Avenue and 23rd Street in Gramercy. The 16-story building, opened in 1929, is the oldest structure that is part of Baruch College.

The New York Public Library contains two branches on the different portions of 23rd Street: the Muhlenberg branch on West 23rd Street and Seventh Avenue, and the Epiphany branch on East 23rd Street west of Second Avenue. The Epiphany branch, which is located in Gramercy/Kips Bay, opened in 1887 and moved to its current location, a Carnegie library on 23rd Street, in 1907. It was renovated from 1982 to 1984. The Muhlenberg branch, also a Carnegie library, opened in Chelsea in 1906 and was renovated in 2000.

=== Incidents ===
On October 17, 1966, the street was the location of New York's deadliest fire until the September 11 attacks, in terms of firefighters killed. The "23rd Street Fire", as it came to be called, began in a cellar at 7 East 22nd Street and soon spread to the basement of 6 East 23rd Street, a five-story commercial building that housed a drugstore at street level. Twelve firefighters were killed; two chiefs, two lieutenants, and six firefighters plunged into the flaming cellar, while two more firefighters were killed by the blast of flame and heat on the first floor. The site is now the location of Madison Green, a 31-story apartment building.

On September 17, 2016, several bombs detonated in New York and New Jersey. One of these was a pressure cooker bomb that exploded on West 23rd Street between Sixth Avenue and Seventh Avenue, injuring 31 people. A New Jersey resident, Ahmed Khan Rahimi, was later detained in connection with the bombings.

== Economy ==
23rd Street was historically one of the city's fashion hubs, and the street still contains many clothing stores. There are also several major retailers with stores located on the street, such as Best Buy and The Home Depot.

Restaurants, cafes, fast-food outlets and other eating establishments on 23rd Street are mostly oriented toward office workers, and many of these establishments provide catering services. These restaurants offer cuisine from a variety of cultures, including Thai, Italian, Spanish and French cuisine.

23rd Street contains some upper-class areas with expensive real estate. One 2,500-square-foot (230 m^{2}) office space between Park and Lexington Avenues was leased for $240,000 per year in March 2017, while a 1,000-square-foot (93 m^{2}) apartment three blocks east was being sold for $1 million. In July 2015, a four-bedroom penthouse apartment sold for $6.44 million.

== Transportation ==
=== Subway ===
Every New York City Subway line that crosses 23rd Street has a local station there:

- 23rd Street on the BMT Broadway Line serving the N, R, and W trains
- 23rd Street on the IND Eighth Avenue Line serving the C and E trains
- 23rd Street on the IND Sixth Avenue Line serving the F, <F>, and M trains
- 23rd Street on the IRT Broadway–Seventh Avenue Line serving the 1 train
- 23rd Street–Baruch College on the IRT Lexington Avenue Line serving the 6 and <6> trains

There is also a PATH station at 23rd Street and Sixth Avenue.

In the past, every former IRT elevated line had a station at 23rd Street, most of which were local stations:

- 23rd Street on the IRT Second Avenue Line
- 23rd Street on the IRT Third Avenue Line which served local and express trains
- 23rd Street on the IRT Sixth Avenue Line
- 23rd Street on the IRT Ninth Avenue Line

=== Bus ===
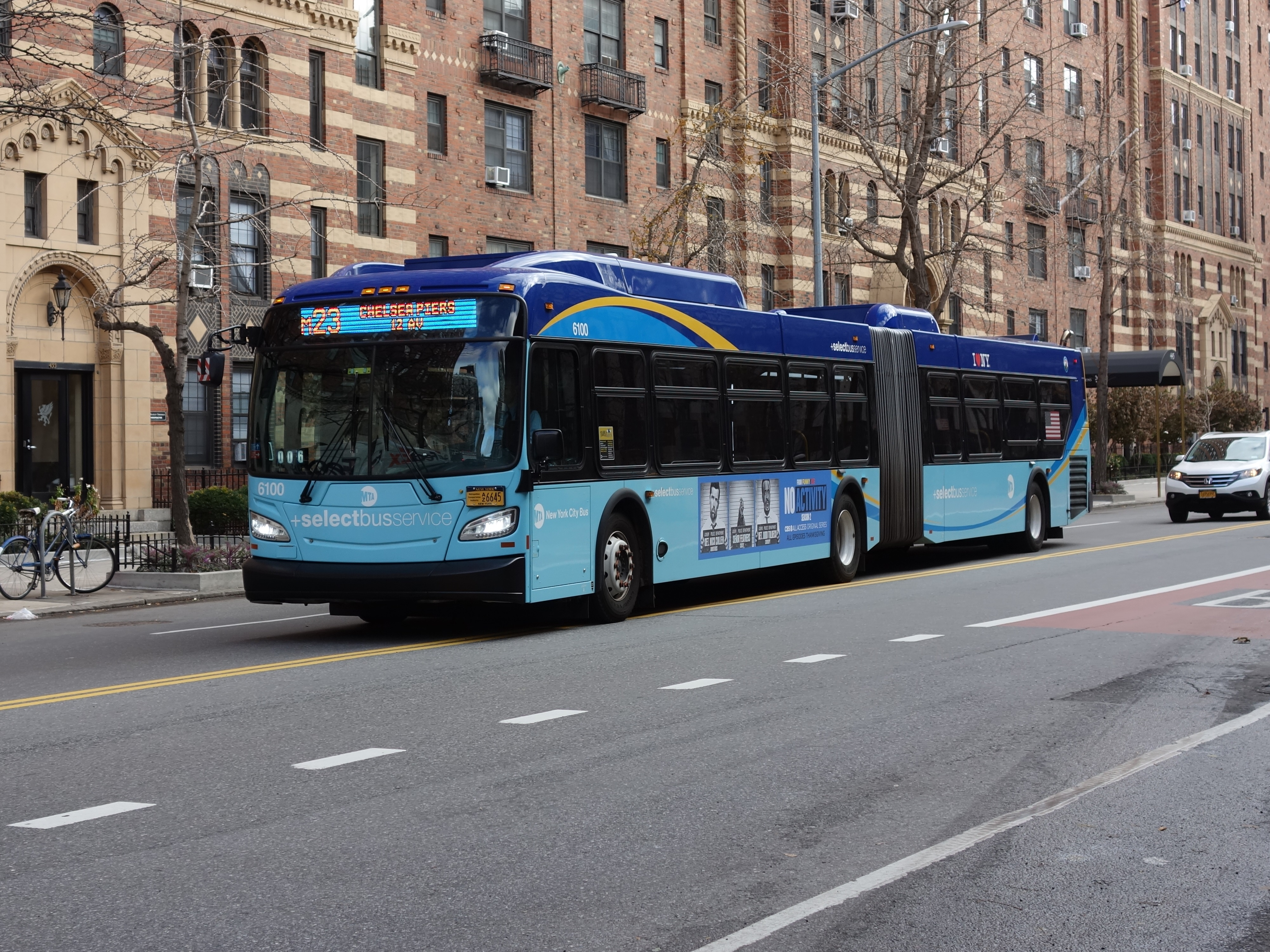
The M23 bus

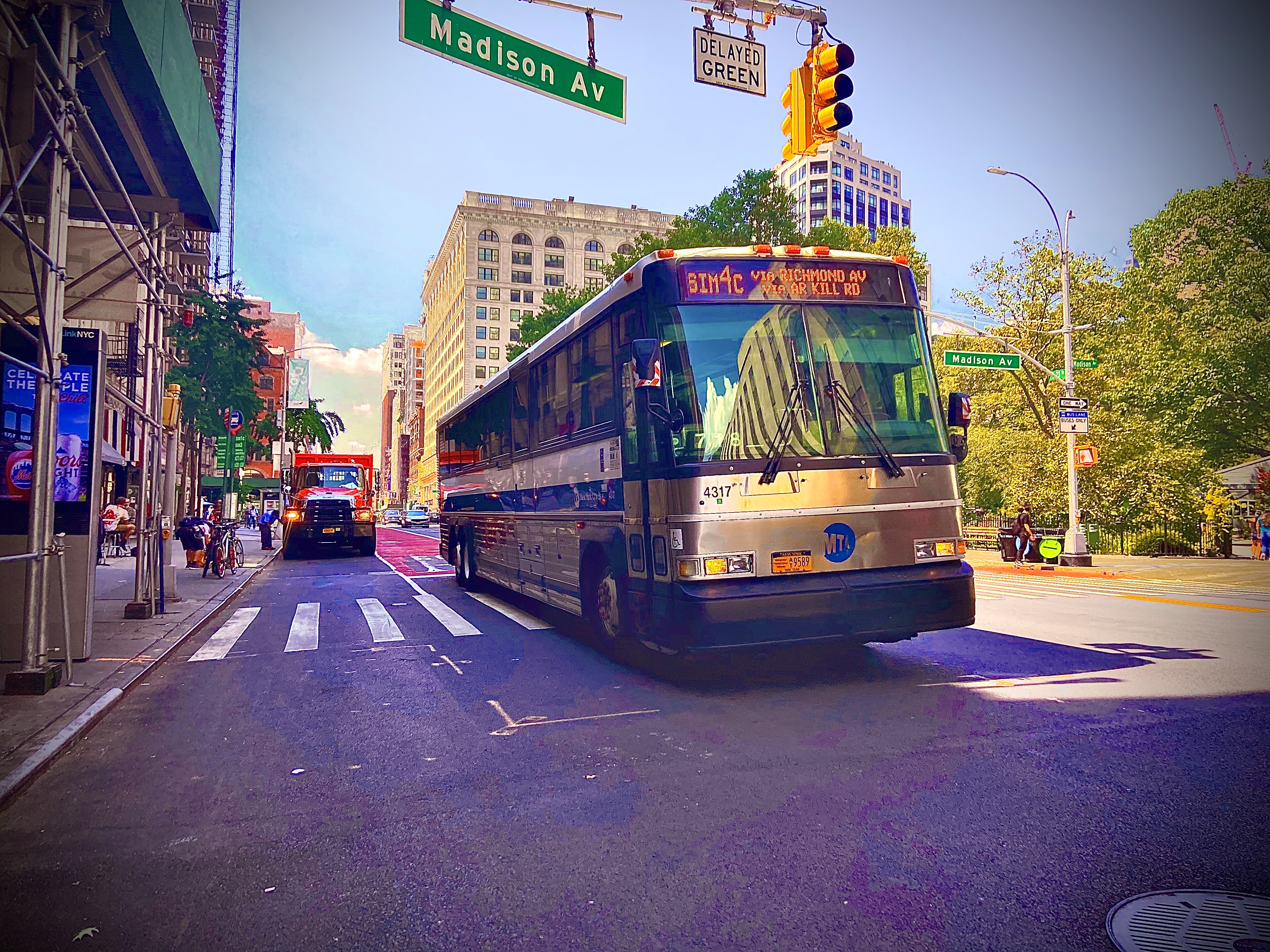
SIM4C bus on 23rd Street

MTA New York City Transit's M23 route runs the length of 23rd Street. In 2003, the Straphangers Campaign listed the M23 as one of the slowest in the city, winning its "Pokey Award" for going at an average speed of 3.7 miles per hour (6.0 km/h). In 2016 it was converted to a Select Bus Service route, with bus rapid transit components such as exclusive bus lanes and all-door bus boarding, to speed up service. Additional service is provided by the M9 and M34A SBS east of Second Avenue, both in the eastbound direction.

23rd Street at Madison Avenue is a large hub for express buses. The BxM3, BxM4, BxM6, BxM7, BxM8, BxM9, BxM10 and BxM11 and some X27 and X28 buses terminate here. In addition, the BM1, BM2, BM3, BM4, X27, X37, X28, X38, BxM18, SIM1C, SIM3C, SIM4C, SIM33C, SIM10, SIM3, SIM31, QM21, QM63, QM64 and QM68 buses run through here.

== See also ==
- List of numbered streets in Manhattan

Preceding station	Erie Railroad	Following station
Jersey City Terminus	Pavonia Ferry	Terminus
