= Madison Green (New York City) =

Residential skyscraper in Manhattan, New York

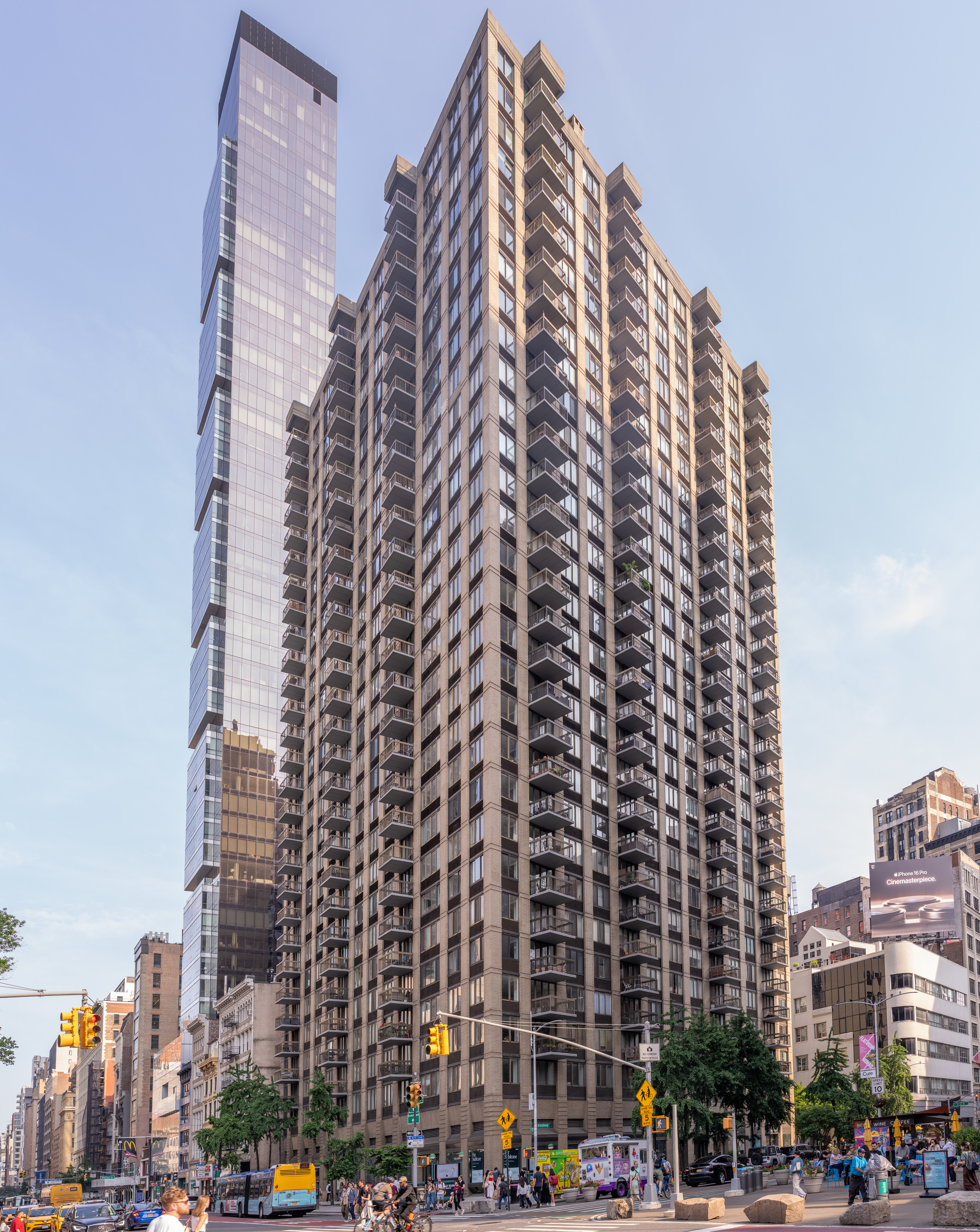
- (2025)
- Interactive map of the Madison Green area

General information
- Location: 5 East 22nd Street; Manhattan, New York City, New York
- Completed: 1982

Height
- Height: 284 feet (87 m)

Technical details
- Floor count: 30

Design and construction
- Architect: Philip Birnbaum

Madison Green is a 31-story, 424-unit condominium apartment building located on the corner of East 23rd Street and Broadway, across from Madison Square, in the Flatiron District neighborhood of Manhattan, New York City. The building's street address is 5 East 22nd Street.

The site was the location of a 5-alarm fire in October 1966 in which 12 firefighters died, the New York City Fire Department's worst loss of life before the September 11, 2001 attacks. The property was owned by the Metropolitan Life Insurance Company, which failed to find a buyer for a decade. In the mid-1970s, when the neighborhood, now known as the Flatiron District, was at its nadir, it was announced that an apartment building would be built on the site, but the building was not actually constructed until 1982, signalling a change in the area's fortunes. The building was designed by Philip Birnbaum, with interior public spaces designed by David Kenneth Spector.
