= 23rd Street Fire =

1966 major fire in New York City

- 23rd Street Fire (Lower Manhattan)
- Date: 17 October 1966
- Time: 21:36 EST (UTC–5)
- Location: 7 East 22nd Street, New York, NY; 40°44′27″N 73°59′20″W
- Cause: Unsafe storage of flammable materials
- Deaths: 12 firefighters

The 23rd Street Fire was an incident that took place in the Flatiron District neighborhood of Manhattan, New York City, on October 17, 1966. A group of firefighters from the New York City Fire Department responding to a fire at 7 East 22nd Street entered a building at 6 East 23rd Street as part of an effort to fight the fire. Twelve firefighters were killed after the floor collapsed, the largest loss of life in the department's history until the collapse of the World Trade Center in the September 11 attacks of 2001.

== Incident ==
A fire was reported at 9:36 p.m. at the American Art Galleries, an art dealer located in a four-story brownstone at 7 East 22nd Street (just off Broadway), transmitted as Box 598. An FDNY report after the incident showed that the dealer had stored highly flammable lacquer, paint, and finished wood frames in the basement. By the time the first firefighters arrived, the intensity of the smoke and heat made it impossible to enter through the 22nd Street side of the building.

Firefighters attempted to approach the burning building through Wonder Drug, a store located at 6 East 23rd Street in a five-story commercial building on a 45-by-100-foot (14 m × 30 m) lot that abutted the burning art dealership. As part of a construction project that had recently been completed, a common cellar under the two buildings was renovated, removing a load-bearing dividing wall that had supported the floor above. The removal of the wall allowed the art dealer to increase available storage space and move some of their supplies into a space that was now under the drugstore.

The building at 7 East 22nd Street had a two-story extension adjoining the rear of the building at 6 East 23rd Street. The cellar of the 22nd Street building extended about 35 feet (11 m) under the drug store. The drugstore's floor was supported by 3-by-14-inch (7.6 cm × 35.6 cm) wood beams. 3/4 inch (19 mm) wood planking atop these beams was covered with 5 inches (130 mm) of concrete finished with terrazzo. The fire underneath the store weakened the wooden beams, while the thickness of the floor prevented firefighters from feeling the extreme heat below.

A 15-by-35-foot (4.6 by 10.7 m) section of the floor collapsed at 10:39 p.m., one hour and three minutes after the initial alarm was transmitted, causing ten firefighters to fall into the burning cellar. Two other firefighters on the first floor were killed in a flashover. In all, twelve firefighters were killed: two chiefs, two lieutenants, and eight firefighters. It took firefighters 14 hours to dig out the rubble and reach their dead comrades. The dead men left behind 12 widows and 32 children. The fire raged to a fifth alarm.

== Aftermath ==
10,000 firefighters lined Fifth Avenue on October 21, 1966, as ten firetrucks carried ten coffins to separate services at St. Thomas Protestant Episcopal Church and at St. Patrick's Cathedral. Firefighters came from as far away as the U.K., Ireland, Anchorage, Los Angeles and San Francisco, the Northeast United States, and a group of 500 firefighters from Boston who had come to pay tribute.

Firefighters killed in the line of duty include:

- Deputy Chief Thomas A. Reilly, FDNY 3rd Division
- Battalion Chief Walter J. Higgins, FDNY 7th Battalion
- Lt. John J. Finley, FDNY Ladder Co. 7
- Lt. Joseph Priore, FDNY Engine Co. 18
- Firefighter John G. Berry, FDNY Ladder Co. 7
- Firefighter James V. Galanaugh, FDNY Engine Co. 18
- Firefighter Rudolph F. Kaminsky, FDNY Ladder Co. 7
- Firefighter Joseph Kelly, FDNY Engine Co. 18
- Firefighter Carl Lee, FDNY Ladder Co. 7
- Firefighter William F. McCarron, FDNY 3rd Division
- Firefighter Daniel L. Rey, FDNY Engine Co. 18
- Firefighter Bernard A. Tepper, FDNY Engine Co. 18

Today, Madison Green stands on the former site of the 23rd Street Fire.
