= Zum Gali Gali =

Israeli folk song

Zum Gali Gali (Hebrew: זום גלי גלי) is an Israeli folk song associated with kibbutzim, Israel's collective agricultural communities. The song is sometimes referred to by the title "Israeli Work Song" and is known for its rhythmic style. The song begins with the repeated refrain ("zum gali gali") before proceeding to the verses. The repeated refrain itself is a nonsensical verse, and has no direct translation into English.

== Overview ==
=== Origins ===
The exact origins and authorship of Zum Gali Gali is unknown. While the song is associated with the Kibbutz Mishmar HaEmek, it is possible that it was composed elsewhere. It may have first been performed as part of a play. The first publication of the song was in 1939 by the Hebrew Publishing Company, New York, indicating it was popular among American Jews at the time. Subsequent publications, such as a 1948 recording by Meir Lokitz, recorded as part of The Stonehill Collection: Recording of Holocaust survivors and Jewish immigrants to the United States, contains alternate verses with the standard refrain. The song was first performed in a non-Jewish context by the German instrumentalist Bert Kaempfert.

=== Usage ===
Zum Gali Gali
Melody played on piano

Zum Gali Gali is commonly used today in music education in both Jewish and non-Jewish settings on account of the song's rhythmic style, minor tonality, multicultural and diverse origin.

זוּם גַּלִּי גַּלִּי גַּלִּי
זוּם גַּלִּי גַּלִּי

הֶחָלוּץ לְמַעַן עֲבוֹדָה
עֲבוֹדָה לְמַעַן הֶחָלוּץ

וּם גַּלִּי גַּלִּי גַּלִּי
זוּם גַּלִּי גַּלִּי

𝄆 Zum gali gali gali,
zum gali gali. 𝄇

𝄆 He'chalutz lema'an avodah,
avodah lema'an he'chalutz. 𝄇

Zum gali gali gali,
zum gali gali.
