= Hebrew Publishing Company =

American Jewish publisher in New York City

Hebrew Publishing Company was an American Jewish publishing house based in New York City. The company published a range of Hebrew prayer books and other religious works, as well as many Yiddish publications. The company was founded in the early 1900s on the Lower East Side of New York and later was situated at the former Bank of United States building for over forty years. The company was described as having the greatest staying power of any Yiddish publisher.

== Overview ==
The predecessor to the Hebrew Publishing Company was originally formed in 1883 as Rosenbaum & Werbelowsky, Inc. The current company was founded in 1901 by Joseph Werbelowsky and his son David Werbelowsky. The company also operated a bookstore.

The company was founded on the Lower East Side of New York circa 1924. They were located at 50-52 Eldridge Street in 1924 and 632-34 Broadway from 1928. After the collapse of the Bank of United States in 1932, Hebrew Publishing Company took over the bank's headquarters building at 77 Delancey Street. In 1976, after over forty years at the Delancey Street location, the company moved out from its Lower East Side location.

Among their perennial publications were the prayer books edited and translated to English that the company commissioned from Paltiel (Philip) Birnbaum. These books led the New York Times to describe him as "the most obscure bestselling author."

In 1980, the company was acquired by Charles Lieber (1921–2016) from the Werbelowsky (Werbel) family. Lieber was a protégé of Alfred Knopf, had been an executive at Random House, and was the owner of textbook publisher Aldine Atherton. It has since become defunct. Hundreds of the company's publications have been digitized by the Yiddish Book Center research institute.

In its early years, the company geared its productions to newly arrived Orthodox Jewish immigrants who were fluent in Yiddish and Hebrew. The company produced books, educational textbooks, greeting cards, and sheet music. The company also offered a range of books to assist the new immigrants with integrating into American society. The first publication of the Hebrew folk song Zum Gali Gali was released by the Hebrew Publishing Company in 1939. The company is thought to be the first to publish a Yiddish-English dictionary.

== In popular culture ==
Hebrew Publishing Company was the title of an award-winning novel by the Israeli writer Matan Hermoni. In the book, the novel's protagonist, Mordechai Schuster, a newly arrived immigrant to the United States, works for his uncle at the Hebrew Publishing Company. The novel describes the lives of Jewish immigrants in Manhattan in the early 20th century as they engage in petty trade or work as laborers, living in poverty and overcrowded housing. The immigrants read the cheaply produced literature (known as shund in Yiddish) and sentimental stories published by the Hebrew Publishing Company.

== Gallery ==
Early publications by the Hebrew Publishing Company
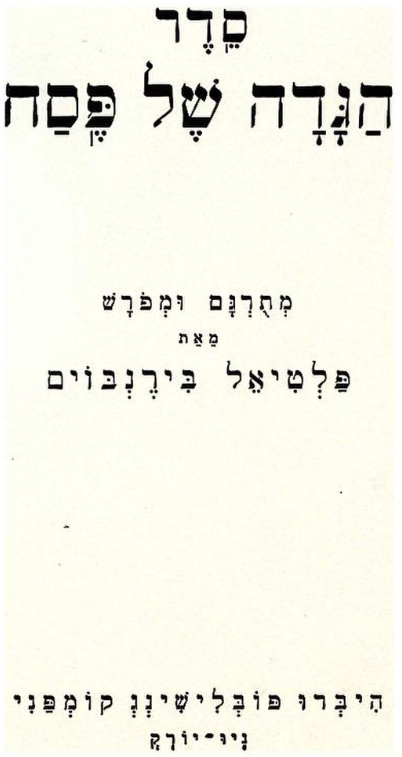
Passover Haggadah by Philip Birnbaum

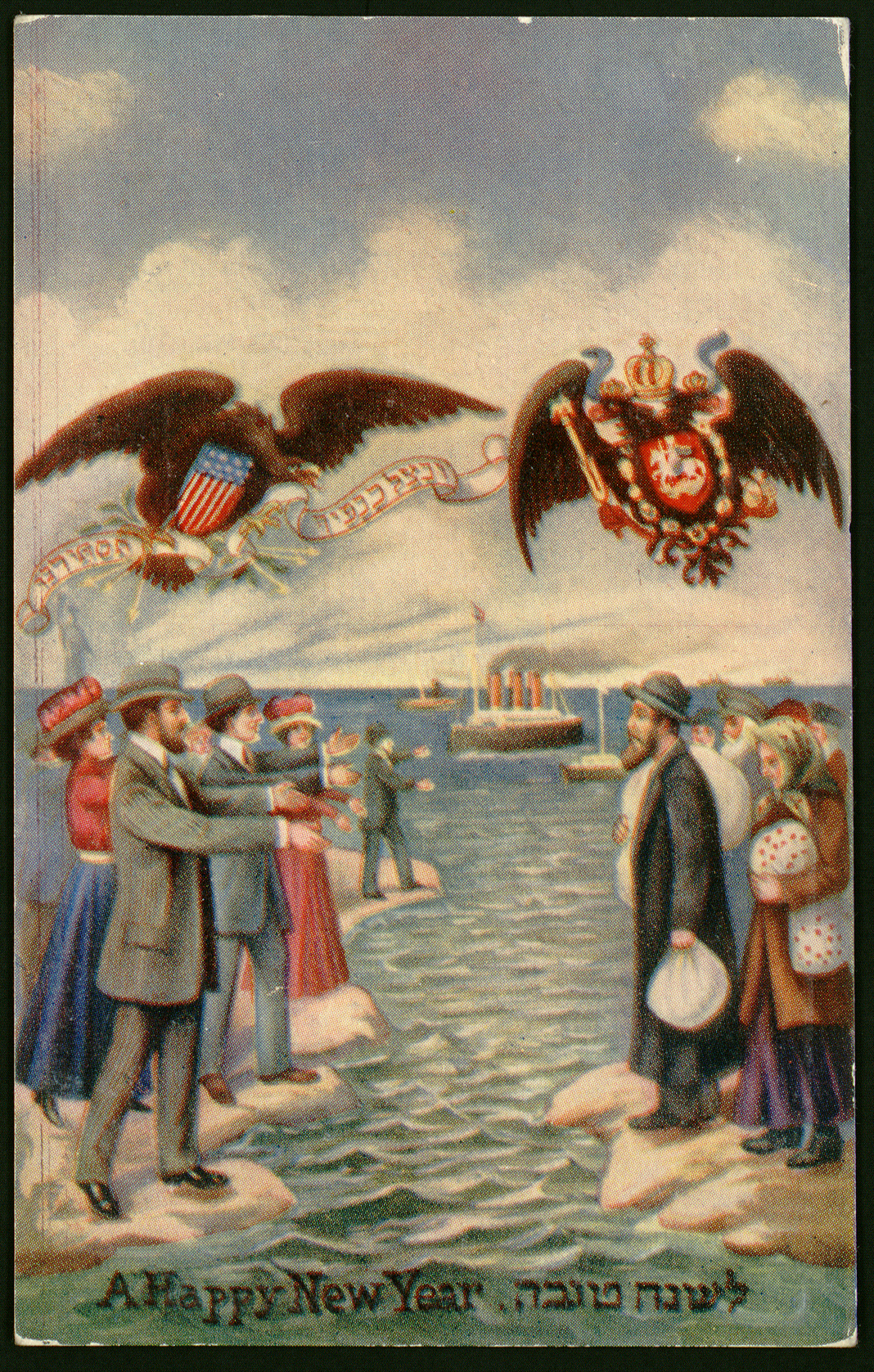
Greeting Card for the Jewish New Year

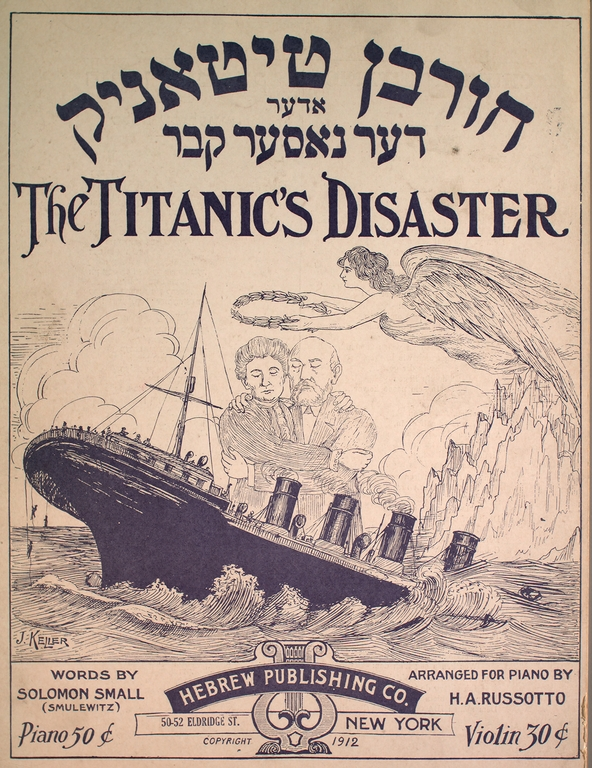
Yiddish sheet music

== See also ==
- Soncino Press
- ArtScroll
- Kehot Publication Society
