= Chambers Street Ferry Terminal =

Ferry terminal in Manhattan, New York

Coordinates: 40°43′1″N 74°0′50″W

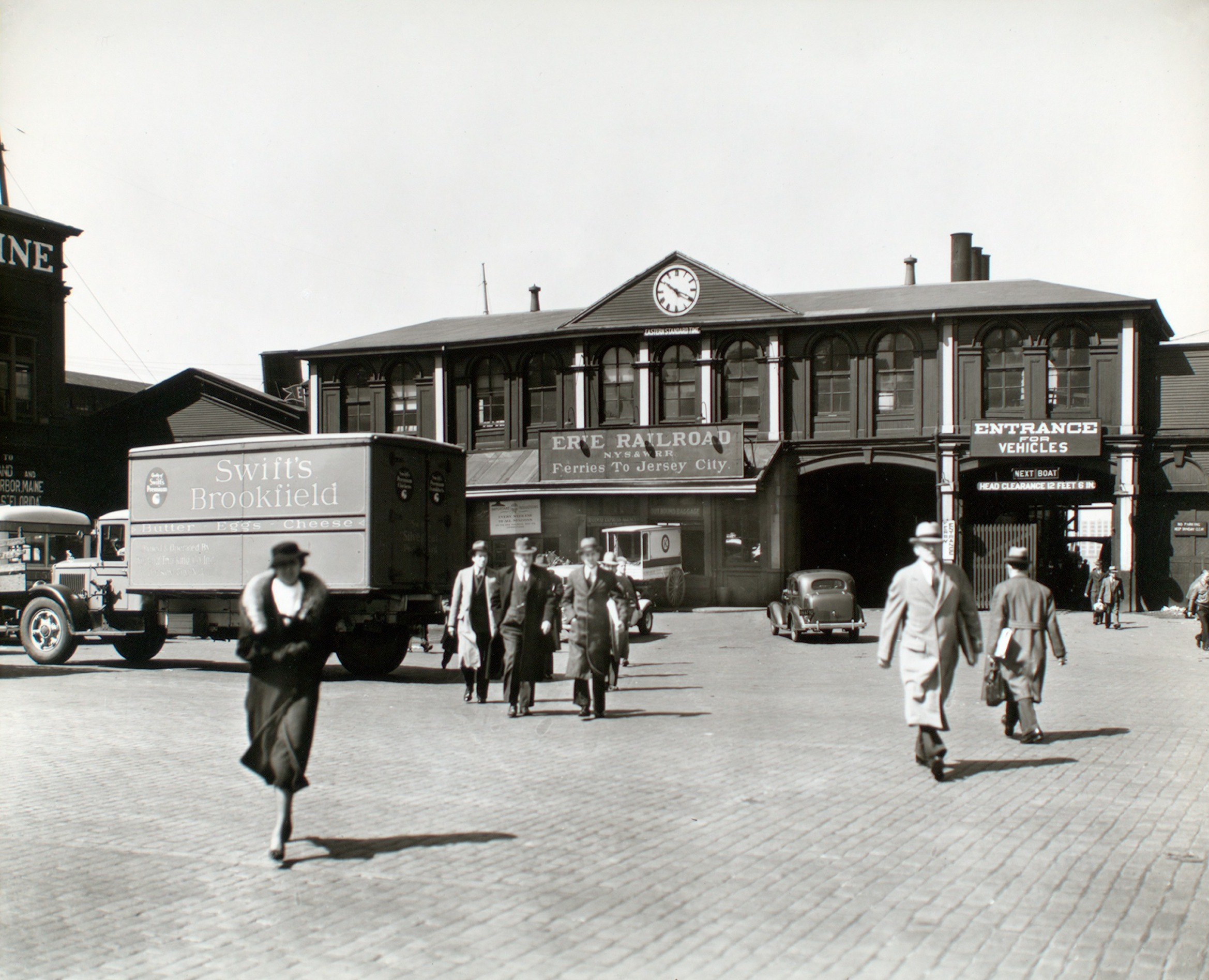
Chambers Street Ferry Terminal, 1936

The Chambers Street Ferry Terminal was the Erie Railroad's main ferry slip on Manhattan and the point of departure and embarkation for passengers in New York City. The terminal was one of several operated by ferry companies and railroads that lined the western shore of Manhattan during the 19th and 20th centuries. The Pavonia Ferry operated for over 100 years from the terminal, which was demolished about three years after the Erie Railroad stopped its ferry service to Chambers Street in December, 1958.

== History ==
The Erie Railroad's ferry service to Chambers Street began shortly after the construction of the railroad's line to Jersey City which opened in 1856. The Erie eventually would open Pavonia Terminal on the Western shore of the Hudson River and its passengers used the ferries to travel across the river.

Many streetcar systems began at the Manhattan side of the many ferries that at landed there. The Metropolitan Street Railway system began after the merger of the Chambers Street & Grand Street Ferry Railway and the Houston Street, West Street & Pavonia Ferry Railroad, on January 30, 1891. The roads were capitalized for $800,000 and $250,000 respectively, totaling a combined capital of $1,050,000.

A January 18, 1903, letter from a Passaic, New Jersey reader to The New York Times, commented about the inadequacy of the boats of the Pavonia Ferry, which was then the property of the Erie Railroad. All their boats are old, small and entirely inadequate to accommodate the crowds during rush hours. The vessels then in use by the Erie Railroad, listed with first year of service, were Pavonia (1861), Susquehanna (1865), Delaware (1868), Chatauqua (1868), Passaic (1869), Ridgewood (1873), Paterson (1886), and J.G. McCullough (1891).

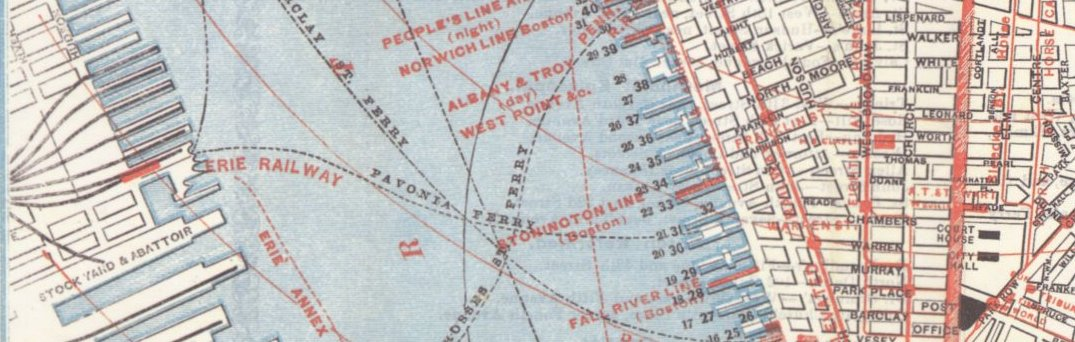
A map from 1879 of the Pavonia Ferry's route across the Hudson River to Chambers Street

It was not until 1910 with the opening of New York Tunnel Extension that rail service underneath the Hudson River was achieved and several railroads had ferry terminals on the west side of Manhattan (e.g. the Central Railroad of New Jersey's Liberty Street Ferry Terminal) so that their passengers could travel between New York City and their stations in New Jersey. The New York, Susquehanna and Western Railway used Pavonia Terminal so its passengers also used the terminal along with other commuters. During the 1940s and 1950s it was estimated that 25,000 passengers used the terminal daily.

Following a decline in passenger rail travel during the post-war years, the Erie Railroad closed its station at Pavonia in 1958 and on December 12, 1958 the last ferry left from Chambers Street Ferry Terminal. In 1962 Mayor Wagner allocated $162,000 to have the terminal demolished. Ferries continued to operate between New York and New Jersey until the 1960s when service was terminated, only for the service to be reestablished in 1986 with the founding of NY Waterway. Today the Battery Park City Ferry Terminal is located a few blocks south of where Chambers Street Ferry Terminal once stood.

== Gallery ==
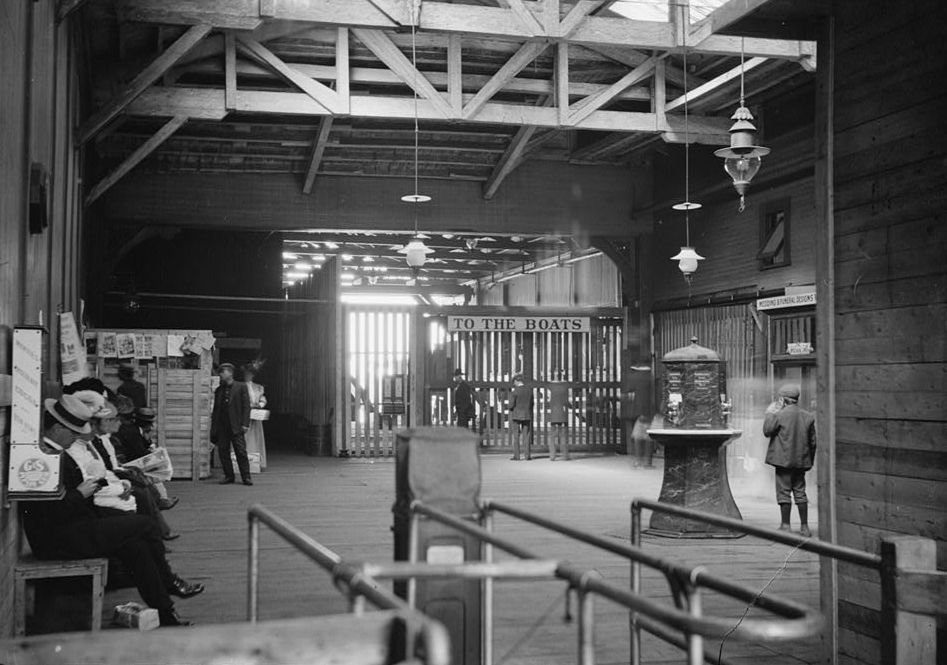
Passengers wait inside Chambers Street Ferry Terminal, c 1900

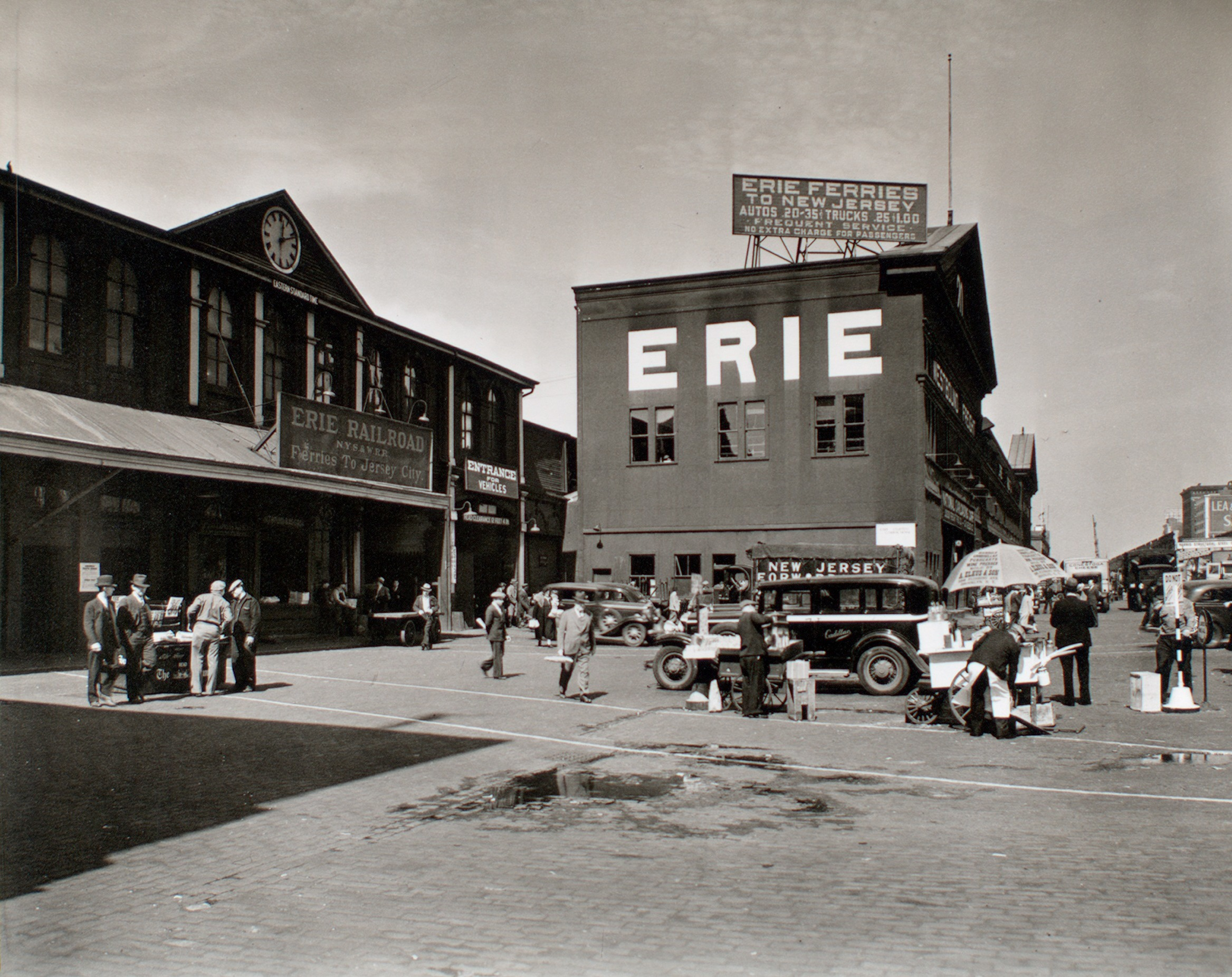
View of Chambers Street Ferry Terminal from the Southwest, 1938

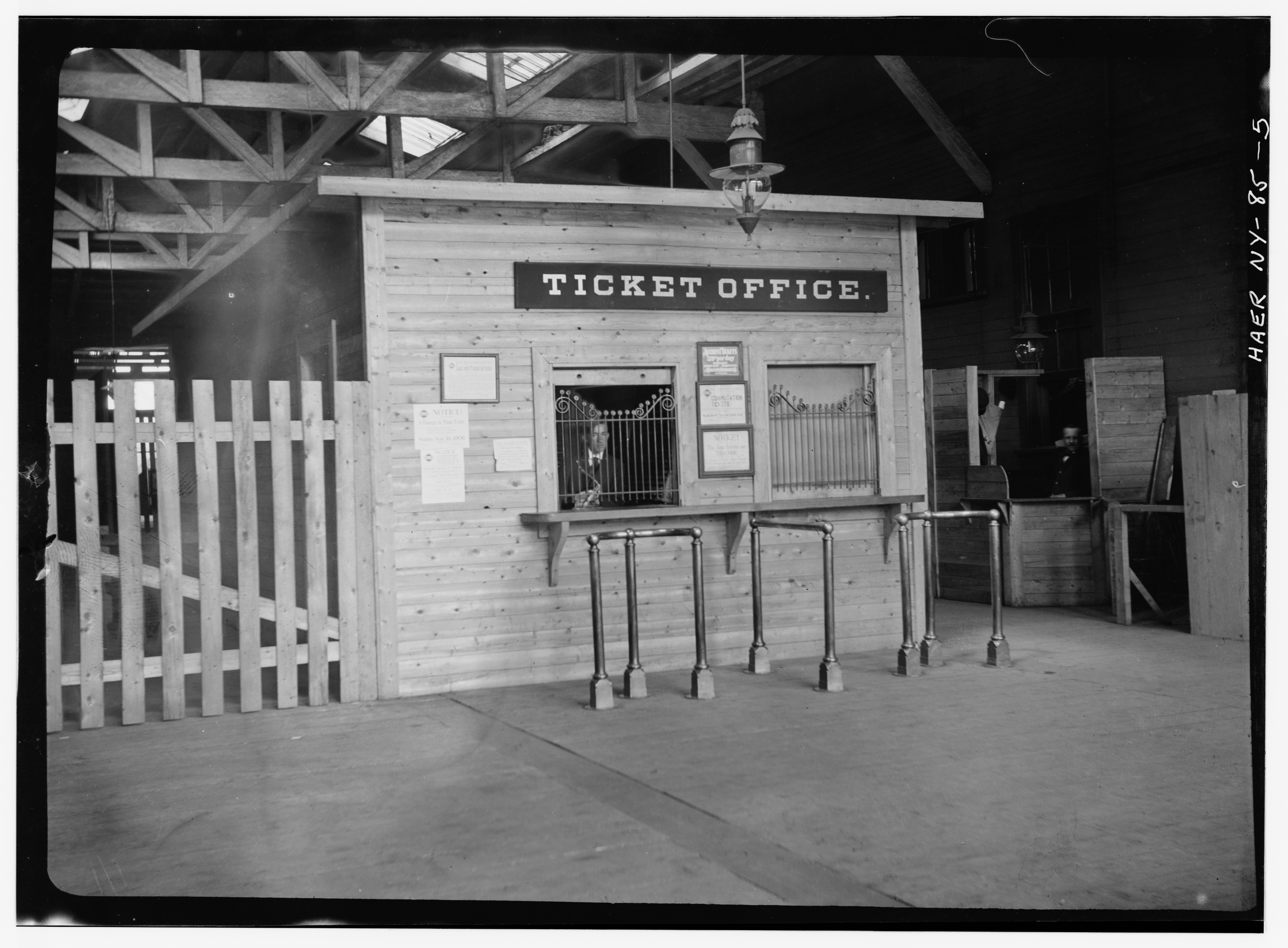
View of the ticket office at Chambers Street Ferry Terminal

== See also ==
- Whitehall Terminal
- Liberty Street Ferry Terminal
- Cortlandt Street Ferry Depot
- Battery Park City Ferry Terminal

| Preceding station | Erie Railroad | Following station |
|---|---|---|
| Jersey City Terminus | Pavonia Ferry | Terminus |
