= Philip Birnbaum =

Personal life
- Born: March 30, 1904 Kielce, Poland
- Died: March 19, 1988 (aged 83) Manhattan, New York, United States

Religious life
- Religion: Judaism
- Denomination: Orthodox

Jewish leader
- Main work: Daily Prayer Book (1949)

Philip Birnbaum (Hebrew: פַּלְטִיאֵל בִּירֶנְבּוֹים, romanized: Paltiel Birenboym; March 30, 1904 – March 19, 1988) was a Polish-American religious author and translator. He is best known for his work Ha-Siddur ha-Shalem, a translation and annotation of the Siddur first published in 1949.

== Biography ==
Title page of the Birnbaum Siddur. One can scroll through the entire siddur by clicking on the image.

Birnbaum was born in Kielce, Poland and emigrated to the United States in 1923. He attended Howard College (now Samford University) and received his Ph.D. from Dropsie College. He served for several years as the principal of a Jewish day school in Wilmington, Delaware, and directed Jewish schools in Birmingham, Alabama, and Camden, New Jersey. He was a regular columnist and book reviewer for the Hebrew-language weekly Ha-Doar. He also served on the board of directors of the Histadrut Ivrit b'America, an American association for the promotion of Hebrew language and culture.

His works include translations (with annotation and introductory material) of the Siddur (first published in 1949), the Machzor, the Torah with Haftorot, and the Passover Haggadah (published by the Hebrew Publishing Company). These translations sought to express reverence without appearing archaic. His Siddur and Machzor were pioneering in that the Hebrew text is of uniform typeface, "unlike the helter-skelter boldface paragraphing … found in Old World siddurim". His Siddur also contains the rarely published Megillat Antiochus.

Until the advent of the Artscroll and Koren translations, the Birnbaum Siddur and Machzor were widely used in Orthodox and Conservative synagogues, selling over 300,000 copies. These works presented "an accessible American English translation" and were pioneering in addressing American Jews' "perceived deficiencies in personal and communal prayer".

Birnbaum is also well known for his works of popular Judaism: his excerpted translation of Maimonides Mishne Torah, was one of the first into English; his "Encyclopedia of Jewish Concepts" and "A Treasury of Judaism" (an Anthology excerpting over 70 classic works) were widely referenced. He also produced a "readable" summary and translation of the Tanakh.

Birnbaum, a bachelor, was a long-time member of the Jewish Center in Manhattan, and led classes there.

== Legacy ==
On his death, one writer described him as "the most obscure best-selling author".

The Jewish Agency's Culture department describes "the Birnbaum" as "one of the most useful versions of the prayerbook."

Birnbaum's original gravestone misspelled his name, had the wrong birth year, and called him a "renouned author & scholar". In 2022, the original gravestone was replaced with one with all three mistakes corrected and a Hebrew verse from the High Holiday liturgy added.

== Publications ==
- Daily Prayer Book: Ha-Siddur Ha-Shalem. Hebrew Publishing Company. 1949.
- High Holyday Prayer Book : Mahzor Ha-shalem. Hebrew Publishing Company. 1951.
- Birnbaum, Philip; Hal-Lewi, Yafet Ben Ali (1942). The Arabic Commentary of Yefet ben Ali the Karaite, on the Book of Hosea. Literary Licensing, LLC. ISBN 9781258042332.
- Selihot. Hebrew Publishing Company. 1952.
- The New Treasury of Judaism. Hebrew Publishing Company. 1957. ISBN 0884824101.
- Machzor for Rosh Hashanah and Yom Kippur, Nusach Sefard. Hebrew Publishing Company. 1958.
- Daily Prayer Book: Ha-Siddur Ha-Shalem : Nosach Seferad. Hebrew Publishing Company. 1969..
- Daily Prayer Book: Ha-Siddur Ha-Shalem. Hebrew Publishing Company. 1977. ISBN 0884820548.
- High Holyday Prayer Book. Hebrew Publishing Company. 1979. ISBN 0884822400.
- Prayer Book for Sabbath and Festivals. Hebrew Publishing Company. 1977. ISBN 0884820548.
- The Birnbaum Haggadah. Hebrew Publishing Company. 1976. ISBN 0884829081.
- The Concise Jewish Bible. Hebrew Publishing Company. 1977. ISBN 0884824519.
- Torah and the Haftarot. Hebrew Publishing Company. 1983. ISBN 0884844560.
- Maimonides Mishneh Torah (Yad Hazakah). Hebrew Publishing Company. 1970. ISBN 0884824365.
- Encyclopedia of Jewish Concepts. Hebrew Publishing Company. 1979. ISBN 0884829308.
- A Book of Jewish Concepts. Hebrew Publishing Company. 1964.
