= Pavonia Ferry =

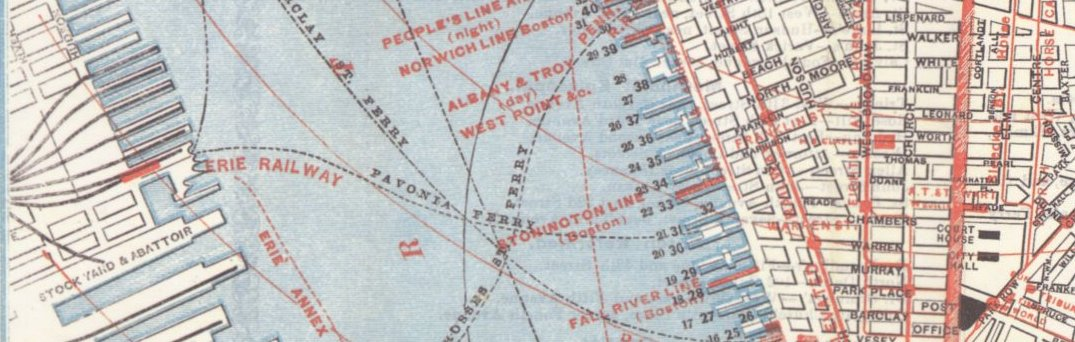
Map of the Pavonia Ferry's route across the Hudson River

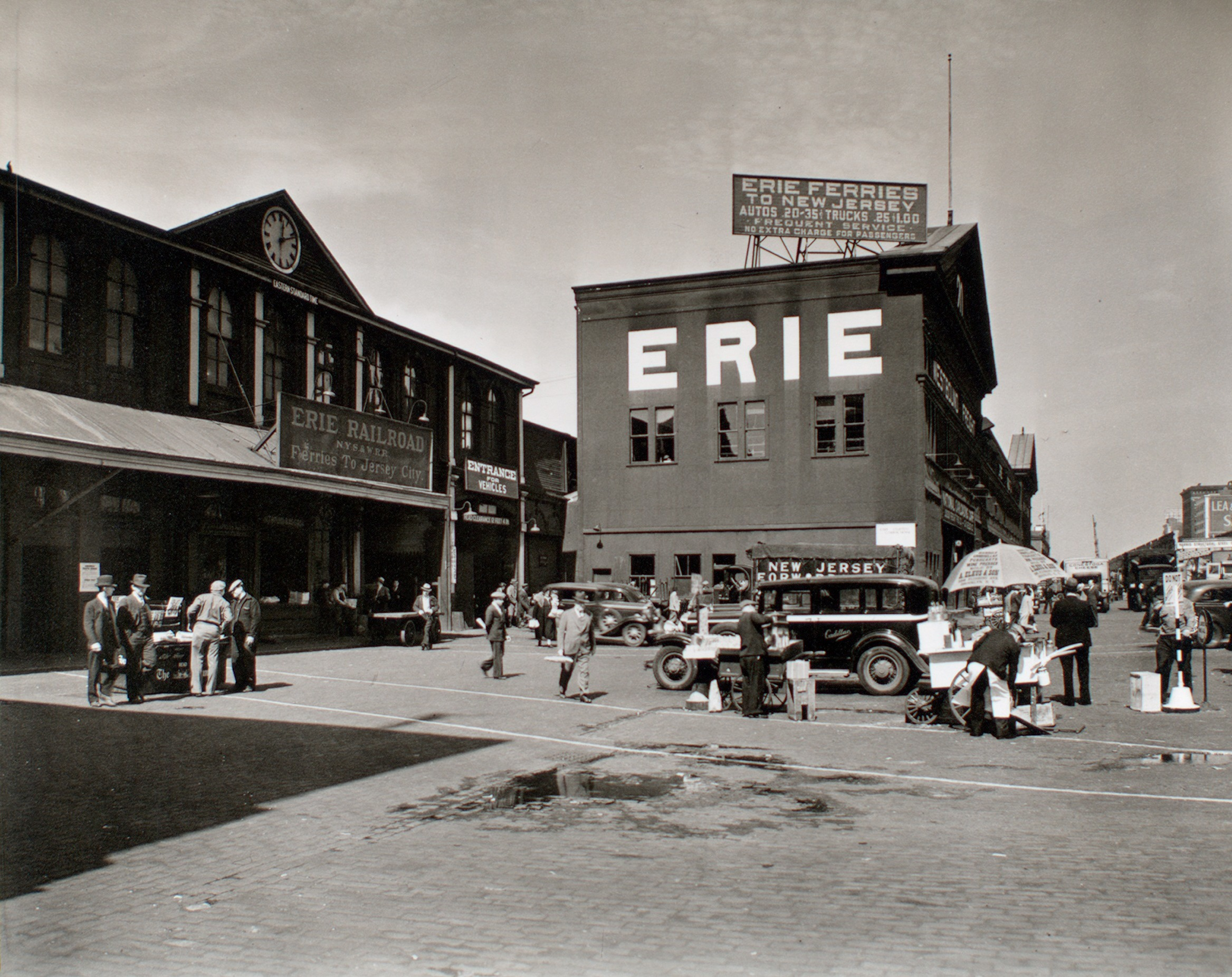
The Pavonia Ferry's Chambers Street Ferry Terminal at West Street and Chambers Street, 1938

The Pavonia Ferry was a ferry service on the Hudson River, operating between New York City and Jersey City, New Jersey, United States. It was launched in 1854. It was sold to the Pavonia Ferry Company of Jersey City for $9,050 (equivalent to $316,716 in 2024) at New York City Hall in February 1854.

The ferry takes its name from Pavonia, the first European settlement on the west bank of the Hudson, first established in 1633 as part of New Netherland and later expanded to the region known as Bergen.

In February 1859, Nathaniel Marsh of the Erie Railroad Company purchased the lease on behalf of the Pavonia Ferry Company. He started a ferry which ran from Chambers Street (Manhattan) to the foot of Pavonia Avenue on the other side of the Hudson Waterfront. Legal problems had prevented the Pavonia Ferry Company from establishing a ferry along this route. The New York and Erie Railroad paid an annual rent of $9,050 to transport passengers back and forth. Eventually, the railroad constructed its Pavonia Terminal on the landfilled Harsimus Cove. Suburban and long-distance travellers would transfer from trains to boats for the passage across the river. Service to 23rd Street began in 1869.

A January 18, 1903 letter from a Passaic, New Jersey reader to The New York Times, commented about the inadequacy of the boats of the Pavonia Ferry, which was then the property of the Erie Railroad. "All their boats are old, small and entirely inadequate to accommodate the crowds during rush hours." The vessels then in use by the Erie Railroad, listed with first year of service, were: Pavonia (1861), Susquehanna (1865), Delaware (1868), Chatauqua (1868), Passaic (1869), Ridgewood (1873), Paterson (1886), and J.G. McCullough (1891).

== See also ==
- Timeline of Jersey City area railroads
- Houston, West Street and Pavonia Ferry Railroad
- List of ferries across the Hudson River in New York City
