= Open Siddur Project =

- Developers: Efraim Feinstein (lead developer), Aharon Varady (founding director)
- Type: web-to-print, digital humanities, open-source Judaism
- License: LGPL, CC0, CC BY, CC BY-SA
- Website: opensiddur.org
- Repository: github.com/opensiddur/opensiddur/

The Open Siddur Project (Hebrew: פרויקט הסידור הפתוח, pronounced [pʁojekt hasiduʁ hapatuaχ]) is an open-source, web-to-print publishing and digital humanities project intent on sharing the semantic data of Jewish liturgy and liturgy-related work with free-culture compatible copyright licenses and Public Domain dedications. The project collaborates with other efforts in open-source Judaism in sharing content and code, advocates among related user-generated content projects to adopt Open Content licensing, and solicits copyright owners of related liturgical materials to share their work under free-culture compatible terms.

== Mission ==
The project's mission is to provide everyone with the technology and content necessary for publishing their own siddurim (Jewish prayer books) or any other digital or print materials featuring Jewish liturgy or liturgy-related work. The project is grounded in a user-centered design philosophy that emphasizes personal autonomy in spiritual practice and expression:

One-size fits all might make sense for elastic sweatpants, but hardly for expressing deep, meaningful relationships. Often, the deepest experiences are also the most fragile and difficult to access. Technologies which try to mediate these relationships, instead sadly succeed in alienating their users from their creative selves. For such an intimate relationship as that described by a spiritual practice, a mass-produced book cannot help but fail to reflect and support the practitioner’s evolving personal experience.

In case studies, the individual centered nature of the project has been recognized alternately as an expression of post-denominational Judaism and open-source religion, and for permitting individuals to "[engage] in a transformative endeavour independent of historical elites." The Open Siddur's mission stresses that it is a "non-prescriptive, non-denominational project whose only intent is to help revitalize Judaism by ensuring its collective spiritual resources — the creative content intended for communal use — remain free for creative reuse." The project describes itself as pluralist, "providing access to Jewish creativity in spiritual practice throughout the world and Jewish history up until the present day." The project also defines itself as inclusive, "[inviting] participation without prejudice towards ethnic heritage, skin color, nationality, belief or non-belief, sex, gender, sexuality or any other consideration."

== Origin ==
The project was conceived in 2001 when Aharon Varady began studying PERL and MySQL while working at Datarealm Internet Services, a webhosting company then located in Philadelphia. In 2002, he proposed the project and argued for its necessity.

Varady has cited a number of inspirations for the project: the essay "Immediatism" by Peter Lamborn Wilson; the do-it-yourself ethos and the Arts and Crafts Movement of William Morris and his Kelmscott Press; the work of bespoke artisans and master book artists in Neil Stephenson's novel The Diamond Age; the illustration of textual metadata in Rabbi Jacob Freedman's unpublished Siddur Bays Yosef (Polychrome Historical Prayer Book); the free culture movement advanced by Richard Stallman and Lawrence Lessig; and experiences with Jewish pluralism in the grassroots intentional community, Jews in the Woods.

The original impetus for the project came from his dissatisfaction with available Jewish prayerbooks and his desire to craft a siddur in the style of Rabbi Jacob Freedman's Polychrome Historical Prayerbook. The project was originally conceived as an open-source initiative since Varady thought that so long as the tedious work of digitizing liturgical texts were being made, that work should be shared between individuals or groups with similar ambitions, thereby saving them from having to "reinvent the wheel."

Unicode support for Hebrew with diacritics remained a major hurdle for all projects working with vocalized Hebrew text until 2003, when version 4.0 of Unicode was released. The project remained dormant until late 2008 when it merged with the Jewish Liturgy Project, an open-source project with similar goals being developed by Efraim Feinstein.

In the summer of 2009, the project was publicly launched with the support of Josh Kopelman and the PresenTense Group, an incubator for social entrepreneurship in Jerusalem. Since then, Varady has served as director of the project and Efraim Feinstein as lead developer of the Open Siddur web application.

== Development ==
The development vision of the project has been to create an open database of Jewish liturgy and liturgy related work "contemporary and historic, familiar and obscure, in every language Jews speak or have ever spoken" and to create a web application suitable for accessing this database which can serve text for web-to-print publishing. Since 2009, the project has been actively developing an open XML workflow for digital publishing.

Work on the Open Siddur is divided between the collection of content and the development of code. All creative work on the site is shared through non-conflicting open-source and free-culture copyright licenses, or Public Domain dedications.

Content is collected via digital transcription of scanned images of manuscripts and printed work in the Public Domain. The Open Siddur Project uses the ProofreadPage Mediawiki extension on Wikisource as its platform for crowdsourced transcription.

New work under copyright is shared directly by copyright owners at the project's website, opensiddur.org. Copyright owners share their work with any of three free-culture compatible copyright licenses maintained by the Creative Commons: (CC0, CC BY, and CC BY-SA).

The project depends heavily on XML technologies. The project preserves semantic data in text using TEI, an XML schema popular among digital humanities. All text is stored in EXist, an XML database. This permits liturgical variants to be encoded at the same level as the liturgical variation, and the linking of translations, instructions, notes, and other annotations to the text at any level.

Developed code is shared with the Lesser General Public License (LGPL). Code is shared online on GitHub. Development has focused separately on a server application supporting the transclusion of text in the database, and a user interface supporting users selecting, authoring, and adapting content from the database. As of March 2015, the Open Siddur text server is considered by the project to be beta-ready. The Open Siddur client interface is in an alpha stage of development and is accessible online.

== Advocacy ==
The Open Siddur Project advocates within the Jewish community for the use of free-culture compatible open-source licenses as a collaborative strategy for sharing creative content intended for public and private spiritual practice. Varady sees this effort as an expression of the traditional value of Rabbinic Jewish discourse, dimus parrhesia (דימוס פרהסיא, Aramaicized Greek meaning to participate freely and openly), and as being a proper and careful steward of Torah by creating a system supporting correct attribution of scholarly and creative work within an intellectual Commons.

As an expression of open source used in the context of cultural expression, the Open Siddur relates to goals articulated by Douglas Rushkoff in 2003 in calling for an Open Source Judaism, that could further develop and reform Jewish practice using the tools and principles of open source culture. Varady rejects the idea of open source being used explicitly for cultural reform, seeing it rather as a tool for sustaining cultural diversity and broadening scholarly and creative access for cultural participants:

"I was not interested in theorizing and theologizing new religions inspired by the culture of the open source movement. Rather, I was interested in how free culture and open source licensing strategies could help improve access and participation in the creative content I inherited from my ancestors in just that age when it was all transitioning from an analog print format to a searchable digital one."

== Accomplishments ==
Soon after the project's public launch in 2009, Rabbi Zalman Schachter-Shalomi shared Siddur Tefillat Hashem Yedaber Pi, his creative translation of the daily prayer service. (In an interview made in the early 1980s, Reb Zalman described a software service like the Open Siddur Project.) In 2010, the first complete siddur was shared with an Open Content license: Rabbi Rallis Weisenthal's Siddur Sefas Yisroel representing the traditions of the Bad Homburg Jewish community. A nearly complete siddur representing the practice of Jews in the Ḥabad movement of ḥassidim, was transcribed and shared in modular sections by Open Siddur Project volunteer, Shmueli Gonzales. Aharon Varady completed a digital transcription of the Pri Etz Hadar seder for Tu biShvat along with a free-culture licensed translation by Rabbi Dr. Miles Krassen. Efraim Feinstein created a demonstration of a transliteration engine for automatically transliterating texts according to adaptable transliteration schemas. The Jewish Publication Society shared its digital edition of the JPS 1917 through the project. In 2011, the Open Siddur helped to share a complete digital transcription of Yehoash Blumgarten's Yiddish translation of the Tanakh. In 2012, the project completed its first transcription of a prayer book, transcribing Fanny Schmiedl-Neuda's Stunden Der Andacht at German Wikisource. The project has since completed transcriptions of several other collections of women's prayers from the 19th century: Hours of Devotion (Fanny Schmiedl-Neuda, translated by Moritz Mayer, 1866), אמרי לב – Meditations And Prayers For Every Situation And Occasion In Life (Rabbi Arnaud Aron and Jonas Ennery, translated by Hester Rothschild, 1855), and Hanna. Gebet- und Andachtsbuch für israelitische Frauen und Mädchen (Jacob Freund et al., 1867). In 2014, the project published a complete transcription of Megillat Antiochus in Aramaic accompanied by its medieval Hebrew translation, a pre-War Yiddish translation, and Tzvi Hirsh Fillipowski's translation in English.

== Community ==
Beginning in 2009 with a discussion list hosted on Google Groups, a community of scholars, educators, artists, and other Jewish liturgy enthusiasts has coalesced around the project. As of December 2014, over one hundred people have shared material they have authored or translated. Nearly a thousand more follow the project in discussion groups on Facebook, Google+, and Google Groups.

The Open Siddur has served as a model for other open-source Jewish user-generated content projects remixing content from the Public Domain with copyrighted work shared with open content licensing, most notably the Sefaria Project. The Open Siddur shares content with Sefaria and other open source, free-culture projects such as Hebrew Wikisource.

== Recognition ==
The Open Siddur was the subject of a chapter "People of the (Open Source) Book” in Dan Mendelsohn Aviv's The End of the Jews: Radical Breaks, Remakes, and What Comes Next (Key Publishing, 2012). Gabrielle Girau Pieck researched the Open Siddur Project for a case study in her Masters thesis, Jewish Theology after Google: Post-Rabbinic and Post-Denominational Judaisms in a Digitized World (University of Basel, 2014). Project members have presented at NewCAJE (2010, 2011), LimmudNY (2010, 2013), Le Mood Montreal (2013), and at the EVA/Minerva 10th Annual Conference on Digitization & Culture at the Van Leer Institute in Jerusalem (2013). Efraim Feinstein has published an article with Devorah Preiss on the Open Siddur Project in the Lookstein Journal of Jewish Educational Leadership.

The project was recognized as "innovative" by Haaretz and Tablet Magazine, offered as an example of "Open Source religion" by Alan Jacobs in the Atlantic Magazine, and as an expression of the Jewish value of sharing Torah in Jewish Journal, and the Jewish Week.

== See also ==
- Ritualwell, a similar website for Jewish ritual, owned by Reconstructionist Rabbinical College
- Arts and Crafts Movement
- DIY ethic
- Digital humanities
- Open content
- Open educational resources
- Open-source Judaism
- Open-source religion
- Open textbook
- Torah database
- User-centered design
- User-generated content
- Web-to-print
