= VDP =

VDP may refer to:

== Technology ==
- Variable data printing, type of on-demand printing in which text and graphics may be altered in-process
- Variable data publishing, may to any variable data output, often to distinguish from "variable data printing" for electronic viewing output
- Vector Distance Panning, technique for panning sounds around a 3D array of speakers
- Video Disk Player, fore-runner of DVD player, now an obsolete format
- Video Display Processor, term used by Sega and other manufacturers for the Video Display Controller in some of its video game consoles
- Vulnerability disclosure program, programs where individuals can receive recognition and compensation for reporting software bugs, especially those about security exploits and vulnerabilities.

== Wine ==
- Verband Deutscher Prädikatsweingüter, or the Association of German Prädikat Wine Estates
- Vin de pays, French wine classification

== Other uses ==
- Association of German Pfandbrief Banks, or Verband Deutscher Pfandbriefbanken, in German
- USO1, a Vesicle Docking Protein
- Van Dyke Parks, American composer and arranger
- Vanden Plas, a coachbuilder and later, automotive marque and model designation, originally spelled Van den Plas and abbreviated "VdP".
- Village Defence Party, a paramilitary in Bangladesh.
- Visual descent point in aviation
- Volunteers for the Defense of the Homeland, VDP, in Burkina Faso.
