= Open Source Judaism =

Movement within Judaism to promote more accessible religious and cultural resources

A community generated logo for open-source Judaism (credit: Dan "Moebius" Sieradski).

Open-source Judaism is a name given to initiatives within the Jewish community employing open content and open-source licensing strategies for collaboratively creating and sharing works about or inspired by Judaism. Open-source efforts in Judaism utilize licensing strategies by which contemporary products of Jewish culture under copyright may be adopted, adapted, and redistributed with credit and attribution to the creators of these works. Often collaborative, these efforts are comparable to those of other open-source religious initiatives inspired by the free culture movement to openly share and broadly disseminate seminal texts and techniques under the aegis of copyright law. Combined, these initiatives describe an open-source movement in Judaism that values correct attribution of sources, creative sharing in an intellectual commons, adaptable future-proof technologies, open technological standards, open access to primary and secondary sources and their translations, and personal autonomy in the study and craft of works of Torah.

== Sharing Torah in Rabbinic Judaism ==
Unencumbered access to educational resources, the importance of attribution, and limiting proprietary claims on intellectual property, are all matters common to open-source, the free culture movement, and rabbinic Judaism. Open-source Judaism concerns itself with whether works of Jewish culture are shared in accord with Jewish teachings concerning proper stewardship of the Commons and civic responsibilities of property ownership.

The rhetorical virtue of parrhesia appears in Midrashic literature as a condition for the transmission of Torah. Connoting open and public communication, parrhesia appears in combination with the term, δῆμος (dimus, short for dimosia), translated coram publica, in the public eye, i.e. open to the public As a mode of communication it is repeatedly described in terms analogous to a Commons. Parrhesia is closely associated with an ownerless wilderness of primary mytho-geographic import, the Midbar Sinai in which the Torah was initially received. The dissemination of Torah thus depends on its teachers cultivating a nature which is as open, ownerless, and sharing as that wilderness. Here is the text from the Mekhilta where the term dimus parrhesia appears (see bolded text).

ויחנו במדבר - נתנה תורה דימוס פרהסיא במקום הפקר, שאלו נתנה בארץ ישראל, היו אומרים לאומות העולם אין להם חלק בה, לפיכך נתנה דימוס פרהסיא, במקום הפקר, וכל הרוצה לקבל יבא ויקבל. מפני מה לא ניתנה תורה בארץ ישראל? שלא ליתן פתחון פה לאומות העולם, לומר לפי שנתנה בארצו לפיכך לא קבלנו עלינו. דבר אחר: שלא להטיל מחלוקת בין השבטים, שלא יהא זה אומר בארצי נתנה תורה וזה אומר בארצי נתנה תורה, לפיכך נתנה במדבר, דימוס פרהסיא במקום הפקר. בשלושה דברים נמשלה תורה במדבר ובאש ובמים לומר לך מה אלו חנם לכל באי העולם אף דברי תורה חנם לכל באי העולם.

Torah was given over dimus parrhesia in a maqom hefker (a place belonging to no one). For had it been given in the Land of Israel, they would have had cause to say to the nations of the world, “you have no share in it.” ["it" being Torah] Thus was it given dimus parrhesia, in a place belonging to no one: “Let all who wish to receive it, come and receive it!” Why was the Torah not given in the land of Israel? In order that the peoples of the world should not have the excuse for saying: `Because it was given in Israel's land, therefore we have not accepted it. Another reason: To avoid causing dissension among the tribes [of Israel]. Else one might have said: In my land the Torah was given. And the other might have said: In my land the Torah was given. Therefore, the Torah was given in the Midbar (wilderness), dimus parrhesia, in a place belonging to no one. To three things the Torah is likened: to the Midbar (wilderness), to fire, and to water. This is to tell you that just as these three things are free to all who come into the world, so also are the words of the Torah free to all who come into the world.

Moreover, the place in which the story of the Torah's revelation occurred becomes analogous to the personal virtue that a student and teacher of Torah must cultivate in oneself. In the midrashic work, Bamidbar Rabbah (1:7), an exegesis based on the phonetic similarities between the name Sinai, and the word she'eino meaning "that is not," is offered:

"God spoke to Moshe in the Sinai wilderness" (Numbers 1:1). This teaches us that anyone that is not (she'eino) making themselves into a midbar hefker (a wilderness belonging to no one) cannot acquire Wisdom and Torah, and so it is called in the Sinai wilderness.

The question of whether ḥidushei torah (innovative teachings in torah), Jewish liturgy, and derivative and related work are in some sense proprietary is subordinate to the importance given to preserving the lineage of a teaching. According to a mishnaic teaching of Rabbi Yehoshua ben Levi, the 48th attribute of an excellent student is their capability in citing a teaching in the name of the one they learned it from.

The question of whether new works of Torah learning are given the status of property is a question born of the commodification of printed works, competition, and prestige in modernity. In their academic article "Is Copyright Property? – The Debate in Jewish Law," Neil Netanel and David Nimmer explain that,

Rabbinic tradition recognizes a fundamental public interest in making ḥidushei torah freely available to a community in need of knowledge and guidance about how Jewish law applies to contemporary life. Partly for that reason, Jewish law has long prohibited rabbinic scholars from profiting from teaching Jewish law and religion. Some argue, accordingly, that authors of ḥidushei torah may not assert a right to profit from their sale. Others mitigate that rule by distinguishing between the intangible work, that is the actual teaching presented in the book or tape, on the one hand, and the author’s labor and investment in reducing his teaching to writing or other fixed form and in printing, reproducing, and distributing the copies of his work, on the other. The author may not profit from, and has no property right in, the teaching itself, but is entitled to receive the full, customary salary for his labor and investment in preparing the manuscript or recording and in producing and distributing copies."

According to rabbinic Jewish teaching, the primary sin committed by the people of Sodom was their insistence on the absolute primacy of property, declaring that "what is mine is mine and what is yours is yours."

As applied by rabbinic jurists, the rule against acting like a Sodomite gives rise to three possible limitations on copyright, even assuming that copyright is property. First, if an author has created and disseminated his work with no intention of profiting from it, he suffers no economic loss even if another benefits from his work without paying for it, and thus such an author might be acting like a Sodomite were he to insist upon payment after the fact. Second, the rule against Sodomite behavior supports the view of some rabbinic jurists that private copying is permitted so long as the copier would not have otherwise purchased the copy and thus causes the author no loss. Third, the rule might be the basis for limiting copyright’s duration for published works. In his seminal ruling rejecting a perpetual, proprietary copyright while conceding that authors have an exclusive right to print their unpublished manuscripts, [Rabbi] Yitzhak Schmelkes [1828-1905] reasoned that copying causes the author no damage (as distinct from foregone profit) once the first edition has been sold, and thus that the rule against Sodomite behavior negates any continuing claim the author might have to enforce an exclusive right to print following the first edition.

What is akin to copyright in Jewish law in part derives from exclusive printing privileges that rabbinic authorities have issued since the invention of the printing press and date back to 1518. These privileges typically give the publisher the exclusive right to print the book for a period of ten to twenty years or until the first edition has been sold (i.e., after the author or heirs have recovered their investment). According to the minority position of Rabbi Joseph Saul Nathanson (1808–1875), a copyright is itself a property right arising out of the right of ownership. However, according to the majority position of Rabbi Yitzhak Schmelkes, "the author’s exclusive right to publish a manuscript and sell a first edition flows not from a proprietary copyright in the text, but only from the Jewish law of unfair competition or from the author’s right to condition access and use of the physical chattel, the manuscript, in which the author holds a property right." Ultimately, determination on the legal treatment of works of Jewish liturgy and ḥidushei torah depend upon a basic facet of rabbinic Jewish law: dinah malkhuta dina—the law of the land is (accorded to the status of) the Law. Under United States copyright law, for instance, all newly created "creative" works are considered as intellectual property and afforded proprietary property rights that restrict adaptation and redistribution of the works by others without explicit permission granted by the copyright owner.

To establish a community based instead on ḥesed (lovingkindness), the custom has long been for individuals to share or provide others with personal possessions as needed. The institution of the G'MaḤ provided a practical example for the sharing of books, tools, and services. The ideal of contributing to or forming one's own G'MaḤ was popularized by Rabbi Yisrael Meir Kagan (1838–1933), who addressed many halakhic questions about the practice and lauded the spiritual benefits of lending property in chapter 22 of his work, Ahavat Ḥesed (Loving Loving-kindness, 1888): "[Lending property] stems from compassion and constitutes a mitzvah, as ḤaZa"L have pointed out: "tzedaka is performed with one's money; ḥesed with one's money and one's self." Rashi explains ḥesed here to mean the lending of money, chattel (personal property), livestock—all being included in the mitzvah."

== Free–libre and open-source software ==
Prior to the coinage and adoption of the term "Open Source" in 1998, several Jewish computer scientists, typographers, and linguists developed free software of interest to Jews, students of Judaism, and readers of Hebrew. "Free software" (not to be confused with freeware) is software shared under a free license (such as the GPL), where the definition of "free" is maintained by freedomdefined.org.

Much of the development of free and open-source software was developed by Israeli computer scientists and programmers for the display, analysis, and manipulation of Hebrew text. This development has been celebrated by Hamakor a secular organization founded in 2003 to promote free and open-source software in Israel.

=== Calendar computation ===
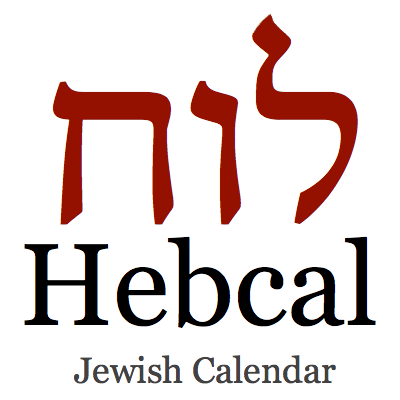
Hebrew calendar (Hebcal)

The earliest example of free software written for Jews may be the calendar code in GNU Emacs developed by Nachum Dershowitz and Edward Reingold in 1988, which included a Jewish calendar. This calendar code was further adapted by Danny Sadinoff in 1992 as hebcal. Such software provided a proof-of-concept for the utility of Open Source for innovating interesting and useful software for the Jewish and Hebrew speaking community. In 2005, the LGPL licensed Zmanim Project was begun by Eliyahu Hershfeld (Kosher Java) to maintain open-source software and code libraries for calculating zmanim, specific times of the day with applications in Jewish law.

=== Morphological analysis ===
In 2000, Israeli linguists Nadav Har'El and Dan Kenigsberg began development of an open-source Hebrew morphological analyzer and spell-checking program, Hspell (official website). In 2004, Kobi Zamir created a GUI for Hspell. The Culmus Project developed Nakdan, a semi-automatic diacritics tool based on Wiktionary for use with Open Office and LibreOffice. As of 2020, all Hspell terms and their morphological analyses are available on Wikidata.

=== Digital typography ===
In September 2002, Maxim Iorsh publicly released v.0.6 of Culmus, a package of Unicode Hebrew digital fonts licensed under the GPL, free software license. These and other fonts shared with SIL-OFL and GPL+FE licenses, provided the basic means for displaying Hebrew text on and offline in documents shared with Open Content licenses and in software shared with non-conflicting open-source licenses.

Canonical Jewish and liturgical texts (and some modern Hebrew poetry) depend upon diacritics for vocalization of Hebrew. Upon the introduction of the Unicode 4.0 standard in 2003, the Culmus Project, SIL, and other open-source typographers were able to begin producing digital fonts supporting the full range of Hebrew diacritics. By 2008, several open-source licensed fonts supporting Hebrew diacritics were available including Ezra (SIL NRSI Team), Cardo (David J. Perry, Fonts for Scholars), and Keter YG (Yoram Gnat, Culmus). The Open Siddur Project maintains a comprehensive archive of Unicode Hebrew fonts organized by license, typographer, style, and diacritical support.

=== Complex text layout ===
Throughout the 2000s, the display and rendering of Hebrew with diacritics improved with support of complex text layouts, bidirectional text, and right-to-left (RTL) positioned text in most popular open-source web browsers (e.g., Mozilla Firefox, Chromium), text editors (LibreOffice, OpenOffice), and graphic editors (GIMP). Improved support is still needed, especially in open-source text layout/design applications utilizing text (e.g., Inkscape, LyX, and Scribus).

=== Hebrew script OCR ===
In 2005, Kobi Zamir, began development of the first Hebrew OCR to recognize Hebrew diacritics, hOCR, released open-source under the GPL. A GUI, qhOCR soon followed. By 2010, development on hOCR had stalled; legacy code is available on Github. In 2012, researchers at Ben-Gurion University began training the open-source Tesseract-OCR to read Hebrew with niqud. Meanwhile, open-source OCR software supporting other Jewish languages written in Hebrew script is in development, namely, Jochre for Yiddish, being developed by Assaf Urieli. Urieli explains the difficulty of supporting Hebrew with diacritics in OCR software:

the possible combinations are huge: 27 letters if you include the final forms × 9 niqqudim (more if we consider biblical niqqud) × cantillation marks. This means for an algorithm based on classification (such as Jochre), there are far too many classes, and it’s virtually impossible to get sufficient representation in an annotated training corpus. It would be better to imagine a two-pass algorithm: the first pass recognizes the letter, and the second pass recognizes the diacritics (niqqud + cantillation). However, this would require development in Jochre – it’s hard to guess how much without analyzing further. Note that Yiddish doesn’t suffer from the same difficulty, since there is very little niqqud used, and only in certain fixed places (e.g. komets aleph, etc.).

== "Open Source Judaism" ==
The term "Open Source Judaism" first appeared in Douglas Rushkoff's book Nothing Sacred: The Truth about Judaism (2003). Rushkoff employed the term "Open Source" for Judaism in describing a democratic organizational model for collaborating in a commonly held religio-cultural source code: the Oral and Written Torah. Rushkoff conceived of Judaism as essentially an open-source religion which he understood as, "the contention that religion is not a pre-existing truth but an ongoing project. It may be divinely inspired, but it is a creation of human beings working together. A collaboration." For Rushkoff, Open Source offered the promise of enacting change through a new culture of collaboration and improved access to sources. "Anyone who wants to do Judaism should have access to Judaism. Judaism is not just something that you do, it's something you enact. You've got to learn the code in order to alter it."

Rushkoff's vision of an Open Source Judaism was comparable to some other expressions of open-source religion explicitly advocating for doctrinal reform or change in practice. As an expression of Open Source Judaism, in 2002 Rushkoff founded a movement called Reboot. "The object of the game, for me, was to recontextualize Judaism as an entirely Open Source proposition." (Rushkoff subsequently left Reboot when he felt its funders had become more concerned with marketing and publicity of Judaism than its actual improvement and evolution.)

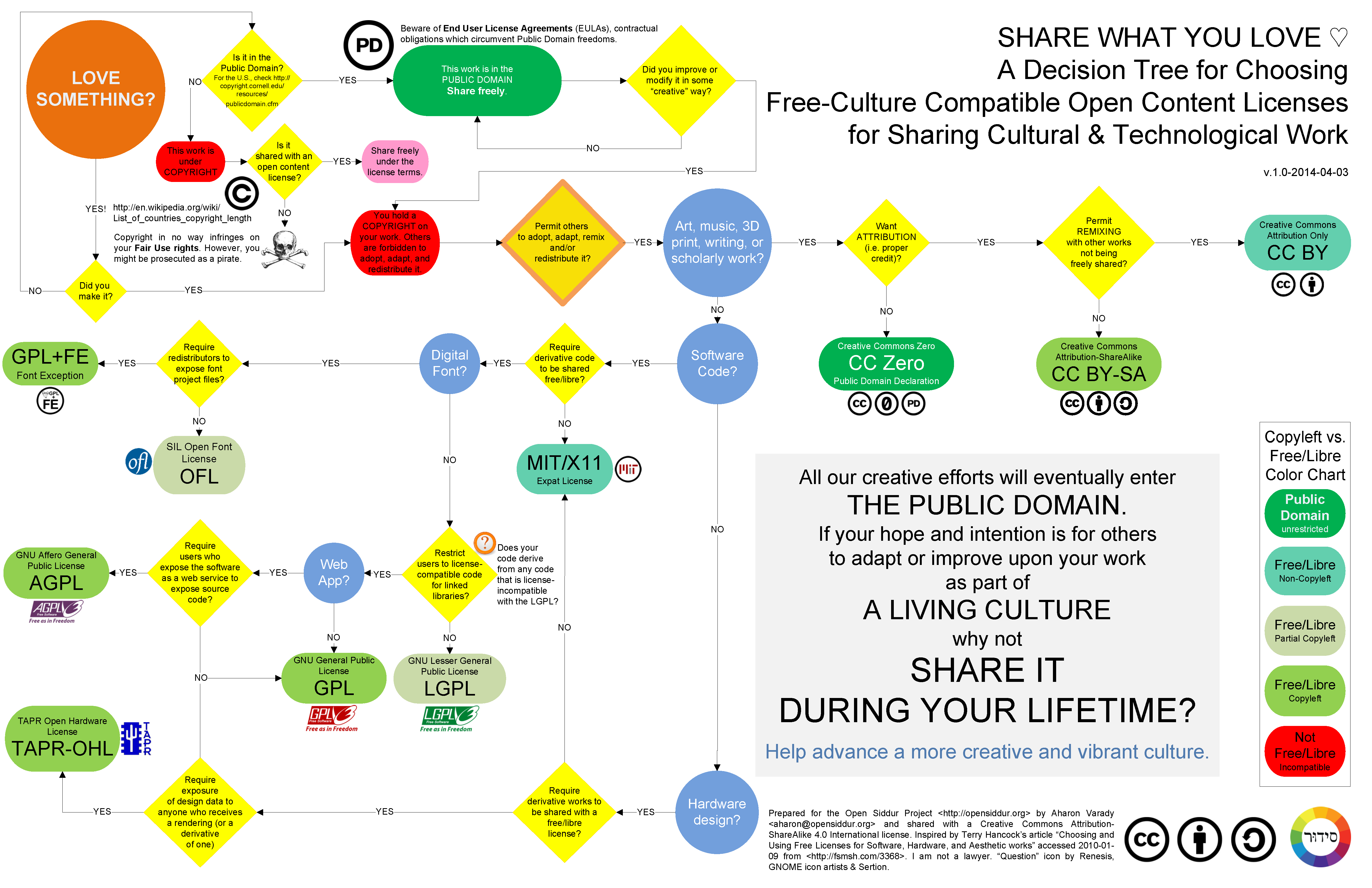
Open source advocacy by an open-source Jewish project. "This decision tree helps copyright owners choose the right free/libre license for the type of cultural or technological work they wish to share: software, hardware, art, music, or scholarly work."

Early confusion over the means by which "open-source" projects collaborate, led some Jewish social entrepreneurs inspired by Rushkoff's idea to develop their work without indicating a license, publicly sharing code, or attributing content. Others offered "Open Source" as a model to be emulated but expressed no understanding of the role open-source licensing played in open-source collaboration and no opinion as to what role said licenses might serve for an Open Source Judaism. Many advocates for the adoption of Open Source in Judaism now work to clarify the meaning of "open" and "free," and to convince projects soliciting user-generated content to adopt free-culture compatible Open Content licensing.

Instead of rallying around Open Source as a means towards religious reform as Rushkoff suggested, other open-source Jewish projects strive to present their work as non-denominational and non-prescriptive. They see free-culture and open-source licensing as a practical means towards preserving culture, improving participation, and supporting educational objectives in an era of shifting media formats and copyright restrictions. In an interview with the Atlantic Magazine, the founder of the open-source Open Siddur Project, Aharon Varady, explained,

"...I was interested in how free culture and open-source licensing strategies could help improve access and participation in the creative content I inherited from my ancestors in just that age when it was all transitioning from an analog print format to a searchable digital one. To me it seemed both obvious and necessary to pursue the digitization of existing works in the public domain, and broaden the network of students, scholars, practitioners, and communities that were already adopting, adapting, and distributing their inspired creativity and scholarship -- but were only doing so in the highly restricted channel of copyrighted work....The essential problem is how to keep a collaborative project like Judaism culturally vital, in an age when the creative work of participants in the project -- prayers, translations, commentaries, songs, etc. -- are immediately restricted from creative reuse by "All Rights Reserved" copyright. The fact is that broad creative engagement in collaborative projects isn't only limited by technological forces: these can be and have been overcome. They are limited by legal forces that assume creatives have only a proprietary interest in their work."

Open source offered a licensing strategy that could be employed for helping a community of users remix user-generated content such as translations of liturgy in the preparation of new prayerbooks, or for anyone to simply access Jewish content that could be redistributed with attribution and without fear of copyright infringement. The three non-conflicting "free" licenses by the free-culture advocacy group, Creative Commons (CC0, CC BY, and CC BY-SA), provided the basis of this strategy. By 2012, Dr. Dan Mendelsohn Aviv observed that,

Jewish users, too, have embraced this do-it-yourself and open source ethos. In coming together to open source a project, users not only produce an evolving and meaningful Jewish artifact, they also construct a Jewish community that often extends both temporally and physically beyond the scope of the original project. Riffing on [Eric S.] Raymond['s "The Cathedral and the Bazaar"], Jewish users are definitely creatures of the bazaar as they revisit, reconsider and, in some cases, rework many of the seminal texts in Jewish life: the Siddur, the Tanakh, the d’var torah (sermon), the Haggadah, and The Book of Legends. These "open source projects" not only invited involvement by users at their individual level of learning and desire for engagement, but created connections and forged bonds between individuals across time zones and denominations.

== Open content projects ==
Hebrew Wikisource, a database of largely rabbinic Jewish texts in Hebrew

The Sefaria Project, a Torah database of rabbinic Jewish texts, translations, and sourcesheets

The Open Siddur Project, a digital humanities project sharing Jewish liturgy and liturgy-related work that is developing a web-to-print application.

Although a work of radical 1960s Jewish counterculture rather than an explicitly religious work, the satirical songbook Listen to the mocking bird (Times Change Press, 1971) by the Fugs' Naphtali "Tuli" Kupferberg contains the earliest explicit mention of "copyleft" in a copyright disclaimer.

While digital editions of biblical and rabbinic Jewish sourcetexts proliferated on the World Wide Web by the mid-2000s, many of these lacked information as to the provenance of their digital texts. Common Torah database applications such as the Bar-Ilan Responsa Project and Hebrew text editing software such as Davka Corps. DavkaWriter, relied upon end-user license agreements explicitly forbidding the copy of included texts despite these texts residing in the Public Domain. Other websites, such as Mechon Mamre, presented public domain texts but indicated that the digital editions they presented were Copyrighted works, "All Rights Reserved." Many scholarly databases containing transcriptions of manuscripts and digital image collections of scanned manuscripts (e.g. hebrewbooks.org) lacked open access policies. In 1999, the Hebrew equivalent of Project Gutenberg, Project Ben Yehudah, was established in Israel as a digital repository of Hebrew literature in the Public Domain (excepting religious texts). The limited scope of Project Ben Yehuda presented a need for another platform to be used for editing, proofreading and formatting religious Jewish texts in Hebrew under a free license in a collaborative environment.

Open Content licensing and Public Domain dedications provide the basis for open collaboration and content sharing across open-source projects of particular interest to Hebrew readers and students of Judaism. The importance of compatible licensing cannot be understated. In the summer of 2009, content across the Wikimedia Foundation adopted new Open Content licensing in response to incompatibilities between the GNU Free Document license and the Creative Commons Attribution-ShareAlike (CC BY-SA) copyleft license. After this, other non-Wikimedia Foundation projects using Open Content licensing were finally able to exchange content with Wikipedia and Wikisource under a common standard copyleft. This license transition was also significant because Wikisource provided a transcription environment available for multi-user collaboration. With the switch to an Open Content copyleft license, users could collaborate on transcriptions at Wikisource without concern for license incompatibility of the resulting digital editions.

=== Torah databases and the digital humanities ===
Inside and outside the Jewish community, digital humanities projects often developed by scholars in academic institutions and theological seminaries, provided the basis for later open-source initiatives. The Westminster Leningrad Codex, a digital transcription of the Leningrad Codex maintained by the J. Alan Groves Center for Advanced Biblical Research at the Westminster Theological Seminary was based on the Michigan-Claremont-Westminster Electronic Text of Biblia Hebraica Stuttgartensia (1983) and shared with a Public Domain dedication.

Hebrew Wikisource was created in 2004 to provide a free and openly licensed home for what is known in Israel as the "Traditional Jewish Bookshelf," thus filling the need left by Project Ben Yehudah. The digital library at Hebrew Wikisource consists not just of texts that have been typed and proofread, but also hundreds of texts that have been punctuated and formatted (as a means of making them accessible to modern readers), texts are linked in tens of thousands of places to sources and parallel literature (as a well of facilitating the conversation between generations that is a feature of the traditional bookshelf), texts that have collaboratively produced commentaries (such as the Mishnah), and texts that have been corrected in new editions based on manuscripts and early versions. While Hebrew Wikisource is open to all texts in Hebrew, and not just to Judaica, it has primarily focused on the latter because the vast majority of public domain Hebrew texts are rabbinic ones. Hebrew Wikisource was the first independent language-domain of Wikisource. In 2009, Yiddish Wikisource was created.

In 2013, Dr. Seth (Avi) Kadish and a small team completed a carefully corrected draft of a new digital experimental edition of the Tanakh at Hebrew Wikisource, Miqra `al pi ha-Mesorah, based on the Aleppo Codex and related manuscripts, and consulting the full range of masoretic scholarship.

In 2010, Moshe Wagner began work on a cross-platform Torah database called Orayta. Source code is licensed GPL and copyrighted content is licensed CC BY.

In 2012, Joshua Foer and Brett Lockspeiser began work on developing a free-culture licensed digital library of canonical Jewish sources and a web application for generating "sourcesheets" (handouts with a sequence of primary sources for study and discussion) from this repository. The Sefaria Project organizes the translation of essential works of rabbinic Judaism, such as the Mishnah, and seeks English translations of many other seminal texts. The project mostly uses a combination of CC BY and CC0 licenses to share its digital library and foster collaboration of its paid and volunteer contributors. Certain seminal works, notably the JPS 1985 and the Steinsaltz translation of the Talmud, are shared under restrictive Creative Commons licenses that do not conform to open-source principles.

=== Web-to-print publishing ===
In August 2002, Aharon Varady proposed the creation of an "Open Siddur Project," a digital humanities project developing a database of Jewish liturgy and related work ("historic and contemporary, familiar and obscure") and a web-to-print application for users to contribute content and compile their own siddurim. All content in the database would be sourced from the Public Domain or else shared by copyright owners with Open Content licenses. Lack of available fonts supporting the full range of Hebrew diacritics in Unicode kept the idea from being immediately workable. The idea was revived on New Year's Eve December 2008 when Varady was introduced to Efraim Feinstein who was pursuing a similar goal. In the summer of 2009, the renewed project was publicly launched with the help of the PresenTense Group, an incubator for social entrepreneurship. While the application remains in development, all code for the project is publicly shared on GitHub with an LGPL. Meanwhile, liturgy and related work is being shared at opensiddur.org with any one of the three Open Content licenses authored by the Creative Commons: the CC0 Public Domain dedication, the CC BY attribution license, and the CC BY-SA Attribution/ShareAlike license. The Open Siddur Project also maintains a package of open-source licensed Unicode Hebrew digital fonts collecting fonts from Culmus and other open-source font foundries. Wikisource is currently the transcription environment for digitizing printed Public Domain content by the Open Siddur Project.

=== Encyclopedic references ===
In July 2004, WikiProject Judaism was founded on English Wikipedia. The project helped incorporate numerous articles from the Jewish Encyclopedia (1906), a reference work in the Public Domain, so that it would be shared and expanded upon under the terms adopted by the Wikimedia Foundation.

=== Other educational tools ===
In 2011, Russel Neiss and Rabbi Charlie Schwartz were supported by the Jewish New Media Fund in building PocketTorah, a portable app for studying the chanting of the weekly Torah reading. Project funding subsidized recording of the entire Torah chanted according to the Ashkenazic custom. All recordings used in the software were shared with CC BY-SA licenses and contributed to the Internet Archive. All code for the app was shared with an LGPL.

== Community support for Open Source Judaism ==
Projects that are not funded through competitive grants are supported by a combination of volunteer contributions, small donations, and out-of-pocket expenses by project organizers. Hubs for social entrepreneurship and Jewish education have come to serve as meeting places for project organizers with complementary interests in Open Source and Open Content. In 2009, the PresenTense Group in Jerusalem served as the meeting place for Aharon Varady (Open Siddur), Russel Neiss, and Rabbi Charlie Schwartz (PocketTorah). Another hub for Open Source in the Jewish world has been Mechon Hadar. The umbrella institution of the Halakhic Egalitarian yeshiva, Yeshivat Hadar, revised its copyright policy in November 2014 and began sharing its searchable database of sourcesheets, lectures, and audio recordings of Jewish melodies with a Creative Commons Attribution (CC BY) license. The institution has been a hub for open-source community initiatives. In 2009–2010, Mechon Hadar provided Aharon Varady with a community project grant for the Open Siddur Project. In April 2015, Aharon Varady and Marc Stober co-founded the Jewish Free Culture Society in order to better support new and existing projects in open-source Judaism and to represent the interests of open-source in the Jewish community.

== See also ==
- Arts and Crafts movement and DIY ethic
- Autonomy
- Commons and tragedy of the commons
- Copyfraud
- Copyleft
- Copyright
- End-user license agreement (EULA)
- Free content and open content
- Free-culture movement
- GeMaḤ
- Gratis versus libre (free without payment vs. freedom for reuse)
- License compatibility
- Open-source license and open source
- Open source religion
- Public domain
