= Hilail Gildin =

American academic (1928–2015)

- Born: November 28, 1928; Poland
- Died: March 3, 2015 (aged 86); Manhattan, New York, United States

Philosophical work
- Era: 20th-century philosophy
- Region: Western Philosophy
- School: Continental philosophy; Platonism
- Main interests: Truth; Parrhesia; Political Philosophy; Platonic Dialogues

Hilail Gildin (November 28, 1928 – March 3, 2015) was an American scholar and editor. He served as professor of philosophy at Queens College, City University of New York. He was also the editor-in-chief of Interpretation: A Journal of Political Philosophy.

He was awarded his Ph.D. in 1962 by the University of Chicago, where he was a student of Leo Strauss, with whom Gildin collaborated closely in the establishment of the journal Interpretation.

== Bibliography ==
- The problem of political liberty in Mill and Spinoza (1962)
- Rousseau's Social Contract: The Design of the Argument (1985)
- An Introduction to Political Philosophy, Ten Essays by Leo Strauss (ed., 1989)
- 'Deja Jew All Over Again: Dannhauser on Leo Strauss and Atheism.' Interpretation: A Journal of Political Philosophy, 25, no. 1 (Fall 1997): pp. 125–33.
