= Open-source religion =

Application of open-source methodologies to religious belief

Open-source religions employ open-source methods for the sharing, construction, and adaptation of religious belief systems, content, and practice. In comparison to religions utilizing proprietary, authoritarian, hierarchical, and change-resistant structures, open-source religions emphasize sharing in a cultural Commons, participation, self-determination, decentralization, and evolution. They apply principles used in organizing communities developing open-source software for organizing group efforts innovating with human culture. New open-source religions may develop their rituals, praxes, or systems of beliefs through a continuous process of refinement and dialogue among participating practitioners. Organizers and participants often see themselves as part of a more generalized open-source and free-culture movement.

== Origin ==
In 1994, with his essay, "The Holy War: Mac vs. DOS," the scholar and novelist Umberto Eco popularized the use of religious metaphors in comparing operating system design and user experience. By the late 1990s, the term "open-source religion" began appearing in technology magazines as a reference to the open-source Linux operating system's organizing principle and as an analogy for highlighting the philosophical differences between advocates of open-source vs. proprietary software. In 2001, Daniel Kriegman began describing a religion he invented called Ozacua (later Yoism) as "the world's first opensource religion." The concept of an "open source religion" was further expanded upon by the media theorist, Douglas Rushkoff in his book, Nothing's Sacred: The Truth about Judaism (2003), where he offered the following description as an introduction to Open Source Judaism:

An open source religion would work the same way as open source software development: it is not kept secret or mysterious at all. Everyone contributes to the codes we use to comprehend our place in the universe. We allow our religion to evolve based on the active participation of its people....An open source relationship to religion would likewise take advantage of the individual points of view of its many active participants to develop its more resolved picture of the world and our place within it.

=== Discordianism, Copyleft, and open-source software ===
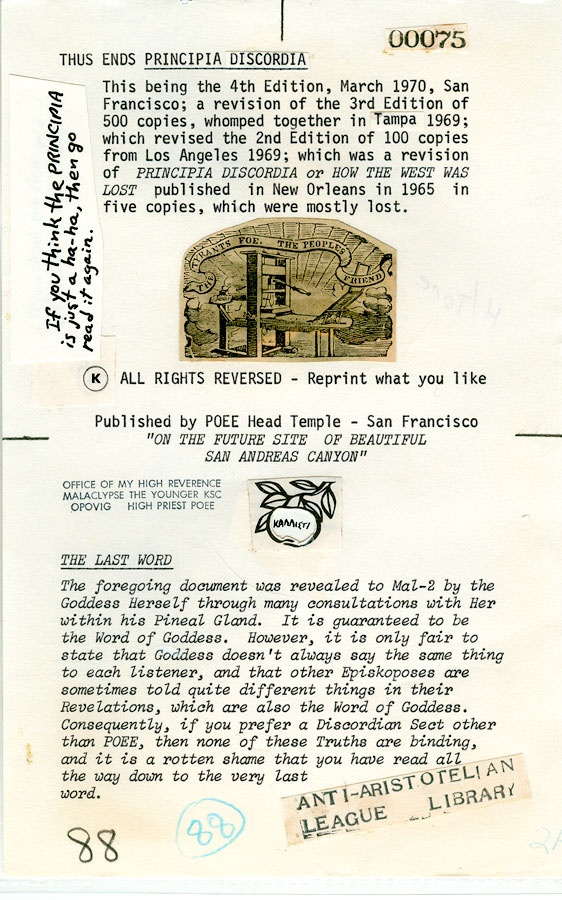
Page of the Principia Discordia that includes the following Copyright disclaimer, "Ⓚ ALL RIGHTS REVERSED – Reprint what you like," the earliest example of what would become a declaration of copyleft.

Discordian reference to the mythological Kallisti, or Apple of Discord, as an all rights reversed symbol.

Before the coinage of the term open-source in 1998 or even the birth of the Free Software movement, the Principia Discordia, a Discordian religious text written by Greg Hill with Kerry Wendell Thornley, included the following Copyright disclaimer in its 4th edition (1970), "Ⓚ ALL RIGHTS REVERSED – Reprint what you like." By the summer of 1970, the implications of the disclaimer were being discussed in other underground publications.

Commercial publishers are not likely to be interested in the Principia due, at least, to the counter copyright on it–for, if they had a good seller, then other publishers could print it out from under them. Consequently publication and distribution will have to occur spontaneously, thru the “underground”, as alternative cultures learn to meet their own needs and provide their own services. This non-commercial limitation of the Principia is to provide less limitations in other respects, and it is not an accident. The Principia is not simply a handbook, it is a demonstration.

Via the counterculture, by the mid-1970s, the concept had influenced a generation of Discordians including the nascent hacker culture. The project to create Tiny BASIC was proposed in Bob Albrecht and Dennis Allison's Dr. Dobb's Journal of Tiny BASIC Calisthenics & Orthodontia, a journal of the Homebrew Computer Club, a small group of computer hobbyists who began meeting in 1975 around Silicon Valley. The first lines of the source code for Tiny Basic as released in 1976 by Li-Chen Wang stated ‘(ↄ) COPYLEFT ALL WRONGS RESERVED’. In 1984–5 programmer Don Hopkins sent Richard Stallman a letter labeled "Copyleft—all rights reversed". Stallman chose the phrase to identify his free software method of distribution. The relationship between Discordianism and "Kopyleft" remain part of the culture of Discordianism, as explained by the Discordian Rev. Dr. Jon Swabey in his Apocrypha Discordia.

Discordianism and the concept of KopyLeft go hand in hand. Although just a small part of the counter-culture gestalt, I believe that the Principia Discordia was probably one of the earliest expressions and strongest champions of this idea, which has since seen such concepts as the open source software initiative, with endeavours such as the Linux Operating System.”

== Open-source in established religious traditions ==
For established traditions whose canonical works, records of discourse, and inspired artworks reside in the public domain, keeping these works open and available in the face of proprietary interests has inspired several open-source initiatives. Open access to resources and adaptive reuse of shared materials under open content licensing provide a structure by which communities can innovate new religious systems collaboratively under the aegis of copyright law. For some religious movements, however, public access and literacy, and the potential of adaptive reuse also provide an opportunity for innovation and reform within established traditions. In an interview by Alan Jacobs in The Atlantic magazine on open-source religion, Aharon Varady (founding director of the Open Siddur Project) explained that "cultures breathe creativity like we breathe oxygen" arguing that open-source provides one possible strategy for keeping a tradition vibrant while also preserving historical works as non-proprietary during a period of transition from analog to digital media.

=== Open-source Judaism ===
Although a work of radical 1960s Jewish counterculture rather than an explicitly religious work, the satirical songbook Listen to the mocking bird (Times Change Press, 1971) by the Fugs' Naphtali "Tuli" Kupferberg contains the earliest explicit mention of "copyleft" in a copyright disclaimer. Later open-source efforts in Judaism begin to appear in 1988 with the free software code written for calculating the Hebrew calendar included in Emacs. After the popularization of the term "open-source" in 1998, essays and manifestos linking open-source and Judaism began appearing in 2002 among Jewish thinkers familiar with trends in new media and open-source software. In August 2002, Aharon Varady proposed the formation of an "Open Siddur," an open-source licensed user-generated content project for digitizing liturgical materials and writing the code needed for the web-to-print publishing of Siddurim (Jewish prayer books). Meanwhile, media theorist Douglas Rushkoff began articulating his understanding of open-source in Judaism. "The object of the game, for me," Rushkoff explained, "was to recontextualize Judaism as an entirely Open Source proposition."

Open-Source Judaism logo

The term "Open Source Judaism" first appeared in Douglas Rushkoff's book Nothing Sacred: The Truth about Judaism (2003). Rushkoff employed the term "Open Source" to describe a democratic organizational model for collaborating in a commonly held source: the Hebrew Bible and other essential works of Rabbinic Judaism. Rushkoff conceived of Judaism as essentially an open-source religion which he conceived as, "the contention that religion is not a pre-existing truth but an ongoing project. It may be divinely inspired, but it is a creation of human beings working together. A collaboration." For Rushkoff, open-source offered the promise of enacting change through a new culture of collaboration and improved access to sources. "Anyone who wants to do Judaism should have access to Judaism. Judaism is not just something that you do, it's something you enact. You've got to learn the code in order to alter it." The 2003 publication of Rushkoff's book Nothing Sacred: The Truth about Judaism and an online forum dedicated to "Open Source Judaism" inspired several online projects in creating web applications for generating custom made haggadot for Passover, however neither content nor code for these were shared under free-culture compatible open content terms.

Beginning with the Open Siddur Project in 2009, open-source projects in Judaism began to publicly share their software code with open-source licenses and their content with free-culture compatible open content licenses. The explicit objectives of these projects also began to differ from Rushkoff's "Open Source Judaism." Rather than seek reforms in religious practices or doctrines, these projects used Open Content licenses to empower users to access and create their own resources from a common store of canonical texts and associated translations and metadata. By 2012, open-source projects in Judaism were mainly active in facilitating collaboration in sharing resources for transcribing and translating existing works in the Public Domain, and for adaptation and dissemination of works being shared by copyright owners under Open Content licenses.

=== Open-source Yoga ===
Following proprietary claims on Yoga movements by some Yoga instructors, Open Source Yoga Unity was formed in 2003 to assert that Yoga movements reside in the public domain. The organization provides a common voice, and the pooling of resources, to legally resist the application of a proprietary Copyright to any Yoga style thereby "ensuring its continued natural unfettered practice for all to enjoy and develop." The organization explains, that "while we appreciate the teachings of yoga teachers, we do not believe that they have the legal right to impose control over another's Yoga teaching or practice." In Open Source Yoga Unity v. Bikram Choudhury (2005), the organization settled out of court, avoiding a federal court hearing to determine whether Bikram Choudhury's copyrighted sequence of 26 poses and two breathing exercises could be legally protected.

=== Open-source Wicca ===
Concerned with the lack of a source text containing documentation on Wicca in the tradition of Gerald Gardner, Dr. Leo Ruickbie self-published Open Source Wicca: The Gardnerian Tradition (2007) for "putting you back in control of spirituality." The work, a collection of "the original foundation documents of Wicca" authored between 1949 and 1961, was published digitally and in print under a Creative Commons Attribution license.

== Open-source in establishing new religions ==
Several projects aiding individuals and communities in formulating their own belief systems cite inspiration from ideas common to the open-source movement and self-identify as open-source religions or religious initiatives. The establishment of new religions through open-source methods is closely related to chaos magic, which emphasizes the pragmatic use of belief systems and the creation of new and unorthodox methods, the difference being that any knowledge gained through such innovation is shared openly.

=== Yoism ===
Yoism

According to one founder, Daniel Kriegman, Yoism (founded 1994) combines rational inquiry, empiricism, and science with Spinozan or Einsteinian pantheism. Inspired by the Linux operating system, Kriegman describes his religion as "open-source" and explains that, similar to open-source software projects, participants in Yoism do not owe their allegiance to any leader and that their sense of authority emerges via group consensus decision-making. Yoism adopted the Creative Commons Attribution-ShareAlike copyleft license for sharing original works in May 2015.

=== Dudeism ===
Dudeism is a religion based mainly on Taoism and Epicureanism, but which uses the film The Big Lebowski as its primary liturgical vehicle. It has no strict doctrine and instead invites its ministers and followers to help decide its tenets. Its founder has frequently referred to Dudeism as an "open-source religion".

== See also ==
- Missionary Church of Kopimism
- Arts & Crafts Movement and DIY ethic
- Chaos magic
- The Commons
- Copyright
- Crowdsourcing and User generated content
- Cybersectarianism
- Free content and Open content
- Free-culture movement
- License compatibility
- Open-source license
- Public domain
