= Variable data publishing =

Variable-data publishing (VDP) (also known as database publishing) is a term referring to the output of a variable composition system. While these systems can produce both electronically viewable and hard-copy (print) output, the "variable-data publishing" term today often distinguishes output destined for electronic viewing, rather than that which is destined for hard-copy print (e.g. variable data printing).

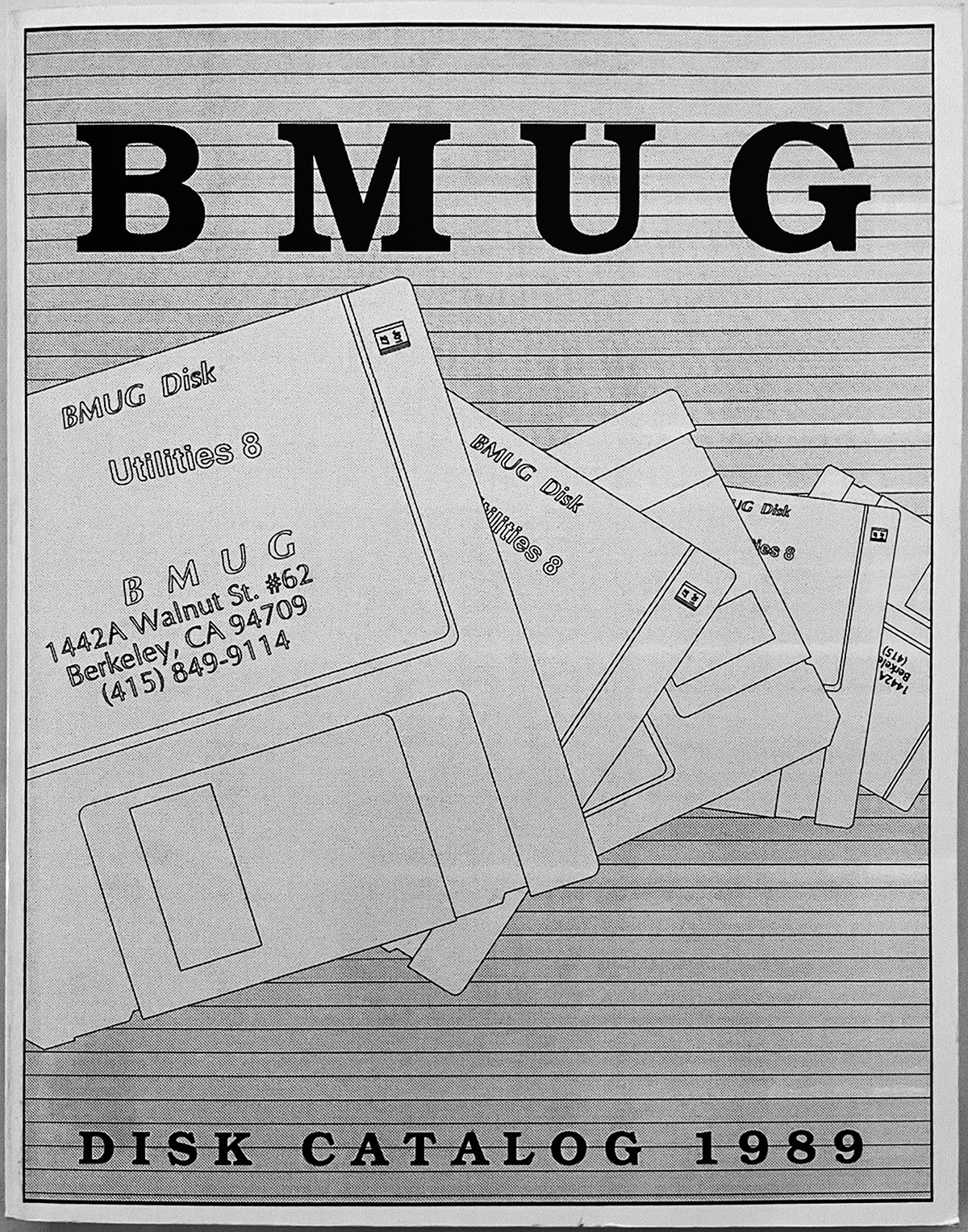
BMUG Disk Catalog 1989, the first known example of direct database-to-negative publishing. Programmer Greg Dow and prepress expert Bill Woodcock published the annual catalog of BMUG's software archive using Nashoba FileMaker output display templates on Macintosh computers to image direct to film from which the plates were burned, on a Linotronic 300 imagesetter. Frontispieces were made in Adobe Illustrator 88 and interleaved in plate compositing. It was set in Adobe Bookman, and printed in grayscale at a 60-line screen for an intentionally minimalist effect.

Essentially the same techniques are employed to perform variable-data publishing, as those utilized with variable data printing. The difference is in the interpretation for output. While variable-data printing may be interpreted to produce various print streams or page-description files (e.g. AFP/IPDS, PostScript, PCL), variable-data publishing produces electronically viewable files, most commonly seen in the forms of PDF, HTML, or XML.

Variable-data composition involves the use of data to conditionally:

- exhibit text (static blocks and/or variable content)
- exhibit images
- select fonts
- select colors
- format page layouts & flows

Variable-data may be as simple as an address block or salutation. However, it can be any or all of the document's textual content—including words, sentences, paragraphs, pages, or the entire document. In other words, it can make up as little or as much of the document as the composer desires. Variable data may also be used to exhibit various images, such as logos, products, or membership photos. Further, variable-data can be used to build rule-based design schemes, including fonts, colors, and page formats. The possibilities are vast.

The variable-data tools available today, make it possible to perform variable-data composition at nearly every stage of document production. However, the level of control that can be achieved varies, based upon how far into the document production process a variable-data tool is deployed. For example, if variable-data insertion occurs just prior to output...it's not likely that the text flow or layout can be altered with nearly as much control as would be available at the time of initial document composition.

Many organizations will produce multiple forms of output (a.k.a. multi-channel output), for the same document. This ensures that the published content is available to recipients via any form of access method they might require. When multi-channel output is utilized, integrity between those output channels often becomes important.

Variable-data publishing may be performed on everything from a personal computer to a mainframe system. However, the speed and practical output volumes which can be achieved are directly affected by the computer power utilized.

== Origin of the concept ==
The term variable-data publishing was likely an offshoot of the term "variable-data printing", first introduced to the printing industry by Frank Romano, Professor Emeritus, School of Print Media, at the College of Imaging Arts and Sciences at Rochester Institute of Technology. However, the concept of merging static document elements and variable document elements predates the term and has seen various implementations ranging from simple desktop 'mail merge', to complex mainframe applications in the financial and banking industry. In the past, the term VDP has been most closely associated with digital printing machines. However, in the past 3 years the application of this technology has spread to web pages, emails, and mobile messaging.

== See also ==
- Variable data printing
- Mass customization
- Dynamic publishing
- Print on demand
- Personalization
