= Litfire Publishing =

Publisher in Atlanta, Georgia

LitFire Publishing
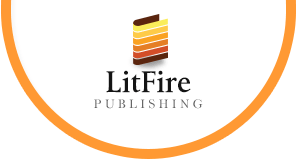
- LitFire Publishing logo
- Status: Active
- Founded: 2008
- Headquarters location: Atlanta, Georgia
- Nonfiction topics: Thriller, horror, religious, inspiration, crime mystery, historical, poetry, business, personal finance, and self-help, how-to
- Fiction genres: Science fiction, fantasy
- Official website: www.litfirepublishing.com

LitFire Publishing is an Atlanta-based provider of book self-publishing services, including design, editorial, marketing, etc. Founded in 2008, it started as a publisher of eBooks. They expanded their services in 2014, wherein they started offering writers the option to self-publish their books. They now help indie authors to self-publish books in physical form (paperback and hardcover) and in digital form (eBook).

== Book publishing and marketing services ==
LitFire offers a print-on-demand service for authors who want printed copies of their books. For digital publishing, authors are offered services like eBook publishing, eBook conversion, and eBook distribution.

As part of the Sponsor of a Youth Program, LitFire signed Barky the Mouse, inspired by 6-year-old kindergartener Carson Stanley. The book started off as an e-book and was later sponsored by LitFire Publishing through a book signing event, where copies of the book were donated to the whole class.
