= Customer communications management =

Software for managing customer communications

Customer communications management (CCM) is software that companies uses to communicate with their customers. Originally, customer communications referred to printed documents, archived digital documents, and email. Organizations' digital transformation of customer communications expanded communication distribution including SMS, in-app notifications, responsive design mobile experiences and messages over common social media platforms.

== History ==
Before the term CCM was used, this technology was referred to as Variable Data Printing (VDP) or Variable Data Publishing. The term "Trans Promo", short for "Trans Promotional", was in use as the term "VDP" gave way to "CCM" in industry-generated content.

Initial CCM concepts focused on the utilization of company system generated transactional documents. These documents such as bank statements, statements of account, invoices, and other customer transactional documents were viewed as ideal customer touchpoints to promote company products to customers. Transactional documents are opened and read by more than 90% of consumers. In competitive markets, the average consumer encounters numerous advertisements, e-mails, direct mail, and solicitations daily. Employing personalized communication strategies can result in repeat buying customers.

== Components ==
All CCM technologies feature design interfaces that primarily use a visual layout software to define the structure of the communication. These design interfaces create a basic visual structure of a communication that is later populated by a production engine with data, variably created data, static content elements, rules-driven content elements, externally referenced content and other elements to create a finished customer communication.

There are varying degrees of sophistication that CCM design interfaces handle, depending on the business needs. Some design environments are simple cloud-based interfaces that create communications for quick and easy marketing communications. There are more comprehensive interfaces that can support complex applications like insurance policy generation that require the skills and expertise of many business experts.

Most CCM technologies offer data extraction capabilities that allow marketers and businesses to combine data from multiple systems across their business to perform customer analysis before composing communications. This allows marketers to evaluate the marketing mix and position individual products to the customer in respect of relevance to the customer or the results of purchase propensity model by applying rules on content elements within the design.

The process results in the creation of a data model, data acquisition and decision rules. These enable a document composition engine to follow its own set of document application rules, constructing individual documents on the basis of data items contained within an individual's data record. The Document Composition engine usually produces either a print stream or, XML data.

Post-processing can be utilized to prepare a print job for production and distribution. This may include tasks such as the application of barcodes to deliver individual mail piece instructions to the inserters and to vary these in terms of the actual inserter being used. For example, one manufacturer's inserter may require different barcode instructions to complete the same task than another.

Print Management software controls the routing and distribution of print jobs to either a single production printer or a fleet of production printers. Print management software also provides a mechanism for assured delivery (ensuring that all pages get printed) through communication and feedback from print devices. Analysis of resultant data provides insight useful for Document Production Managers.

== See also ==
- Document automation
- Customer experience
- Customer-relationship management
