= Xpertdoc =

Canada-based business software company

Xpertdoc Technologies Inc. is a global company, established in 2000, which provides document automation and customer communications management services. Xpertdoc is headquartered in Terrebonne, Quebec, Canada. The company has developed Xpertdoc, which provides capabilities for management of documents, building Microsoft word templates, digital data capture, and general content management. It leverages Microsoft's products, such as Word, Dynamics CRM, SharePoint and Microsoft Azure. Xpertdoc is mainly targeted towards insurance companies, but is also suitable for government and the banking, financial, manufacturing, and real-estate industries.

== Founders ==
Francis Dion, Chief Executive Officer, and Eveline d'Orvilliers, Vice-President, are both founders of Xpertdoc.

== History ==
In 2000, Francis Dion and Eveline d'Orvilliers founded Process Academy Inc. Seven years later, the company was renamed Xpertdoc Technologies, following the arrival of a new Word file format, the .docx, which was introduced by Microsoft under the Office Open XML standard. The company launched Xpertdoc Studio 2007, a tool that integrates with Microsoft Word and allows the production of automated business documents. The same year, Xpertdoc was certified a Microsoft Gold partner.

In 2009, Xpertdoc received financial support from private investors and from local and government funding agencies; the company doubled in size and its market expanded across Canada, the United States, Europe, Asia and the Middle East. Xpertdoc launched the online service Word as a Service. This portal automated the creation of business documents and converts Word files to e-mail and PDF format. Founder and CEO, Francis Dion, is named "business economic personality of the year."

The next year, Xpertdoc was nominated at the Concours des Octas 2010, an annual event organised by Réseau Action TI. Its software, developed in collaboration with Aon, was nominated in the "Business Solution - Packages" category. Xpertdoc, as well as a number of organizations and companies from the Lanaudière region (just north of Montreal) launch the TIenrégion.com website. This magazine blog for information technology specialists aims to promote work and companies in the region.

In 2012, Barack Obama's health care reform, the Patient Protection and Affordable Care Act, prompted Xpertdoc to develop a cloud solution to help Health Insurers meet the production requirements of the standardized reports mandate.

A year later, Xpertdoc recoded the architecture of its Customer Communications Software, which it programmed in HTML5 to make it compatible with mobile devices. The company's change in software for Dynamics CRM received the Microsoft Dynamics certification. The company also partnered with the Insurance Services Office (ISO) and the American Association of Insurance Services (AAIS), which allows property and casualty clients to have access to standardised forms issued by the American organizations.

In September 2013, the analyst firm Strategy Meets Action announced that Xpertdoc has won the SMA Innovation in Action 2013 award in the Solutions Providers category for its patent-pending forms and template migration program. The company also won the Technology Innovation award, given during the Gala du 30e Reflet économique des Moulins.

In 2014, Xpertdoc partnered with Adminovate. Together, they offer life insurance companies a cloud-based service that integrates the former's Customer Communications Management platform with the latter's policy administration system (PAS). OneShield also partners with the Canadian company, bringing to the market a joint PAS and document management solution offering for Property and Casualty insurers. Xpertdoc received the XCelent Functionality award from Celent, an analyst firm, for the functionality and configurability of its software as a whole.

In 2015, Xpertdoc achieved compliance with ISO/IEC 27001:2013 – an information security standard. In November, the company received the MercadOr Award for Market Diversification from the Société de développement international de Lanaudière (SODIL), in recognition of its global expansion. It expanded its market in both the American and Canadian insurance industries.

At the beginning of 2016, Xpertdoc received a patent from the U.S. Patent and Trademark Office for its proprietary document migration technology. It announced expansion of its C-suite with the addition of three executives. In August, Xpertdoc won the Silver Partner Award, granted by the International Association of Microsoft Channel Partners (IAMCP), and joined Microsoft's Enterprise Cloud Alliance. With a five-year revenue growth of 460%, the company ranked 148 on Canadian Business's 2016 PROFIT 500. It moved headquarters in a new building.

In 2017, Xpertdoc's employees formed a cooperative of employee shareholders through which they collectively own 16% of the company's shares. Its Customer Communications Management platform for Microsoft Dynamics CRM is available to Canadian government agencies under the Government of Canada Software Licensing Supply Arrangement (SLSA). Ranked 135 on the 2017 PROFIT 500, Xpertdoc secured $2.3 million in mezzanine financing from BDC Capital.

In 2022, it was announced that Experlogix, LLC had acquired Xpertdoc Technologies, Inc.
