= Transaction printing =

Transaction Printing describes a mode of submitting a job to a printing device.

A digital printing system is attached to a computer database and many similar pages, called forms, are printed; each, for example, with a different person's data filling the form such as a monthly telephone or cable bill.

Simply stated, transaction printing is the printing of multiple transactions for each customer along with the fixed line details like name and address. This is more used in BFSI sectors, for example, bank statements.

Transaction printing jobs are similar to, but often more complex than variable data printing jobs such as mail merge. Transaction printing frequently requires customized formatting to present transaction data in a printable and customer-readable format.

Currently, printing applications are designed to print transactional details along with the external information (not available in the transaction database), often involving promotional material.

Transaction print jobs are different from 'publishing' print jobs in that the print controller does not know when the job will end when it starts. A transactional print job may involve a hundred, a thousand, or a few million impressions. Many digital printing system's controllers are designed to ingest the entire job, arrange its resources according to the size of the job and then begin printing the job last page first so that what is produced is a 'book' with the user seeing the first page first. This 'publishing' model obviously does not work for 'transaction' printing and a controller using a different internal model for jobs must be used.
