= Daniel Smokler =

Rabbi Daniel Smokler was the Chief Innovation Officer of Hillel International .

He received a B.A. in History of Art Cum Laude with distinction from Yale University, where he received the Walter Louis Erich Memorial Prize as the outstanding student in the History of Art. In 1997, Smokler founded Jews in the Woods, a multi-denominational gathering of college students for learning, prayer and reflection on social issues. He spent several years after college working as a union organizer. Smokler received his rabbinic ordination from Rabbis Zalman Nechemia Goldberg and Yaakov Moshe Poupko in 2006. In 2008, Smokler founded Hillel's Senior Jewish Educator Initiative with a grant from the Jim Joseph Foundation. Smokler served as director of education and engagement at the Bronfman Center for Jewish Student Life at NYU from 2008-2014. In 2011, he was named as one of the top "36 under 36" by The Jewish Week.
