= Daniel Kriegman =

American psychologist and writer

Daniel Kriegman (born 1951) is an American psychologist and writer whose work focuses on the interface between psychoanalysis and evolutionary biology. He was a faculty member at the Massachusetts Institute for Psychoanalysis, a founder of the Psychoanalytic Couple and Family Institute of New England, and a creative consultant for the Edgeline Films (Showtime) docu-series "Couples Therapy." Dr. Kriegman was formerly Chief Psychologist and the Director of Supervision and Training at the Massachusetts Treatment Center for Sexually Dangerous Offenders, as well as the Clinical Director for the maximum-security, intensive-treatment unit for adolescents in Boston.

Kriegman is co-author, with Malcolm Slavin, of The Adaptive Design of the Human Psyche: Psychoanalysis, Evolutionary Biology, and the Therapeutic Process, a book about the psychoanalytic paradigm known as evolutionary psychoanalysis, and co-editor, with J. G. Teicholz, of Trauma, Repetition, & Affect Regulation: The Work of Paul Russell. He has published over 30 scholarly articles and book chapters on topics related to the evolutionary understanding of human behavior and the theory and practice of psychoanalytic approaches to psychotherapy.

He has a full-time private practice providing psychoanalytic treatment to individuals, couples, and families in Newton, Massachusetts, as well as specialized work in forensic psychology (e.g., expert witness testimony in cases involving the prediction of dangerousness).

He was the founder of Zuzu's Place, which tried to develop a cooperative housing alternative (in Whitman, Massachusetts) to the mental health system for people who had been diagnosed with major mental illnesses.

Kriegman is also one of the founders of an open source religion called Yoism and is the author of "The Word according to Yo."

== Selected works ==
=== Books ===
- The Adaptive Design of the Human Psyche: Psychoanalysis, Evolutionary Biology, and the Therapeutic Process, with Malcolm Slavin ISBN 0-89862-795-8 (Guilford Press, 1992).
- Trauma, Repetition, & Affect Regulation: The Work of Paul Russell. Teicholz, J. G. & Kriegman, D. (Eds.), 1998. New York: The Other Press.
- THE BOOK OF WAR: The Evolutionary Biology of Racism, Religious Hatred, Nationalism, Terrorism, and Genocide ISBN 979-8989740505

=== Doctoral thesis ===
- A Psycho-social Study of Religious Cults From the Perspective of Self Psychology (University Microfilms International, 1980)
