= Jews in the Woods =

Jewish youth group

Jews in the Woods (JITW or JitW) also referred to as Fruity Jews or Fruity Jews in the Woods is a privately organized Jewish youth group. It has hosted a number of Shabbaton meetings whereby young Jews gather to observe the Shabbat (the Jewish Sabbath) in a formalized manner. The group began in New England in 1997 and held its most recent event in Connecticut in 2013.

== History ==
The group was founded by two friends, Dan Smokler and Dan Zimmerman who sought to create a Jewish community that evoked their Hassidic teacher Josh Lauffer's shabbat gatherings. Zimmerman has also cited the famous gatherings of the sainted Rebbe of Szebreszhin as an inspiration for the gathering. JITW has come to be known for its serene, wooded locations, intense praying and singing, and the musical, lyrical and terpsichorean geniuses who frequent its gatherings. It has been described as both neo-Hasidic and post-denominational.

The original gathering in 1997 was relatively small, consisting of friends that the three founders had made at their universities, and on two Israel summer programs: Nesiya, and the Bronfman Youth Fellowships. The following year there were over 100 attendees from the North East and beyond. Following this event, the organizers decided that they needed to limit the size of the gatherings for the sake of intimacy; consequently, future gatherings hosted between 60 and 70 people.

In 2000 and in 2001, the JitW gathering was held in Plainfield, MA. Most of the original Jews in the Woods organizers graduated from college in 2001. The following year a gathering was held in New York City with many of the original JITW group.

A scene at the sixth gathering.

In 2003, Ben Bregman from Brown University, who had been at the pre-hiatus gatherings, decided to organize a return to the woods. Co-coordinating it with Joseph Gindi from Wesleyan University, the two wanted to bring the spirit of the original Jews in the Woods gatherings to their friends. During the planning of this fifth retreat some important changes occurred. Jews in the Woods began to be organized in a more multi-denominational, transparent way.

The three-part davening space, known as a "meshlishah" or "tri-chitzah", was introduced as were a variety of compromises designed to make the community increasingly inclusive for participants from all Jewish denominations. This gathering was small but included many of the folks who helped with the rebirth.

In the fall of 2003, Brown Students Ari Johnson and Zach Teutsch took over leadership. They used tools to increase transparency including a wiki and a yahoo group listserv. These tools replaced the constantly changing list of e-mails. The process of making the JitW community more egalitarian is still ongoing. As with the 2003 Jews in the Woods gathering, the process evolved to include pluralism as a key value. While Johnson and Teutsch were coordinating, the shabbatonim grew from approximately 20 to over a hundred. Many progressive projects sprung out of the community as a result of its emphasis on possibility and its impact is beginning to be seen on the young American Jewish community.

With numbers growing by over 125% each time, gatherings 9 and 10 in the spring of 2005 became the first time multiple JitW shabbatonim were organized in a single semester. The spring of 2006 saw the first gathering in Israel. The JitW experience was introduced to an older group of Anglo Jews learning in Israel, many of whom were working toward degrees in Jewish communal leadership. In March 2012, the most recent gathering took place in Rhode Island, attended by 60 students and organized by one Brown student and one Yale student.

JITW has grown dramatically, and while still unofficial, has acquired a following at university Hillels around the country, and has served as the inspiration for the Kavod Social Justice House. The group has received attention from various bloggers, especially for their use of a wiki in organization and decision-making. In "Mah Rabu's" series on "Hilchot Pluralism" Jews in the Woods is heralded for popularizing the three-sectioned prayer system. Jews in the Woods was also profiled in the major US Jewish newspaper, The Forward devoted to the issues surrounding boundaries and community.
