= Parrhesia =

Rhetoric practice

In rhetoric, parrhesia (Greek: παρρησία) is candid speech, speaking freely. It implies not only freedom of speech, but the obligation to speak the truth for the common good, even at personal risk.

== Etymology ==
The earliest recorded use of the term parrhesia is by Euripides in the fifth century B.C. Parrhesia means literally "to speak everything" and by extension "to speak freely", "to speak boldly", or "boldness".

== Usage in ancient Greece ==
In the Classical period, parrhesia was a fundamental component of the Athenian democracy. In the courts or the Ecclesia, the assembly of citizens, Athenians were free to say almost anything. In the Dionysia, playwrights such as Aristophanes made full use of their right to ridicule whomever they chose.

Outside of the theatre or government however, there were limits to what might be said; freedom to discuss politics, morals, religion, or to criticize people would depend upon the context: by whom it was said, and when, and how, and where. If one was seen as immoral, or held views that went contrary to popular opinion, then there were great risks involved in making use of such an unrestricted freedom of speech, such as being charged with impiety (asebeia). This was the pretext under which Socrates was executed in 399 BCE, for dishonoring the gods and corrupting the young. Though perhaps Socrates was punished for his close association with many of the participants in the Athenian coup of 411 BC, because it was believed that Socrates' philosophical teachings had served as an intellectual justification for their seizure of power.

In later Hellenistic philosophy, parrhesia was a defining characteristic of the Cynic philosophers, as epitomized in the shamelessness of Diogenes of Sinope. According to Philodemus, parrhesia is also used by the Epicureans in the form of frank criticism of each other that is intended to help the target of criticism achieve the cessation of pain and reach a state of ataraxia.

In the Greek New Testament, parrhesia is the ability of Jesus or his followers to hold their own in discourse before political and religious authorities such as the Pharisees.

== Usage in rabbinic Jewish writings ==
Parrhesia appears in Midrashic literature as a condition for the transmission of Torah. Connoting open and public communication, parrhesia appears in combination with the term δῆμος (dimus, short for dimosia), translated coram publica, in the public eye, i.e. open to the public. As a mode of communication it is repeatedly described in terms analogous to a commons. Parrhesia is closely associated with an ownerless wilderness of primary mytho-geographic import, the Midbar Sinai in which the Torah was initially received. The dissemination of Torah thus depends on its teachers cultivating a nature that is as open, ownerless, and sharing as that wilderness. The term is important to advocates of Open Source Judaism. Here is the text from the Mekhilta where the term dimus parrhesia appears (see bolded text).

"ויחנו במדבר" (שמות פרק יט פסוק ב) נתנה תורה דימוס פרהסייא במקום הפקר, שאלו נתנה בארץ ישראל, היו אומרים לאומות העולם אין להם חלק בה, לפיכך נתנה במדבר דימוס פרהסייא במקום הפקר, וכל הרוצה לקבל יבא ויקבל...

Torah was given over dimus parrhesia in a maqom hefker (a place belonging to no one). For had it been given in the Land of Israel, they would have had cause to say to the nations of the world, "you have no share in it." Thus was it given dimus parrhesia, in a place belonging to no one: "Let all who wish to receive it, come and receive it!"

Explanation: Why was the Torah not given in the land of Israel? In order that the peoples of the world should not have the excuse for saying: "Because it was given in Israel's land, therefore we have not accepted it."

...דבר אחר: שלא להטיל מחלוקת בין השבטים שלא יהא זה אומר בארצי נתנה תורה וזה אומר בארצי נתנה תורה לפיכך נתנה תורה במדבר דימוס בפרהסיא במקום הפקר, בשלשה דברים נמשלה תורה במדבר באש ובמים לומר לך מה אלו חנם אף דברי תורה חנם לכל באי עולם.

Another reason: To avoid causing dissension among the tribes [of Israel]. Else one might have said: In my land the Torah was given. And the other might have said: In my land the Torah was given. Therefore, the Torah was given in the Midbar (wilderness, desert), dimus parrhesia, in a place belonging to no one. To three things the Torah is likened: to the Midbar, to fire, and to water. This is to tell one that just as these three things are free to all who come into the world, so also are the words of the Torah free to all who come into the world.

The term "parrhesia" is also used in Modern Hebrew (usually spelled פרהסיה), meaning [in] public.

== Modern scholarship ==
Michel Foucault developed the concept of parrhesia as a mode of discourse in which people express their opinions and ideas candidly and honestly, avoiding the use of manipulation, rhetoric, or broad generalizations. Foucault's interpretation of parrhesia is in contrast to the contemporary Cartesian model of requiring irrefutable evidence for truth. Descartes equated truth with the indubitable, believing that what cannot be doubted must be true. Until speech is examined or criticized to see if it is subject to doubt, its truth cannot be evaluated by this standard.

Foucault asserted that the classical Greek concept of parrhesia rested on several criteria. A person who engages in parrhesia is only recognized as doing so if they possess a credible connection to the truth. This entails acting as a critic of either oneself, popular opinions, or societal norms. The act of revealing this truth exposes the individual to potential risks, yet the critic persists in speaking out due to a moral, social, or political responsibility. Additionally, in public contexts, a practitioner of parrhesia should hold a less empowered social position compared to those to whom the truth is being conveyed.

Foucault described the classic Greek parrhesiastes as someone who takes a risk by speaking honestly, even when it might lead to negative consequences. This risk is not always about life-threatening situations. For instance, when someone tells a friend that they are doing something wrong, knowing it might make them angry and harm the friendship, that person is acting as a parrhesiastes. Parrhesia is closely tied to having the courage to speak the truth despite potential dangers, including social repercussions, political scandal, or even matters of life and death.

Parrhesia involves speaking openly. This involves a distinct connection to truth via honesty, a link to personal life through facing danger, a certain interaction with oneself or others through critique, and a specific relationship with moral principles through freedom and responsibility. Specifically, it is a form of speaking where the speaker shares their personal truth, even risking their life because they believe truth-telling is a duty to help others and themselves. In parrhesia, the speaker opts for honesty over persuasion, truth over falsehood or silence, the risk of death over safety, criticism over flattery, and moral obligation over self-interest or indifference.

The parrhesiastes speaks without reservation. For instance, Demosthenes, in his discourses "On the False Embassy" and "First Philippic", emphasizes the importance of speaking with parrhesia, without holding back or hiding anything.

== See also ==
- Ad libitum
- Satyagraha
- Sincerity
- Speaking truth to power
