= Nesiya =

Independent non-profit organization based in Jerusalem and New York City

The Nesiya Institute

Nesiya, from the Hebrew "נסיעה", meaning "journey", is an independent, year-round, non-profit organization based in Jerusalem and New York City. The Nesiya Institute is not affiliated with any movement within Judaism and is committed to exploring differences among diverse Jews in order to develop Jewish leaders and invigorate Jewish life.

Its programs focus on key areas of personal and communal development, including leadership, self-expression, Judaism, and Israel. The Nesiya model of experiential learning combines community building, outdoor adventure, creative text study, community service, and the arts.

Nesiya alumni and staff make up a growing community of artists, educators and activists in North America and Israel. A notable Nesiya graduate is the musician Regina Spektor.

== Core programs ==
Nesiya's three core programs are:

- The Kehillah Summer Program, a six-week Israel program for North American and Israeli high school students.
- The Winter Retreat, a week-long arts and text-based program in North America, with enrichment and educational leadership training for high school, college, and post-college age young adults.
- The Kehillah Fellows Program, an academic-year community service and learning program for religious and secular Israeli high school students, with training for post-army Israelis as experiential educators.

Nesiya also conducts a wide range of initiatives, including: programs for Jewish high schools; college leadership programs; and programs for educators, lay leaders, and families. Since its first program in 1985, over 2,500 North American and Israeli young people have participated in Nesiya programs.

The Nesiya Institute has benefited from the support of the Andrea and Charles Bronfman Foundation, the Nathan Cummings Foundation, Steven Spielberg's Righteous Persons Foundation, the New York - UJA Federation, the Rainbow-Keshet Foundation, the Horowitz Ratner Family, Susie and Michael Gelman, the Lopatin Family Foundation, the Schwarz Family, Joan and Robert H. Arnow, and private donors.
