= Mail merge =

Tool for mass mailings from a form letter

Mail merge consists of combining mail and letters and pre-addressed envelopes or mailing labels for mass mailings from a form letter.

This feature is usually employed in a word processing document which contains fixed text (which is the same in each output document) and variables (which act as placeholders that are replaced by text from the data source word to word).

Some word processors can insert content from a database, spreadsheet, or table into text documents.

It is a tool for writing a "personalized" letter or e-mail to many people at the same time. It imports data from another source such as a spreadsheet and then uses that to replace placeholders throughout the message with the relevant information for each individual that is being messaged.

== History ==
Mail merge dates back to early word processors on personal computers, circa 1980. WordStar was perhaps the earliest to provide this, originally via an ancillary program called Mail merge. WordPerfect also offered this capacity for CP/M and MS-DOS systems; Microsoft Word added it later on, as did Multimate.

== Advanced features ==
Money can be saved by pre-sorting on zip code and grouping by postal-discount requirements (same ZIP code, same SCF).

A paperless approach is to use mail merge to format email.

Going beyond words, in 2018 The New York Times detailed a further instance of "mass customization" - personalized videos.

== Overview ==
The data source is typically a table in a document, or a spreadsheet or database which has a field or column for each variable in the template. When the word processor's mail merge is run it creates an output document for each row in the data source, using the fixed text from the data source.

The mail merging process generally requires the following steps:

1. Creating a main document template.
2. Creating a data source.
3. Defining the merge fields in the main document template.
4. Merging the data source with the main document template.
5. Saving/exporting.

A common usage is for creating "personalized" letters, where a template is created, with a field for "Given Name", for example. The templated letter says "Dear <Given Name>", and when executed, the mail merge creates a letter for each record in the database, so it appears the letter is more personal. It is often used for variable data printing. It can also be used to create address labels from a customer relationship management database, or for mass emails with pertinent information in them, perhaps a username and password.

== See also ==
- Desktop publishing
- Digital printing
- Dynamic publishing
- Mass customization
- Word processors
