= PresenTense Group =

American Jewish social entrepreneurship organization (2005–2017)

- Formation: 2005
- Defunct: 2017 (U.S. programs merged into UpStart); 2018 (Israeli operations ceased)
- Type: Nonprofit organization
- Headquarters: Jerusalem, Israel; New York, New York, United States
- Key people: Ariel Beery (co-founder); Aharon Horwitz (co-founder)
- Website: presentense.org (defunct)

The PresenTense Group was an American and Israeli nonprofit organization that trained and supported Jewish social entrepreneurs through fellowship programs, accelerators, and workshops. Founded in December 2005 as a print magazine in New York City, it evolved into a global network of community-based venture accelerators operating across North America, Israel, and Eastern Europe. Its U.S.-based programs merged into UpStart in 2017, and its Israeli operations ceased activity by 2018.

== Founding ==
PresenTense was conceived in late 2005 by Ariel Beery and Aharon Horwitz, two Columbia University graduates who had previously co-founded Columbians for Academic Freedom, a student organization that campaigned on behalf of pro-Israel students at Columbia. Beery, who had served in the Israeli army before attending Columbia, founded the magazine in response to what he described as a lack of nuanced discourse about Israel on campus and a desire to create space for young Jews to articulate diverse expressions of Jewish identity.

The magazine was started in Morningside Heights, Manhattan on a shoestring budget. After months of unsuccessful attempts to raise $10,000 for the first print run, Beery and Horwitz printed 1,000 copies of what they called "Issue Zero" using $5,000 from a friend and mentor, with the remainder carried as credit card debt. The magazine eventually reached a circulation of 30,000.

== Pivot to accelerator model ==
Within a couple of years, Beery and Horwitz observed that the magazine's contributors were not merely writing about Jewish innovation but actively pursuing it. In June 2007, they launched what they initially called the PresenTense Institute for Creative Zionism (PICZ) — a six-week summer fellowship in Jerusalem for a small cohort of Jewish social entrepreneurs. The founders maxed out their credit cards to run the first institute, which included Bible Raps founder Matt Barr and Challah for Hunger founder Eli Winkelman among its inaugural fellows. Esther Kustanowitz served on the steering committee.

The Jerusalem program, which became known as the PresenTense Global Summer Institute, ran annually in Jerusalem. By its sixth iteration in 2012 it was bringing together approximately 16 fellows from around the world for an intensive six-week program of workshops, mentorship, and meetings with Israeli business, arts, and technology figures, culminating in a public "Launch Night" pitch event.

The organization received official nonprofit status in 2010. In 2009, Boston's Combined Jewish Philanthropies approached PresenTense to adapt its model for local use, marking the beginning of a community partnership model in which local Jewish federations and community organizations licensed the PresenTense curriculum and ran their own cohorts of fellows, with PresenTense providing training and support.

== Programs ==
PresenTense operated on two tracks. The Global Summer Institute in Jerusalem accepted a small international cohort each summer for an intensive six-week residency. The community accelerator programs were run in partnership with local Jewish organizations across North America, Israel, and Eastern Europe, with each community adapting the PresenTense curriculum to local needs. PresenTense provided the training framework and coaching; it did not provide grants or funding to fellows.

By 2014 the organization reported running 15 accelerator programs across North America, Eastern Europe, and Israel, supporting 180 entrepreneurs and 164 ventures in that year alone. PresenTense also ran PTSchool, a platform of training workshops for established Jewish organizations seeking to develop internal innovation capacity.

Over its operating history the organization reported supporting more than 1,500 social ventures. These figures were self-reported and cumulative across all years and programs. A 2013 Times of Israel article cited PresenTense's own marketing director as saying that 70 percent of past ventures were still operating at that time.

Among the inaugural 2007 fellows was Eli Winkelman, founder of Challah for Hunger, a student-run nonprofit that bakes and sells challah to raise money for hunger relief. Challah for Hunger had been founded in 2004 at Scripps College, prior to Winkelman's participation in the PresenTense program.

== Israeli operations ==
PresenTense maintained a presence in Israel independently of its North American programs. In 2016 it received a grant of approximately 1.5 million NIS from the Citi Foundation to run programs in Haifa and Jaffa targeting Arab social entrepreneurs, with the aim of broadening access to the Israeli startup ecosystem beyond Tel Aviv.

== Merger and closure ==
By the mid-2010s, PresenTense was one of several overlapping Jewish social entrepreneurship support organizations competing for grants from the same pool of foundations. In November 2016 UpStart, Bikkurim, Joshua Venture Group, and the U.S.-based programs of PresenTense announced a merger, consolidating into a single organization under the UpStart name. The merger was completed in spring 2017. PresenTense's global operations, including its Israeli programs, were explicitly excluded from the merger and continued separately under the PresenTense name.

UpStart CEO Aaron Katler noted at the time of the merger that the fragmentation of the field had created gaps for participants: "Someone who participated in a PresenTense program did not know where to go next. You'd leave the accelerator and not know what you could apply for next."

IRS filings show that the PresenTense Group had no activity in fiscal year 2018, indicating that its remaining Israeli and global operations effectively ceased around that time.

UpStart continues to operate as of 2026, running tiered accelerator programs for Jewish social entrepreneurs across the United States.

== See also ==
- Ariel Beery
- UpStart (organization)
- Jewish social entrepreneurship
- ROI Community
- Birthright Israel
