= Web-to-print =

Commercial printing using web sites

Web-to-print, also known as Web2Print, remote publishing or print e-commerce is commercial printing using web sites. Companies and software solutions that deal in web-to-print use standard e-commerce and online services like hosting, website design, and cross-media marketing.

Partners and customers may submit print jobs, do online pre-press reviews/previews, design things like postcards directly on a website using rich user interfaces, direct cross-media marketing and offer services such as variable data printing, photo printing, booklets, and marketing campaigns.

== Overview ==
Web-to-print sites are available for commercial users or to the general public. A common offering from print houses is public or private online storefronts or catalogues.

Web-to-print increasingly calls for a Portable Document Format (PDF) workflow environment with output provided by digital printing; although there is certainly no requirement that fulfillment be accomplished using digital production equipment; web-to-print is also used today by printers with both offset and digital production facilities.

Prepress reviews can be done online, allowing a print house, a client, and possibly a graphic designer to create, edit, and approve computer-based online artwork.

Some web-to-print sites offer online print products that replace editing tools like Adobe InDesign where buyers can author work and alter the typeface, copy, images, and layout. These products often include a library of templates for product types, such as postcards, posters, flyers etc.

It is frequently possible for clients to upload their own unique content for automated print production. This may be termed Ad Hoc printing. When a digital press is used for the final output, the template usually is transformed into a PDF file that serves as the ‘master plate’ for the digital press. In more traditional printing processes, like offset printing, the template is used to create a plate or plates that are used to produce the final printed product.

Web-to-print sites often provide approval mechanism so that managers can approve print requests by their employees.

Materials produced by a web-to-print process include business cards, brochures, and stationery, among other printed matter, that can be printed in full color or in black and white on various papers and on various presses.

Web-to-print systems are also expanding to handle personalization and distribution of other marketing materials such as presentations, seminars, logo items, and even email and other electronic media. This change is driven by enterprise clients seeking a single repository/tool to manage all marketing efforts including print.

== Comparisons and differences ==
The front-end of the web-to-print process is similar to desktop publishing (DTP) in that individuals or graphic designers use desktop publishing software to create pre-defined templates. These templates are then posted online for later customization by end-users and automated production by a print house or commercial printer. Unlike DTP, web-to-print can bypass the use of traditional design tools by the end-user as the templates utilized in this process are based upon a WYSIWYG (often browser-based) interface that can be edited and approved by a client and by the print house without a graphic designer’s assistance.

Commercial web-to-print applications can include both print on demand (POD) or pre-printed materials that are pulled from inventory. POD documents can have static content or include elements of variable data printing (VDP), a form of POD that is mainly used for personalization of marketing materials with product or customer data that is pulled from a database. VDP is geared toward mass customization, whereas web-to-print focuses only on changes made from order to order. VDP pre-dates web-to-print although at that time the design process was carried out via close collaboration with the printer for documents such as invoices.

== Origin of the phrase ==
The origin of the phrase "web to print" is unknown, but an online public example was made by Jim Frew when he used of the phrase in an online article entitled, "From Web to Print," for Webmonkey, an online resource for web designers, on 9 February 1999. This article was geared toward web designers who wanted to know more about DTP and the printing process from commercial, technical, and design aspects. However, the trademark for the phrase actually belongs to Belmark, Inc., a label printing company in De Pere, Wisconsin. Belmark was initially granted this trademark in 1999 and renewed it in January 2011.

The use of the term "web-to-print" from the perspective of a transition between web-driven technology to printed matter means that the term "web" connotes the World Wide Web (WWW), rather than the web that is used as a term for a web rotary press developed by William Bullock. Bullock’s web press revolutionized newspaper printing, and the WWW is now used to alter how corporations and individuals create commercial and personal printed matter.

The term has become ubiquitous, as businesses have picked upon the "Web2Print" phrase to name software designed specifically to manage the web-to-print process. Graphic design and web design firms that have branched out into print services also use the term to subhead their company trade name, or they use the phrase as a subheading for public relations materials.

== History ==
DTP’s history provides the groundwork for current web-to-print expansion, and the onset of e-commerce between 1998 and 2000 created an environment for web-to-print to prosper. However, web-to-print and the framework for it had been well established by commercial developments in some years before this. For instance Xerox Corporation (one of the companies that has been attributed to the origins of the Internet) had a commercial product available for sale in 1995 called InterDoc, which is described as software that allowed printing departments to receive and produce digital file submissions from customers over the Internet.

== Advantages and disadvantages ==
Advantages to the use of a web-to-print system include the ability for print houses, graphic designers, corporate clients, and the general public to access a private or public online catalog where last-minute changes to a prepress template are possible. Within this process, the client can approve the materials without the need for a face-to-face meeting with the printer. Additionally, templates allow print customers to control brand management and content, as portions of a constantly used template can remain consistent throughout a series of print projects. Many vendors also utilize workflow managers that combine the connectivity of web-to-print with organization tools that simplify the complex printing process. This system is often cost-effective for clients and time-effective for print houses.

The disadvantage to this system as it exists today is that small- to mid-sized print houses and print brokers are limited in their access to software and server system solutions for a web-to-print service offering to clients. To mitigate this, some vendors are using tool editors that allow users to use only the tools that are most important to their business. Most proprietary and trade name software that was developed with web-to-print projects in mind remains prohibitively expensive for this sector. Additionally, these systems often require the use of digital systems that only a larger print house would maintain. However, some companies, such as B2 Portal, are trying to change this.

== Recent developments ==
The main challenge for web-to-print expansion is centered on both the affordability of this solution and software and hardware companies' abilities to converge desktop vector-graphic tools with server technologies designed expressly for a web-to-print goal. While specific software set the stage for major print houses to offer web-to-print services to corporate clients and to the general public, brand name software companies have nudged into this business to offer mid- to high-range solutions.

To address the prohibitive cost of traditional web-to-print software solutions (software, systems, periodic software upgrades, technical staff, ...) noted earlier, providers offer web-to-print as "hosted" or software as a service (SaaS) solutions. Using this model application creation, maintenance, enhancement, technical support, application upgrades, and hosting, are provided as an out-sourced service. Since the software, systems, and support resources are spread over a larger client base, costs can be reduced significantly. This makes it possible for any print house or print broker to offer professional web-to-print applications and services with only a modest investment of time and capital.

SaaS solutions are generally delivered through a purely online environment — allowing them to take advantage of relatively low cost per seat, cross-platform compatibility, multi-user collaboration, and live database integration for product and digital asset management (DAM).

Another option is to find out small and simplified solutions that are able to handle online designing, proofing, quote, invoicing & order management of small & medium size print shop.

Another niche in web-to-print solutions that is seen by some as being an indicator of things to come is the provision of WYSIWYG design support. Products provide such ability by allowing elements within a template to be moved, inserted, and deleted by end-users following strict rules established by the administrator of the system. This type of system begins to blur the lines between Desktop Publishing applications and web-to-print systems, and lets non-designers edit and proof customized artwork within a 'safe' environment.

A new development in the web-to-print world is mobile applications. Followed by the increased usage of smartphones, and the ability to create better software for mobile devices, the ability to use web-to-print services from responsive-design website or even native applications is now available.

An inhibiting factor for print companies when it comes to implementing web-to-print are the technical/personnel challenges associated with the deployment of e-commerce storefronts due to a lack of trained resources. This in turn has given rise to a new breed of companies which offer specific consultancy services enabling print companies to expediently execute upon their web-to-print strategy by outsourcing the design and development of their storefronts whilst also gaining a range of associated services such as sales training. Software companies that sell web-to-print solutions are also becoming ever more aware of the need to add value and educate their audiences in respect of web-to-print strategy so as to aid their sales processes, ensuring that once a web-to-print platform is sold, it can also be successfully deployed.

Up until 2018, there has been a rise in demand for digital printing and web-to-print in particular. However, experts predict possible instability of growth of web-to-print industry in the years to come due to fluctuations in raw material prices, disadvantages of web-to-print, and limitations of PDF.

== See also ==
- Dynamic publishing
