= Dynamic publishing =

Dynamic page publishing is a method of designing publications in which layout templates are created which can contain different content in different publications. Using this method, page designers do not work on finished pages, but rather on various layout templates and pieces of content, which can then be combined to create a number of finished pages. In cases where the same content is being used in multiple layouts, the same layout is being used for several different sets of content, or both, dynamic page publishing can offer significant advantages of efficiency over a traditional system of page-by-page design.

This technology is often leveraged in web-to-print solutions for corporate intranets to enable customization and ordering of printed materials, advertising automation workflows inside of advertising agencies, catalog generation solutions for retailers and variable digital print on demand solutions for highly personalized one to one marketing. The output from these solutions is often printed by a digital printing press.

Dynamic publishing is often considered to be a subset of automated publishing that enables generation of long documents, such as manuals or books from a content repository.

Dynamic publishing is often used to build high value documents, such as ads, collateral, brochures, catalogs, direct mail, eBooks and other documents on demand or in variable data printing workflows.

Dynamic publishing is often associated with XML authoring and technologies related to the Semantic Web initiatives.

== See also ==
- Web-to-print
