= Variable data printing =

Type of on-demand printing in which text and graphics may be altered in-process

Variable data printing (VDP) (also known as variable information printing (VIP) or variable imaging (VI)) is a form of digital printing, including on-demand printing, in which elements such as text, graphics and images may be changed from one printed piece to the next, without stopping or slowing down the printing process and using information from a database or external file. For example, a set of personalized letters, each with the same basic layout, can be printed with a different name and address on each letter. Variable data printing is mainly used for direct marketing, customer relationship management, advertising, invoicing and applying addressing on selfmailers, brochures or postcard campaigns.

== Variable data printing: customization and operational methodologies ==
VDP is a direct outgrowth of digital printing, which harnesses computer databases and digital print devices and highly effective software to create high-quality, full color documents, with a look and feel comparable to conventional offset printing. Variable data printing enables the mass customization of documents via digital print technology, as opposed to the 'mass-production' of a single document using offset lithography. Instead of producing 10,000 copies of a single document, delivering a single message to 10,000 customers, variable data printing could print 10,000 unique documents with customized messages for each customer.

There are several levels of variable printing. The most basic level involves changing the salutation or name on each copy much like mail merge. More complicated variable data printing uses 'versioning', where there may be differing amounts of customization for different markets, with text and images changing for groups of addresses based upon which segment of the market is being addressed. Finally there is full variability printing, where the text and images can be altered for each individual address. All variable data printing begins with a basic design that defines static elements and variable fields for the pieces to be printed. While the static elements appear exactly the same on each piece, the variable fields are filled in with text or images as dictated by a set of application and style rules and the information contained in the database.

There are three main operational methodologies for variable data printing.

In one methodology, a static document is loaded into printer memory. The printer is instructed, through the print driver or raster image processor (RIP) to always print the static document when sending any page out to the printer driver or RIP. Variable data can then be printed on top of the static document. This methodology is the simplest way to execute VDP, however its capability is less than that of a typical mail merge.

A second methodology is to combine the static and variable elements into print files, prior to printing, using standard software. This produces a conventional (and potentially huge) print file with every image being merged into every page. A shortcoming of this methodology is that running many very large print files can overwhelm the RIP's mad processing capability. When this happens, printing speeds might become slow enough to be impractical for a print job of more than a few hundred pages.

A third methodology is to combine the static and variable elements into print files, prior to printing, using specialized VDP software. This produces optimized print files, such as PDF/VT, PostScript or PPML, that maximize print speed since the RIP only needs to process static elements once.

== Software and services ==
There are many software packages available to merge text and images into VDP print files. Some are stand-alone software packages like SYNC Infographic VDP Generator, however most of the advanced VDP software packages are actually plug-in modules for one or more publishing software packages such as Adobe Creative Suite.

Besides VDP software, other software packages may be necessary for VDP print projects. Mailing software is necessary in the United States (United States Postal Service) and Canada to take advantage of reduced postage for bulk mailing. Used prior to the VDP print file creation, mailing software presorts and validates and generates bar codes for mailing addresses. Pieces can then be printed in the proper sequence for sorting by postal code. In Canada, Canada Post now offers a 'Machineable' personalized mail category which does not require addresses to be sorted into any specific order before mailing; therefore reducing the need for specialized sorting software to obtain optimal postage rates.

Software to manage data quality (e.g. for duplicate removal or handling of bad records) and uniformity may also be needed. In lieu of purchasing software, various companies provide an assortment of VDP-related print file, mailing and data services.

== Benefits ==
The difference between variable data printing (VDP) and traditional printing is the personalization that is involved. Personalization allows a company to connect to its customers. Variable data printing is more than a variable name or address in a printed piece; in the past, a variable name would have been effective, because it was a new concept at the time. In today’s world, marketers expect personalization to reflect the interests of the customer. In order for VDP to be successful, the company must first know something about the customer. For example, a customer who loves baseball might be given a VDP postcard containing an image of their favorite baseball player. Compared to a generically printed marketing postcard, such a VDP postcard is more likely to be effective, because the customer is more likely to read the material that it carries. Conversely, an example of an ineffective VDP piece would entail mailing a postcard to the same customer with an image of a soccer player. If the customer has no interest in soccer, then he or she might or might not pay attention to the postcard. The ultimate goal is to attract the customer's attention to a sales pitch of some type, with the intent of generating demand for a product or service (which might be something that the customer has no need for, but which the advertising manages to convince the customer to pay for anyway).

As a communication tool, personalization enables the company to communicate in such a way as to develop business relationships with prospective customers and also to maintain relationships with their current customers. In this way, a prospect who is converted to a customer can then be converted to a loyal customer, who continues to buy goods or services from that company. A company that produces good-quality products or provides useful services will retain the loyal customers that it has created.

Another benefit of VDP is the increase in the response rate and the reduction in response time. Because personalization more effectively catches the attention of the consumer, the response rate of a mail campaign increases. Personalization also decreases the response time, because the mailed piece generally has a more profound and more meaningful effect on the consumer. This effect, in turn, induces the consumer to respond more quickly, especially if the mailed piece contains a call to action such as a time-limited offer with a clearly enunciated deadline. In contrast, a mailed piece that is not eye-catching may instead be set aside and forgotten until a later date. Therefore, in such a case, it might take weeks or longer for a response to be obtained, if one is in fact obtained at all.

== Integration ==
Variable data printing can be combined with other platforms – such as PURLS, email blasts, and QR codes; all three platforms are considered marketing tools. Many people have found the benefit of combining all of these platforms in order to have a successful campaign. Email blasts and PURLS allow a company to find out information about their consumer. An email blasts usually doesn’t contain much personalization, but it can. The bulk of the personalization would be seen in a PURL. A PURL is a personalized uniform resource locator (URL). In short, it is a landing page. It is also where most of the knowledge about the consumer will be gained. The email blasts will contain a PURL, which will lead the consumer to a personalized page. The PURL is where a company can gain information about the consumer through the requested information. The QR code can be added to a mailed piece. It works like an email blasts. It directs the consumer to a website. The integration of these three platforms can help a campaign.

== Origin of the concept ==
The origin of the term variable data printing is widely credited to Frank Romano, Professor Emeritus, School of Print Media, at the College of Imaging Arts and Sciences at Rochester Institute of Technology. Mr. Romano does not explicitly take credit for coining the term but points to his use of it as early as 1969 and its appearance in the 1999 book Personalized and Database Printing that he authored with David Broudy.

The concept of merging static document elements and variable document elements predates the term and has seen various implementations ranging from simple desktop mail merge, to complex mainframe applications in the financial and banking industry. In the past, the term VDP has been most closely associated with digital printing machines. However, in recent years the application of this technology has spread to web pages, emails, and mobile messaging.

== See also ==
- Desktop publishing
- Digital printing
- Dynamic publishing
- Mail merge
- Mass customization
- Offset printing
- Personalization
- Print on demand
- Transaction printing
- Variable data publishing
