= 2010–11 First Vienna FC season =

Vienna
2010–11 season
- President: Herbert Dvoracek
- Coach: Frenkie Schinkels; Alfred Tatar
- Stadium: Hohe Warte Stadium, Vienna, Austria
- First League: 9th
- ÖFB-Cup: Quarter-finals
- Top goalscorer: League: Rade Đokić (16); All: Rade Đokić (18)
- Highest home attendance: 5,500
- Lowest home attendance: 1,000

The 2010–11 First Vienna FC season was the second consecutive season in the second highest professional division in Austria after the promotion in 2009. The coach Frenkie Schinkels was sacked on 29 August 2010 and former First Vienna player Alfred Tatar took over.

== Squad ==
=== Squad and statistics ===
No.	Pos	Nat	Player	Total		First League		Relegation playoffs		Austrian Cup	
No.	Pos	Nat	Player	Apps	Goals	Apps	Goals	Apps	Goals	Apps	Goals
Goalkeepers
1	GK	(Austria) AUT	Andreas Lukse	17	0	16	0	0	0	1	0
21	GK	(Austria) AUT	Marc Traby	9	0	7	0	2	0	0	0
25	GK	(Austria) AUT	Michael Pauli	0	0	0	0	0	0	0	0
30	GK	(Austria) AUT	Bartoloměj Kuru	16	0	13	0	0	0	3	0
Defenders
2	DF	(Slovenia) SVN	Erdžan Bečiri	18	2	15	1	2	1	1	0
3	DF	(Serbia) SRB	Marko Milutinović	8	0	7	0	0	0	1	0
4	DF	(Austria) AUT	Ernst Dospel	16	0	13	0	2	0	1	0
5	DF	(Austria) AUT	Patrick Osoinik	9	0	8	0	0	0	1	0
6	DF	(Austria) AUT	Marco Salvatore	37	0	31	0	2	0	4	0
13	DF	(Austria) AUT	Mahmud Imamoglu	13	0	12	0	0	0	1	0
14	DF	(Austria) AUT	Raphael Rathfuß	25	1	21	0	2	1	2	0
15	DF	(Austria) AUT	Predrag Ilic	4	0	4	0	0	0	0	0
17	DF	(Austria) AUT	Sargon Duran	10	0	9	0	0	0	1	0
19	DF	(Austria) AUT	Predrag Bjelovuk	7	0	6	0	0	0	1	0
22	DF	(Austria) AUT	Christian Balga	10	0	8	0	0	0	2	0
23	DF	(Austria) AUT	Mario Kröpfl	27	1	23	1	1	0	3	0
26	DF	(Brazil) BRA	Rodrigo Frank Pereira	18	2	17	2	0	0	1	0
28	DF	(Austria) AUT	Philipp Frenzl	19	0	16	0	0	0	3	0
29	DF	(Austria) AUT	Christian Sekulovic	0	0	0	0	0	0	0	0
31	DF	(Austria) AUT	Nikolaus Dvoracek	7	0	4	0	0	0	3	0
Midfielders
7	MF	(Austria) AUT	Richard Strohmayer	25	1	21	1	2	0	2	0
8	MF	(Austria) AUT	Marcel Toth	26	0	22	0	2	0	2	0
9	MF	(Austria) AUT	Sebastian Martinez	20	2	18	1	0	0	2	1
10	MF	(Austria) AUT	Andreas Fading	20	0	17	0	2	0	1	0
20	MF	(Serbia) SRB	Marjan Marković	18	2	15	2	2	0	1	0
21	MF	(Austria) AUT	Aleksandar Stanisavljević	11	1	9	1	1	0	1	0
24	MF	(Austria) AUT	Patrick Kienzl	26	2	23	2	2	0	1	0
27	MF	(Austria) AUT	Philipp Hiba	10	0	9	0	0	0	1	0
32	MF	(Austria) AUT	Christoph Mattes	9	1	8	1	0	0	1	0
34	MF	(Austria) AUT	Wolfgang Mair	16	3	13	2	2	1	1	0
Forwards
11	FW	(Bosnia and Herzegovina) BIH	Rade Đokić	37	18	32	16	2	1	3	1
16	FW	(Austria) AUT	Philipp Hosiner	38	16	33	13	2	1	3	2
18	FW	(Bosnia and Herzegovina) BIH	Eldar Topić	26	3	24	2	0	0	2	1
33	FW	(Austria) AUT	Daniel Weber	9	0	8	0	0	0	1	0
