= 2012–13 First Vienna FC season =

Vienna
2012–13 season
- President: Herbert Dvoracek
- Coach: Alfred Tatar
- Stadium: Hohe Warte Stadium, Vienna, Austria
- First League: 7th
- ÖFB-Cup: First Round
- Top goalscorer: League: Markus Pink (7); All: Markus Pink (9)
- Highest home attendance: 2,005
- Lowest home attendance: 788

The 2012–13 First Vienna FC season was the fourth consecutive season in the second highest professional division in Austria after the promotion in 2009.

== Squad ==
=== Squad and statistics ===
No.	Pos	Nat	Player	Total		First League		Austrian Cup	
No.	Pos	Nat	Player	Apps	Goals	Apps	Goals	Apps	Goals
Goalkeepers
1	GK	(Austria) AUT	Thomas Mandl	36	0	35	0	1	0
25	GK	(Austria) AUT	Uwe Kropfhofer	0	0	0	0	0	0
26	GK	(Austria) AUT	Dominik Braunsteiner	2	0	2	0	0	0
29	GK	(Austria) AUT	Michael Pauli	0	0	0	0	0	0
Defenders
2	DF	(Austria) AUT	Markus Speiser	29	0	28	0	1	0
4	DF	(Hungary) HUN	Richárd Czár	18	0	18	0	0	0
5	DF	(Belarus) BLR	Andrey Lebedzew	31	1	30	1	1	0
13	DF	(Austria) AUT	Ernst Dospel	8	0	7	0	1	0
15	DF	(Austria) AUT	Predrag Ilic	4	0	4	0	0	0
15	DF	(Bosnia and Herzegovina) BIH	Staniša Nikolić	15	0	15	0	0	0
18	DF	(Austria) AUT	Florian Bauer	15	0	14	0	1	0
20	DF	(Austria) AUT	Gunnar Fest	1	0	1	0	0	0
23	DF	(Austria) AUT	Mario Kröpfl	13	1	13	1	0	0
24	DF	(Austria) AUT	Philip Smola	1	0	1	0	0	0
32	DF	(Austria) AUT	Andreas Dober	33	4	32	4	1	0
44	DF	(Austria) AUT	Nikolaus Dvoracek	0	0	0	0	0	0
Midfielders
3	MF	(Austria) AUT	Ersan Gültekin	4	0	3	0	1	0
7	MF	(Austria) AUT	Jochen Fallmann	30	4	30	4	0	0
8	MF	(Austria) AUT	Jasmin Fejzic	6	0	5	0	1	0
10	MF	(Turkey) TUR	Mesut Doğan	10	1	9	1	1	0
10	MF	(Austria) AUT	Paul Bichelhuber	14	3	14	3	0	0
12	MF	(Austria) AUT	Bernhard Fucik	15	2	15	2	0	0
17	MF	(Austria) AUT	Mathias Perktold	9	0	8	0	1	0
19	MF	(Austria) AUT	Mirnes Becirovic	33	6	32	6	1	0
22	MF	(Austria) AUT	Robert Topcic	1	0	1	0	0	0
27	MF	(Austria) AUT	Richard Strohmayer	14	0	14	0	0	0
30	MF	(Chile) CHI	Joan Henríquez	1	0	1	0	0	0
31	MF	(Austria) AUT	Anton Berisha	14	2	14	2	0	0
Forwards
6	FW	(Ukraine) UKR	Myroslav Slavov	20	6	20	6	0	0
9	FW	(Austria) AUT	Markus Pink	22	9	21	7	1	2
11	FW	(Austria) AUT	Hakan Gökçek	30	1	29	1	1	0
16	FW	(Austria) AUT	Lukas Hinterseer	19	2	18	2	1	0
17	FW	(Austria) AUT	Marco Miesenböck	15	4	15	4	0	0
28	FW	(Austria) AUT	Dominik Rotter	32	3	32	3	0	0
