= 2011–12 First Vienna FC season =

Vienna
2011–12 season
- President: Herbert Dvoracek
- Coach: Alfred Tatar
- Stadium: Hohe Warte Stadium, Vienna, Austria
- First League: 8th
- ÖFB-Cup: First Round
- Top goalscorer: League: Wolfgang Mair (9); All: Wolfgang Mair (9)
- Highest home attendance: 3,677
- Lowest home attendance: 1,523

The 2011–12 First Vienna FC season was the third consecutive season in the second highest professional division in Austria after the promotion in 2009.

== Squad ==
=== Squad and statistics ===
| No. | Pos | Nat | Player | Total | | First League | | Austrian Cup | |
| No. | Pos | Nat | Player | Apps | Goals | Apps | Goals | Apps | Goals |
Goalkeepers
| 1 | GK | (Austria) AUT | Thomas Dau | 15 | 0 | 15 | 0 | 0 | 0 |
| 21 | GK | (Austria) AUT | Marc Traby | 17 | 0 | 17 | 0 | 0 | 0 |
| 25 | GK | (Austria) AUT | Michael Pauli | 0 | 0 | 0 | 0 | 0 | 0 |
| 30 | GK | (Austria) AUT | Bartoloměj Kuru | 5 | 0 | 4 | 0 | 1 | 0 |
Defenders
| 2 | DF | (Slovenia) SVN | Erdžan Bečiri | 21 | 1 | 20 | 1 | 1 | 0 |
| 4 | DF | (Austria) AUT | Philip Smola | 1 | 0 | 0 | 0 | 1 | 0 |
| 6 | DF | (Austria) AUT | Marco Salvatore | 33 | 0 | 32 | 0 | 1 | 0 |
| 13 | DF | (Austria) AUT | Ernst Dospel | 34 | 0 | 33 | 0 | 1 | 0 |
| 14 | DF | (Austria) AUT | Raphael Rathfuß | 29 | 0 | 29 | 0 | 0 | 0 |
| 18 | DF | (Serbia) SRB | Ermin Tutić | 0 | 0 | 0 | 0 | 0 | 0 |
| 22 | DF | (Austria) AUT | Florian Sturm | 10 | 0 | 10 | 0 | 0 | 0 |
| 23 | DF | (Austria) AUT | Mario Kröpfl | 28 | 1 | 27 | 1 | 1 | 0 |
| 31 | DF | (Austria) AUT | Nikolaus Dvoracek | 7 | 0 | 6 | 0 | 1 | 0 |
Midfielders
| 2 | MF | (Spain) ESP | Nacho Verdés | 11 | 0 | 11 | 0 | 0 | 0 |
| 5 | MF | (Austria) AUT | Matthias Hattenberger | 29 | 3 | 29 | 3 | 0 | 0 |
| 7 | MF | (Austria) AUT | Richard Strohmayer | 3 | 0 | 3 | 0 | 0 | 0 |
| 8 | MF | (Austria) AUT | Marcel Toth | 26 | 2 | 25 | 2 | 1 | 0 |
| 10 | MF | (Austria) AUT | Christoph Mattes | 19 | 3 | 18 | 3 | 1 | 0 |
| 15 | MF | (Austria) AUT | David Jelenko | 12 | 0 | 12 | 0 | 0 | 0 |
| 16 | MF | (Austria) AUT | Markus Lackner | 26 | 3 | 25 | 3 | 1 | 0 |
| 17 | MF | (Austria) AUT | Konstantin Kerschbaumer | 33 | 5 | 32 | 5 | 1 | 0 |
| 20 | MF | (Serbia) SRB | Marjan Marković | 23 | 7 | 23 | 7 | 0 | 0 |
| 24 | MF | (Austria) AUT | Patrick Kienzl | 12 | 0 | 11 | 0 | 1 | 0 |
| 24 | MF | (Austria) AUT | Julian Erhart | 14 | 1 | 14 | 1 | 0 | 0 |
| 34 | MF | (Austria) AUT | Wolfgang Mair | 35 | 9 | 35 | 9 | 0 | 0 |
Forwards
| 9 | FW | (Austria) AUT | Andreas Tiffner | 16 | 2 | 15 | 2 | 1 | 0 |
| 11 | FW | (Bosnia and Herzegovina) BIH | Rade Đokić | 22 | 5 | 22 | 5 | 0 | 0 |
| 12 | FW | (Austria) AUT | Hakan Gökcek | 7 | 0 | 6 | 0 | 1 | 0 |
| 28 | FW | (Austria) AUT | Dominik Rotter | 17 | 2 | 17 | 2 | 0 | 0 |
