= Daniel Weber =

Daniel Weber may refer to:

- Daniel Weber (footballer) (born 1990), Austrian footballer
- Daniel E. Weber (born 1940), American food technologist

== See also ==
- Daniel Webber (disambiguation)
