= 2019 Slovak Cup final =

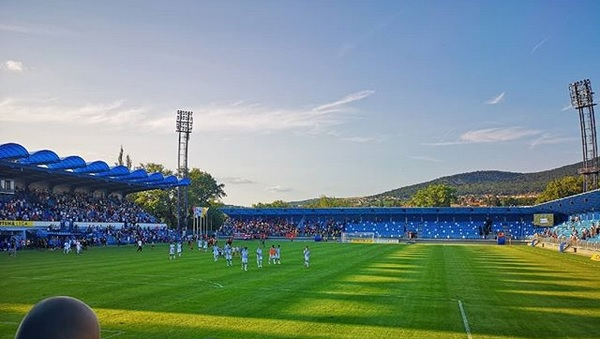
- Štadión pod Zoborom in Nitra held the final
- Event: 2018–19 Slovak Cup
Spartak Trnava	Žilina
3	3
- After extra time Spartak Trnava won 4–1 on penalties
- Date: 1 May 2019
- Venue: Štadión pod Zoborom, Nitra
- Referee: Jozef Pavlík
- Attendance: 6,053

The 2019 Slovak Cup final (Slovak: Slovenský Pohár), known as the Slovnaft Cup for sponsorship reasons, was the final match of the 2018–19 Slovak Cup, the 50th season of the top cup competition in Slovak football. The match was played at the Štadión pod Zoborom in Nitra on 1 May 2019 between Spartak Trnava and Žilina.

Spartak Trnava took a 3–0 lead shortly after half time thanks to a goal from Fabian Miesenböck and a brace from Kire Markoski. However, the match went to extra time after a Filip Balaj brace and a Róbert Boženík goal for Žilina. There were no further goals in extra time and Spartak Trnava won the trophy 4–1 on penalties.

== Background ==
Following the Velvet Divorce in 1992, Spartak Trnava had once previously won the Slovak Cup – in 1998 when they defeated Košice 2–0 – and had reached the final on five previous occasions.

Similarly, Žilina had once previously won the Slovak Cup in the post-Czechoslovakia era – in 2012 when they defeated Senica 3–2 – and had reached the final on three previous occasions.

== Road to the final ==
=== Spartak Trnava ===
Spartak Trnava began the competition by defeating Rača 9–0 in the second round. In the third round, they defeated Slovan Most 3–1. Spartak Trnava then defeated Partizán Bardejov 5–0. In the last 16, they defeated Železiarne Podbrezová 2–0. After a goalless draw, they then defeated Košice 4–3 on penalties. In the semi-finals, Spartak Trnava defeated Senica 1–0 on aggregate.

=== Žilina ===
Žilina began the competition by defeating Ďarmoty 7–0 in the second round. In the third round, they defeated Tatran Krásno 6–0. Žilina then defeated Tatran Prešov 2–1. In the last 16, they defeated Sereď 3–1. They then defeated Skalica 4–1. In the semi-finals, Spartak Trnava defeated Zemplín Michalovce 3–1 on aggregate.

Note: In all results below, the score of the finalist is given first (H: home; A: away).

Spartak Trnava		Round	Žilina
Opponent	Result	2018–19 Slovak Cup	Opponent	Result
FK Rača	9–0 (A)	Second Round	FK Slovenské Ďarmoty	7−0 (A)
Most pri Bratislave	3−1 (A)	Third Round	Krásno nad Kysucou	6–0 (A)
Bardejov	5−0 (A)	Fourth Round	Tatran Prešov	2–1 (A)
Podbrezová	2−0 (A)	Round of 16	Sereď	3–1 (H)
FC Košice	0–0 (4–3 p) (A)	Quarter-finals	Skalica	4–1 (H)
FK Senica	1–0 (H), 0–0 (A) (1–0 agg.)	Semi-finals	Zemplín Michalovce	1–1 (H), 2–0 (A) (3–1 agg.)

== Match ==
=== Details ===
1 May 2019
18:00 (UTC+2)

Spartak Trnava	3–3 (a.e.t.)	Žilina
Miesenböck 20'; Markoski 45+4', 48'	Report	Balaj 50', 71'; Boženík 68'
Penalties
Košút (penalty scored); Depetris (penalty scored); Lovat (penalty scored); Abena (penalty scored)	4–1	(penalty scored) Holúbek; (penalty missed) Káčer; (penalty missed) Boženík

Štadión pod Zoborom, Nitra
Attendance: 6,053
Referee: Jozef Pavlík

FC Spartak Trnava	MŠK Žilina

GK	26	(Czech Republic) Petr Bolek		(substituted off) 119'
RB	2	(Slovakia) Matúš Turňa
CB	14	(Suriname) Myenty Abena
CB	44	(Slovakia) Tomáš Košút	(yellow card) 16'
LB	36	(Brazil) Lucas Lovat	(yellow card) 31'
CM	66	(Slovakia) Marek Janečka		(substituted off) 106'
CM	18	(Slovakia) Anton Sloboda (c)
CM	17	(Austria) Fabian Miesenböck	(yellow card) 26'	(substituted off) 72'
RW	24	(North Macedonia) Kire Markoski		(substituted off) 75'
FW	11	(Austria) Kubilay Yilmaz
LW	20	(Slovakia) Matúš Čonka	(yellow card) 100'
Substitutes:
GK	31	(Slovakia) Dobrivoj Rusov		(substituted in) 119'
RB	16	(United States) Macario Hing-Glover		(substituted in) 75'
DF	10	(Nigeria) Musefiu Ashiru
CM	25	(Czech Republic) Jakub Rada
CF	39	(Slovakia) Štefan Pekár	(substituted in) 72'	(yellow card) 114'
FW	27	(Slovakia) Andrej Lovás
FW	22	(Slovakia) David Depetris		(substituted in) 106'
Manager:
(Czech Republic) Michal Ščasný

GK	1	(Slovakia) Miloš Volešák
RB	28	(Ghana) Benson Anang	(yellow card) 90'	(substituted off) 106'
CB	3	(Slovakia) Martin Králik
CB	25	(Czech Republic) Filip Kaša
LB	6	(Slovakia) Branislav Sluka
CM	66	(Slovakia) Miroslav Káčer	(yellow card) 37'
CM	20	(Slovakia) Michal Škvarka (c)
CM	9	(Argentina) Iván Díaz		(substituted off) 46'
RW	27	(Slovakia) Jaroslav Mihalík		(substituted off) 99'
CF	10	(Slovakia) Filip Balaj		(substituted off) 111'
LW	32	(Slovakia) Róbert Boženík
Substitutes:
GK	30	(Slovakia) Dominik Holec
CB	2	(Georgia (country)) Luka Lochoshvili
CB	23	(Slovakia) Ján Minárik		(substituted in) 106'
MF	14	(Slovakia) Jakub Holúbek		(substituted in) 46'
DM	12	(Slovakia) Viktor Pečovský		(substituted in) 111'
RM	21	(Slovakia) Ján Bernát		(substituted in) 99'
RW	8	(Slovakia) Lukáš Jánošík
Manager:
(Slovakia) Jaroslav Kentoš

Assistant referees:
Tomáš Somoláni
Ján Pozor
Fourth official:
Michal Tomčík

Match rules

- 90 minutes.
- 30 minutes of extra time if necessary.
- Penalty shoot-out if scores still level.

== See also ==
- 2018–19 Slovak Cup
- 2019–20 UEFA Europa League
