= David Rosenberg (poet) =

American poet and biblical translator

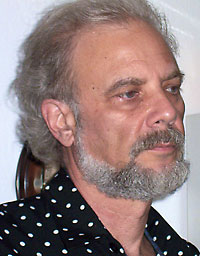
- David Rosenberg
- Born: August 1, 1943 (age 83); Detroit, Michigan, U.S.
- Education: University of Michigan
- Occupations: Poet, Biblical translator, Editor, Educator
- Spouse: Rhonda Rosenberg (writer)
- Writing career
- Notable works: A Poet's Bible, The Book of J, Abraham: The First Historical Biography
- Notable awards: PEN Translation Prize

David Rosenberg (born August 1, 1943) is an American poet, biblical translator, editor, and educator. He is best known for The Book of J (with Harold Bloom) and A Poet's Bible, which earned PEN Translation Prize in 1992. The Book of J stayed on The New York Times bestseller list for many weeks.

== Biography ==
David Rosenberg was born on August 1, 1943, in Detroit, Michigan to Herman and Shifra Rosenberg. His father worked in the popcorn business and his mother worked as a seamstress. Rosenberg is married to Rhonda Rosenberg, a public health scientist. They currently live in Miami, Florida.

=== Education ===
Rosenberg graduated with a B.A. in creative writing from the University of Michigan in 1964. He got his M.F.A. from Syracuse University, M.F.A. in 1966. He did additional graduate work at the University of Essex in England from 1970 to 1972 and at Hebrew University of Jerusalem from 1980–82.

=== Professional ===
After getting his B.A he was the personal assistant of Robert Lowell at The New School in New York City from 1961 to 1962. In 1993 he returned to The New School as an online instructor in writing. In 1967–71, Rosenberg was a lecturer in English and creative writing at York University in Toronto, Canada. In 1972 he was the Poet in Residence at Central Connecticut State University. From 1973 to 1975 he was the Master Poet for New York State Arts Council. From 1974–76 he was an assistant professor of creative writing at CUNY La Guardia. From 1978- 1982 he lived in Israel where he worked as an editor for Hakibbutz Hameuchad/The Institute for Translation of Hebrew Literature from 1981–83. When he returned to the United States, he was a senior editor at the Jewish Publication Society from 1981–83. After leaving the JPS, he worked as a senior editor at Harcourt Brace Jovanovich until 1987. In 1992 he became the writer-in-residence at Fairchild Tropical Garden in Miami, Florida. He was named the Field Bridge fellow from 1994–97 at National Tropical Botanical Garden, also in Miami. From 2011–12 he was a visiting professor of creative writing at Princeton University.

He has served as editor for The Ant's Forefoot from 1967 to 1973, and Forthcoming from 1981–84.

=== Awards ===
- Hopwood Special Award for Poetry, 1964
- Syracuse University graduate fellowship in poetry, 1965-66
- PEN/Book-of-the-Month-Club Translation Prize, 1992, for A Poet's Bible
- Guggenheim Fellowship, 2013 for creative nonfiction

== Publications ==
In 1990, The Book of J, which Rosenberg co-wrote with Harold Bloom was published. Rosenberg translated the biblical texts for the book. What was notable about the book was that Rosenberg and Bloom identify the earliest narrator of the bible as a woman.

In 2006, his translations of biblical passages helped him write Abraham: The First Historical Biography. Publishers Weekly reported the book was sold to Viking in 2001. This book puts biblical Abraham into the cultural context of ancient Sumer.

In his 1976 introduction to Job Speaks, Donald Hall said that Rosenberg "has been for some years a poet to watch, even to contend with..." "...became an ancient Hebrew religious poet writing in the rhythms of the United States."

=== Works ===
- Excellent Articles of Japan (1969), Coach House (Toronto, Ontario, Canada)
- Disappearing Horses (1969), Coach House (Toronto, Ontario, Canada)
- Headlights (1970), Weed/ Flower Press (Toronto, Ontario, Canada)
- Night School (1970), Voiceprint (Essex, England)
- Paris and London (1971), Talonbooks (Vancouver, British Columbia, Canada)
- A Star in My Hair (1971), Weed/ Flower Press (Toronto, Ontario, Canada)
- Leavin' America (1972), Coach House (Toronto, Ontario, Canada)
- Frontal Nudity (1972), Telephone (New York, NY)
- The Necessity of Poetry (1973), Coach House (Toronto, Ontario, Canada)
- Some Psalms (1973), Angel Hair (New York, NY)
- Blues of the Sky: Interpreted from the Original Hebrew Book of Psalms (1976), Harper (New York, NY)
- Job Speaks: Interpreted from the Original Hebrew Book of Job (1977), Harper (New York, NY)
- A Blazing Fountain: A Book for Hanukkah (1978), Schocken (New York, NY)
- Lightworks: Interpreted from the Original Hebrew Book of Isaiah (1978), Harper (New York, NY)
- Chosen Days: Celebrating Jewish Festivals in Poetry and Art (1980), Doubleday (New York, NY)
- The Book of J (1990), interpreted by Harold Bloom, Grove (New York, NY), Translator and co-author
- A Poet's Bible: Rediscovering the Voices of the Original Text (1991), Hyperion (New York, NY)
- The Lost Book of Paradise: Adam and Eve in the Garden of Eden (1993), Hyperion (New York, NY)
- The Book of David (1997), Harmony Books (New York, NY)
- Dreams of Being Eaten Alive: The Literary Core of the Kabbalah (2000), Harmony Books (New York, NY)
- See What You Think: Critical Essays for the Next Avant Garde (2003), Spuyten Duyvil (New York, NY)
- Abraham: The First Historical Biography (2006), Basic Books (New York, NY)
- A Literary Bible: An Original Translation (2009), Counterpoint (Berkeley, CA)
- An Educated Man: A Dual Biography of Moses and Jesus (2010), Counterpoint (Berkeley, CA)

=== Editor ===
- Congregation: Contemporary Writers Read the Jewish Bible, (1987) Harcourt (San Diego, CA)
- Testimony: Contemporary Writers Make the Holocaust Personal (1989), Times Books (New York, NY), also contributor
- The Movie That Changed My Life (1991), Viking (New York, NY), also contributor
- Genesis as It Is Written: Contemporary Writers on Our First Stories (1996), Harper San Francisco (San Francisco, CA), also author of introduction
- Communion: Contemporary Writers Reveal the Bible in Their Lives (1996), Anchor Books (New York, NY), also author of introduction

== Reception ==
Rosenberg's translations have often been identified as controversial, but are rooted in his own Jewish cultural heritage. He has focused on themes and topics such as authorhood and eroticism. He told Contemporary Authors Online: "a lifelong focus on the intersection of autobiographical writing and lost writers. Beyond psychoanalysis, I've searched for the origin of the primary lost writer in myself by returning to those at the origin of Western history."

=== A Literary Bible ===
In his New York Times book review, Frank Kermode discussed how Rosenberg worked to be both modern in his translation, and faithful to the original Hebrew. Further, he notes in his review that Harold Bloom, who co-wrote The Book of J with Rosenberg, identified J as Bathsheba. Rosenberg doesn't agree with this. Adam Kirsch said in The New Republic that Rosenberg is "replacing the doubtful miracle of divine inspiration with the genuine miracle of poetic inspiration".

=== The Book of J ===
In this work, which was a product of a collaboration with Harold Bloom, the authors focused on the first five books of the Old Testament, the Pentateuch, and more specifically a source identified as the Yahwist. In the book, Rosenberg and Bloom identify J as a woman. Rosenberg provided the translation of this source for the book. Frank Kermode, in his review of The Book of J for The New York Times, says that Rosenberg's translation "...[avoided] the blandness of the modern versions" of the Bible. He adds: "This bold and deeply meditated translation attempts to reproduce the puns, off-rhymes and wordplay of the original." According to The New Yorker's Edward Hirsch, "Rosenberg's innovative translation struggles to re-create J's distinctive voice, a tone of modulated ironic grandeur ... words echoing within words." Barbara Probst Solomon, a contributor for the Washington Post Book World, commented that Rosenberg "has given a fresh, interpretive translation of the salient portions of the 'J' sections of the Pentateuch."

In regard to Rosenberg's translation, co-author Harold Bloom said: "The main virtue I find in David Rosenberg's translation of what we have ventured to call the Book of J is that he has preserved the Yahwist's ironic tone and stance, while remembering throughout how individual her irony is." Additionally, Bloom adds "The play on J's language emerges in Rosenberg's version as it does not in Tyndale, King James, or Speiser.... As always, what we are likeliest to miss in J when we read her previous translators is given back to us by Rosenberg."

=== The Lost Book of Paradise ===
Doing both translation and commentary, this work is based on the eleventh century B.C.E. "Scroll of Paradise," or Sefer Gan Eden. The work includes commentary from Devorah Bat-David, a semi-fictional scholar in the Solomonic Library of ancient Jerusalem. While in Jerusalem, Rosenberg came across a seal impression of her signature. Robert Taylor, from The Boston Globe said that "Rosenberg blends Devorah Bat-David's commentary on the Book of Paradise with his own remarks, framing a lucid prose poetry that conveys the sense of the story as both extremely old and intensely immediate." Taylor added: "Then too, it often seems that he is surveying a mythic past through the green-tinted glasses of the ecologically aware present."

=== Dreams of Being Eaten Alive ===
Jonathan Wilson wrote in The New York Times Book Review that "Rosenberg has done a remarkable job in bringing to English some of the most unnerving and powerful passages in the early cabala." A contributor for Publishers Weekly said: "Rosenberg's ruminations range so widely that they are sometimes difficult to follow; alongside allusions to Kafka and Dante, he refers to the television series Touched by an Angel and devotes nearly an entire chapter to the spirituality exhibited on Oprah."

=== The Book of David ===
Using the books of Samuel as his main source, Rosenberg shows King David as king, warrior, poet, and scholar. The narrator is "S", who was possibly a young man in a sexual relationship with J, from The Book of J. Jeff Ahrens of Booklist said: "He translates the results, which actually lack the events of David's life before he became king, and they entertain as much as the presentation of them fascinates." The contributors from Publishers Weekly said "Rosenberg's book is best when it tells David's story in a way that reveals the characters of David, Rosenberg, and 'S'."

=== Abraham: The First Historical Biography ===
Rosenberg looked at the life of Abraham in the context of being a Sumerian and the originator of monotheistic religions. Rosenberg identifies Biblical Abraham as being written from 4 different narrators: J (from the Book of J), X, E, and P. Bryce Christensen, in a Booklist review of the title, said: "Rosenberg's explanations of how the God of Scripture and first Hebrew appeared together on the stage of history draw on both immense research and shrewd speculation." In the New York Sun, Carl Rollyson says: "Abraham is not, in Mr. Rosenberg's view, a legendary figure but a person who actually lived. He is not merely a "fiction" created by writers establishing a religion but a flesh-and-blood man who left records of himself and his culture, lost for millennia but now gradually being excavated from what once was Sumer and its surroundings." In this book, Rosenberg seeks to understand not just the subject, but the narrators as well.
