= Kröpfl =

Kröpfl is a German-language, Austrian surname. Notable people with this surname include:

- Francisco Kröpfl (1931–2021), Argentinian composer
- Mario Kröpfl (born 1989), Austrian footballer
- Mario Kröpfl (born 1991), Austrian footballer
- Christoph Kröpfl (born 1990), Austrian footballer
