= Antonitsch =

Antonitsch is an Austrian surname. Notable people with the surname include:

- Alex Antonitsch (born 1966), Austrian tennis player
- Mira Antonitsch (born 1998), Austrian tennis player, daughter of Alex
- Nico Antonitsch (born 1991), Austrian footballer
