= Fabian Miesenböck =

Austrian footballer (born 1993)

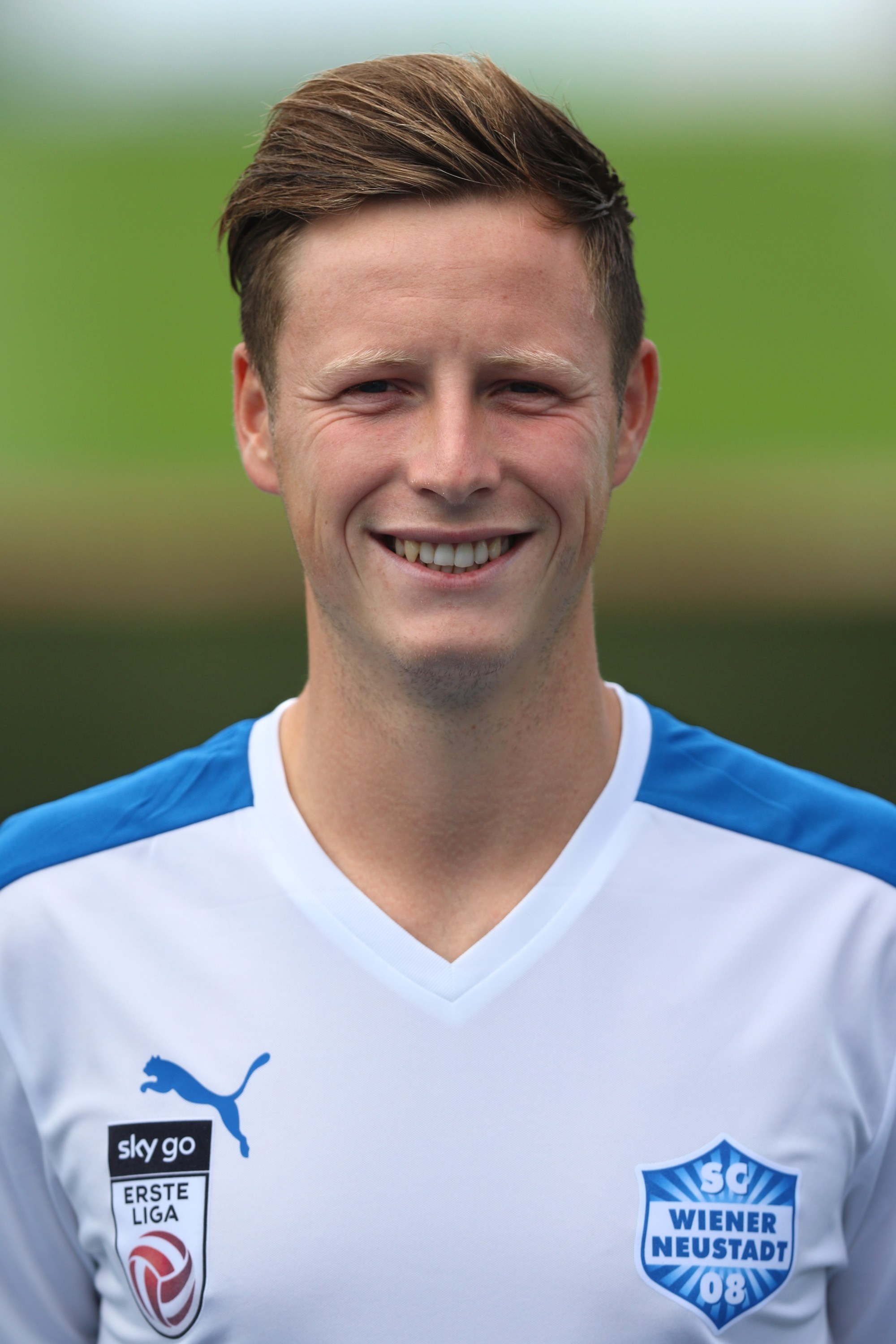

Personal information
- Date of birth: 7 July 1993 (age 33)
- Place of birth: Klagenfurt, Austria
- Height: 1.73 m (5 ft 8 in)
- Positions: Winger; attacking midfielder

Youth career
- 1999–2007: Kärnten
- 2007–2010: Austria Kärnten
- 2010–2011: Austria Wien

Senior career*
Years	Team	Apps	(Gls)
2011–2013	SC/ESV Parndorf	28	(2)
2013–2016	Austria Klagenfurt	90	(13)
2016–2017	LASK	16	(3)
2017–2018	Wiener Neustadt	32	(7)
2018–2019	Spartak Trnava	21	(4)
2019–2021	Mattersburg	16	(1)
2021–2023	Austria Klagenfurt	26	(2)
2023	SKU Amstetten	5	(0)
- * Club domestic league appearances and goals as of 26 November 2023

Fabian Miesenböck (born 7 July 1993) is an Austrian professional footballer who plays as a winger or attacking midfielder.

== Club career ==
In October 2023, Miesenböck signed for 2. Liga club SKU Amstetten.

== Personal life ==
Miesenböck is the brother of footballer Marco Miesenböck.

== Honours ==
Spartak Trnava

- Slovnaft Cup: 2018–19
