= Speiser =

Speiser is a German and Yiddish surname. Notable people with the surname include:

- Ambros Speiser (1922–2003), Swiss engineer and scientist
- Andreas Speiser (1885–1970), Swiss mathematician
- Elisabeth Speiser (born 1940), Swiss operatic soprano
- Eliyahu Speiser (1930–2009), Israeli politician
- Ephraim Avigdor Speiser (1902–1965), American Assyriologist
- Felix Speiser (1880–1949), Swiss ethnologist
- Jerry Speiser (born 1953), Australian drummer
- Markus Speiser (born 1985), Austrian footballer
- Paul Gustav Eduard Speiser (1877–1945), German entomologist
- Paul Speiser (1846–1935), Swiss politician
- Elizabeth Speiser (1984–), American Architectural Photographer

== See also ==
- Speiser Shale, a geologic formation in Kansas, United States
- Speiser v. Randall, a United States Supreme Court case
