= Nico Antonitsch =

Austrian footballer (born 1991)

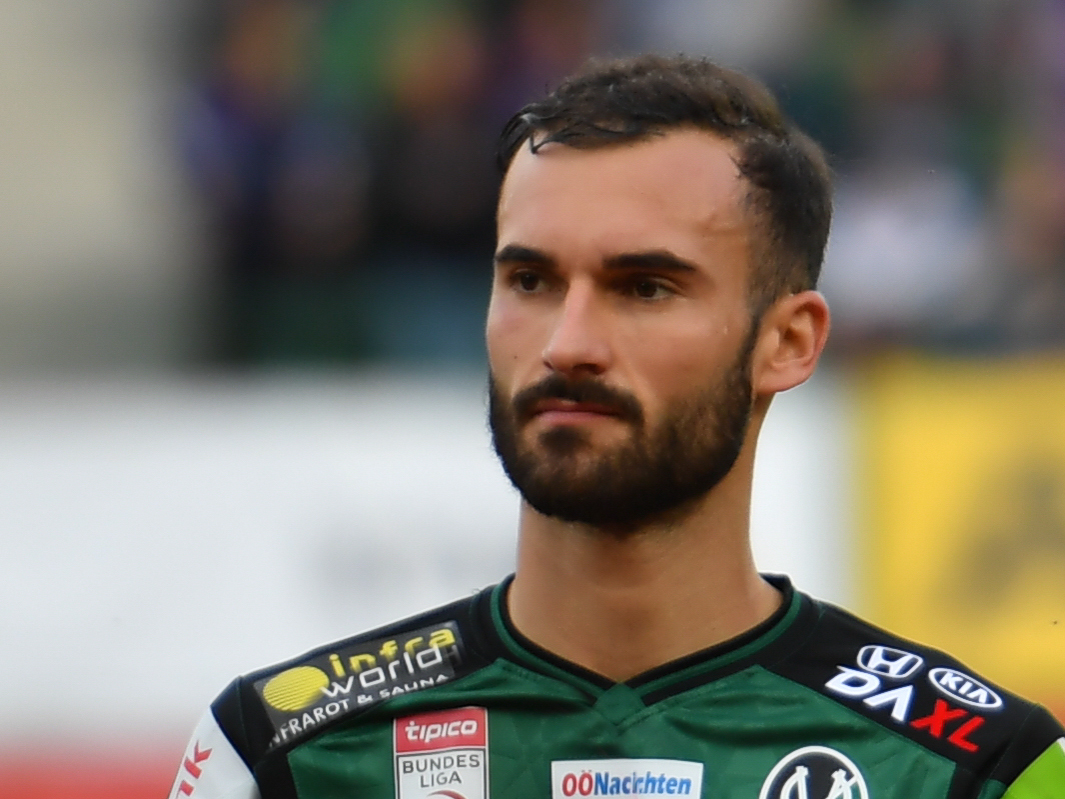
- Antonitsch playing for SV Ried in 2017

Personal information
- Date of birth: 30 September 1991 (age 35)
- Place of birth: Vienna, Austria
- Height: 1.85 m (6 ft 1 in)
- Position: Centre-back

Team information
- Current team: Hapoel Petah Tikva
- Number: 27

Youth career
- 1999–2000: ASV Hohenau
- 2000–: SV Garsten
- –2010: AKA Linz

Senior career*
Years	Team	Apps	(Gls)
2010–2012	Union St. Florian	57	(5)
2012–2013	Kapfenberger SV	6	(0)
2013–2015	SV Horn	65	(6)
2015–2017	SV Ried	19	(1)
2017	LASK Juniors OÖ	7	(0)
2017–2019	FSV Zwickau	62	(6)
2019–2023	FC Ingolstadt	69	(2)
2023–2024	SV Elversberg	20	(1)
2024–	Hapoel Petah Tikva	10	(0)
- * Club domestic league appearances and goals as of 15 April 2024

Nico Antonitsch (born 30 September 1991) is an Austrian professional footballer who plays as a centre-back for Israeli club Hapoel Petah Tikva.

== Club career ==
=== Union St. Florian ===
Antonitsch's first senior club was Union St. Florian in the Austrian Regionalliga. He made his league debut for the club on 6 August 2010 in a 1–1 away draw with Austria Klagenfurt. He scored his first competitive goal for the club on 2 October 2010 in a 3–2 away victory over SC Weiz. His goal, scored in the 67th minute, made the score 3–2 to Union St. Florian.

=== Kapfenberger ===
In July 2012, Antonitsch moved to Kapfenberger SV on a free transfer. He made his competitive debut for the senior team on 14 July 2012 in a 2–1 away victory over SC Bregenz. He was subbed on for Sanel Kuljić in the 80th minute. His league debut came just 13 days later, in a 3–3 draw with SV Horn.

=== SV Horn ===
In July 2013, Antonitsch moved to Austrian Football Second League club SV Horn. He made his competitive debut for the club on 13 July 2013 in a 3–1 away victory over FC Hard in the Austrian Cup. He was subbed on for Marcel Toth in the 67th minute. He made his league debut for the club just six days later, in a 3–2 away defeat to SCR Altach. He was subbed on for Bernd Gschweidl at halftime. His first competitive goal for the club came on 25 March 2014 in a 3–1 home defeat to Parndorf. He scored in the 85th minute.

=== SV Ried ===
In June 2015, Antonitsch moved to SV Ried in the Austrian Bundesliga on a one-year contract with an option for another year's extension. He made his competitive debut for the club on 29 August 2015 in a 4–1 away defeat to Grödig. He was subbed on for Bernhard Janeczek in the 35th minute. His first competitive goal for the club came on 6 February 2016 in a 3–3 away draw with Mattersburg. His goal, scored in the 59th minute, made the score 3–1 to Ried. In a league match against Austria Wien on 5 March 2016, Antonitsch was subbed off injured in the 63rd minute, to be replaced by Denis Streker. He ended up suffering a ligament tear in his left knee, leaving him sidelined for six weeks.

=== FC Juniors OÖ ===
In July 2017, Antonitsch signed for Austrian Regionalliga club FC Juniors OÖ. He made his competitive debut for the club on 22 July 2017 in a 4–3 away victory over TuS Bad Gleichenberg.

=== FSV Zwickau ===
In August 2017, Antonitsch signed for 3. Liga club FSV Zwickau. He made his competitive debut for the club on 8 September 2017 in a 2–0 away victory over Preußen Münster. He scored his first competitive goal for the club just a week later, in a 3–1 home victory over Magdeburg. His goal, scored in the 63rd minute, made the score 3–1 to Zwickau. In June 2018, Antonitsch renewed his contract with Zwickau, opting to stay another year. He had been offered contracts with clubs in Cyprus and Austria, but he decided to stay in Germany.

=== FC Ingolstadt 04 ===
In August 2019, FC Ingolstadt announced the signing of Antonitsch on a deal until 2021.

=== SV Elversberg ===
On 5 January 2023, Antonitsch signed a 1.5-year contract with SV Elversberg.
