= A Poet's Bible =

1991 partial translation of the Old Testament into English

A Poet's Bible: Rediscovering The Voices of the Original Text
- Author: David Rosenberg
- Language: English
- Genre: Poetry
- Publisher: Hyperion
- Publication date: 1991
- Publication place: United States
- Media type: Paperback)
- Pages: 410 pp
- ISBN: 1-56282-922-X (paperback)
- OCLC: 26633515
- Dewey Decimal: 811/.54 20
- LC Class: PS3568.O783 P6 1993
- Preceded by: The Book of J
- Followed by: The Lost Book of Paradise: Adam and Eve in the Garden of Eden

A Poet's Bible: Rediscovering The Voices of the Original Text is a 1991 partial translation into English of the Old Testament, including some books of the Hebrew Bible along with related apocrypha, by David Rosenberg. The book was received well by scholars and critics, receiving the PEN Translation Prize in 1992. However, it did not do well commercially and is currently out of print.

Rosenberg's philosophy in approaching the Hebrew text was to render into English not a literal translation of the Old Testament material for religious purposes, but to capture the essence of the art as viewed by the contemporaries of the authors. Rosenberg argues that most Biblical material has become overly familiar to us, and we are at a loss, for whatever personal reason we may have, to appreciate it as poetry, in and of itself (hence the "rediscovery" of the book's subtitle). To accomplish this, Rosenberg uses a modern poetic form, the triadic stanza favoured by William Carlos Williams, for the majority of the book, and also uses a great deal of modern slang and imagery. Rosenberg describes the latter as Doogri, which is a Modern Hebrew word for street idiom.

== Books Translated ==
- Psalms
- Song of Solomon
- Lamentations
- Maccabees
- Job
- Ecclesiastes
- Isaiah
- Jeremiah
- Zechariah
- Jonah
- Ruth
- Esther
- Judith
- Daniel
- Ezra/Nehemiah

== Comparison to KJV ==
The King James Version, prepared in 1611, is the best-known and most widely used translation of Christian Bible, and that with which readers are most familiar. To provide a feel for Rosenberg's translation, Psalm 23 is given below in the versions from the KJV and from A Poet's Bible.

From the KJV:

The Lord is my shepherd; I shall not want. He maketh me to lie down in green pastures: he leadeth me beside the still waters. He restoreth my soul: he leadeth me in the paths of righteousness for his name's sake. Yea, though I walk through the valley of the shadow of death, I will fear no evil: for thou art with me; thy rod and thy staff they comfort me. Thou preparest a table before me in the presence of mine enemies: thou anointest my head with oil; my cup runneth over. Surely goodness and mercy shall follow me all the days of my life: and I will dwell in the house of the Lord for ever.

From A Poet's Bible:

The Lord is my shepherd
and keeps me from wanting
what I can't have

lush green grass is set
around me and crystal water
to graze by

there I revive with my soul
find the way that love makes
for his name and though I pass

through cities of pain, through death's living shadow
I'm not afraid to touch
to know what I am

your shepherd's staff is always there
to keep me calm
in my body

you set a table before me
in the presence of my enemies
you give me grace to speak

to quiet them
to be full with humanness
to be warm in my soul's lightness

to feel contact every day
in my hand and in my belly
love coming down to me

in the air of your name, Lord
in your house
in my life.
