= Dominik Braunsteiner =

Austrian footballer

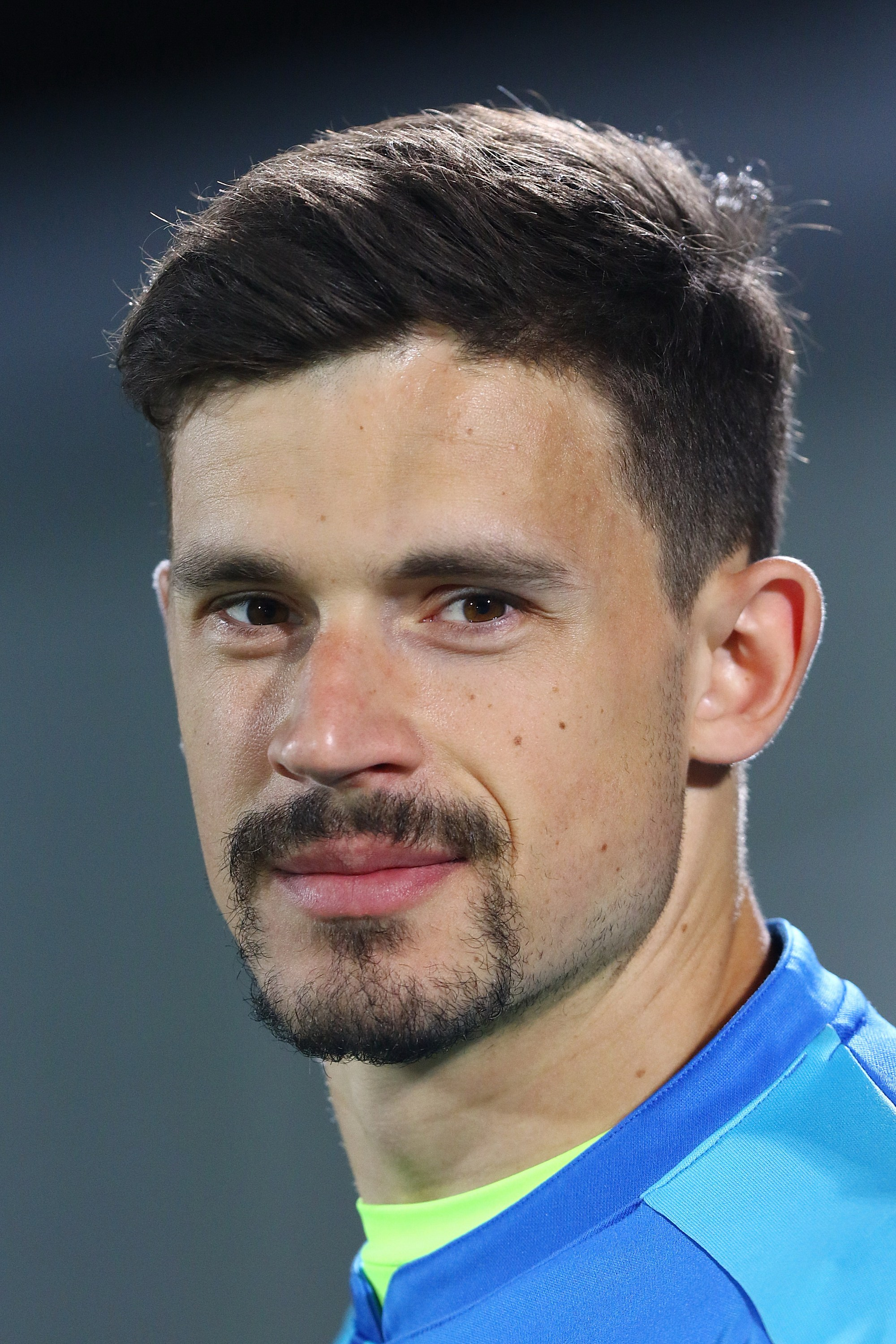
- Braunsteiner in 2018

Personal information
- Date of birth: 15 July 1992 (age 34)
- Place of birth: Vienna, Austria
- Height: 1.83 m (6 ft 0 in)
- Position: Goalkeeper

Youth career
- 2000–2009: First Vienna

Senior career*
Years	Team	Apps	(Gls)
2009–2010	Fortuna 05	2	(0)
2010–2011	1980 Wien	23	(0)
2011–2015	First Vienna	2	(0)
2014–2015	→ Kufstein (loan)	34	(0)
2016–2017	Wiener Viktoria	18	(0)
2017–2018	Wiener Neustadt	0	(0)
2019	Marianum	1	(0)
- * Club domestic league appearances and goals as of 21:56, 27 August 2021 (UTC)

Dominik Braunsteiner (born 15 July 1992) is an Austrian football player.

== Club career ==
He made his Austrian Football First League debut for First Vienna FC on 22 May 2013 in a game against SV Horn.

Ahead of the 2019–20 season, Braunsteiner joined RSV Marianum Post 17.
