= Daniel Webber =

Daniel Webber may refer to:

- Danny Webber (born 1981), English footballer
- Daniel Webber (actor) (born 1988), Australian actor
