= Mathias Perktold =

Austrian footballer

Personal information
- Date of birth: 17 April 1987 (age 39)
- Position: Midfielder

Senior career*
| Years | Team | Apps | (Gls) |
| 2007–2008 | FC Kufstein | 36 | (4) |
| 2008–2009 | SC Schwaz | 26 | (7) |
| 2009–2011 | WSG Wattens | 58 | (12) |
| 2011–2012 | Wacker Innsbruck Amateure | 20 | (4) |
| 2012 | Wacker Innsbruck | 2 | (0) |
| 2012– | First Vienna FC | 3 | (0) |
- * Club domestic league appearances and goals as of 14 October 2012 (UTC)

Mathias Perktold (born 17 April 1987) is an Austrian footballer.
