= Mirnes Becirovic =

Austrian footballer (born 1989)

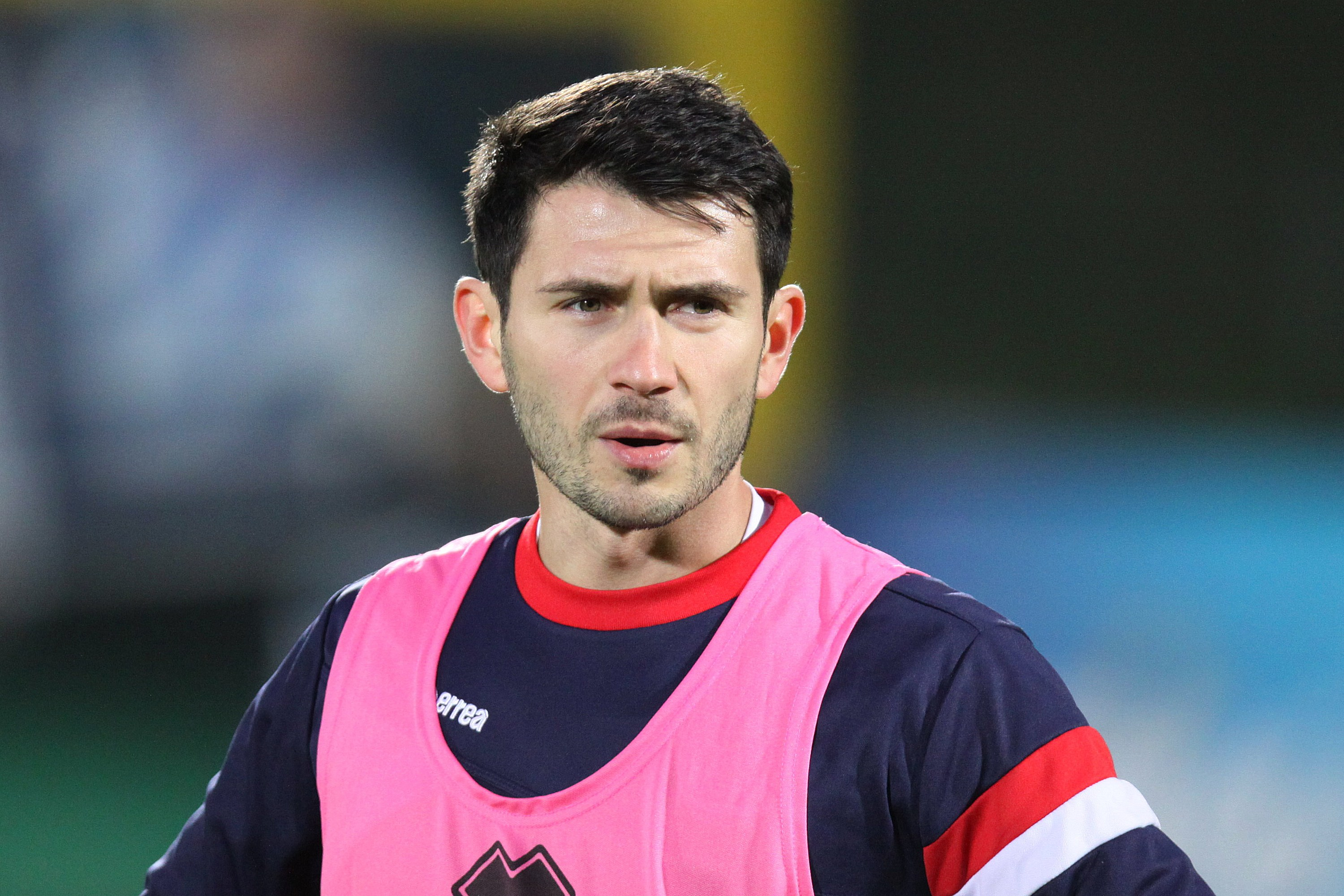
- Becirovic in 2015

Personal information
- Date of birth: 10 January 1989 (age 37)
- Place of birth: Brčko, Bosnia and Herzegovina
- Height: 1.75 m (5 ft 9 in)
- Position: Midfielder

Team information
- Current team: Floridsdorfer AC
- Number: 19

Youth career
- 2003–2008: St. Pölten

Senior career*
Years	Team	Apps	(Gls)
2008–2012	St. Pölten	92	(2)
2012–2014	Vienna	67	(10)
2014–2016	Austria Klagenfurt	51	(0)
2016–	Floridsdorfer AC	275	(12)

International career
2006	Austria U18	1	(0)
- * Club domestic league appearances and goals as of 17 May 2026

Mirnes Becirovic (born 10 January 1989) is an Austrian footballer who played in the First League for SKN St. Pölten and Vienna. He currently plays for Floridsdorfer AC.
