= Joan Henríquez =

Chilean footballer (born 1986)

Personal information
- Full name: Joan Alexander Henríquez Contreras
- Date of birth: 24 April 1986 (age 40)
- Place of birth: Santiago, Chile
- Height: 1.71 m (5 ft 7 1/2 in)
- Position: Midfielder

Youth career
- 1998–2004: Palestino

Senior career*
Years	Team	Apps	(Gls)
2005–2007	Palestino	70	(5)
2008–2013	O'Higgins	65	(2)
2010	→ Palestino (loan)	14	(0)
2011	→ Cobresal (loan)	17	(2)
2012	→ Deportes Copiapó (loan)	25	(2)
2013	First Vienna	1	(0)
2014–2015	Iberia	19	(1)
Total		211	(12)

Managerial career
- 2017: Palestino (youth)
- * Club domestic league appearances and goals

Joan Alexander Henríquez Contreras (born 24 April 1986) is a Chilean former footballer who played as a midfielder. Besides Chile, he played in Austria.

== Career ==
A product of the Palestino youth system, Henríquez also played for O'Higgins and Cobresal in the Chilean top division. In the third level, he played for Deportes Copiapó, getting promotion to the upper level in 2012.

In 2013, he moved to Austria and had a trial with Admira Wacker before joining First Vienna in the second level.

Back in Chile, he played for Iberia, his last club.

Following his retirement, he graduated as a football manager and has served as coach of the Palestino youth ranks and several amateur clubs in his homeland.
