= Mahmud Imamoglu =

Austrian footballer (born 1991)

Mahmut Imamoglu
Personal information
- Date of birth: 23 January 1991 (age 35)
- Position: Defender

Team information
- Current team: SC Ritzing
- Number: 6

Senior career*
Years	Team	Apps	(Gls)
2008–2011	Vienna	47	(0)
2011	İstanbul Güngörenspor	0	(0)
2012	SC Wiener Neustadt	8	(0)
2013–	SC Ritzing	12	(1)
- * Club domestic league appearances and goals as of 15 May 2013 (UTC)

Mahmut Selim Imamoglu (born 23 January 1991) is an Austrian footballer.
