= Bernhard Fucik =

Austrian footballer

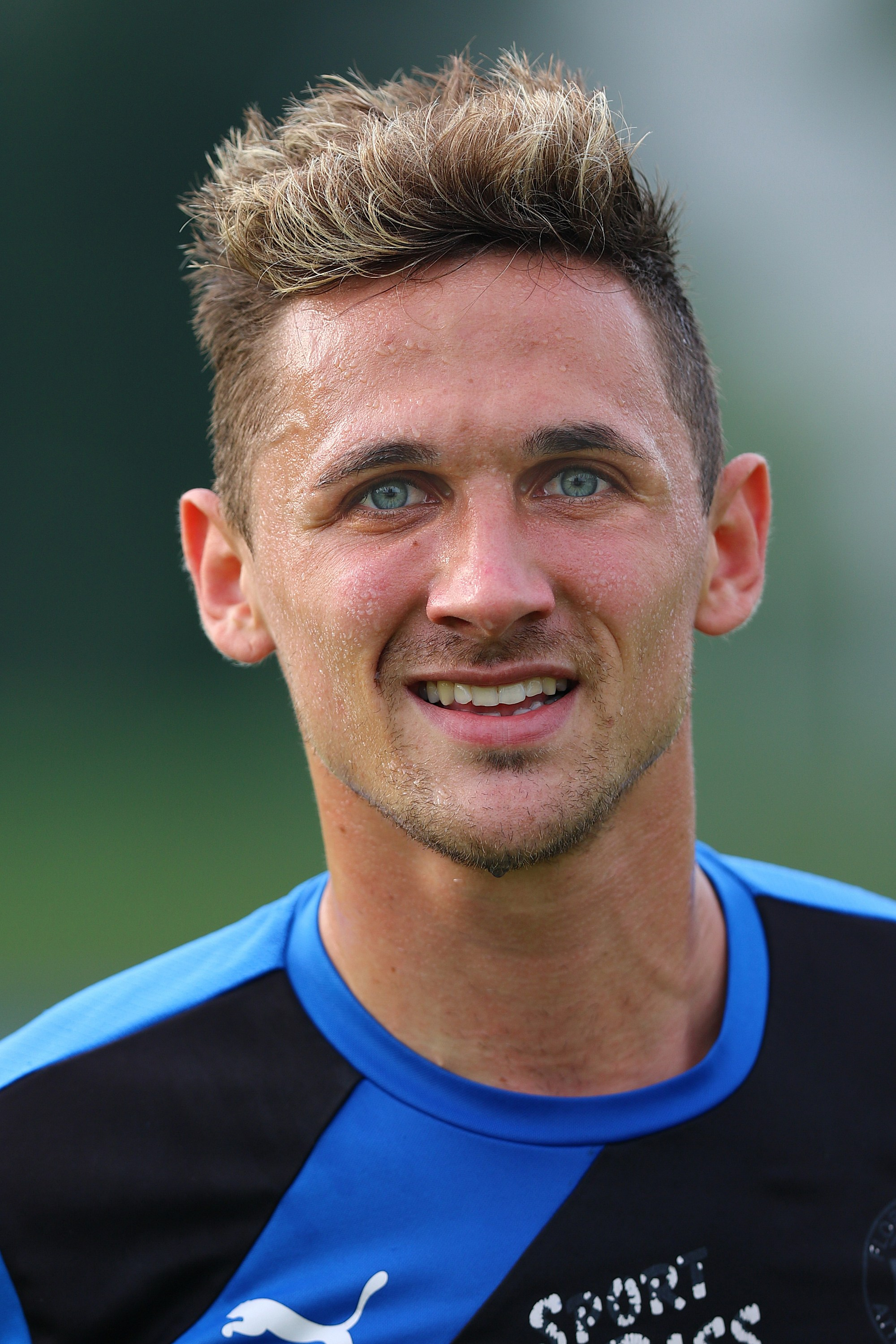
- SC Wiener Neustadt vs. Floridsdorfer AC, von Benutzer Steindy 2018

Personal information
- Date of birth: 26 September 1990 (age 36)
- Place of birth: Wiener Neustadt, Austria
- Height: 1.88 m (6 ft 2 in)
- Positions: Forward; winger

Team information
- Current team: SC Katzelsdorf
- Number: 7

Youth career
- 1997–2005: SvG Breitenau/Schwarzau
- 2005: SV Weikersdorf
- 2005–2008: SvG Breitenau/Schwarzau

Senior career*
Years	Team	Apps	(Gls)
2008–2010	SC Neudörfl	42	(4)
2010–2011	UFC Purbach	26	(11)
2011–2012	FC Sollenau	28	(4)
2012–2014	Admira Wacker	6	(0)
2013	→ First Vienna (loan)	15	(2)
2013–2014	Admira Wacker II	27	(9)
2014–2015	St. Pölten	14	(0)
2015–2016	First Vienna	22	(0)
2016–2017	Austria Klagenfurt	22	(8)
2017–2018	FAC	26	(0)
2018–2019	FCM Traiskirchen	16	(1)
2019–2020	First Vienna	28	(12)
2020–2021	FavAC	10	(5)
2021–2022	SVg Breitenau/Schwarzau	24	(9)
2023–	SC Katzelsdorf	0	(0)
- * Club domestic league appearances and goals as of 17:30, 12 March 2023 (UTC)

Bernhard Fucik (born 26 September 1990) is an Austrian professional footballer who plays as a forward or winger for SC Katzelsdorf.
