= Marco Salvatore =

Austrian footballer (born 1986)

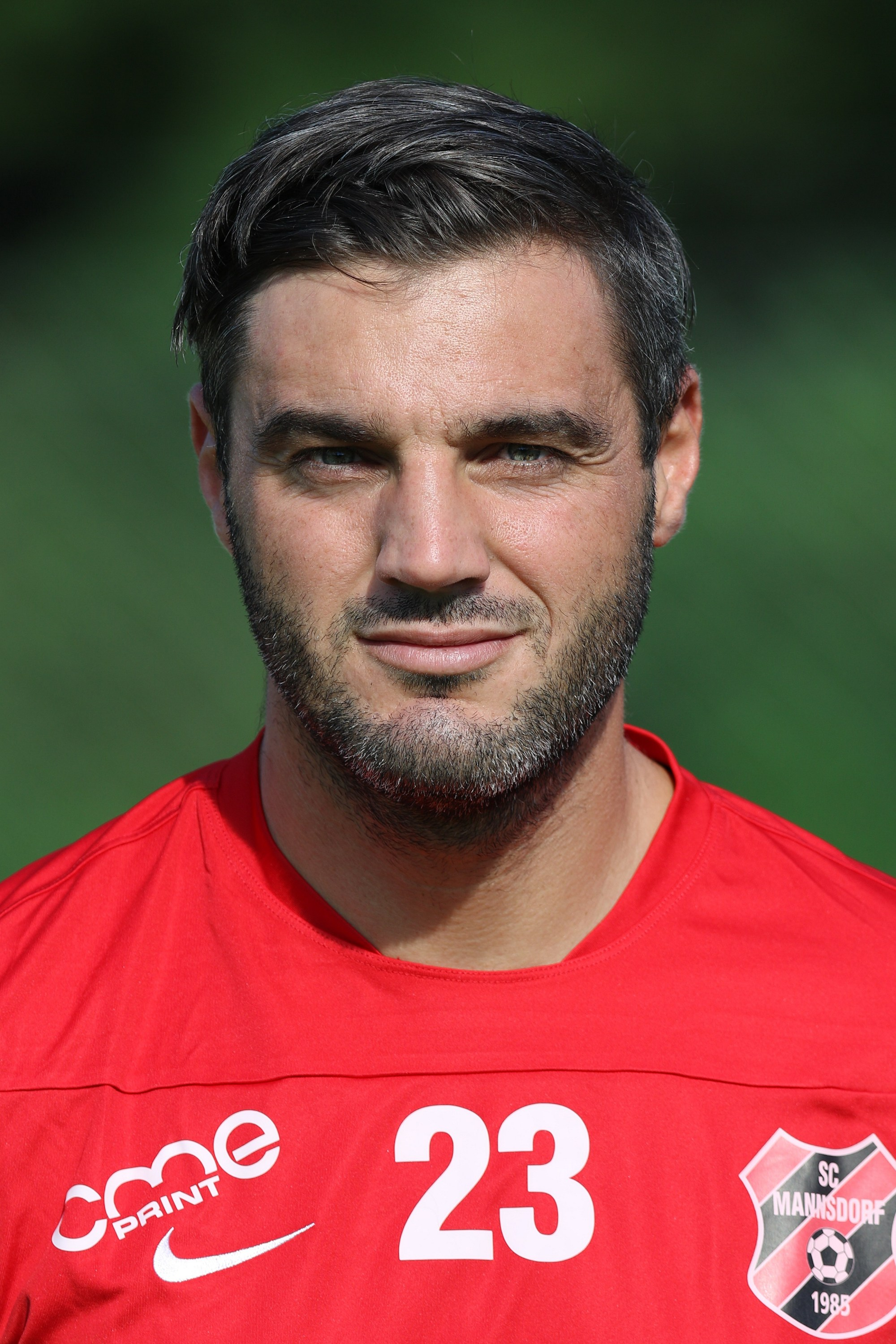
- Salvatore in 2016

Personal information
- Date of birth: 20 February 1986 (age 40)
- Place of birth: Schwarzach, Vorarlberg, Austria
- Height: 1.76 m (5 ft 9 1/2 in)
- Position: Defender

Senior career*
Years	Team	Apps	(Gls)
2003–2007	Austria Wien Amateure	79	(5)
2007–2009	Vöcklabruck	32	(3)
2009–2010	Austria Kärnten	35	(0)
2010–2012	First Vienna FC	63	(0)
2012–	SV Horn	28	(1)

International career^{‡}
2003	Austria under-17	4	(0)
2005	Austria under-19	3	(0)
- * Club domestic league appearances and goals as of 15:04, 20 September 2013 (UTC) ‡ National team caps and goals as of 15:04, 20 September 2013 (UTC)

Marco Salvatore (born 20 February 1986) is an Austrian professional association football player currently playing for SV Horn in the Austrian Football First League.
