= Bartoloměj Kuru =

Austrian footballer

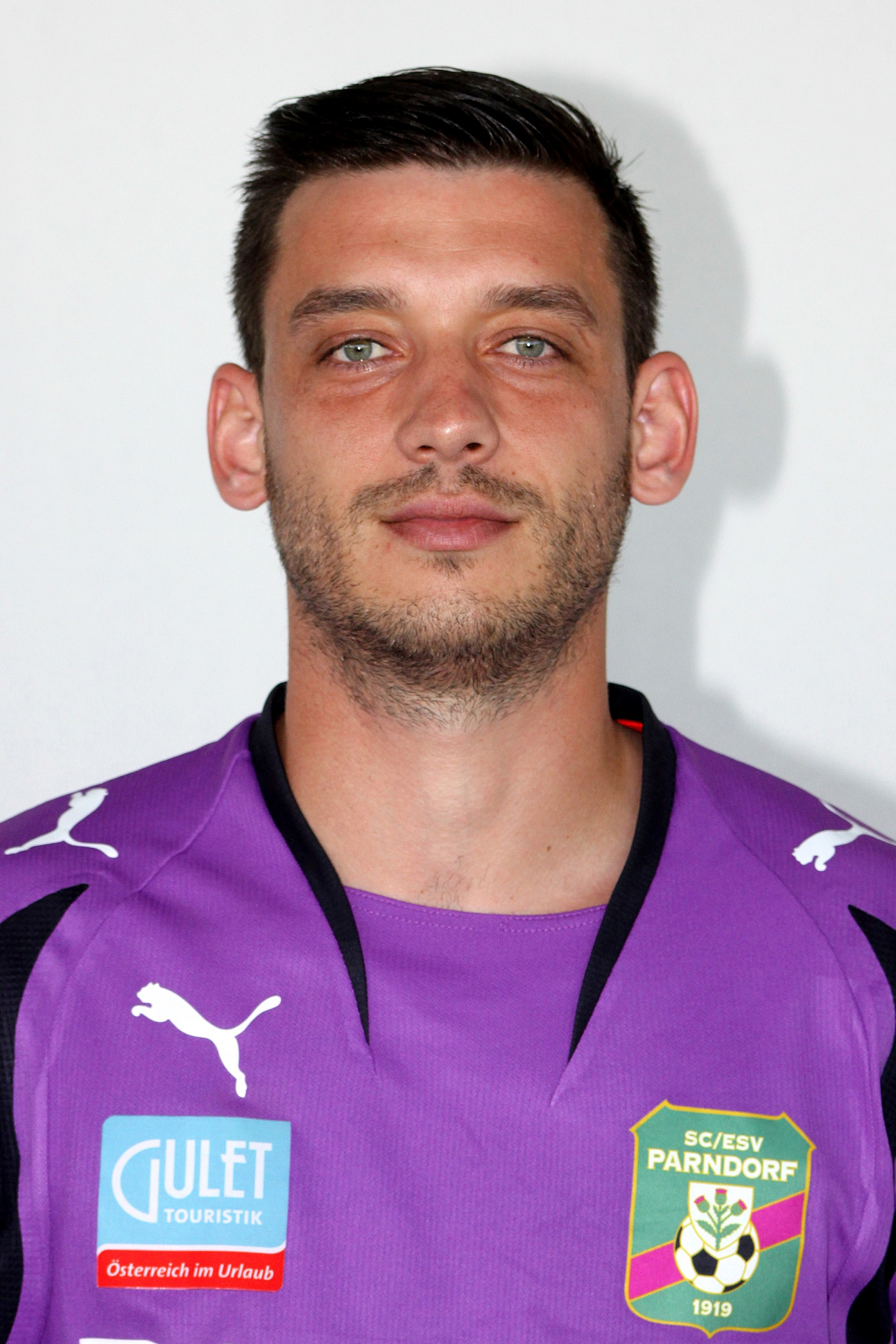
- Kuru in 2013

Personal information
- Full name: Bartoloměj Kuru
- Date of birth: 6 April 1987 (age 39)
- Place of birth: Nymburk, Czechoslovakia
- Height: 1.85 m (6 ft 1 in)
- Position: Goalkeeper

Team information
- Current team: SC Maria Lanzendorf

Youth career
- 1997–1998: Austria Vienna
- 1998–2000: LASK Linz
- 2000–2004: Standard Liège
- 2004–2005: Austria Vienna

Senior career*
Years	Team	Apps	(Gls)
2004–2008	Austria Vienna II	84	(0)
2005	→ LASK Linz (loan)	2	(0)
2005–2008	Austria Wien	1	(0)
2009	Grödig	6	(0)
2009–2010	DAC Dunajská Streda	2	(0)
2010–2011	First Vienna	17	(0)
2012–2013	Bohemians 1905	17	(0)
2013–2014	Parndorf	0	(0)
2015	Austria Klagenfurt	0	(0)
2015–2016	St. Pölten II	32	(0)
2017–2019	Bruck/Leitha	54	(0)
2019–2020	Wiener Neustadt	17	(0)
2020–2021	Mauerwerk	4	(0)
2021	Neusiedl/See	13	(0)
2023–	SC Maria Lanzendorf	0	(0)

International career
2003–2004	Austria U17	9	(0)
2004–2005	Austria U18	3	(0)
2005–2006	Austria U19	16	(0)
2008–2009	Austria U21	4	(0)
- * Club domestic league appearances and goals as of 23 October 2021

Bartoloměj Kuru (born 6 April 1987) is an Austrian footballer who plays as a goalkeeper for SC Maria Lanzendorf.

== Club career ==
Kuru made his FK Austria debut at the age of 16 in 2002–03. He was primarily a reserve to Szabolcs Sáfár since then, although he did spend part of the 2004–05 season on loan to LASK Linz. He also experienced regular competitive action playing for FK Austria's Amateure (reserve) side in the Austrian Football First League.

In summer 2008 his contract with FK Austria was terminated. On 12 January 2009 he signed with SV Grödig and in summer 2009 signed for DAC Dunajská Streda.

== International career ==
In the summer of 2007, aged 20, he was selected to play for Austria at the U-20 World Cup in Canada, reaching the semi-finals with his team.

== Personal ==
Kuru has appeared for the Austrian national youth teams from under-17 to the under-21 team. He is of Czech descent.
