= Rade Đokić =

Bosnian footballer (born 1983)

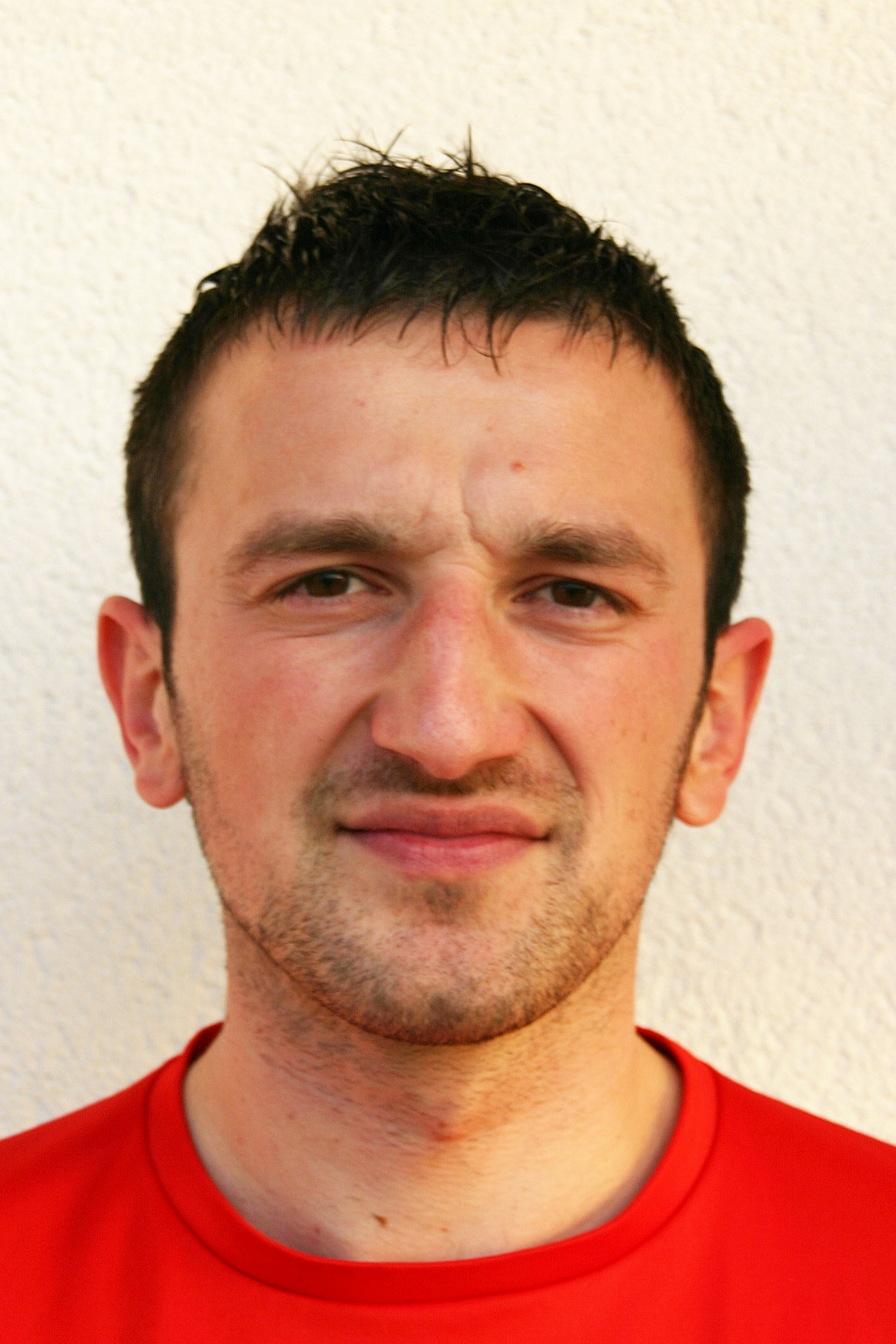

Personal information
- Date of birth: 23 June 1983 (age 43)
- Place of birth: Zvornik, SFR Yugoslavia
- Height: 1.80 m (5 ft 11 in)
- Position: Forward

Senior career*
Years	Team	Apps	(Gls)
- Drina Zvornik
1999–2003	Kabel		
2003–2004	Srem		
2004–2005	Zvezdara		
2005–2006	Kapfenberger SV	29	(14)
2006–2007	Grazer AK	18	(6)
2007–2008	SV Ried	25	(1)
2008–2009	Vöcklabruck	30	(10)
2009–2010	Austria Wien II	27	(13)
2010–2012	First Vienna	54	(22)
2012	Sunkar	11	(3)
2013	Wiener SK	13	(13)
2013	Wiener Viktoria	15	(13)
2014–2015	Vorwärts Steyr	39	(31)
- * Club domestic league appearances and goals

Rade Đokić (Serbian Cyrillic: Раде Ђокић; born 23 June 1983) is a Bosnian-Herzegovinian former professional footballer who played as a forward.

== Club career ==
Born in Zvornik, SR Bosnia and Herzegovina, Ðokić started his career at FK Drina Zvornik before moving to Serbia where he represented FK Kabel, FK Srem and FK Zvezdara. He was playing in the youth team of FK Kabel when he debuted for the first team in the season 1999–2000 of the Second League of FR Yugoslavia when being only 16 years old.

In 2005, he moved to Austria where, after spending one year with Kapfenberger SV, in summer of 2006 he joined Grazer AK, where he partnered with countryman Samir Muratović. He will also play with SV Ried, 1. FC Vöcklabruck, Austria Wien II and First Vienna FC, before leaving Austria and joining Kazakhstan Premier League side FC Sunkar in summer 2012.
