= Marco Miesenböck =

Austrian footballer

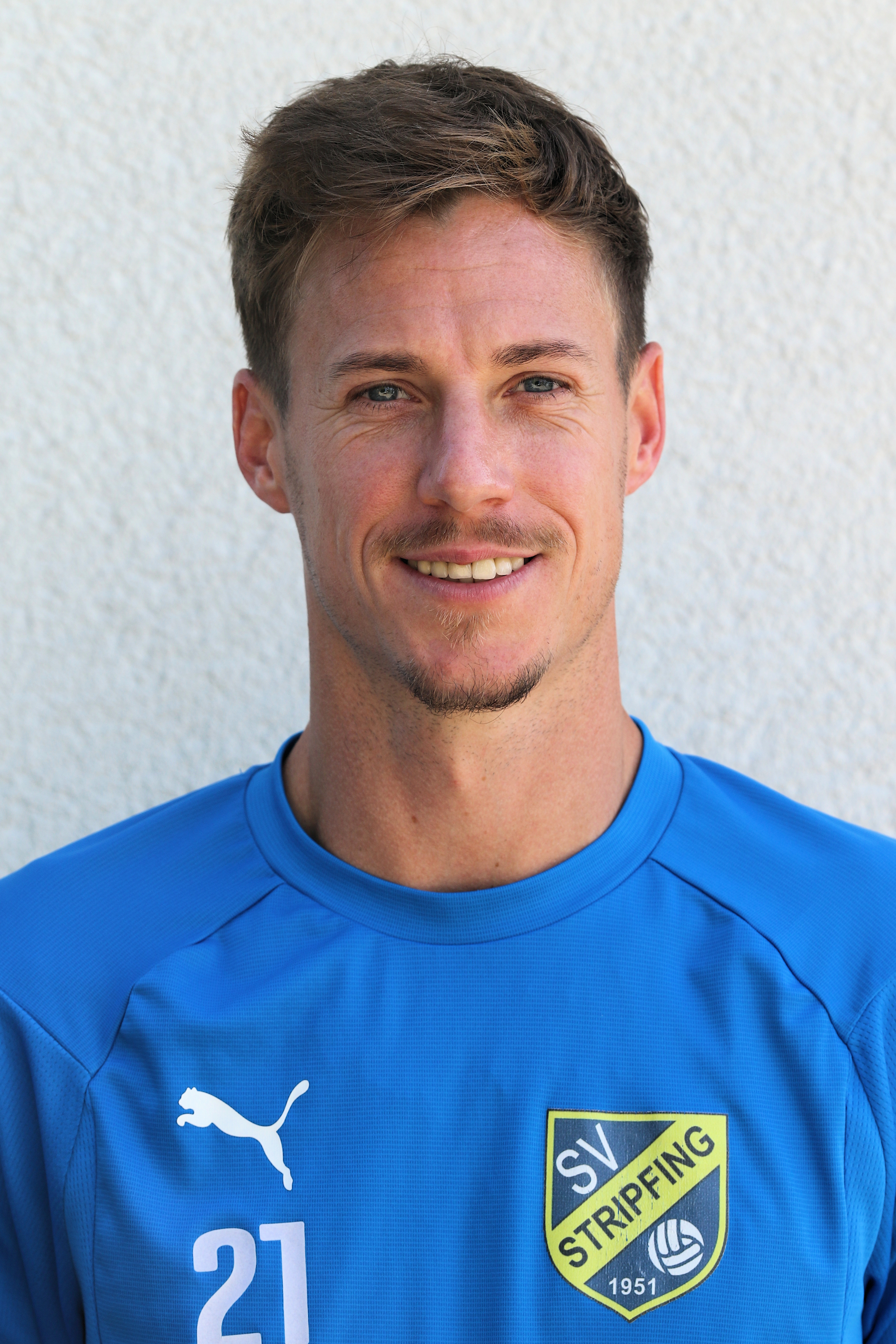
- Miesenböck in 2019

Personal information
- Date of birth: 30 April 1989 (age 37)
- Position: Forward

Team information
- Current team: Vienna
- Number: 17

Youth career
- –2008: AKA Kärnten

Senior career*
Years	Team	Apps	(Gls)
2007–2008	FC Kärnten II	2	(0)
2008–2009	Austria Kärnten	0	(0)
2009–2011	SV Horn	44	(16)
2011–2012	SC Austria Lustenau	23	(0)
2013–2014	First Vienna	41	(8)
2014–	Kottingbrunn	0	(0)
- * Club domestic league appearances and goals as of 16:47, 21 August 2014 (UTC)

Marco Miesenböck (born 30 April 1989) is an Austrian footballer who plays for Kottingbrunn. He previously played in the First League for Austria Lustenau from July 2011 until November 2012 and for First Vienna from January 2013 until July 2014. His youthclubs are situated in his home-city Klagenfurt: FC Kaernten/AKA Kaernten and FC Welzenegg (until July 2009). Then he changed to Lower Austria and played for "SV Horn" from July 2009 until July 2011.
