= Markus Speiser =

Austrian footballer

Personal information
- Date of birth: 5 March 1985 (age 41)
- Position: Defender

Team information
- Current team: Vienna
- Number: 2

Youth career
- –2004: SKN St. Pölten

Senior career*
Years	Team	Apps	(Gls)
2004–2012	SKN St. Pölten	163	(0)
2012–	Vienna	28	(0)
- * Club domestic league appearances and goals as of 23 May 2013 (UTC)

Markus Speiser (born 5 March 1985) is an Austrian footballer who played in the First League for clubs including SKN St. Pölten and First Vienna.
