= Daniel Weber (footballer) =

Austrian footballer

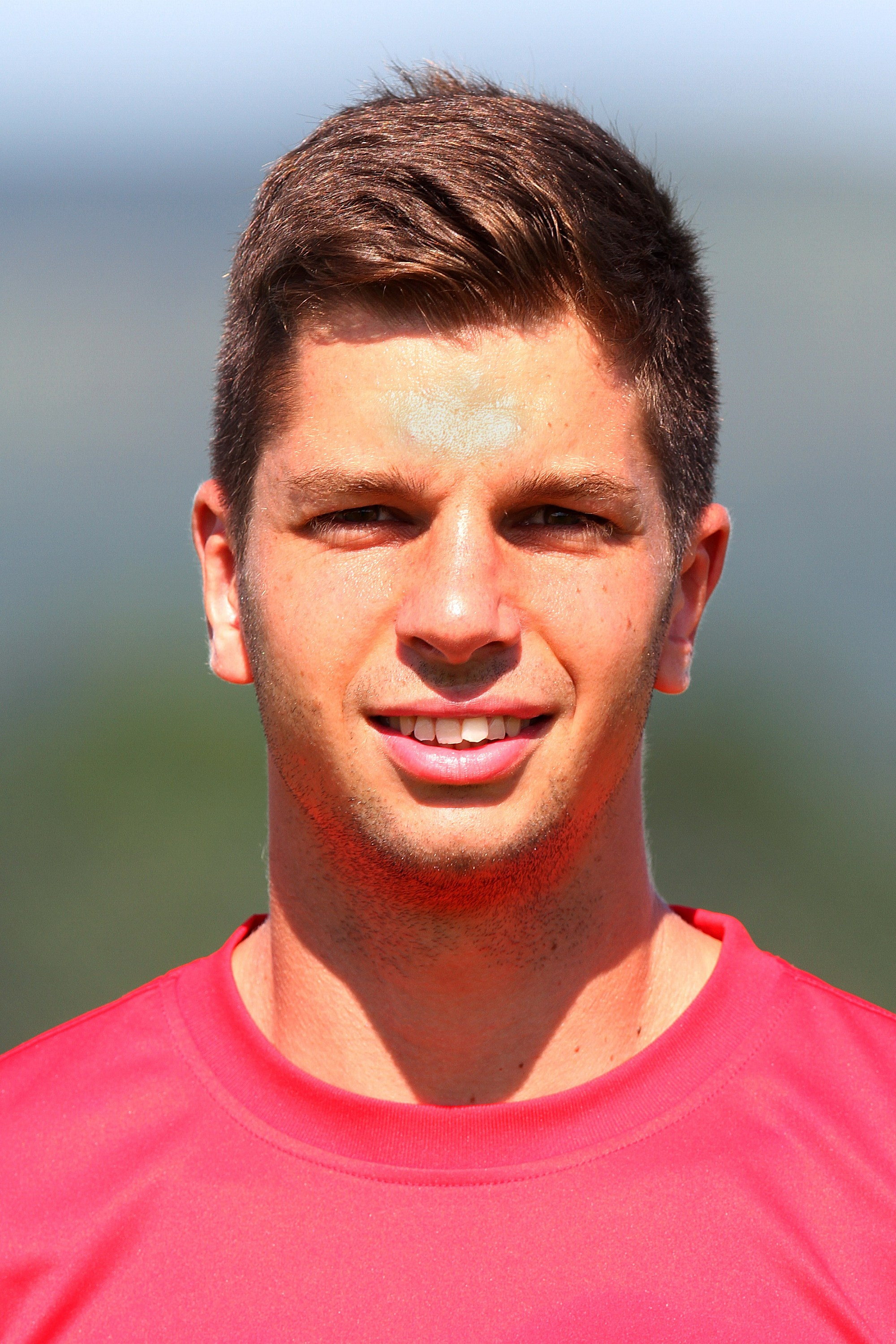
- Weber in 2016

Personal information
- Date of birth: 27 February 1990 (age 36)
- Place of birth: Wien, Austria
- Height: 1.90 m (6 ft 3 in)
- Position: Forward

Team information
- Current team: Bad Vöslau
- Number: 6

Youth career
- 1997–2001: ASK Erlaa
- 2001–2008: Admira Wacker

Senior career*
Years	Team	Apps	(Gls)
2008–2009	SV Würmla	8	(1)
2009	Wiener Viktoria	14	(11)
2009–2010	FAC Team für Wien	21	(0)
2010–2011	First Vienna	8	(0)
2011–2012	Schwadorf 1936	12	(3)
2012	Simmeringer SC	8	(0)
2012–2013	SV Stripfing	21	(5)
2013–2015	ASK Kaltenleutgeben		
2015–2016	HNK Cibalia	8	(2)
2016	FAC Wien	11	(1)
2016–2018	Wiener Viktoria	36	(8)
2018–	Bad Vöslau	98	(54)
- * Club domestic league appearances and goals as of 20:15, 19 October 2023 (UTC)

Daniel Weber (born 27 February 1990) is an Austrian footballer who plays as a forward for ASK Bad Vöslau.
