= Wolfgang Mair =

Austrian footballer

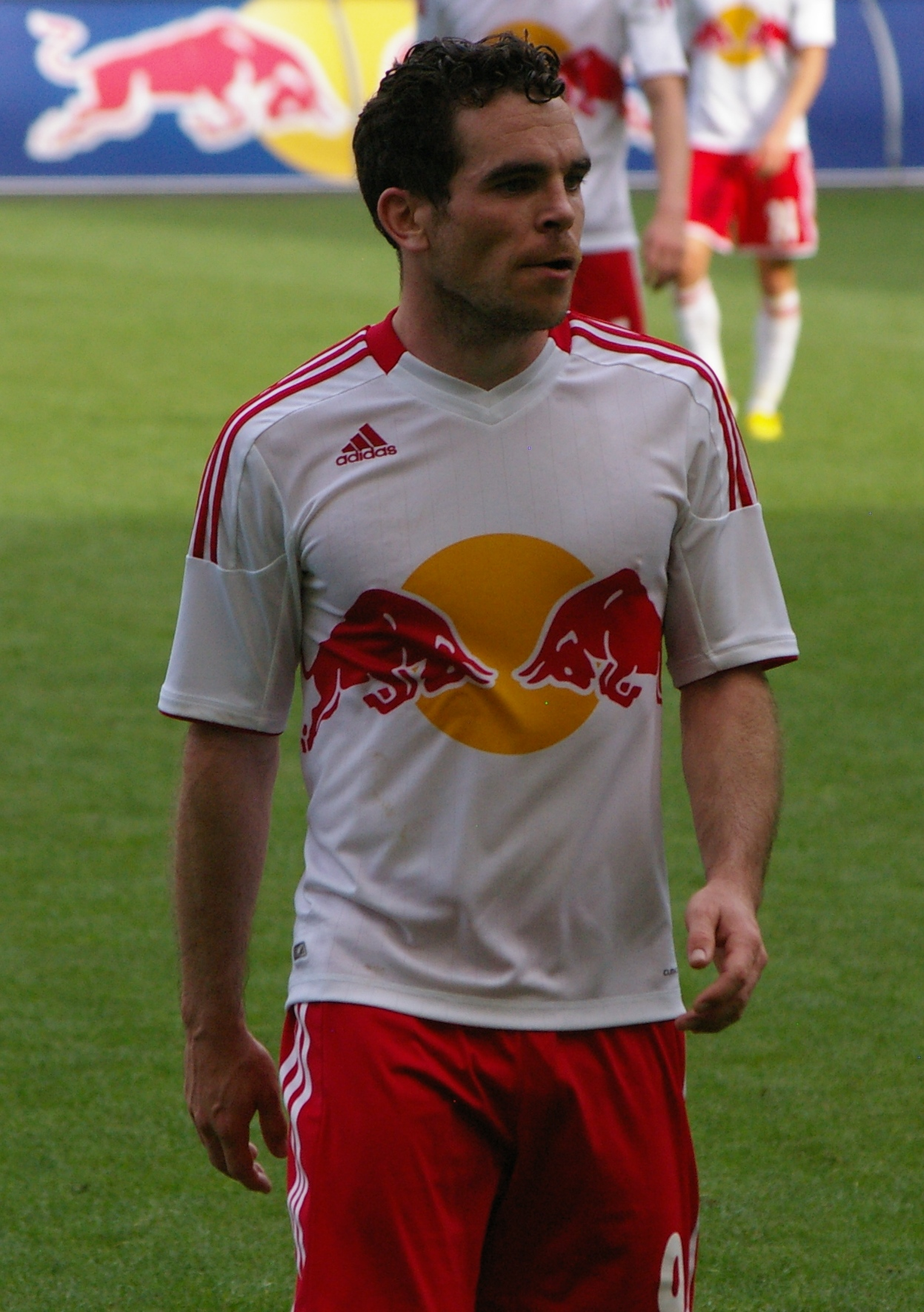

Personal information
- Full name: Wolfgang Mario Mair
- Date of birth: February 17, 1980 (age 46)
- Place of birth: Lienz, Austria
- Height: 1.72 m (5 ft 7 1/2 in)
- Position: Striker

Youth career
- Rapid Lienz

Senior career*
Years	Team	Apps	(Gls)
1998–2002	FC Wacker Tirol	84	(9)
2002–2003	SV Pasching	34	(0)
2003–2005	FC Wacker Tirol	65	(25)
2005–2006	Red Bull Salzburg	23	(0)
2006–2008	FK Austria Wien	41	(4)
2008–2010	Austria Kärnten	28	(2)
2011–2012	Vienna	48	(10)
2012–	FC Liefering	37	(10)

International career^{‡}
1998–2001	Austria U-21	10	(1)
2005	Austria	3	(0)
- * Club domestic league appearances and goals as of 15 June 2012 ‡ National team caps and goals as of 8 August 2009

Wolfgang Mair (born 17 February 1980) is an Austrian footballer.

== Club career ==
Born in East Tyrol, the diminutive Mair started his professional career at FC Tirol Innsbruck and stayed with them for 7 years, besides one season in between at SV Pasching. He won three league titles at Tirol and moved to ambitious Red Bull Salzburg in 2005 only to leave them after one season playing off the substitutes' bench for Vienna giants Austria Wien. He won the Austrian Cup with them and joined Austria Kärnten in summer 2008.

== International career ==
He made his debut for Austria in a February 2005 friendly match against Latvia. He earned 3 caps, no goal scored. His other two international games were March 2005 World Cup qualification matches against Wales.

== Honours ==
- Austrian Football Bundesliga (3):
  - 2000, 2001, 2002
- Austrian Cup (1):
  - 2007
