= Marcel Toth =

Austrian footballer

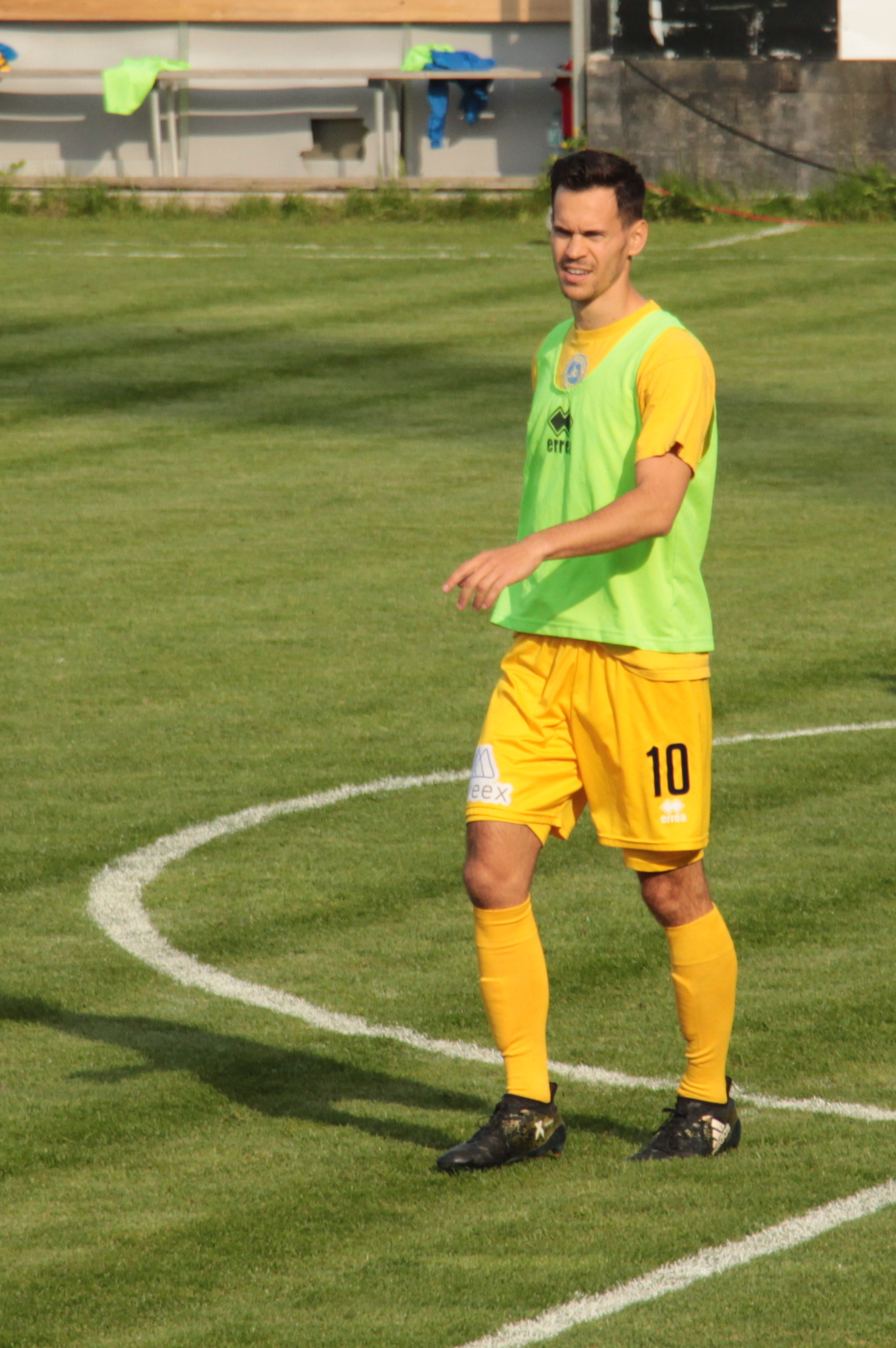
- Toth in 2017

Personal information
- Date of birth: 14 June 1989 (age 37)
- Place of birth: Vienna, Austria
- Height: 1.80 m (5 ft 11 in)
- Position: Midfielder

Team information
- Current team: First Vienna
- Number: 25

Youth career
- 1995–2002: SC Neusiedl am See 1919
- 2002–2006: AKA Burgenland

Senior career*
Years	Team	Apps	(Gls)
2006–2008	SC Neusiedl am See 1919	44	(11)
2008–2011	SK Rapid Wien II	16	(0)
2010–2011	→ First Vienna (loan)	36	(1)
2011–2012	First Vienna	25	(2)
2012–2016	SV Horn	72	(3)
2017	First Vienna	9	(1)
2017–2020	SV Horn	81	(12)
2020–	First Vienna	36	(4)

International career
2006	Austria U18	1	(0)
2007	Austria U19	4	(0)
- * Club domestic league appearances and goals as of 20 June 2023

Marcel Toth (born 14 June 1989) is an Austrian footballer who plays for First Vienna.
