= Richard Strohmayer =

Austrian footballer and coach

Personal information
- Date of birth: 16 March 1981 (age 45)
- Position: Midfielder

Team information
- Current team: Vienna
- Number: 27

Youth career
- –1991: SR Donaufeld
- 1991–1992: FC Admira Wacker Mödling
- 1992–1993: Austria Wien
- 1993–1998: FC Admira Wacker Mödling

Senior career*
Years	Team	Apps	(Gls)
1998–2000	FC Admira Wacker Mödling	4	(0)
2000–2004	FC Untersiebenbrunn	105	(9)
2004	FAC Team für Wien		
2004–2005	ASK Schwadorf 1936		
2005–2008	SV Bad Aussee		
2008–	Vienna	95	(1)
2011–	Vienna Amateure		

International career
2002	Austria U21	1	(0)

Managerial career
- 2011–: Vienna Amateure
- * Club domestic league appearances and goals as of 23 May 2013 (UTC)

Richard Strohmayer (born 16 March 1981) is an Austrian footballer and coach. As a player, he last played in the First League for First Vienna.
