= Mario Kröpfl (footballer, born 1991) =

Austrian footballer

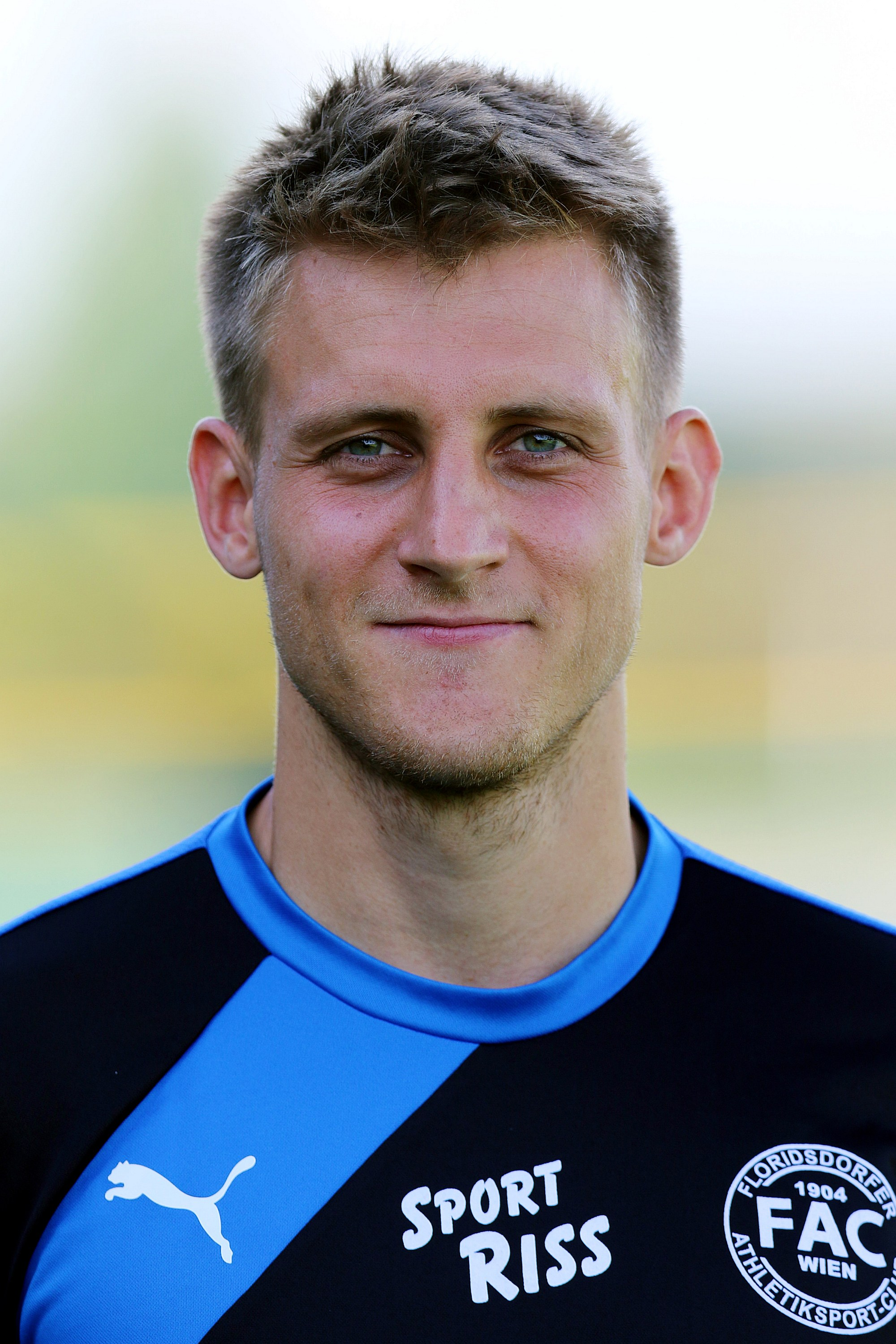
- Kröpfl in 2016

Personal information
- Date of birth: 29 September 1991 (age 35)
- Place of birth: Wien, Austria
- Height: 1.83 m (6 ft 0 in)
- Position: Left back

Youth career
- 2002–2008: First Vienna

Senior career*
Years	Team	Apps	(Gls)
2008–2016	First Vienna	151	(6)
2016–2018	FAC	67	(7)
2018–2019	Ried	21	(2)
- * Club domestic league appearances and goals as of 00:24, 29 July 2019 (UTC)

Mario Kröpfl (born 29 September 1991) is an Austrian footballer. He most recently played for SV Ried.
