= Judaism and warfare =

Judaism's views on warfare

Normative Judaism's views on warfare are defined by restraint that is neither guided by avidness for belligerence nor is it categorically pacifist. Traditionally, self-defense has been the underpinning principle for the sanctioned use of violence, with the maintenance of peace taking precedence over waging war. While the biblical narrative about the conquest of Canaan and the commands related to it have had a deep influence on Western culture, mainstream Jewish traditions throughout history have treated these texts as purely historical or highly conditioned, and in either case not relevant to contemporary life. However, some minor strains of radical Zionism promote aggressive war and justify them with biblical texts.

Contemporary warfare conducted by the State of Israel is governed by Israeli law and regulation, which includes a purity of arms code that is based in part on Jewish tradition. Tension between the conduct of the Israeli government and Jewish traditions and halakha on the conduct of war have caused controversy within Israel and have provided a basis for criticisms of Israel.

== Views of violence in Judaism ==
Judaism's doctrines and texts have sometimes been associated with violence. Laws requiring the eradication of evil, sometimes using violent means, exist in the Jewish tradition. Judaism also contains peaceful doctrines. Attitudes and laws towards both peace and violence exist within the Jewish tradition. Throughout history, Judaism's religious texts or precepts have been used to promote as well as oppose violence.

Normative Judaism is not pacifist and violence is permissible in the service of self-defense. J. Patout Burns asserts that Jewish tradition clearly posits the principle of minimization of violence. This principle can be stated as "(wherever) Jewish law allows violence to keep an evil from occurring, it mandates that the minimal amount of violence be used to accomplish one's goal."

== General teachings on war ==
The ancient orders like those of wars for Israel to eradicate idol worshiping do not apply today. Jews are not taught to glorify violence. The rabbis of the Talmud saw war as an avoidable evil. A passage in Pirkei Avot reads, "The sword comes to the world for the delay of judgment, and for the perversion of judgment," In Judaism, war is evil—albeit, at times, a necessary one—yet, Judaism teaches that one has to go to great length to avoid it.

The Talmud insists that before going to non-defensive war, the king would need to seek authorization from the Sanhedrin, as well as divine approval through the High Priest. As these institutions have not existed for 2,000 years, this virtually rules out the possibility of non-defensive war.

The permissibility of war is limited and the requirement is that one always seek a just peace before waging war. Some modern Jewish scholars hold that biblical texts authorizing offensive war no longer apply, and that Jewish theology instructs Jews to leave vengeance to God.

Jewish writers in the 2nd-century CE defined their wars as either a mandatory war, a religious war, or a voluntary war.

== Wars of extermination in the Tanakh and Jewish responses ==
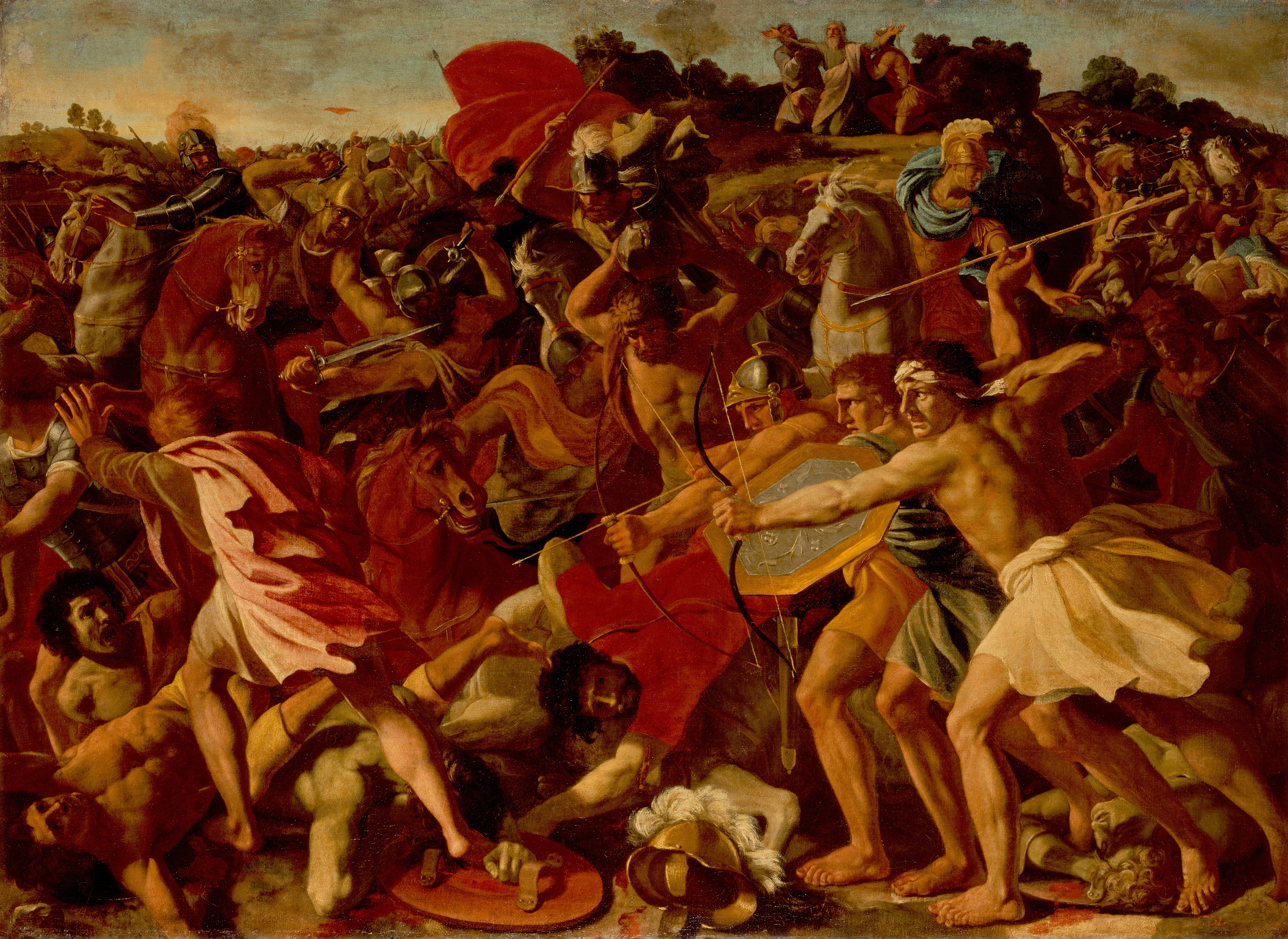
The Victory of Joshua over the Amalekites, by Nicolas Poussin

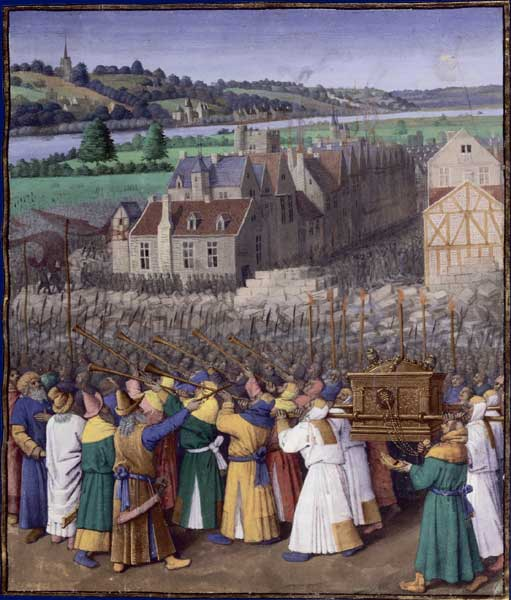
Jean Fouquet: The Taking of Jericho, c. 1452–1460

The Tanakh (Jewish Bible) contains commandments that require the Israelites to exterminate seven Canaanite nations, and describes several wars of extermination that annihilated entire cities or groups of peoples. The targets of the "extermination commandments" were the seven Canaanite nations explicitly identified by God in Deut 7:1–2 and Deut 20:16–18. These seven tribes are Hittites, Girgashites, Amorites, Canaanites, Perizzites, Hivites, and Jebusites. Most of these descended from the biblical figure Canaan, as described in Gen 10:15–18. In addition, two others tribes were subject to wars of extermination: Amalekites (1 Samuel 15:1–20) and Midianites (Numbers 31:1–18). The extermination of the Canaanite nations is described primarily in the Book of Joshua (especially Joshua 10:28–42) which includes the Battle of Jericho described in Joshua 6:15–21. (Note: Modern historians have cast doubt on the Joshua narrative of the Canaanite's destruction. While the Hebrew Bible contrasts the Canaanites ethnically from the Ancient Israelites, modern scholars Jonathan Tubb and Mark Smith have theorized the kingdoms of Israel and Judah to be a subset of Canaanite culture, based on their archaeological and linguistic interpretations. There is no archeological evidence for any war between Israelites and Canaanites at the time, so many believe the conquest was actually a societal revolution.)

Wars of extermination are referred to in several of Judaism's biblical commandments, known as the 613 Mitzvot:

- Not to keep alive any individual of the seven Canaanite nations (Deut. 20:16)
- To exterminate the seven Canaanite nations from the land of Israel (Deut. 20:17)
- Always to remember what Amalek did (Deut. 25:17)
- That the evil done to us by Amalek shall not be forgotten (Deut. 25:19)
- To blot out the name (or memory) of Amalek (or, according to Maimonides: to destroy the seed of Amalek) (Deut. 25:19)

The extent of extermination is described in the commandment Deut 20:16–18 which orders the Israelites to "not leave alive anything that breathes... completely destroy them ...." and on 1 Samuel 15 "Now, go and crush Amalek; put him under the curse of destruction with all that he possesses. Do not spare him, but kill man and woman, babe and suckling, ox and sheep, camel and donkey." Rabbinical commentator Rashi elaborates on this commandment: "From man unto woman, from infant unto suckling, from ox unto sheep, so that the name of Amalek not be mentioned even with reference to an animal by [someone] saying: 'This animal belonged to the Amalekites'."

=== Jewish responses ===
In Talmudic commentary, the Canaanite nations were given the opportunity to leave, and their refusal to leave "lay the onus of blame for the conquest and Joshua's extirpation of the Canaanites at the feet of the victims." Another explanation of the exterminations is that God gave the land to the Canaanites only temporarily, until the Israelites would arrive, and the Canaanites extermination was punishment for their refusal to obey God's desire that they leave. Another Talmudic explanation - for the wars in the Book of Joshua - was that God initiated the wars as a diversionary tactic so Israelites would not kill Joshua after discovering that Joshua had forgotten certain laws.

A formal declaration that the "seven nations" are no longer identifiable was made by Joshua ben Hananiah, around the year 100 CE, making laws of exterminating war a dead letter.

Maimonides explained that the commandment of destroying the nation of Amalek requires the Jewish people to peacefully request of them to accept upon themselves the Noachide laws.

Some commentators, such as Rabbi Hayim Palaggi (1788–1869) argued that Jews had lost the tradition of distinguishing Amalekites from other people, and therefore the commandment of killing them could never practically be applied.

Scholar Moshe Greenberg asserts that the laws of extermination applied only to the extinct tribes, and only to their contemporary generations of Israelites. Scholar Carl Ehrlich states the biblical rules of extermination provide guidance to modern Israelis not for genocidal purposes, but rather simply as models for reclaiming the land of Israel.

Contemporary Jewish biblical scholar Sidney Hoenig discussed the "brutality" in the book of Joshua, and emphasized that it is a story, and that the purpose of the story was to increase the glory of God.

Scholar Carl Ehrlich states that Jewish commentators have tended to be silent regarding the morality of the violence in the Book of Joshua. Prominent atheist Richard Dawkins asserts that the commandments to exterminate are immoral.

Several Jewish scholars have characterized the exterminations as stories of genocide. Scholar Shaul Magid characterizes the commandment to exterminate the Midianites as a "genocidal edict", and asserts that rabbinical tradition continues to defend the edict into the twentieth century. Scholar Ra'anan S. Boustan asserts that – in the modern era – the violence directed towards the Canaanites would be characterized as genocide. Scholar Carl Ehrlich characterizes the Battle of Jericho and the conquest of the Canaanite nations as genocide. Scholar Zev Garber characterizes the commandment to wage war on the Amalekites as genocide.

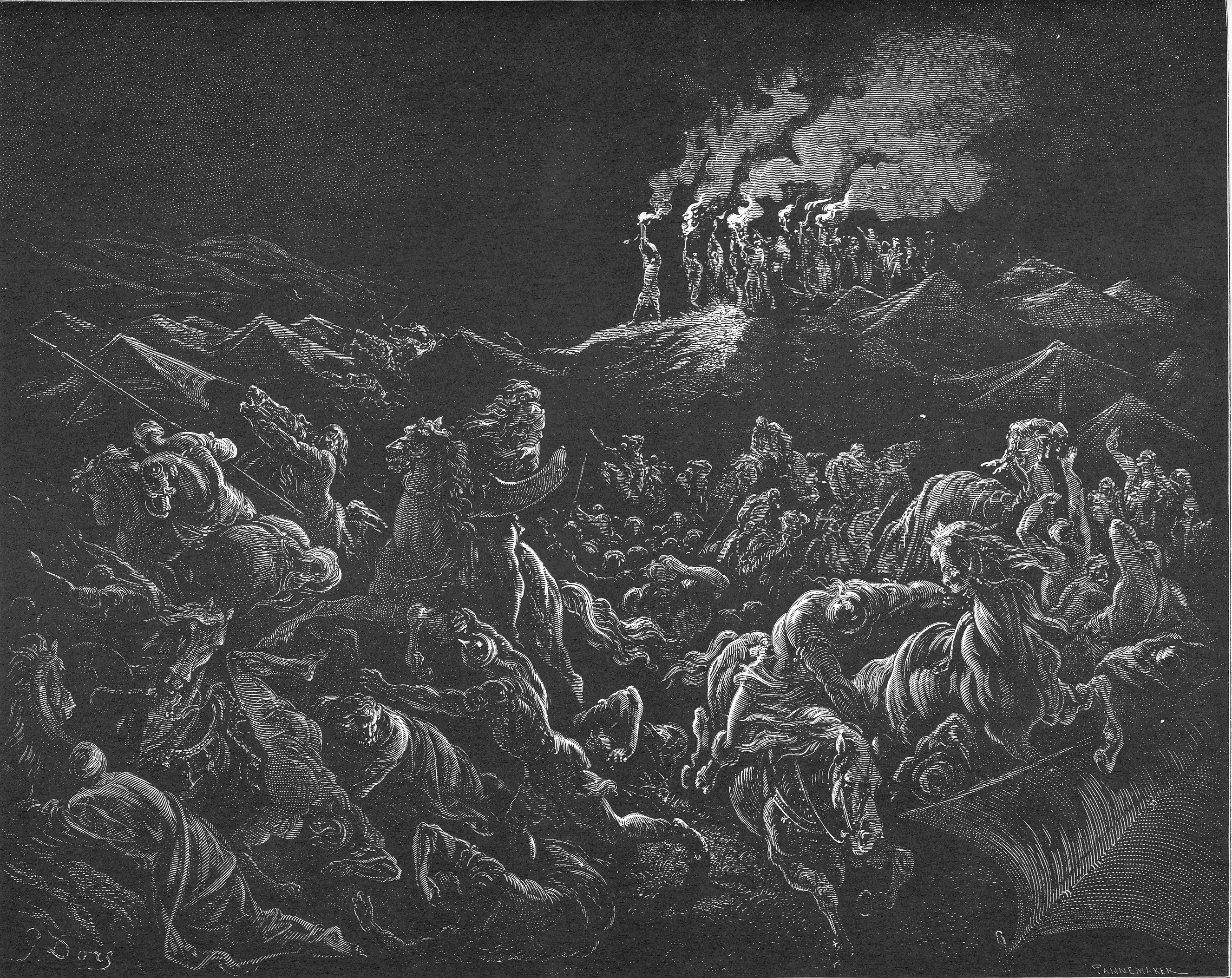
The Midianites Are Routed by Gustave Dore

=== Association with violent Jewish attitudes in the modern era ===
According to Ian Lustick, leaders of the now defunct Jewish fundamentalist movement Gush Emunim, such as Hanan Porat, considered the Palestinians to be like Canaanites or Amalekites, and suggested that the biblical texts imply a duty to make merciless war against Arabs who reject Jewish sovereignty.

Niels Peter Lemche asserts that European colonialism in the 19th century was ideologically based on the Old Testament narratives of conquest and extermination and that some radical Zionist groups have brought the same idea to bear in Israel.

Nur Masalha, Elliot Horowitz, Josef Stern and others suggest that Amalekites have come to represent an "eternally irreconcilable enemy" that wants to murder Jews, and that some Jews believe that pre-emptive violence is acceptable against such enemies; for example modern Palestinians have been identified as "Amalekites" by rabbi Israel Hess.

== Modern warfare ==
Jewish tradition permits waging war and killing in certain cases. However, the permissibility to wage war is limited and the requirement is that one always seek a just peace before waging war.

In 1992, the Israel Defense Forces drafted a Code of Conduct that combines international law, Israeli law, Jewish heritage and the IDF's own traditional ethical code—the IDF Spirit (Hebrew: רוח צה"ל, Ru'ah Tzahal).

According to Rabbi Judah Loew (Maharal) of Prague, Jewish law forbids the killing of innocent people, even in the course of a legitimate military engagement. Nonetheless, some religious leaders have interpreted Jewish religious laws to support killing of innocent civilians during wartime in some circumstances, and that this interpretation was asserted several times: in 1974 following the Yom Kippur War, in 2004, during conflicts in West Bank and Gaza, and in the 2006 Lebanon War. However, major and mainstream religious leaders have condemned this interpretation, and the Israeli military subscribes to the purity of arms doctrine, which seeks to minimize injuries to non-combatants; furthermore, the advice was only applicable to combat operations in wartime.

During the 2006 Lebanon War leaders of the Rabbinical Council of America issued a statement prodding the Israeli military to "review its policy of taking pains to spare the lives of innocent civilians", because Hezbollah "puts Israeli men and women at extraordinary risk of life and limb through unconscionably using their own civilians, hospitals, ambulances, mosques... as human shields, cannon fodder, and weapons of asymmetric warfare," the rabbinical council said in a statement, "we believe that Judaism would neither require nor permit a Jewish soldier to sacrifice himself in order to save deliberately endangered enemy civilians."

In another case, a booklet published by an IDF military chaplain stated "... insofar as the killing of civilians is performed against the background of war, one should not, according to religious law, trust a Gentile 'The best of the Gentiles you should kill'...". The booklet was withdrawn by the military after criticism, but the military never repudiated the guidance.

Activist Noam Chomsky claims that leaders of Judaism in Israel play a role in sanctioning military operations: "[Israel's Supreme Rabbinical Council] gave their endorsement to the 1982 invasion of Lebanon, declaring that it conformed to the Halachi (religious) law and that participation in the war 'in all its aspects' is a religious duty. The military Rabbinate meanwhile distributed a document to soldiers containing a map of Lebanon with the names of cities replaced by alleged Hebrew names taken from the Bible.... A military Rabbi in Lebanon explained the biblical sources that justify 'our being here and our opening the war; we do our Jewish religious duty by being here.'"

In 2007, Mordechai Eliyahu, the former Sephardi Chief Rabbi of Israel, wrote that "there was absolutely no moral prohibition against the indiscriminate killing of civilians during a potential massive military offensive on Gaza aimed at stopping the rocket launchings". His son, Shmuel Eliyahu chief rabbi of Safed, called for the "carpet bombing" of the general area from which the Kassams were launched, to stop rocket attacks on Israel, saying "This is a message to all leaders of the Jewish people not to be compassionate with those who shoot [rockets] at civilians in their houses." he continued, "If they don't stop after we kill 100, then we must kill 1,000. And if they don't stop after 1,000, then we must kill 10,000. If they still don't stop we must kill 100,000. Even a million. Whatever it takes to make them stop."

An influential Chabad Lubavitch Hassid rabbi Manis Friedman in 2009 was quoted as saying: "I don't believe in western morality, i.e. don't kill civilians or children, don't destroy holy sites, don't fight during holiday seasons, don't bomb cemeteries, don't shoot until they shoot first because it is immoral. The only way to fight a moral war is the Jewish way: Destroy their holy sites. Kill men, women and children". Later, Friedman explained: "the sub-question I chose to address instead is: how should we act in time of war, when our neighbors attack us, using their women, children and religious holy places as shields."

== See also ==
- Jewish military history
- Judaism and peace
- Judaism and violence
- Religious violence
- Christianity and violence
- Islam and violence
- Buddhism and violence
- Mormonism and violence
- Jewish ethics
- Jewish Peace Fellowship
- Jewish religious terrorism
- Zionist political violence
- Israel and state-sponsored terrorism
