= Judaism and violence =

Judaism's doctrines and texts have sometimes been associated with violence or anti-violence. Laws requiring the eradication of evil, sometimes using violent means, exist in the Jewish tradition. However, Judaism also contains peaceful texts and doctrines. There is often a juxtaposition of Judaic law and theology to violence and nonviolence by groups and individuals. Attitudes and laws towards both peace and violence exist within the Jewish tradition. Throughout history, Judaism's religious texts or precepts have been used to promote as well as oppose violence.

== Normative Judaism ==
Normative Judaism is not pacifist and violence is condoned in the service of self-defence. J. Patout Burns asserts that Jewish tradition clearly posits the principle of minimization of violence. This principle can be stated as "(wherever) Jewish law allows violence to keep an evil from occurring, it mandates that the minimal amount of violence be used to accomplish one's goal." Notwithstanding the inherent friction associated with the various Jewish religious movements in the state of Israel all vying for official recognition, in 1997 Avi Shafran of the Agudath Israel of America pushed back on assertions made by Ismar Schorsch that the State's elevation of Rabbinic Judaism as the sole arbiter over personal status issues would inevitably lead to violence. Sure enough, in a May 2022 incident which took place at the Western Wall, Orthodox Jewish seminarians waving World Zionist Organization flags, whose delegation was organized by the World Shas Movement and Eretz Hakodesh—an American affiliate of United Torah Judaism—jeered at, drowned out with whistles and spat upon members of the Women of the Wall group over religious and ideological differences.

=== Nonviolence ===
Similar to the world's other major religions, Judaism's religious texts endorse compassion and peace. The Hebrew Bible contains the well-known commandment to "love thy neighbor as thyself". According to the 1937 Columbus Platform of Reform Judaism, "Judaism, from the days of the prophets, has proclaimed to mankind the ideal of universal peace, striving for spiritual and physical disarmament of all nations. Judaism rejects violence and relies upon moral education, love and sympathy."

The philosophy of nonviolence has roots in Judaism, going back to the Jerusalem Talmud of the middle 3rd century. While absolute nonviolence is not a requirement of Judaism, the religion so sharply restricts the use of violence, that nonviolence often becomes the only way to fulfilling a life of truth, justice and peace, which Judaism considers to be the three tools for the preservation of the world.

== Warfare ==
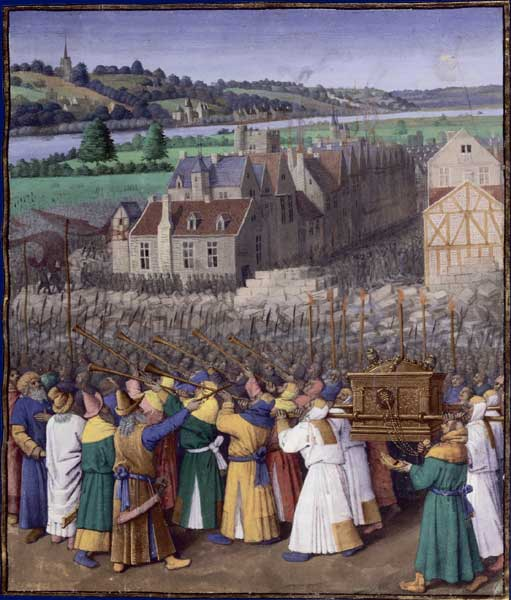
Jean Fouquet: The Taking of Jericho, c. 1452–1460

The biblical narrative about the conquest of Canaan, and the commands related to it, have had a deep influence on Jewish as well as Western culture. Throughout Jewish history, mainstream Jewish traditions have considered these texts purely historical or highly conditioned, and in any event, they are not considered relevant to later times.

The Second Temple period experienced a surge in militarism and violence which was aimed at curbing the encroachment of Greco-Roman and Hellenistic Jewish influences in Judea. Groups such as the Maccabees the Zealots, the Sicarii at the Siege of Masada, and later the Bar Kochba revolt, all derived their power from the biblical narrative of Hebrew conquest and hegemony over the Land of Israel, sometimes garnering support of the rabbis, and at other times their ambivalence.

In modern times, the early history of Zionism saw the emergence of the Brit Shalom organization (lit. 'Covenant of Peace'). Deriving inspiration from the writings of Ahad Ha'am, its members sought to prod the nascent Zionist movement into a direction of peaceful coexistence with the Arabs in Palestine in a bi-national state. These ideas eventually fell out of favor as Zionist militias employing violence began to emerge as a response to the 1921 Jaffa riots and the subsequent Israeli–Palestinian conflict. Since then, warfare which has been conducted by the State of Israel is governed by Israeli law and regulation, which includes a purity of arms code that is based in part on Jewish tradition; the 1992 IDF Code of Conduct combines international law, Israeli law, Jewish heritage and the IDF's own traditional ethical code. However, tension between actions of the Israeli government on the one hand, and Jewish traditions and halakha (Jewish law) on the conduct of war on the other, have caused controversy within Israel and have provided a basis for criticism of Israel. Some strains of radical Zionism promote aggressive war and justify them with biblical texts.

== Forced conversion ==
Forced conversions occurred under the Hasmonean kingdom. The Idumaens were forced to convert to Judaism, either by threats of exile, or threats of death, depending on the source.

In Eusebíus, Christianity, and Judaism Harold W. Attridge claims that "there is reason to think that Josephus' account of their conversion is substantially accurate." He also writes, "That these were not isolated instances but that forced conversion was a national policy is clear from the fact that Alexander Jannaeus (c. 80 BCE) demolished the city of Pella in Ammon, 'because the inhabitants would not agree to adopt the national custom of the Jews.'" Josephus, Antiquities. 13.15.4.

Maurice Sartre has written of the "policy of forced Judaization adopted by Hyrcanos, Aristobulus I and Jannaeus", who offered "the conquered peoples a choice between expulsion or conversion".

William Horbury has written that "The evidence is best explained by postulating that an existing small Jewish population in Lower Galilee was massively expanded by the forced conversion in c. 104 BCE of their Gentile neighbours in the north."

=== Kingdom of Himyar ===
After the conversion of the kingdom of Himyar in the late 4th century to Judaism, two episodes of "coercion and brutality" by Himyar Jewish kings took place during the fifth and early sixth centuries. In an early example of persecution of Christians, thirty-nine Christians were martyred in the third quarter of the fifth century, and a massacre of Christians took place in 523. The Yemeni Jewish Himyar tribe, led by King Dhu Nuwashad, offered Christian residents of a village in Arabia the choice between conversion to Judaism or death, and 20,000 Christians were massacred. Inscriptions show the great pride he expressed after massacring more than 22,000 Christians in Zafar and Najran.

== Retribution and punishments ==
=== An eye for an eye ===
While the principle of lex talionis ("an eye for an eye") is clearly echoed in the Bible, in Judaism it is not literally applied, and was interpreted to provide a basis for financial compensation for injuries. Pasachoff and Littman point to the reinterpretation of the lex talionis as an example of the ability of Pharisaic Judaism to "adapt to changing social and intellectual ideas." Stephen Wylen asserts that the lex talionis is "proof of the unique value of each individual" and that it teaches "equality of all human beings for law."

=== Capital and corporal punishment ===
While the Bible and Talmud specify many violent punishments, including death by stoning, decapitation, burning, and strangulation for some crimes, these punishments were substantially modified during the Rabbinic era, primarily by adding additional requirements for conviction. The Mishnah states that a sanhedrin that executes one person in seven years – or seventy years, according to Eleazar ben Azariah – is considered bloodthirsty. During the Late Antiquity, the tendency of not applying the death penalty at all became predominant in Jewish courts. According to Talmudic law, the competence to apply capital punishment ceased with the destruction of the Second Temple. In practice, where medieval Jewish courts had the power to pass and execute death sentences, they continued to do so for particularly grave offenses, although not necessarily the ones defined by the law. Although it was recognized that the use of capital punishment in the post-Second Temple era went beyond the biblical warrant, the Rabbis who supported it believed that it could be justified by other considerations of Jewish law. Whether Jewish communities ever practiced capital punishment according to rabbinical law and whether the Rabbis of the Talmudic era ever supported its use even in theory has been a subject of historical and ideological debate. The 12th-century Jewish legal scholar Maimonides stated that "It is better and more satisfactory to acquit a thousand guilty persons than to put a single innocent one to death." The position of Jewish Law on capital punishment often formed the basis of deliberations by Israel's Supreme Court. It has been carried out by Israel's judicial system only once, in the case of Adolf Eichmann.

== Purim and the Book of Esther ==
The Book of Esther, one of the books of the Jewish Bible, is a story of palace intrigue centered on a plot to kill all Jews which was thwarted by Esther, a Jewish queen of Persia. Instead of being victims, the Jews killed "all the people who wanted to kill them." The king gave the Jews the ability to defend themselves against their enemies who tried to kill them, numbering 75,000 (Esther 9:16) including Haman, an Amalekite that led the plot to kill the Jews. The annual Purim festival celebrates this event, and includes the recitation of the biblical instruction to "blot out the remembrance [or name] of Amalek". Scholars – including Ian Lustick, Marc Gopin, and Steven Bayme – state that the violence described in the Book of Esther has inspired and incited violent acts and violent attitudes in the post-biblical era, continuing into modern times, often centered on the festival of Purim.

Other scholars, including Jerome Auerbach, state that evidence for Jewish violence on Purim through the centuries is "exceedingly meager", including occasional episodes of stone throwing, the spilling of rancid oil on a Jewish convert, and a total of three recorded Purim deaths inflicted by Jews in a span of more than 1,000 years. In a review of historian Elliot Horowitz's book Reckless rites: Purim and the legacy of Jewish violence, Hillel Halkin pointed out that the incidences of Jewish violence against non-Jews through the centuries are extraordinarily few in number and that the connection between them and Purim is tenuous.

Rabbi Arthur Waskow and historian Elliot Horowitz state that Baruch Goldstein, perpetrator of the Cave of the Patriarchs massacre, may have been motivated by the Book of Esther, because the massacre was carried out on the day of Purim but other scholars point out that the association with Purim is circumstantial because Goldstein never explicitly made such a connection.

== Modern acts of religiously motivated violence ==
=== Cases ===
In the context of the Israeli–Palestinian conflict, the motives for acts of violence which have been committed against Palestinians by Religious Jews in the West Bank are complex and varied according to Weisburg. While religious motivations for these acts of violence have been documented, the use of non-defensive violence is outside of mainstream Judaism.

Abraham Isaac Kook (1865–1935), the Ashkenazi Chief Rabbi of Mandate Palestine, stated that the Jewish people's settlement of the land should only proceed by peaceful means. Contemporary settler movements follow Kook's son Tzvi Yehuda Kook (1891–1982), who also refused to advocate an aggressive conquest of the Land of Israel. Critics claim that Gush Emunim and followers of Tzvi Yehuda Kook advocate violence based on Judaism's religious precepts. Ian Lustick, Benny Morris, and Nur Masalha assert that radical Zionist leaders relied on religious doctrines for justification for the violent treatment of Arabs in Palestine, citing examples where pre-state Jewish militia used verses from the Bible to justify their violent acts, which included expulsions and massacres such as the one at Deir Yassin.

After Baruch Goldstein carried out the Cave of the Patriarchs massacre in 1994, his actions were widely interpreted as being based on the radical Zionist ideology of the Kach movement, and they were condemned as such by mainstream religious and secular Jews but they were praised by a number of radical Zionists. Dov Lior, Chief Rabbi of Hebron and Kiryat Arba in the southern West Bank and head of the "Council of Rabbis of Judea and Samaria" has made speeches legitimizing the killing of non-Jews and praising Goldstein as a saint and martyr. Lior also said "a thousand non-Jewish lives are not worth a Jew's fingernail" according to journalists. Lior publicly gave permission to spill blood of Arab persons and has publicly supported extreme right-wing terrorists of Jewish faith.

Following an arson incident in 2010, in which a mosque in Yasuf village was desecrated, apparently by settlers from the nearby Gush Etzion settlement bloc, the Chief Ashkenazi Rabbi Yona Metzger condemned the attack and he also likened the arson to Kristallnacht, he said: "This is how the Holocaust began, the tragedy of the Jewish people of Europe." Rabbi Menachem Froman, a well-known peace activist, visited the mosque and replaced the burnt Koran with new copies. The rabbi stated: "This visit is to say that although there are people who oppose peace, he who opposes peace is opposed to God" and "Jewish law also prohibits damaging a holy place." He also remarked that arson in a mosque is an attempt to sow hatred between Jews and Arabs.

According to Haaretz, in July 2010, Yitzhak Shapira who heads Dorshei Yihudcha yeshiva in the West Bank settlement of Yitzhar, was arrested by Israeli police based on suspicion that he had written a book that encourages Jews to kill non-Jews. The book, The King's Torah, (Torat HaMelech) claims that, under the Torah and Jewish Law, the killing of Gentiles is legal and in some cases, the killing of the babies of enemies is also legal. Later in August 2010, police arrested rabbi Yosef Elitzur-Hershkowitz – co-author of Shapira's book – on the suspicion of incitement to racial violence, possession of a racist text, and possession of material that incites to violence. While the book has been endorsed by radical Zionist leaders including Dov Lior and Yaakov Yosef, it has been widely condemned by mainstream secular and religious Jews. Rabbi Hayim David HaLevi stated that in modern times no one matches the biblical definition of an idolater, and therefore ruled that Jews in Israel have a moral responsibility to treat all citizens with the highest standards of humanity.

==== Assassinations ====
On November 7, 1938, a young Polish Jew named Herschel Grynszpan attacked and shot German diplomat Ernst vom Rath in the German embassy in Paris five times, mortally wounding him with bullets to the spleen, stomach and pancreas. The attack occurred against the backdrop of the racial policy of Nazi Germany, which led to Grynszpan's family, together with more than 12,000 Polish-born Jews, being expelled by the Nazi government from Germany to Poland in the so-called Polenaktion on October 28, 1938. Grynszpan, trying to pass himself off as a spy, asked if he could see "His Excellency, the ambassador" to hand over the "most important document" he claimed to have. Instead, according to the French police account, he shouted right before pulling out his gun: "You're a filthy boche! In the name of 12,000 persecuted Jews, here is the document!" At his trial, Grynszpan wanted to use the "Jewish avenger" defense successfully used by Sholem Schwarzbard at his trial in 1927, but Grynszpan's French lawyer Vincent de Moro-Giafferi pursued a defense based on Rath being a homosexual who tried to seduce Grynszpan, an approach which succeeded in delaying the trial indefinitely. Jewish organizations were horrified by Grynszpan's action. The World Jewish Congress "deplored the fatal shooting of an official of the German Embassy by a young Polish Jew of seventeen", but "protested energetically against the violent attacks in the German press against the whole of Judaism because of this act" and "reprisals taken against the German Jews". In France, the Alliance Israélite Universelle "rejected all forms of violence, regardless of author or victim" but "indignantly protested against the barbarous treatment inflicted on an entire innocent population."

The assassination of Israeli Prime Minister Yitzhak Rabin by Yigal Amir was motivated by Amir's personal political views and his understanding of Judaism's religious law of moiser (the duty to eliminate a Jew who intends to turn another Jew over to non-Jewish authorities, thus putting a Jew's life in danger) and rodef (a bystander can kill a person who is pursuing another person in an attempt to murder him or her if he or she cannot be stopped in other ways). Amir's interpretation has been described as "a gross distortion of Jewish law and tradition" and the mainstream Jewish view is that Rabin's assassin had no Halakhic basis to shoot Prime Minister Rabin.

=== Extremist organizations ===
In the course of Jewish history, many individuals and organizations have endorsed or advocated extreme violence based on their interpretations of Jewish religious principles. Such instances of religious violence may be considered extremist aberrations of Judaism by adherents of mainstream Judaism, and as a result, they are not considered representative of the tenets of Judaism.

- Kach (defunct) and Kahane Chai
- Gush Emunim Underground (defunct): formed by members of Gush Emunim.
- Brit HaKanaim (defunct): an organisation operating in Israel from 1950 to 1953 with the objective of imposing Jewish religious law in the country and establishing a Halakhic state.
- The Jewish Defense League (JDL): founded in 1969 by Rabbi Meir Kahane in New York City, with the declared purpose of protecting Jews from harassment and antisemitism. FBI statistics show that, from 1980 to 1985, 15 terrorist attacks were attempted in the U.S. by members of the JDL. The FBI's Mary Doran described the JDL in 2004 Congressional testimony as "a proscribed terrorist group". The National Consortium for the Study of Terror and Responses to Terrorism states that, during the JDL's first two decades of activity, it was an "active terrorist organization". Kahanist groups are banned in Israel.

== General claims ==
Some critics of religion such as Jack Nelson-Pallmeyer argue that all monotheistic religions are inherently violent. For example, Nelson-Pallmeyer writes that "Judaism, Christianity and Islam will continue to contribute to the destruction of the world until and unless each challenges violence in 'sacred texts' and until each affirms nonviolent, including the nonviolent power of God."

Bruce Feiler writes of ancient history that "Jews and Christians who smugly console themselves that Islam is the only violent religion are willfully ignoring their past. Nowhere is the struggle between faith and violence described more vividly, and with more stomach-turning details of ruthlessness, than in the Hebrew Bible". Similarly, Burggraeve and Vervenne describe the Old Testament as full of violence and evidence of both a violent society and a violent god. They write that, "[i]n numerous Old Testament texts the power and glory of Israel's God is described in the language of violence." They assert that more than one thousand passages refer to YHWH as acting violently or supporting the violence of humans and that more than one hundred passages involve divine commands to kill humans.

Supersessionist Christian churches and theologians argue that Judaism is a violent religion and they also argue that the god of Israel is a violent god, while Christianity is a religion of peace and they also argue that the god of Christianity is one that only expresses love. While this point of view has been commonly held throughout the history of Christianity and while it currently remains a common assumption among contemporary Christians, it has been rejected by mainstream Christian theologians and denominations since the Holocaust.

== See also ==
- Anti-Zionism
  - Far-right politics in Israel
  - Timeline of anti-Zionism
  - Zionism as settler colonialism
  - Zionist political violence
- Sectarian violence
  - Sectarian violence among Christians
  - Sectarian violence among Muslims
- Israel and state-sponsored terrorism
- Israeli settler violence
- Jewish fundamentalism
- Jewish terrorism

== Sources ==
- Berger, Michael S., "Taming the Beast: Rabbinic Pacification of Second-Century Jewish Nationalism", in Belief and bloodshed: religion and violence across time and tradition, James K. Wellman (Ed.), Rowman & Littlefield, 2007, pp. 47–62
- Boustan, Ra'anan S., "Violence, Scripture, and Textual Practice in Early Judaism and Christianity", in Violence, Scripture, and Textual Practice in Early Judaism and Christianity, Ra'anan S. Boustan, Alex P. Jassen, Calvin J. Roetzel (Eds), Brill, 2010 pp. 1–12
- Bowersock, G. W. (2013), The Throne of Adulis: Red Sea Wars of the Eve of Islam, Oxford University Press
- Chilton, Bruce, Abraham's Curse: The Roots of Violence in Judaism, Christianity, and Islam, Doubleday, 2009
- Chomsky, Noam, World orders, old and new, Columbia University Press, 1996
- Ehrlich, Carl. S, "Joshua, Judaism, and Genocide", in Jewish Studies at the Turn of the Twentieth Century, Judit Targarona Borrás, Ángel Sáenz-Badillos (Eds). 1999, Brill. pp. 117–124.
- Ellens, J. Harold (Ed.), The destructive power of religion: violence in Judaism, Christianity, and Islam, Greenwood Publishing Group, 2007
- Esber, Rosemarie M., Under the Cover of War: The Zionist Expulsion of the Palestinians, Arabicus Books & Media, LLC, 2009
- Feldman, Louis H., "Remember Amalek!": vengeance, zealotry, and group destruction in the Bible according to Philo, Pseudo-Philo, and Josephus, Hebrew Union College Press, 2004
- Firestone, Reuven, "Judaism on Violence and Reconciliation: An Examination of Key Sources", in Beyond violence: religious sources of social transformation in Judaism, Christianity, and Islam, James Heft (Ed.), Fordham Univ Press, 2004, pp. 74–87
- Glick, Leonard B., "Religion and Genocide", in The Widening circle of genocide, Alan L. Berger (Ed). Transaction Publishers, 1994, pp. 43–74
- Gopin, Marc, Between Eden and Armageddon: the future of world religions, violence, and peacemaking, Oxford University Press US, 2000.
- Harkabi, Yehoshafat, Arab attitudes to Israel, John Wiley and Sons, 1974
- Heft, James (Ed.), Beyond violence: religious sources of social transformation in Judaism, Christianity, and Islam, Fordham Univ Press, 2004
- Hirst, David, The gun and the olive branch: the roots of violence in the Middle East, Nation Books, 2003
- Hoffman, R. Joseph, The just war and jihad: violence in Judaism, Christianity, and Islam, Prometheus Books, 2006
- Horowitz, Elliott S., Reckless rites: Purim and the legacy of Jewish violence, Princeton University Press, 2006
- Jacobs, Steven Leonard, "The Last Uncomfortable Religious Question? Monotheistic Exclusivism and Textual Superiority in Judaism, Christianity, and Islam as Sources of Hate and Genocide", in Confronting genocide: Judaism, Christianity, Islam, Steven L. Jacobs (Ed.), Lexington Books, 2009, pp. 35–46
- Johnson, Paul, A History of the Jews, Harper Perennial, 1987
- Juergensmeyer, Mark, Terror in the mind of God: the global rise of religious violence, University of California Press, 2003
- Kuper, Leo, "Theological Warrants for Genocide: Judaism, Islam, and Christianity", in Confronting genocide: Judaism, Christianity, Islam, Steven L. Jacobs (Ed.), Lexington Books, 2009, pp. 3–34
- Lustick, Ian, For the land and the Lord: Jewish fundamentalism in Israel, Council on Foreign Relations, 1988
- Masalha, Nur, The Bible and Zionism: Invented Traditions, Archaeology and Post-colonialism in Palestine-Israel, Zed Books, 2007
- Morris, Benny, The birth of the Palestinian refugee problem revisited, Cambridge University Press, 2004
- Niditch, Susan, War in the Hebrew Bible: a study in the ethics of violence, Oxford University Press US, 1995
- Pappe, Ilan, The ethnic cleansing of Palestine, Oneworld, 2007
- Pedahzur, Ami, Jewish terrorism in Israel, Columbia University Press, Columbia University Press, 2009
- Perliger, Arie and Weinberg, Leonard, "Jewish Self-Defence and Terrorist Groups Prior to the Establishment of the State of Israel: Roots and Traditions", in Religious fundamentalism and political extremism, Perliger, Arie (Ed.), Taylor & Francis, 2004, pp. 91–118
- Phillips, Gary A., "More Than the Jews … His Blood Be Upon All the Children: Biblical Violence, Genocide and Responsible Reading", in Confronting genocide: Judaism, Christianity, Islam, Steven L. Jacobs (Ed.), Lexington Books, 2009, pp. 77–87
- Pitkanen, Pekka, "Memory, Witnesses, and Genocide in the Book of Joshua", in Reading the law: studies in honour of Gordon J. Wenham, J. Gordon McConville, Karl Möller (Eds), Continuum International Publishing Group, 2007, pp. 267–282
- Prior, Michael P., The Bible and colonialism: a moral critique, Sheffield Academic Press, 1997.
- Quigley, John B., Palestine and Israel: a challenge to justice, Duke University Press, 1990
- Saleh Abd al-Jawad (2007) "Zionist Massacres: the Creation of the Palestinian Refugee Problem in the 1948 War" in Israel and the Palestinian refugees, Eyal Benvenistî, Chaim Gans, Sari Hanafi (Eds.), Springer, 2007
- Schwab, Gerald, The Day the Holocaust Began, Praeger, New York, 1990 ISBN 9780275935764
- Selengut, Charles, Sacred fury: understanding religious violence, Rowman & Littlefield, 2008
- Shahak, Israel, Jewish fundamentalism in Israel, Pluto Press, 1999
- Sprinzak, Ehud, Brother against brother: violence and extremism in Israeli politics from Altalena to the Rabin assassination, Simon and Schuster, 1999
- Van Wees, Hans, "Genocide in the Ancient World", in The Oxford Handbook of Genocide Studies, Donald Bloxham, A. Dirk Moses (Eds), Oxford University Press US, 2010, pp. 239–258.
- Weisburd, David, Jewish Settler Violence, Penn State Press, 1985
- Whitelam, Keith W., The invention of ancient Israel: the silencing of Palestinian history, Routledge, 1996
