= Seven Nations (Bible) =

Peoples described in the Hebrew Bible

The Seven Nations (Hebrew: שבעת העמים, romanized: Shivat Ha'amim) are seven nations that according to the Hebrew Bible lived in the Land of Canaan prior to the return of the Israelites.

God instructed the Israelites to destroy these seven nations upon entering Canaan. The meaning and implications of these verses in historical contexts was discussed in later commentary.

The seven nations are all descendants of Canaan, son of Ham and grandson of Noah, from whom they derive their collective name Canaanites. When enumerated separately, one of the seven nations is called Canaanites, while the others are called the Amorites, the Girgashites, the Hittites, the Hivites, the Jebusites and the Perizzites.

Brian R. Doak argues that the seven nations embody the "symbol(s) of the religious practices Israel should avoid". Membership in these nations is also not strictly determined by biological descent in Christian thought. Rather, it was determined by whether one lived in their lands and emulated their customs. For example, pagan Israelites were frequently derided as Canaanites by monotheistic Jews.
