= Judaism and peace =

Judaism has teachings and guidance for its adherents through the Hebrew Bible and rabbinic literature relating to the notion and concept of peace. The precepts of peacefulness and compassion are paramount in Judaism, Judaism also contains a number of doctrines which eschew violence. However, while Judaism condemns normative violence, it is not categorically pacifist.

== Jewish texts ==
=== Tanakh ===
Judaism's religious texts overwhelmingly endorse compassion and peace, and the Hebrew Bible contains the well-known commandment to "love thy neighbor as thyself".

In fact, the love of peace and the pursuit of peace is one of the key principles in Jewish law. While Jewish tradition permits waging war and killing in certain cases, however, the requirement is that one always seek a just peace before waging war.

According to the 1937 Columbus Platform of Reform Judaism, "Judaism, from the days of the prophets, has proclaimed to mankind the ideal of universal peace, striving for spiritual and physical disarmament of all nations. Judaism rejects violence and relies upon moral education, love and sympathy."

The Torah, Tanakh and its related literature write extensively concerning peace, as well as its opposite states. The word "shalom" meaning "peace" has been absorbed into the usage of the language from its Biblical roots and from there to many of the world's languages, religions and cultures as prized idioms and well-worn expressions. A New Concordance of the Bible: Thesaurus of the Language of the Bible lists over almost 300 words connected with the root "SH-L-M" for "peace".

The Jews are the mildest of men, passionately hostile to violence. That obstinate sweetness which they conserve in the midst of the most atrocious persecution, that sense of justice and of reason which they put up as their sole defense against a hostile, brutal, and unjust society, is perhaps the best part of the message they bring to us and the true mark of their greatness.

— Jean-Paul Sartre

Notable examples:

- The Priestly Blessing (Numbers 6:24–26) ends with: "May God lift up his face onto you and give you peace" – יִשָּׂא יְהוָה פָּנָיו אֵלֶיךָ, וְיָשֵׂם לְךָ שָלוֹם
- Leviticus 26:6: "And I shall place peace upon the land" וְנָתַתִּי שָלוֹם בָּאָרֶץ
- Numbers 25:12: "Behold I give him my covenant of peace" - הִנְנִי נֹתֵן לוֹ אֶת-בְּרִיתִי, שָלוֹם
- Isaiah 57:19: "Peace, peace to the distant and the close" - שָלוֹם שָלוֹם לָרָחוֹק וְלַקָּרוֹב
- Psalms 34:15: "Seek peace and pursue it" - בַּקֵּשׁ שָלוֹם וְרָדְפֵהוּ
- Psalms 119:165: "Great peace to those who love Your Torah" - שָלוֹם רָב, לְאֹהֲבֵי תוֹרָתֶךָ
- Psalms 125:5 and Psalms 128:6: "Peace upon Israel" - שָׁלוֹם, עַל-יִשְׂרָאֵל

==== Torah ====
peace is one of the underlying principles of the Torah, Proverbs 3:17"Her ways are pleasant ways and all her paths are shalom ('peace')." The Talmud explains, "The entire Torah is for the sake of the ways of shalom". Maimonides comments in his Mishneh Torah: "Great is peace, as the whole Torah was given in order to promote peace in the world, as it is stated, 'Her ways are pleasant ways and all her paths are peace.'"

When Moses saw a Hebrew striking another in Egypt (Exodus 2:13): "...he said to the rasha ("evil one"), why do you hit your fellow!?". The midrash comments, "Rabbi Yitzhak said: from this you learn that whoever hits his fellow, is called a rasha." Maimonides ruled that whoever strikes his fellow transgresses a negative commandment. When the time for war arrived, Jewish soldiers are expected to abide by specific laws and values when fighting. Jewish war ethics attempts to balance the value of maintaining human life with the necessity of fighting a war. Judaism is somewhat unusual in that it demands adherence to Jewish values even while fighting a war. The Torah provides the following rules for how to fight a war:

1. Pursue Peace Before Waging War.
2. Preserve the Ecological Needs of the Environment.
3. Maintain Sensitivity to Human Life.
4. The Goal is Peace.

According to Deuteronomy, an offer of peace is to be made to any city which is besieged, conditional on the acceptance of terms of tribute.

=== Mishna ===
In the Mishna, Rabbi Shimon ben Gamliel taught: "The world rests on three things: justice, truth, and peace." The Mishna sages further asked, who is a hero of heroes? They answered, not one who defeats his enemy but one who turns an enemy into a friend.

=== Hebrew etymologies ===
==== Shalom ====
The Hebrew word for peace is shalom which is derived from one of the names of God. Hebrew root word for "complete" or "whole" implying that according to Judaism and the teachings of the Torah, only when there is a true state of "wholeness" meaning that everything is "complete" does true "peace" reign, making it a cognate to the Arabic word Salaam.

Shin-Lamedh-Mem (Arabic: س ل م S-L-M; Imperial Aramaic: ܫܠܡܐ; Hebrew: שלם Š-L-M; Maltese: S-L-M) is the triconsonantal root of many Semitic words, and many of those words are used as names. The root itself, S-L-M, translates as "whole, safe, intact".

==== Place names ====
The name of the city of Jerusalem, Yerushalayim in Hebrew is said to be made up of two words with "-shalayim" i.e. "-salem" denoting the concept of "peace", with "Yeru-" i.e. "Jeru-" denoting "fear [of God]" as a combined word. This Midrashic explanation of the name relates it to the yir'eh from the name Adonai-yir'eh ("The Lord sees", Vulgate Latin Dominus videt) given to Moriah by Abraham and the name Salem. Other midrashim say that Jerusalem means "City of Peace".

==== Given names ====
The names of biblical figures such as Solomon and Salome refer to peace

== In prayer ==
List of Jewish prayers and blessings are replete with constant references for a longing for peace on Earth and its attendant blessings.

=== Messianic Age ===
Judaism is the source-religion for the notion of a Messianic Age, a theological term referring to a future time of universal peace and brotherhood on the earth, without crime, war and poverty. Many religions have come to believe and await such an age; some refer to it as the "Kingdom of God".

According to Jewish tradition, the Messianic Era will be one of global peace and harmony, an era free of strife and hardship, and one conducive to the furtherance of the knowledge of the Creator. The theme of the Jewish Messiah ushering in an era of global peace is encapsulated in two of the most famous scriptural passages from the Book of Isaiah from the verses: Isaiah 2:4 and Isaiah 11:6–9:

They shall beat their swords into plowshares and their spears into pruning hooks; nation will not lift sword against nation and they will no longer study warfare. (Isaiah 2:4)

The wolf will live with the lamb, the leopard will lie down with the goat, the calf and the lion and the yearling together; and a little child will lead them. The cow will feed with the bear, their young will lie down together, and the lion will eat straw like the ox. The infant will play near the hole of the cobra, and the young child put his hand into the viper's nest. They will neither harm nor destroy on all my holy mountain, for the earth will be full of the knowledge of the Lord as the waters cover the sea. (Isaiah 11:6-9)

== Opposition to Violence ==
The philosophy of nonviolence has roots in Judaism, going back to the Jerusalem Talmud of the middle third century. While absolute nonviolence is not a requirement of Judaism, the religion so sharply restricts the use of violence, that nonviolence often becomes the only way to fulfilling a life of truth, justice and peace, which Judaism considers to be the three tools for the preservation of the world.

Jewish law (past and present) does not permit any use of violence unless it is in self-defense. Any person that even raises his hand in order to hit another person is called "evil."

=== Avoidance of violence ===
The ancient orders (like those) of wars for Israel to eradicate idol worshiping does not apply today. Jews are not taught to glorify violence. The rabbis of the Talmud saw war as an avoidable evil. They taught: "The sword comes to the world because of delay of justice and through perversion of justice."

Jews often detested war and "Shalom" expresses the hope for peace, in Judaism war is evil, but at times a necessary evil, yet, Judaism teaches that one has to go to great length to avoid it.

=== In the Talmud ===
According to Talmudic teaching, the very fact of taking someone's life, even when justly doing so, it effects, nevertheless the person, as the Talmud regards even a justly court that did order (in ancient times) the death penalty justifiably, that particular court at that time was labeled "killer court" in shame. and even King David, regarded by Jewish tradition as the most pious righteous person, (and his wars were within God's permission or/and orders) was denied building the Jewish Temple, the Talmud explains that when King David asked "Why can I not build the Bais Hamikdash?" God's answer was: "Your hands have spilled blood (in all your many wars)."

The Talmud also teaches: "Be of the persecuted rather than the persecutor".

=== Modern scholars ===
Medieval Jewish commentators including the Spanish theologian and commentator Isaac Arama (c. 1420–1494), and Isaac Abravanel (1437–1508), emphasized the commitment of Judaism to peace.

According to sixteenth century Rabbi Judah Loew of Prague, Jewish law forbids the killing of innocent people, even in the course of a legitimate military engagement.

The Italian rabbi Samuel David Luzzatto (1800–1865) stated categorically that the only permissible war was defensive. Later, a similar position prohibiting offensive war was taken by Rabbi Yeshayahu Karelitz (the Hazon Ish, 1878–1953).

Rabbi Moshe Avigdor Amiel (1883–1946), who was the Chief Rabbi of Tel Aviv, wrote that military restraint was an absolute demand of Torah law, for "Thou shalt not murder" applied irrespective of whether the victim was Arab or Jew, and was the basis of Jewish ethics.

Israeli Chief Rabbi Shlomo Goren, who had served in the Israel Defense Forces as both paratrooper and chief chaplain, was instrumental in the formulation of the IDF official doctrine of ethics, and the concept of Purity of arms. He wrote:

"Human life is undoubtedly a supreme value in Judaism, as expressed both in the Halacha and the prophetic ethic. This refers not only to Jews, but to all men created in the image of God."

=== Violent tactics forbidden by Halakhah ===
Jewish law prohibits the use of outright vandalism in warfare. It forbids destruction of fruit trees as a tactic of war. It is also forbidden to break vessels, tear clothing, wreck that which is built up, stop fountains, or waste food in a destructive manner. Killing an animal needlessly or offering poisoned water to livestock are also forbidden.

Those few cases in the Bible in which this norm was violated are special cases. One example was when King Hezekiah stopped all the fountains in Jerusalem in the war against Sennacherib, which Jewish scholars regards as a violation of the Biblical commandment.

According to Maimonides, on besieging a city in order to seize it, it must not be surrounded on all four sides but only on three sides, thus leaving a path of escape for whoever wishes to flee to save their life. Nachmanides, writing a century later, strengthened the rule and added a reason: "We are to learn to deal kindly with our enemy."

== In the Arab-Israeli Conflict ==
Despite controversial public comments, Ovadia Yosef, an influential Sephardic rabbi and distinguished rabbinical authority, advocates for peace negotiations in the Israeli–Palestinian conflict since the late 1980s. His main justification is the halakhic principle of Pikuach Nefesh, in which all the Jewish commandments (excluding adultery, idolatry, and murder) are put on hold if a life is put in danger. Using an argument first articulated by the late American rabbinical leader Joseph Soloveitchik, Rabbi Yosef claims that the Arab–Israeli conflict endangers human lives, thereby meeting the above criteria and overruling the priority of commandments pertaining to settling the land of Israel. Therefore, Israel is permitted—even obligated if saving lives is a definitive outcome—to make serious efforts to reach a peace settlement as well as to make arrangements to properly protect its citizens. Rabbi Yosef first applied the Pikuach Nefesh principle to Israel's conflicts with its neighbors in 1979, when he ruled that this argument granted Israel authority to return the Sinai Peninsula to Egypt.

== See also ==
- Jewish eschatology
- Judaism and warfare
- Judaism and violence
- Religion and peacebuilding
