= Religious violence =

Violence practiced in the name of religion

Religious violence covers phenomena in which religion is either the target or the perpetrator of violent behavior. All of the religions of the world contain narratives, symbols, and metaphors of violence and war and also nonviolence and peacemaking. Religious violence is violence that is motivated by, or in reaction to, religious precepts, texts, or the doctrines of a target or an attacker. It includes violence against religious institutions, people, objects, or events. Religious violence includes both acts which are committed by religious groups and acts which are committed against religious groups.

The term “religious violence” has been difficult to define. Violence is a very broad concept, because it is used against both human and non-human entities. Furthermore, violence can range from bloodshed and physical harm to violation of personal freedoms, passionate conduct or language, or emotional outbursts like fury or passion. Adding to the difficulty, religion is a complex and modern Western concept, one whose definition still has no scholarly consensus.

Religious violence, like all forms of violence, is a cultural process which is context-dependent and extremely complex. Thus, oversimplifications of religion and violence often lead to misguided understandings of the causes for acts of violence, as well as oversight of their rarity. Violence is perpetrated for a wide variety of ideological reasons, and religion is generally only one of many contributing social and political factors that may foment it. For example, studies of supposed cases of religious violence often conclude that the violence was driven more by ethnic animosities than by religious worldviews. Historical circumstances in conflicts often are not linear, but socially and politically complex. Due to the complex nature of conflict, it is often difficult to discern whether religion is a significant cause of violence from all other factors. Yet instances of violence unrelated to religion are common in history.

Indeed, the link between religious belief and behavior is not linear. Decades of anthropological, sociological, and psychological research have all concluded that behaviors do not directly follow from religious beliefs and values because people's religious ideas tend to be fragmented, loosely connected, and context-dependent, just like other domains of culture and life.

== History of the concept of religion ==
Ancient sacred texts like the Bible and the Quran did not have a concept of religion in their original languages, nor did their authors or the cultures to which they belonged. Likewise, there is no precise equivalent of "religion" in ancient Hebrew and Judaism does not draw clear distinctions between religious, national, racial, or ethnic identities.

The social construct "religion" is a modern Western concept not used before the 1500s when the compartmentalized concept of religion arose, where religious entities are considered separate from worldly ones. Furthermore, parallel concepts are not found in many cultures, and there is no equivalent term for "religion" in many languages. The modern concept of religion as an abstraction that entails distinct sets of beliefs or doctrines is a recent invention in the English language. Such usage began with texts from the 17th century due to the splitting of Christendom during the Protestant Reformation, as well as more prevalent colonization and globalization in the age of exploration which involved contact with numerous foreign and indigenous cultures and non-European languages. For example, in Asia, it was Europeans who first applied the terms "Buddhism", "Hinduism", "Taoism", and "Confucianism" in the 19th century.

Thus, scholars have found it difficult to develop a consistent definition of religion, with some giving up on the possibility of a definition and others rejecting the term entirely. Still others argue that, regardless of its definition, it is not appropriate to apply it to non-Western cultures.

== Definition of violence ==
Violence is a complicated concept which broadly carries descriptive and evaluative components that range from harming non-human entities to human self-harm. Religious scholar Ralph Tanner cites the definition of violence in the Oxford English Dictionary as "far beyond [the infliction of] pain and the shedding of blood". He argues that, although violence clearly encompasses injury to persons or property, it also includes, "the forcible interference in personal freedom, violent or passionate conduct or language [and] finally passion or fury".

Similarly, a study of the Crusades' impacts on the Muslim world concludes:

The word "violence" can be defined to extend far beyond pain and shedding blood. It carries the meaning of physical force, violent language, fury, and, more importantly, forcible interference.

Old Testament scholar Terence Fretheim expands on this, writing:

For many people, ... only physical violence truly qualifies as violence. But, certainly, violence is more than killing people, unless one includes all those words and actions that kill people slowly. The effect of limitation to a "killing fields" perspective is the widespread neglect of many other forms of violence. We must insist that violence also refers to that which is psychologically destructive, that which demeans, damages, or depersonalizes others. In view of these considerations, violence may be defined as follows: any action, verbal or nonverbal, oral or written, physical or psychical, active or passive, public or private, individual or institutional/societal, human or divine, in whatever degree of intensity, that abuses, violates, injures, or kills. Some of the most pervasive and most dangerous forms of violence are those that are often hidden from view (against women and children, especially); just beneath the surface in many of our homes, churches, and communities is abuse enough to freeze the blood. Moreover, many forms of systemic violence often slip past our attention because they are so much a part of the infrastructure of life (e.g., racism, sexism, ageism).

Non-physical abuse in religious settings is described as religious abuse. Religious abuse may also include the misuse of religion for selfish, secular, or ideological ends, such as the abuse of a clerical position.

== Relationship between religion and violence ==
According to philosopher of religion Steve Clarke, "currently available evidence does not allow us to determine whether religion is, or is not, a significant cause of violence". He lists multiple problems that make it impossible to establish a causal relationship, such as difficulties in distinguishing motive/pretext and inability to verify if they would necessarily lead to any violent action, the lack of consensus on definitions of both violence and religion among scholars, and the inability to see if the presence of religion actually adds or subtracts from general levels of violence, since no society without religion has ever existed to compare with.

In his book Sacred Fury: Understanding Religious Violence, religious sociologist Charles Selengut characterizes the phrase "religion and violence" as "jarring", asserting that "religion is thought to be opposed to violence and a force for peace and reconciliation". He acknowledges, however, that "the history and scriptures of the world's religions tell stories of violence and war even as they speak of peace and love". Similarly, religious scholar Ralph Tanner describes the combination of religion and violence as "uncomfortable", asserting that religious thinkers generally avoid the conjunction of the two and argue that religious violence is "only valid in certain circumstances which are invariably one-sided".

According to historian Matthew Rowley, scholars have discussed 300 contributing causes of religious violence. In his study of causes of religious violence, though, he cautions that "violence in the name of God is a complex phenomenon and oversimplification further jeopardizes peace because it obscures many of the causal factors". In another article, Rowley lists 15 ways to address the complexity of violence, both secular and religious, and he also claims that secular narratives of religious violence tend to be erroneous or exaggerated due to their oversimplification of religious people and religious people's beliefs, their rationale based on false dichotomies, and their ignorance of complex secular causes of supposed "religious violence". He writes that when one is discussing religious violence, they should also note that the overwhelming majority of religious people do not get inspired to engage in violence.

In contrast, religious scholar Hector Avalos simplifies religious causes of violence to access over four scarce resources: divine will and knowledge, primarily through scripture; sacred space; group privileging; and salvation. Not all religions have or use these four resources. He believes that religious violence is particularly untenable because these resources are never verifiable, and, unlike claims to scarce physical resources like water or land, they cannot be adjudicated objectively.

Regina Schwartz, scholar of English literature, Judaism, and Christianity, argues that all monotheistic religions are inherently violent because of an exclusivism that inevitably fosters violence against those who are considered outsiders. In a review of her book Curse of Cain for The New Yorker, Lawrence Weschler asserts that Schwartz is concerned not just with the violent legacy of Abrahamic religions, but with their genocidal legacy as well.

Michael Jerryson, scholar of comparative religion and religious violence, argues that scholarship on religion and violence sometimes overlooks non-Abrahamic religions. This tendency leads to considerable problems, one of which is the support of faulty associations. For example, he finds a persistent global pattern of alignment in which religions such as Islam are seen as causes of violence, while religions such as Buddhism are seen as causes of peace.

Another lens with which to view religious violence is through political violence, in which religion can often play a central role. This is especially true of terrorism, in which acts of violence are committed against unarmed non-combatants in order to inspire fear and achieve political goals. Terrorism expert Martha Crenshaw suggests that religion is a mask used by political movements that seek to draw attention to their causes and gain support. Crenshaw outlines two approaches to observing religious violence to grasp its underlying mechanisms. One approach, called the instrumental approach, sees religious violence as acting as a rational calculation to achieve some political end. Thus, she claims that increasing the costs of performing such violence will help curb it. Crenshaw's other approach sees religious violence as stemming from the organizational structure of religious communities, with the heads of these communities acting as political figureheads. Crenshaw suggests that threatening the internal stability of these organizations (perhaps by offering them a nonviolent alternative) will dissuade religious organizations from performing political violence. A third approach sees religious violence as the result of community dynamics rather than a religious duty. Systems of meanings, which are developed within these communities, allow religious interpretations to justify violence, so acts like terrorism occur because people are part of communities of violence. In this way, religious violence and terrorism are performances which are designed to inspire an emotional reaction from both those in the community and those outside of it.

While religion can be used as a means of rallying support for violence, religious leaders regularly denounce such manipulations as contrary to the teachings of their belief.

=== Relationship between religion and domestic violence ===
There is controversy regarding the influence of religion on domestic violence. Judaism, Christianity and Islam have traditionally supported male-dominant households and "socially sanctioned violence against women has been persistent since ancient times."

Views on the influence of Islam on domestic violence differ. While some authors argue that Islam is connected to violence against women, especially in the form of honor killings, others, such as Tahira Shahid Khan, a professor specializing in women's issues at the Aga Khan University in Pakistan, argue that it is the domination of men and inferior status of women in society that lead to these acts, not the religion itself. Public (such as through the media) and political discourse debating the relation between Islam, immigration, and violence against women is highly controversial in many Western countries.

Among Christians, men and women who attend church more frequently are less likely to commit domestic violence against their partners. The effect of church attendance is not caused by increased levels of social support and community integration, which are not significantly related to the perpetration of domestic violence. In addition, even when variations in psychological problems (namely depressive symptoms, low self-esteem, and alcoholism) are accounted for, the salutary effect of church attendance remains. People who are theologically conservative are no more likely to commit domestic violence, however, highly conservative men are significantly more likely to commit domestic violence when their partners are much more liberal than them.

Catholic teaching on divorce has led women to fear leaving abusive marriages. However, Catholic bishops specifically state that no person is obliged to remain within an abusive marriage.

Medieval Jewish authorities differed on the subject of wife beating. Most rabbis living in Islamic lands allowed it as a tool of discipline, while those from Christian France and Germany generally saw it as justifying immediate divorce.

== Prevention ==
Religions, ethical systems, and societies rarely promote violence as an end in of itself. At the same time, some religious groups have justified or incited violence to prevent a perceived greater evil.

=== Secularism as a response to religious violence ===
Byron Bland, scholar of conflict and peacemaking, asserts that one of the most prominent reasons for the "rise of the secular in Western thought" was the reaction against the religious violence of the 16th and 17th centuries. He asserts, "The secular was a way of living with the religious differences that had produced so much horror. Under secularity, political entities have a warrant to make decisions independent from the need to enforce particular versions of religious orthodoxy. Indeed, they may run counter to certain strongly held beliefs if made in the interest of common welfare. Thus, one of the important goals of the secular is to limit violence". Theologian William T. Cavanaugh writes that what he calls, "the myth of religious violence", as a reason for the rise of secular states may be traced to earlier philosophers, such as Spinoza, Hobbes, Locke, Rousseau, and Voltaire. Cavanaugh delivers a detailed critique of this idea in his 2009 book The Myth of Religious Violence: Secular Ideology and the Roots of Modern Conflict.

== Challenges to the belief that religions are violent ==
=== Behavioral studies ===
Decades of research conducted by anthropologists, sociologists, and psychologists have established that "religious congruence", the assumption that religious beliefs and values are tightly integrated in an individual's mind or that religious practices and behaviors follow directly from religious beliefs or that religious beliefs are chronologically linear and stable across different contexts, is actually rare, despite being commonly assumed. People's religious ideas are fragmented, loosely connected, and context-dependent, as in all other domains of culture and in life. The beliefs, affiliations, and behaviors of an individual are complex activities that have many sources, including culture.

=== Myth of religious violence ===
According to historian Andrew Holt's study of the causes of wars, religion is not a common source for war or conflict. The prevalence of secularist violence against religious people in the modern period casts doubt that religious violence is a common historical source for violence.

American Catholic theologian William T. Cavanaugh has argued in his book The Myth of Religious Violence that "attempts to separate religious and secular violence are incoherent". He asserts that "the idea that religion has a tendency to promote violence is part of the conventional wisdom of Western societies and it underlies many of our institutions and policies, from limits on the public role of churches to efforts to promote liberal democracy in the Middle East". Cavanaugh challenges this conventional wisdom, arguing that there is a "myth of religious violence", by asserting that:

- Religion is not a universal and transhistorical phenomenon. What counts as "religious" or "secular" in some context is a function of configurations of power both in the West and in lands colonized by the West. The distinctions of "Religious/Secular" and "Religious/Political" are modern Western inventions.
- The invention of the concept of "religious violence" helps the West reinforce superiority of Western social orders to "nonsecular" social orders, namely Muslims at the time of publication.
- The concept of "religious violence" can be and is used to legitimate violence against non-Western "Others".
- Peace depends on a balanced view of violence and recognition that so-called secular ideologies and institutions can be just as prone to absolutism, divisiveness, and irrationality.

Historian and religious studies scholar Jeffrey Burton Russell generally concurs with Cavanaugh in his book Exposing Myths about Christianity, arguing that numerous cases of supposed religious violence, such as the Thirty Years War, the French Wars of Religion, the Protestant-Catholic conflict in Ireland, the Sri Lankan Civil War, and the Rwandan Civil War, were all primarily motivated by social, political, and economic issues rather than religion.

Religious studies scholars John Morreall and Tamara Sonn have extended Russell's claims by arguing that all cases of violence and war include social, political, and economic dimensions. They posit that since there is no consensus on definitions of "religion" among scholars and since there is no way to isolate "religion" from the rest of the more likely motivational dimensions, it is incorrect to label any violent event as "religious". Since dozens of examples exist from the European wars of religion that show that people from the same religions fought each other and that people from different religions became allies during these conflicts, the motivations for these conflicts were not about religion, they claim. Russell adds that the fact that these wars of religion ended after rulers agreed to practice their religions in their own territories means that the conflicts were more related to political control than people's religious views.

Robert Pape, a political scientist who specializes in suicide terrorism, has made this case for modern suicide attacks, which are often labeled as "religious" by media outlets. Pape compiled the first complete database of every documented suicide bombing from 1980–2003. He argues that news reports about suicide attacks are profoundly misleading, arguing, "There is little connection between suicide terrorism and Islamic fundamentalism, or any one of the world's religions". After studying 315 suicide attacks carried out over the last two decades, he concludes that suicide bombers' actions stem fundamentally from political conflict, not religious beliefs.

Anthropologist Scott Atran conducted extensive interviews on suicide terrorism with terrorists from Al Qaeda, Hamas, Taliban, and others to see why some are willing to die and kill for and he noted that they do not die for a cause, they die for their communities, family, friends; all for the hope of a better future for their communities.

Author Karen Armstrong, of Irish Catholic descent, echoes these sentiments by arguing that so-called religious conflicts such as the Crusades, the Spanish Inquisition, and the European wars of religion were all deeply political conflicts at their cores rather than religious ones, especially since people from different faiths became allies and fought against each other in no consistent fashion. She claims that the Western concept of the separation of church and state, first advocated by Reformer Martin Luther, laid a foundation for viewing religion and society as divided, when in reality, religion and society were intermixed to the point that no one made such a distinction, nor was there a defining cut between such experiences in the past. She argues the during the Enlightenment, religion began to be seen as individualistic and private, despite the fact that modern secular ideals like the equality of all human beings and intellectual and political liberty were historically promoted in religious idioms of the past.

Anthropologist Jack David Eller has also asserted that religion is not inherently violent, arguing that "religion and violence are clearly compatible, but they are not identical"; that "violence is neither essential to nor exclusive to religion"; and that "virtually every form of religious violence has its nonreligious corollary". Moreover, he argues that religion "may be more a marker of the [conflicting] groups than an actual point of contention between them".

On the other hand, historians such as Jonathan Kirsch have likened religious persecutions like the European inquisitions to persecutions in Stalin's Soviet Union and Nazi Germany, McCarthy blacklists, and other secular events.

John Teehan, scholar of the philosophy and cognitive science of religion, takes a position that integrates the two sides of this debate. He describes the traditional response in defense of religion as "draw[ing] a distinction between the religion and what is done in the name of that religion or its faithful". Teehan argues, "this approach to religious violence may be understandable but it is ultimately untenable and prevents us from gaining any useful insight into either religion or religious violence". He takes the position that "violence done in the name of religion is not a perversion of religious belief ... but flows naturally from the moral logic inherent in many religious systems, particularly monotheistic religions ...". However, Teehan acknowledges that "religions are also powerful sources of morality". He asserts, "religious morality and religious violence both spring from the same source, and this is the evolutionary psychology underlying religious ethics".

=== Secular violence ===
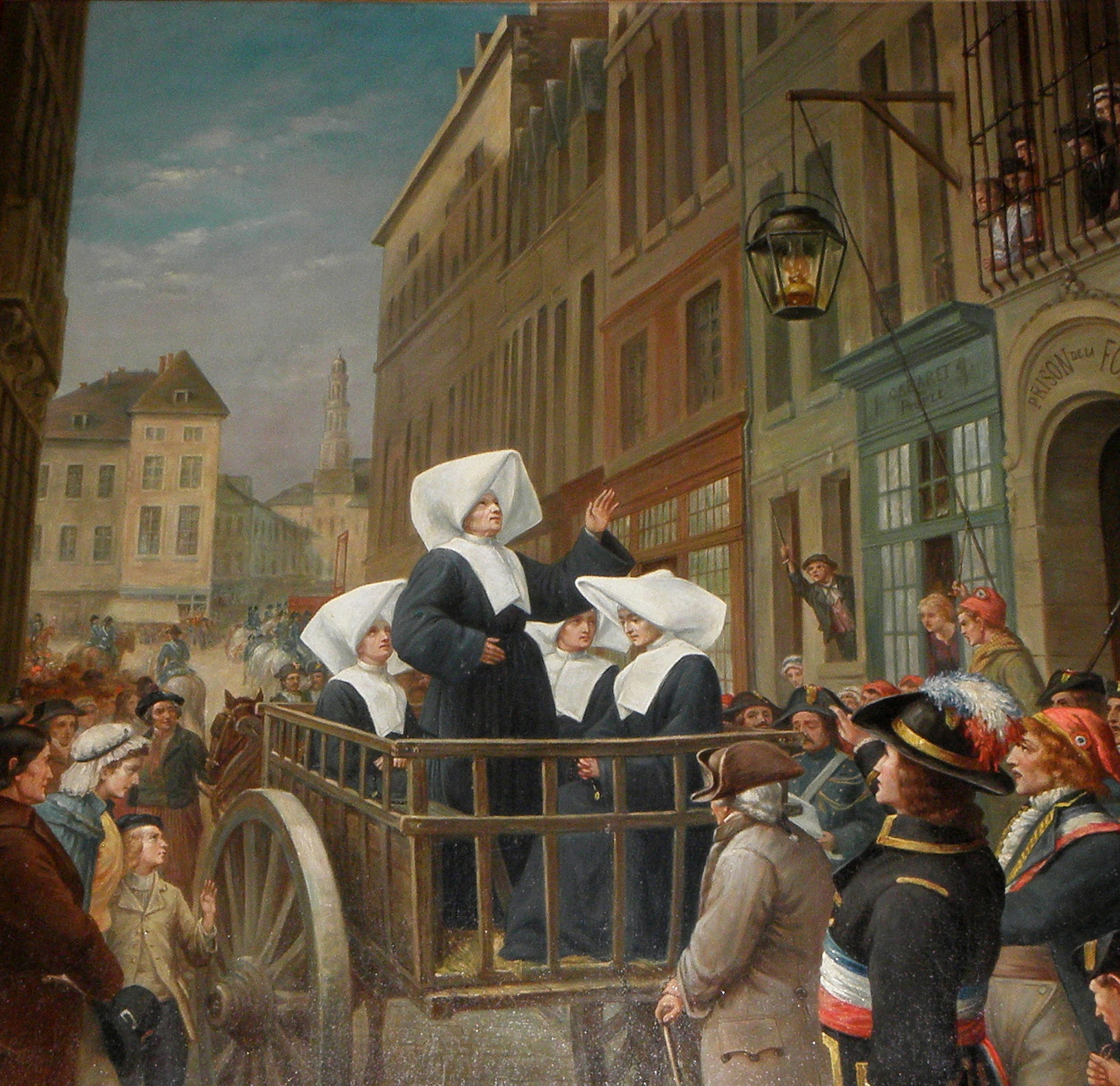
Nuns transported in a tumbril to the guillotine in Cambrai during the Reign of Terror in France, June 1794

According to historian Thomas Howard, violence committed by secularist regimes against religious groups in the 20th century alone vastly outnumber the violence committed by religious entities in the early modern period. Secularist violence took many forms: forced abolition of long-standing religious practices, institutions, and holy days; confiscation and destruction of religious property or objects, requiring oaths of allegiance, censorship, secret-police surveillance, banning or dominating religious education, coercing believers into psychiatric institutions, travel bans and restrictions, public ridicule, desecrating the dead, promotion of anti-religious propaganda, punitive taxation, show trials, imprisonment, deportation, forced labor, reeducation camps, struggle sessions, torture, and execution. Secular violence is often a blind spot since Western narratives often display bias on secularism as being a somehow different than religion.

Gender and societies scholar Janet Jakobsen writes, "just as religion and secularism are relationally defined terms—terms that depend on each other—so also the legitimization of violence through either religious or secular discourse is also relational". She argues that the idea that "religion kills" is used to legitimate secular violence, and that, similarly, the idea that "secularism kills" is used to legitimate religious violence. According to John Carlson, critics who are skeptical of "religious violence" contend that excessive attention is often paid to acts of religious violence compared to acts of secular violence, and that this leads to a false essentializing of both religion as being prone to violence and the secular as being prone to peace. According to Janet Jakobsen, secularism and modern secular states are much more violent than religion, and modern secular states in particular are usually the source of most of the world's violence. Carlson states that by focusing on the destructive capacity of government, Jakobsen "essentializes another category — the secular state — even as she criticizes secular governments that essentialize religion's violent propensities".

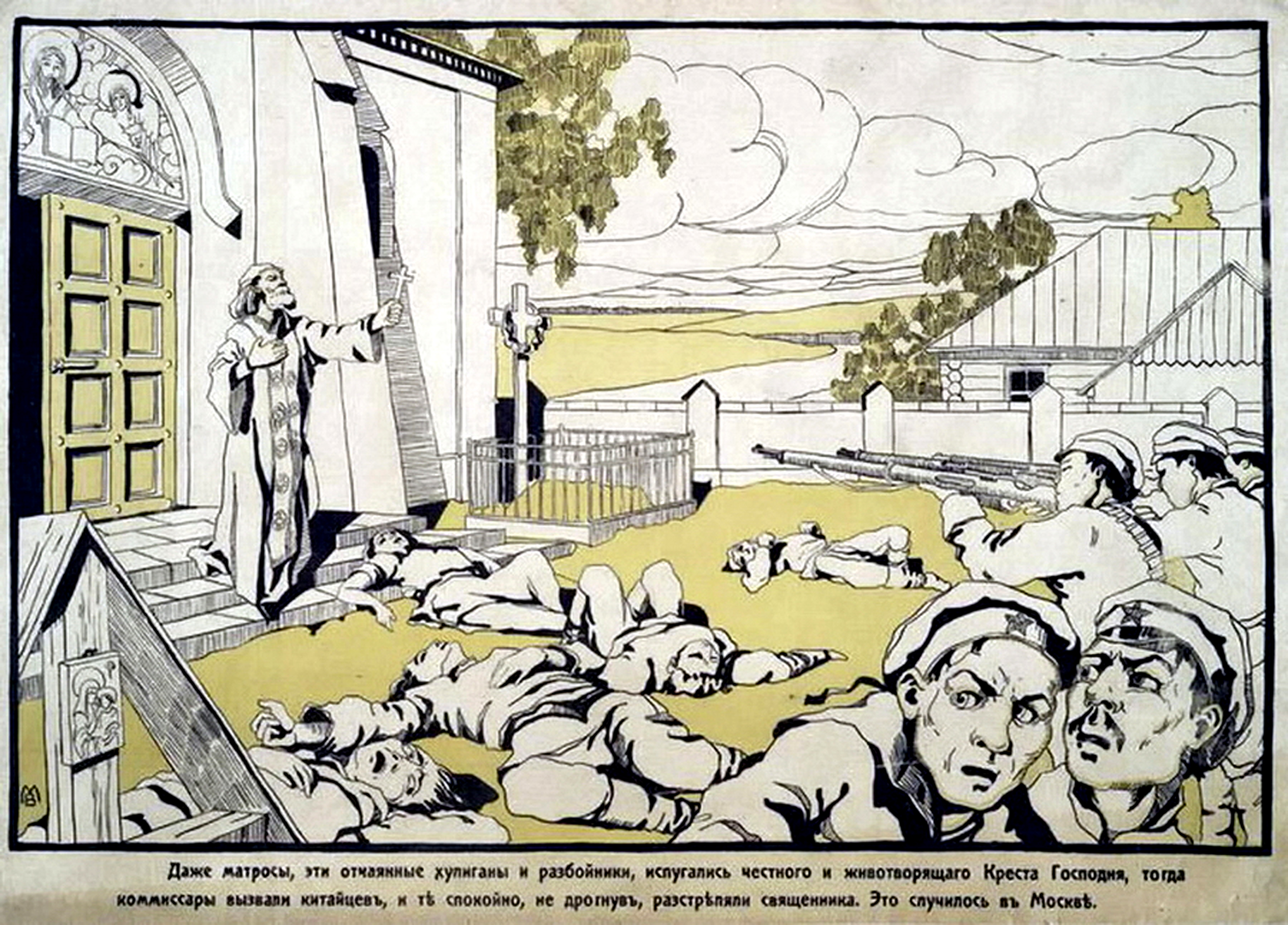
Chinese Chekists executing an Orthodox priest in Moscow during the Red Terror, shown on a White Russian anti-Bolshevik propaganda poster, c. 1920

Tanner states that secular regimes and leaders have used violence to promote their own agendas. Violence or persecutions committed by secular governments and people against the religious have been documented in many regions notably such as in the Soviet Union, Cambodia, China, Mexico, Spain, Turkey, Romania, Czechoslovakia, Albania, Mongolia, Tibet, North Korea, Laos, Vietnam, Cuba. In the 20th century, estimates state that over 25 million Christians died from secular antireligious violence worldwide. Historian Andrew Holt estimates that 67 million to 100 million deaths from secular ideologies occurred in the 20th century alone and that such ideologies did not result in a decrease in violence.

Religions have been persecuted more in the past 100 years than at any other time in history. According to Geoffrey Blainey, atrocities have occurred under all ideologies, including in nations which were strongly secular such as the Soviet Union, China, and Cambodia. Talal Asad, an anthropologist, states that equating institutional religion with violence and fanaticism is incorrect and that devastating cruelties and atrocities done by non-religious institutions in the 20th century should not be overlooked. He also states that nationalism has been argued as being a secularized religion.

== Violence in religions ==
=== Abrahamic religions ===
Hector Avalos argues that, because religions claim to have divine favor for themselves, both over and against other groups, this sense of self-righteousness leads to violence because conflicting claims of superiority, based on unverifiable appeals to God, cannot be objectively adjudicated.

Similarly, Eric Hickey writes, "the history of religious violence in the West is as long as the historical record of its three major religions, Judaism, Christianity, and Islam, with their mutual antagonisms and their struggles to adapt and survive despite the secular forces that threaten their continued existence."

Regina Schwartz argues that all monotheistic religions, including Christianity, are inherently violent because of their exclusivism which inevitably fosters violence against those who are considered outsiders. Lawrence Wechsler asserts that Schwartz is not just arguing that Abrahamic religions have a violent legacy, instead, she is arguing that their legacy is actually genocidal in nature.

=== Christianity ===
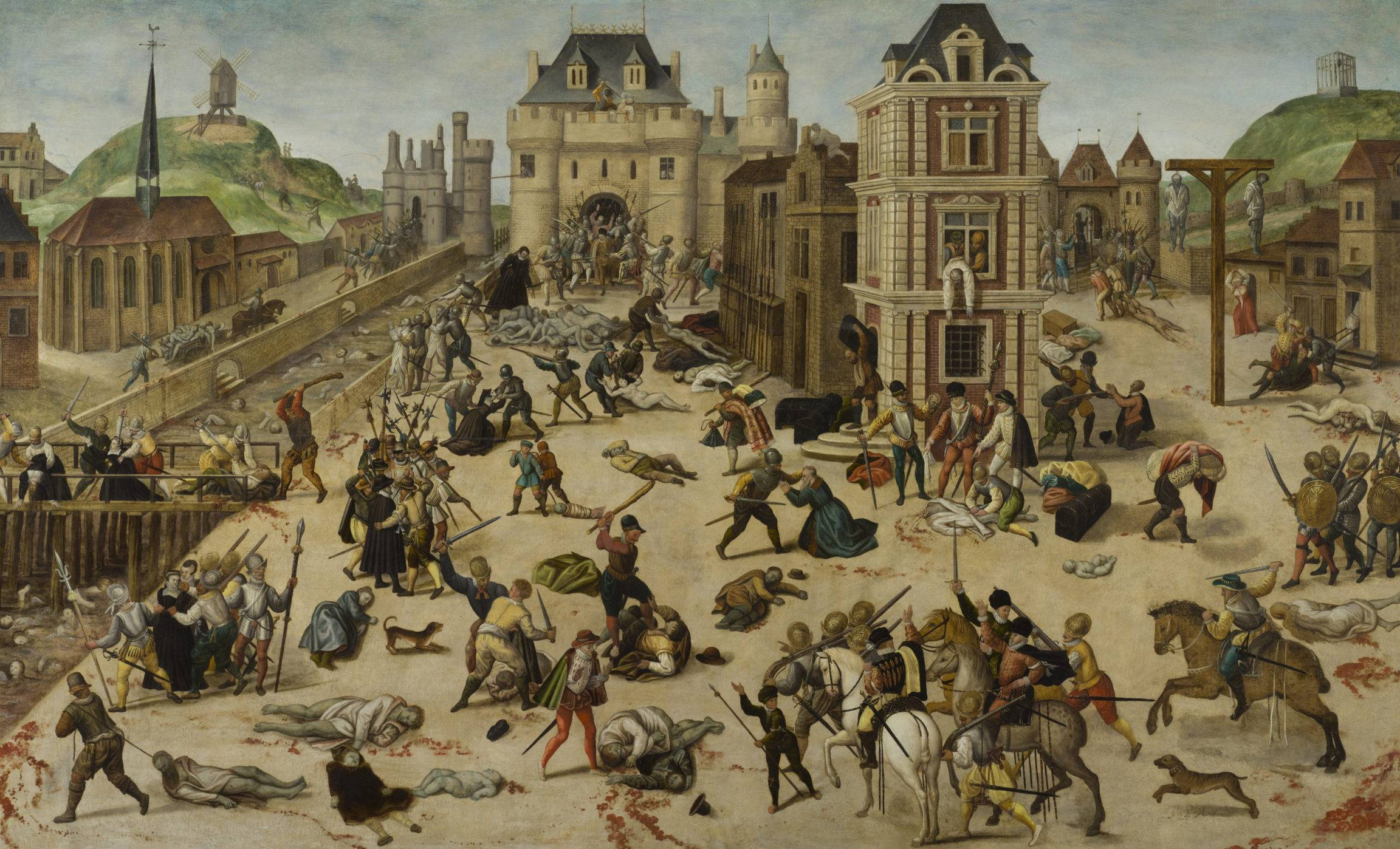
The St. Bartholomew's Day massacre of French Protestants in 1572

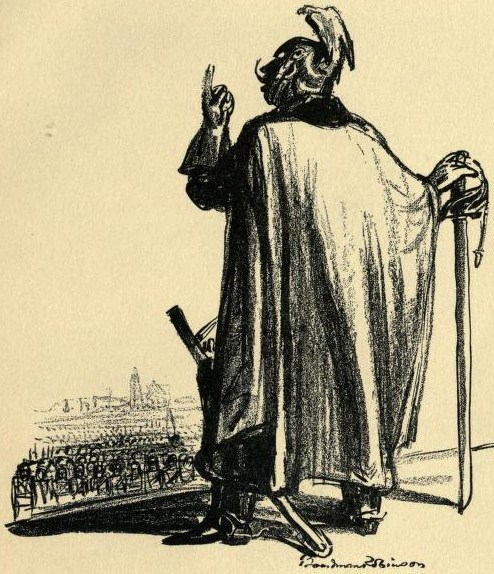
I Believe in the Sword and Almighty God (1914) by Boardman Robinson

Before the 11th century, Christians had not developed the doctrine of "Holy war", the belief that fighting itself might be considered a penitential and spiritually meritorious act. Throughout the Middle Ages, force could not be used to propagate religion. For the first three centuries of Christianity, the Church taught the pacifism of Jesus and notable church fathers such as Justin Martyr, Tertullian, Origen, and Cyprian of Carthage even went as far as arguing against joining the military or using any form of violence against aggressors. In the 4th century, St. Augustine developed a "Just War" concept, whereby limited uses of war would be considered acceptable in order to preserve the peace and retain orthodoxy if it was waged: for defensive purposes, ordered by an authority, had honorable intentions, and produced minimal harm. However, the criteria he used was already developed by Roman thinkers in the past and "Augustine's perspective was not based on the New Testament." St. Augustine's "Just War" concept was widely accepted, however, warfare was not regarded as virtuous in any way. Expression of concern for the salvation of those who killed enemies in battle, regardless of the cause for which they fought, was common. In the medieval period which began after the fall of Rome, there were increases in the level of violence due to political instability. By the 11th century, the Church condemned this violence and warring by introducing: the "Peace of God" which prohibited attacks on clergy, pilgrims, townspeople, peasants and property; the "Truce of God" which banned warfare on Sundays, Fridays, Lent, and Easter; and it imposed heavy penances on soldiers for killing and injuring others because it believed that the shedding of other people's blood was the same as shedding the blood of Christ.

During the 9th and 10th centuries, multiple invasions occurred in some regions in Europe and these invasions lead them to form their own armies in order to defend themselves and by the 11th century, this slowly lead to the emergence of the Crusades, the concept of "holy war", and terminology such as "enemies of God". By the time of the Crusades, "Despite all the violence during this period, the majority of Christians were not active participants but were more often its victims" and groups which used nonviolent means to peacefully dialogue with Muslims were established, like the Franciscans.

Today, the relationship between Christianity and violence is the subject of controversy because one view advocates the belief that Christianity advocates peace, love and compassion despite the fact that in certain instances, its adherents have also resorted to violence. Peace, compassion and forgiveness of wrongs done by others are key elements of Christian teaching. However, Christians have struggled since the days of the Church Fathers with the question of when the use of force is justified (e.g. the Just war theory of Saint Augustine). Such debates have led to concepts such as just war theory. Throughout history, certain teachings from the Old Testament, the New Testament and Christian theology have been used to justify the use of force against heretics, sinners and external enemies. Heitman and Hagan identify the Inquisitions, Crusades, wars of religion, and antisemitism as being "among the most notorious examples of Christian violence". To this list, Mennonite theologian J. Denny Weaver adds "warrior popes, support of capital punishment, corporal punishment under the guise of 'spare the rod spoil the child,' justifications of slavery, world-wide colonialism under the guise of converting people to Christianity, the systemic violence against women who are subjected to the rule of men." Weaver employs a broader definition of violence that extends the meaning of the word to cover "harm or damage", not just physical violence per se. Thus, under his definition, Christian violence includes "forms of systemic violence such as poverty, racism, and sexism".

Christian theologians point to a strong doctrinal and historical imperative against violence that exists within Christianity, particularly Jesus' Sermon on the Mount, which taught nonviolence and "love of enemies". For example, Weaver asserts that Jesus' pacifism was "preserved in the justifiable war doctrine which declares that all war is sin even when it is occasionally declared to be a necessary evil, and in the prohibition of fighting by monastics and clergy as well as in a persistent tradition of Christian pacifism".

Between 1420 and 1431 the Hussite heretics fended off 5 anti-Hussite Crusades ordered by the Pope.

Many authors highlight the ironical contradiction between Christianity's claims to be centered on "love and peace" while, at the same time, harboring a "violent side". For example, Mark Juergensmeyer argues: "that despite its central tenets of love and peace, Christianity—like most traditions—has always had a violent side. The bloody history of the tradition has provided images as disturbing as those provided by Islam, and violent conflict is vividly portrayed in the Bible. This history and these biblical images have provided the raw material for theologically justifying the violence of contemporary Christian groups. For example, attacks on abortion clinics have been viewed not only as assaults on a practice that some Christians regard as immoral, but also as skirmishes in a grand confrontation between forces of evil and good that has social and political implications.", sometimes referred to as spiritual warfare. The statement attributed to Jesus "I come not to bring peace, but to bring a sword" has been interpreted by some as a call to arms to Christians.

Maurice Bloch also argues that the Christian faith fosters violence because the Christian faith is a religion, and religions are violent by their very nature; moreover, he argues that religion and politics are two sides of the same coin—power. Others have argued that religion and the exercise of force are deeply intertwined, but they have also stated that religion may pacify, as well as channel and heighten violent impulses.

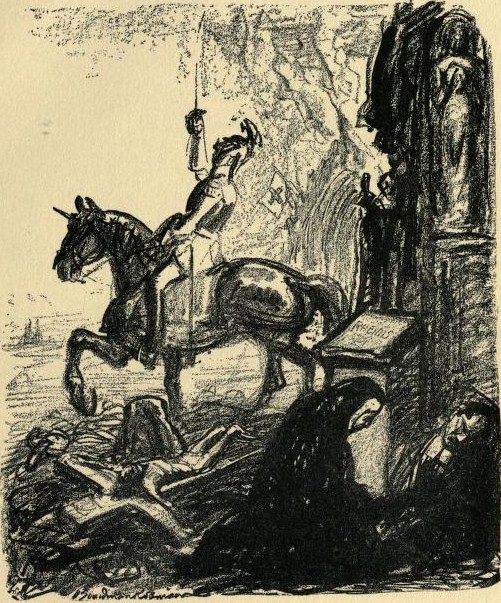
Forward with God! (1915) by Boardman Robinson

In response to the view that Christianity and violence are intertwined, Miroslav Volf and J. Denny Weaver reject charges that Christianity is a violent religion, arguing that certain aspects of Christianity might be misused to support violence but that a genuine interpretation of its core elements would not sanction human violence but would instead resist it. Among the examples that are commonly used to argue that Christianity is a violent religion, J. Denny Weaver lists "(the) Crusades, the multiple blessings of wars, warrior popes, support of capital punishment, corporal punishment under the guise of 'spare the rod and spoil the child,' justifications of slavery, world-wide colonialism in the name of converting people to Christianity, the systemic violence against women who are subjected to the rule of men." Weaver characterizes the counter-argument as focusing on "Jesus, the beginning point of Christian faith,... whose Sermon on the Mount taught nonviolence and love of enemies; who nonviolently faced his death at the hands of his accusers; whose nonviolent teaching inspired the first centuries of pacifist Christian history and was subsequently preserved in the justifiable war doctrine that declares that all war is sin even when it is occasionally declared to be a necessary evil, and in the prohibition of fighting by monastics and clergy as well as in a persistent tradition of Christian pacifism."

Miroslav Volf acknowledges the fact that "many contemporaries see religion as a pernicious social ill that needs aggressive treatment rather than medicine from which a cure is expected." However, Volf contests the claim that "(the) Christian faith, as one of the major world religions, predominantly fosters violence." Instead of this negative assessment, Volf argues that Christianity "should be seen as a contributor to more peaceful social environments." Volf examines the question of whether or not Christianity fosters violence, and he has identified four main arguments which claim that it does: that religion by its nature is violent, which occurs when people try to act as "soldiers of God"; that monotheism entails violence, because a claim of universal truth divides people into "us versus them"; that creation, as in the Book of Genesis, is an act of violence; and the argument that the intervention of a "new creation", as in the Second Coming, generates violence. Writing about the latter, Volf says: "Beginning at least with Constantine's conversion, the followers of the Crucified have perpetrated gruesome acts of violence under the sign of the cross. Over the centuries, the seasons of Lent and Holy Week were, for the Jews, times of fear and trepidation; Christians have perpetrated some of the worst pogroms as they remembered the crucifixion of Christ, for which they blamed the Jews. Muslims also associate the cross with violence; crusaders' rampages were undertaken under the sign of the cross." In each case, Volf concluded that the Christian faith was misused in order to justify violence. Volf argues that "thin" readings of Christianity might be used mischievously to support the use of violence. He counters, however, by asserting that "thick" readings of Christianity's core elements will not sanction human violence, instead, they will resist it.

Volf asserts that Christian churches suffer from a "confusion of loyalties". He asserts that "rather than the character of the Christian faith itself, a better explanation as to why Christian churches are either impotent in the face of violent conflicts or are active participants in them is derived from the proclivities of its adherents which are at odds with the character of the Christian faith." Volf observes that "(although) they are explicitly giving ultimate allegiance to the Gospel of Jesus Christ, many Christians in fact seem to have an overriding commitment to their respective cultures and ethnic groups."

==== The Church of Jesus Christ of Latter-day Saints ====
The Church of Jesus Christ of Latter-day Saints has an early history of violence. It was motivated by Anti-Mormonism and began with the religious persecution of the Church by well respected citizens, law enforcement, and government officials. Ultimately, this persecution lead to several historically well-known acts of violence. These ranged from attacks on early members, such as the Haun's Mill massacre following the Mormon Extermination Order to one of the most controversial and well-known cases of retaliation violence, the Mountain Meadows massacre. This was the result of an unprovoked response to religious persecution whereby an innocent party which was traveling through Church occupied territory was attacked on 11 September 1857.

=== Islam ===
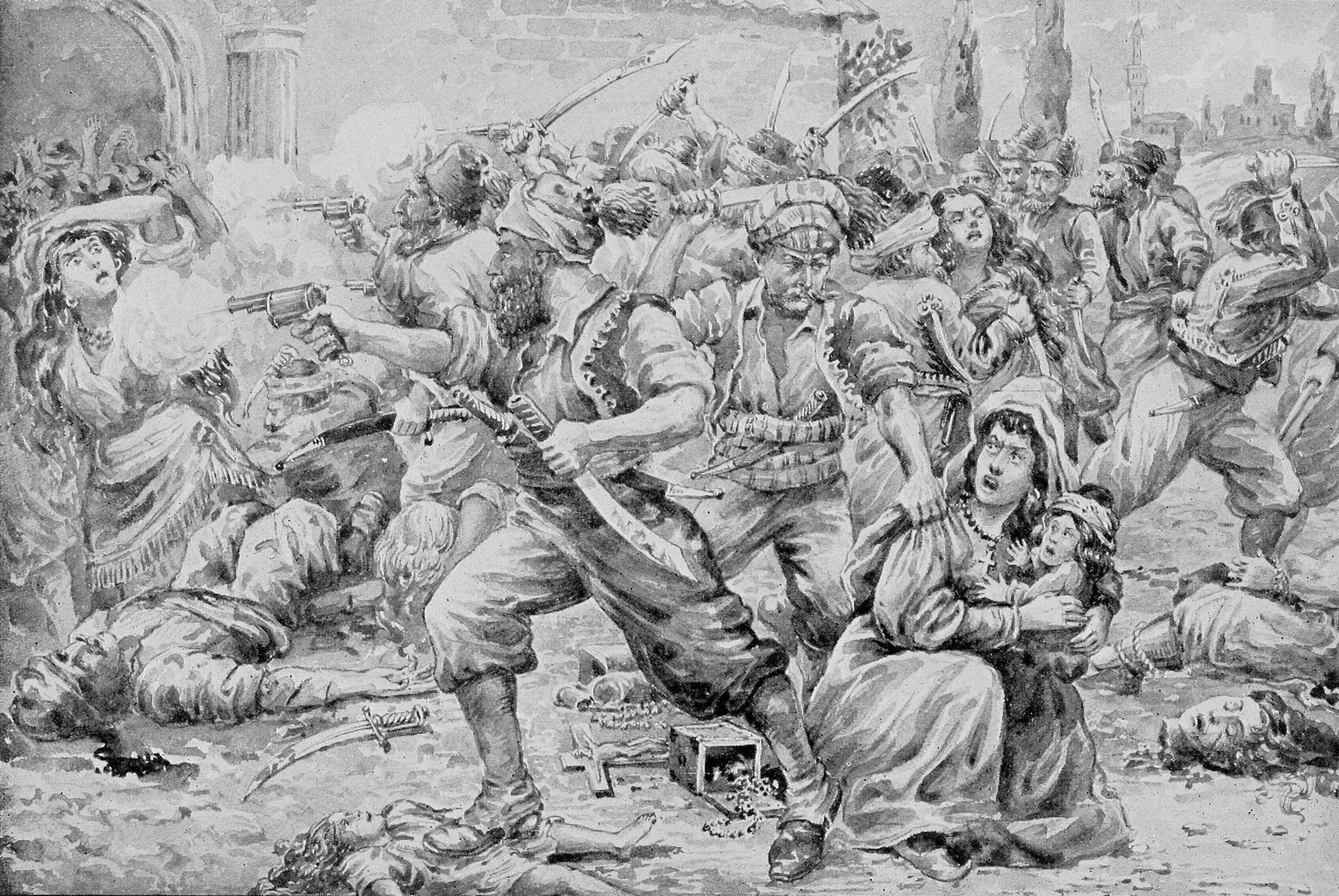
Sketch by an eye-witness of the massacre of Armenians in Sasun in 1894

Islam has been associated with violence in a variety of contexts, including the context of punishment of apostasy in Islam, sectarian violence among Muslims, Jihadism and Islamic terrorism. In English, the Arabic word jihād is translated as "struggle". Jihad appears in the Qur'an and frequently, it also appears in the idiomatic expression "striving in the way of Allah (al-jihad fi sabil Allah)". The context of the word can be seen in its usage in Arabic translations of the New Testament such as in 2 Timothy 4:7 where St. Paul expresses keeping the faith after many struggles. A person engaged in jihad is called a mujahid; the plural is mujahideen. Jihad is an important religious duty for Muslims. A minority among the Sunni scholars sometimes refer to this duty as the sixth pillar of Islam, though it occupies no such official status. In Twelver Shi'a Islam, however, Jihad is one of the ten Practices of the Religion. For some the Quran seem to endorse unequivocally to violence. On the other hand, some scholars argue that such verses of the Quran are interpreted out of context.

According to the results of a study which was published by Gallup, most Muslims understand the word "Jihad" to mean an individual's struggle to be a good Muslim, rather than a concept which is violent or militaristic. Muslims use the word in a religious context to refer to three types of struggles: an internal struggle to maintain faith, the struggle to improve the Muslim society, or the struggle in a holy war. The prominent British orientalist Bernard Lewis argues that in the Qur'an and the hadith jihad implies warfare in the large majority of cases. In a commentary of the hadith Sahih Muslim, entitled al-Minhaj, the medieval Islamic scholar Yahya ibn Sharaf al-Nawawi stated that "one of the collective duties of the community as a whole (fard kifaya) is to lodge a valid protest, to solve problems of religion, to have knowledge of Divine Law, to command what is right and forbid wrong conduct".

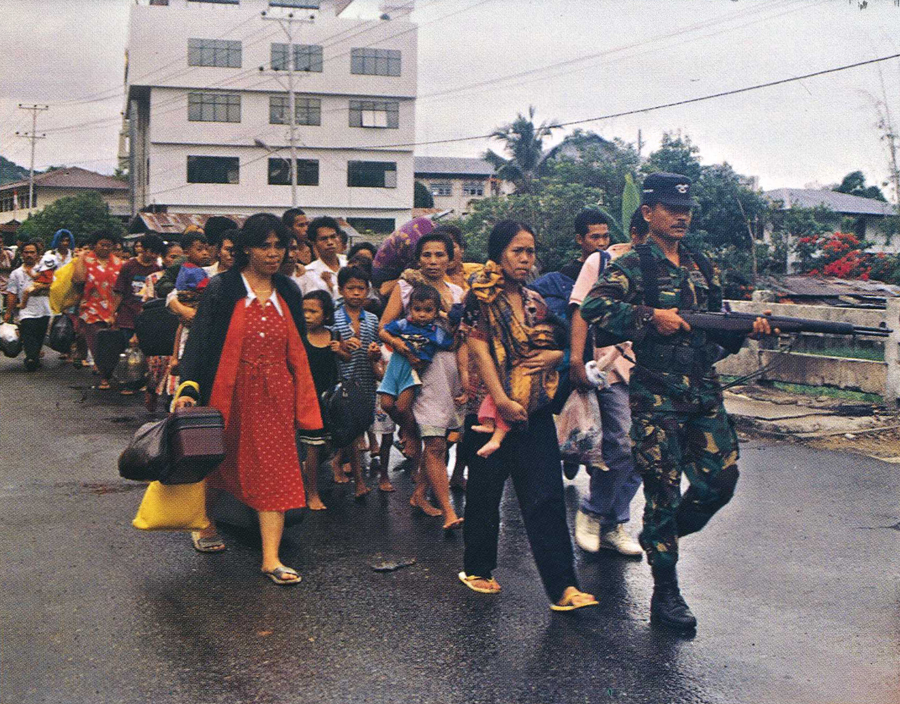
Indonesian military forces evacuate refugees from Ambon during the Maluku sectarian conflict in 1999.

According to Irfan Omar, Islam has a long history of nonviolence and negotiation in relation to conflicts: for instance, early Muslims experienced 83 conflicts with non-Muslims but only 4 of these conflicts degenerated into armed conflicts.

==== Terrorism in Islam ====
In western societies, the term jihad is often translated as "holy war". Scholars of Islamic studies often stress the fact that these two terms are not synonymous. Muslim authors, in particular, tend to reject such an approach, stressing the non-militant connotations of the word.

Islamic terrorism refers to terrorism that is engaged in by Muslim groups or individuals who are motivated by either politics, religion or both. Terrorist acts have included airline hijacking, kidnapping, assassination, suicide bombing, and mass murder.

The tension reached a climax on 11 September 2001 when Islamic terrorists flew hijacked commercial airplanes into the World Trade Center in New York City and the Pentagon in Washington, D.C. The "war on terror" has triggered anti-Muslim sentiments within most western countries and throughout the rest of the world. Al-Qaeda is one of the most well-known Islamic extremist groups, created by Osama bin Mohammed bin Awad bin Laden. Al-Qaeda's goal is to spread the "purest" form of Islam and Islamic law. Based on his interpretation of the Quran, bin Laden needed to do "good" by inflicting terror upon millions of people. Following the terrorist attacks on 11 September, bin Laden praised the suicide bombers in his statement: "the great action you did which was first and foremost by the grace of Allah. This is the guidance of Allah and the blessed fruit of jihad." In contrast, echoing the overwhelming majority of people who interpreted these events, President Bush said on 11 September, "Freedom itself was attacked this morning by a faceless coward. ... And freedom will be defended. Make no mistake, the United States will hunt down and punish those responsible for these cowardly acts."

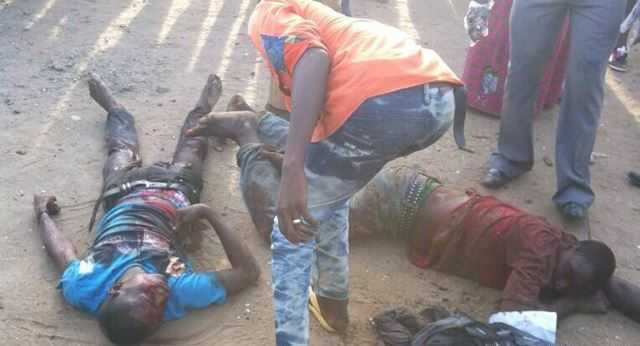
Wounded people following a bomb attack by Boko Haram in Nigeria, in April 2014

Controversies surrounding the subject include disagreements over whether terrorist acts are self-defense or aggression, national self-determination or Islamic supremacy; whether Islam can ever condone the targeting of non-combatants; whether some attacks described as Islamic terrorism are merely terrorist acts committed by Muslims or terrorist acts motivated by nationalism; whether Wahhabism are at the root of Islamic terrorism, or simply one cause of it; how much support for Islamic terrorism exists in the Muslim world and whether support of terrorism is only a temporary phenomenon, a "bubble", now fading away.

=== Judaism ===
As the religion of the Jews, who are also known as Israelites, Judaism is based on the Torah and the Tanakh, which is also referred to as the Hebrew Bible, and it guides its adherents on how to live, die, and fight via the 613 commandments which are referred to as the 613 Mitzvahs, the most famous of which are the Ten Commandments, one of which is the commandment You shall not murder.

The Torah also lists instances and circumstances which require adherents of it to go to war and kill their enemies. Such a war is usually referred to as a Milkhemet Mitzvah, a "compulsory war" which is obligated by the Torah or God, or a Milkhemet Reshut, a "voluntary war".

Burggraeve and Vervenne describe the Old Testament as being full of violence and they also cite it as evidence for the existence of both a violent society and a violent god. They write that, "(i)n numerous Old Testament texts the power and glory of Israel's God is described in the language of violence." They assert that more than one thousand passages refer to Yahweh as acting violently or supporting the violence of humans and they also assert that more than one hundred passages involve divine commands to kill humans.

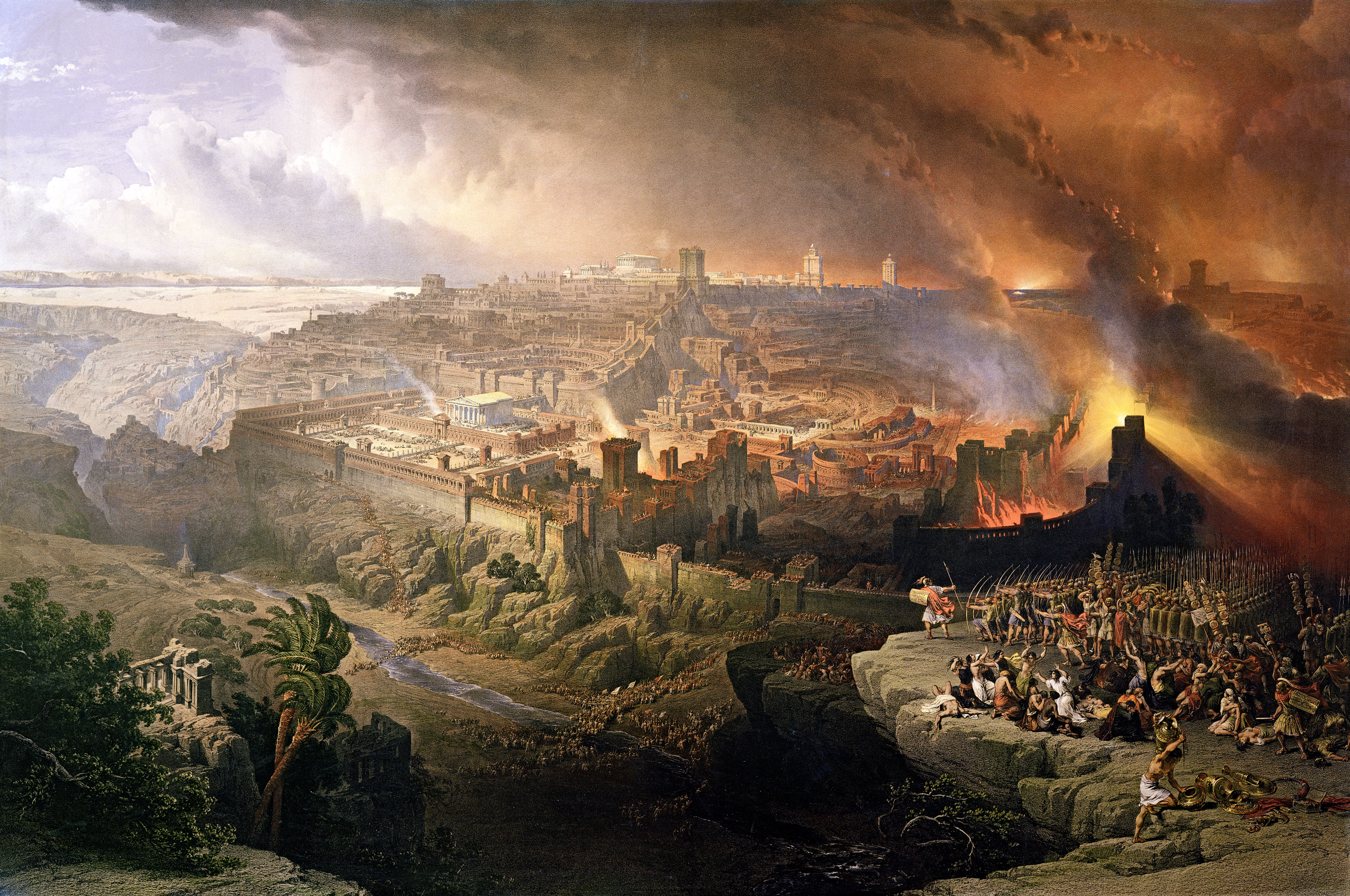
Painting of the destruction of the Jerusalem Temple in 70 AD. This event contributed to the sense of unrest and messianic expectations that played a significant role in the Diaspora Revolt.

On the basis of these passages in the Old Testament, some Christian churches and theologians argue that Judaism is a violent religion and the god of Israel is a violent god. Reuven Firestone asserts that these assertions are usually made in the context of claims that Christianity is a religion of peace and the god of Christianity is one who only expresses love.

Some scholars such as Deborah Weissman readily acknowledge the fact that "normative Judaism is not pacifist" and "violence is condoned in the service of self-defense."However, the Talmud prohibits violence of any kind towards one's neighbour. J. Patout Burns asserts that, although Judaism condones the use of violence in certain cases, Jewish tradition clearly posits the principle of minimization of violence. This principle can be stated as "(wherever) Jewish law allows violence to keep an evil from occurring, it mandates that the minimal amount of violence must be used in order to accomplish one's goal."

The love and pursuit of peace, as well as laws which require the eradication of evil, sometimes by the use of violent means, co-exist in the Jewish tradition.

The Hebrew Bible contains instances of religiously mandated wars which often contain explicit instructions from God to the Israelites to exterminate other tribes, as in Deuteronomy 7:1–2 or Deuteronomy 20:16–18. Examples include the story of the Amalekites (Deuteronomy 25:17–19, 1 Samuel 15:1–6), the story of the Midianites (Numbers 31:1–18), and the battle of Jericho (Joshua 6:1–27).

The biblical wars of extermination have been characterized as campaigns of "genocide" by several authorities, because the Torah states that the Israelites annihilated entire ethnic groups or tribes: the Israelites killed all Amalekites, including men, women, and children (1 Samuel 15:1–20); the Israelites killed all men, women, and children in the battle of Jericho(Joshua 6:15–21), and the Israelites killed all men, women and children of several Canaanite tribes (Joshua 10:28–42). However, some scholars believe that these accounts in the Torah are exaggerated or metaphorical.

During the Palestine-Israeli conflict as well as during the broader Arab–Israeli conflict, a small number of people have used the Torah (Tanakh) to justify anti-Palestinianism and the killing of Palestinians, but the IDF has stated "That we don't condone the killing of innocent Palestinians".

On several occasions, Jewish fundamentalists have associated Palestinians with biblical antagonists, particularly with the Amalekites. For example, Rabbi Israel Hess has recommended that Palestinians be killed, based on biblical verses such as 1 Samuel 15.

=== Hinduism ===
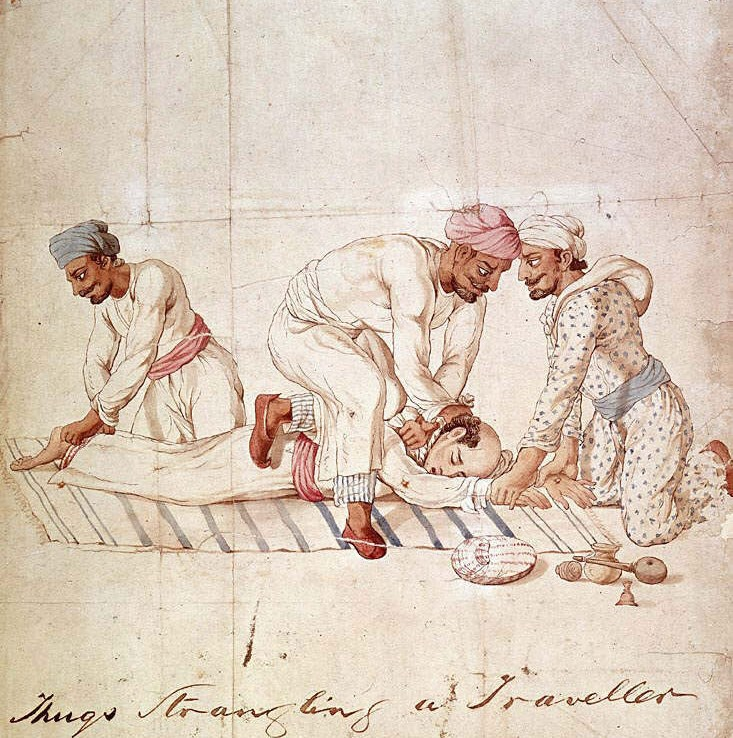
The Thuggee was a secret cult of assassins whose members were both Hindus and Muslims.

=== Neo-paganism ===
In the United States and Europe, neo-pagan beliefs have been associated with many terrorist incidents. Although the majority of neo-pagans oppose violence and racism, folkish factions of Odinism, Wotanism, and Ásatrú emphasize their Nordic cultural heritage and idolize warriors. For these reasons, a 1999 Federal Bureau of Investigation report on domestic terrorism which was titled Project Megiddo described Odinism as "[lending] itself to violence and [having] the potential to inspire its followers to violence." As of 2017, the Southern Poverty Law Center has recognized at least two active neo-pagan hate groups in the United States. Many white supremacists (especially those white supremacists who are in prison) are converting to Odinism at increasing rates, citing the impurity of Christianity and the failure of previous groups to accomplish goals as the primary reasons for their conversion. Similarities between Odinism and other extremist groups such as Christian Identity facilitate conversions. The targets of neo-pagan violence are similar to those of white supremacist terrorists and nationalist terrorists, but an added target includes Christians and churches.

=== Indigenous religions ===
Within Prehistoric societies, war ceremonies were one of the main parts of indigenous religions such as some Native American religions.

== Conflicts and wars ==
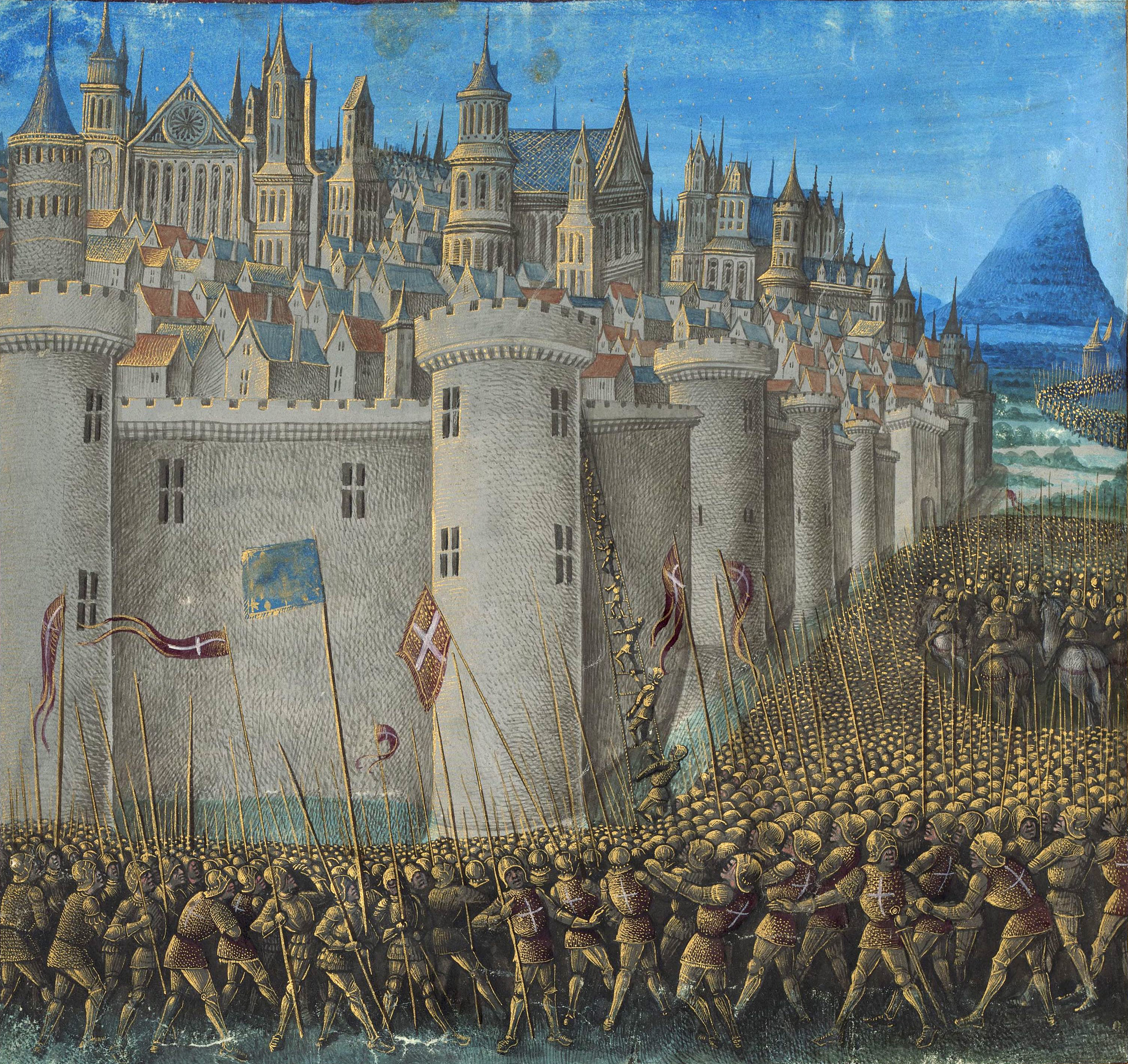
The Crusades were a series of military campaigns fought mainly between Roman Catholic Europe and Muslims. Depicted here is the Siege of Antioch from the First Crusade.

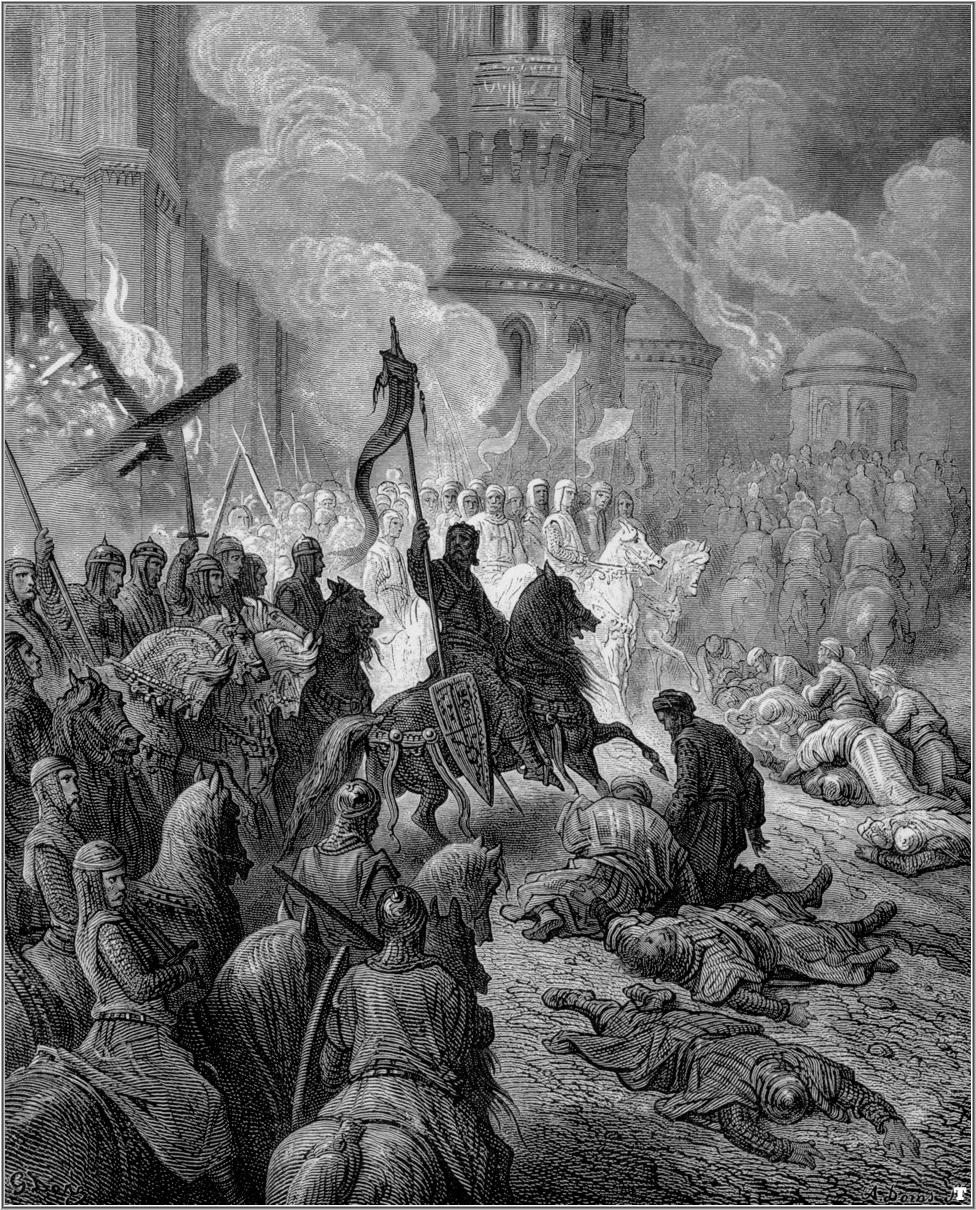
Entry of the Crusaders into Constantinople by Gustave Doré (1832–1883)

Some authors have stated that "religious" conflicts are not exclusively based on religious beliefs but should instead be seen as clashes of communities, identities, and interests that are secular-religious or at least very secular.

Some have asserted that attacks are carried out by those with very strong religious convictions such as terrorists in the context of a global religious war. Robert Pape, a political scientist who specializes in suicide terrorism argues that much of the modern Muslim suicide terrorism is secularly based. Although the causes of terrorism are complex, it may be safe to assume that terrorists are partially reassured by their religious views that their god is on their side and that it will reward them in Heaven for punishing unbelievers.

These conflicts are among the most difficult to resolve, particularly when both sides believe that God is on their side and that He has endorsed the moral righteousness of their claims. One of the most infamous quotes which is associated with religious fanaticism was uttered in 1209 during the siege of Béziers, a Crusader asked the Papal Legate Arnaud Amalric how to tell Catholics from Cathars when the city was taken, to which Amalric replied: "Caedite eos. Novit enim Dominus qui sunt eius", or "Kill them all; God will recognize his."

== Ritual violence ==
Acts of ritual violence may be committed against human and non-human victims (e.g., human sacrifice, animal sacrifice and ritual slaughter) or they may be self-inflicted (e.g., religious self-flagellation).

According to the hunting hypothesis, summarized by Walter Burkert in Homo Necans, carnivorous behavior is considered a form of violence. Burkett suggests that the anthropological phenomenon of religion grew out of rituals that were connected with hunting and the associated feelings of guilt over the violence that hunting required.

== Notable incidents ==
- Murder of Alan Berg — The defunct American white supremacist group the Order was founded by avid practitioners of Wotanism such as David Lane and Robert Jay Mathews. Lane was convicted of the 1984 murder of Jewish radio host Alan Berg.
- Church burnings — A wave of church burnings, such as during the early Norwegian black metal scene in the 1990s, has been cited as an act of neo-pagan terrorism. The arsons coincided with a resurgence in the popularity of European black metal. This genre of music featured the imagery and ideas of neo-paganism, Satanism, and nationalism. The targets were Christian churches, and up to 28 churches were targeted during this period. Popular black metal musician Varg Vikernes, a noted neo-pagan and nationalist, was convicted of three of these arsons and charged with a fourth attempt.
- Overland Park Jewish Community Center shooting — Frazier Glenn Miller Jr. shot and killed three people at a Kansas Jewish community center in 2014. Prior to becoming an Odinist, Miller Jr. was a member of the Ku Klux Klan.
- 2012 Ramu violence

== By country ==
- Religious violence in India
- Religious violence in Nigeria
- Religious violence in Pakistan

== See also ==
- Antireligion
- Antitheism
- Clerical fascism
- Fundamentalism
- Religious discrimination
- Religious fanaticism
- Religious intolerance
- Religious persecution
- Religious segregation
- Religious terrorism
- Religious war
- Sectarian violence
