= Religion and peacebuilding =

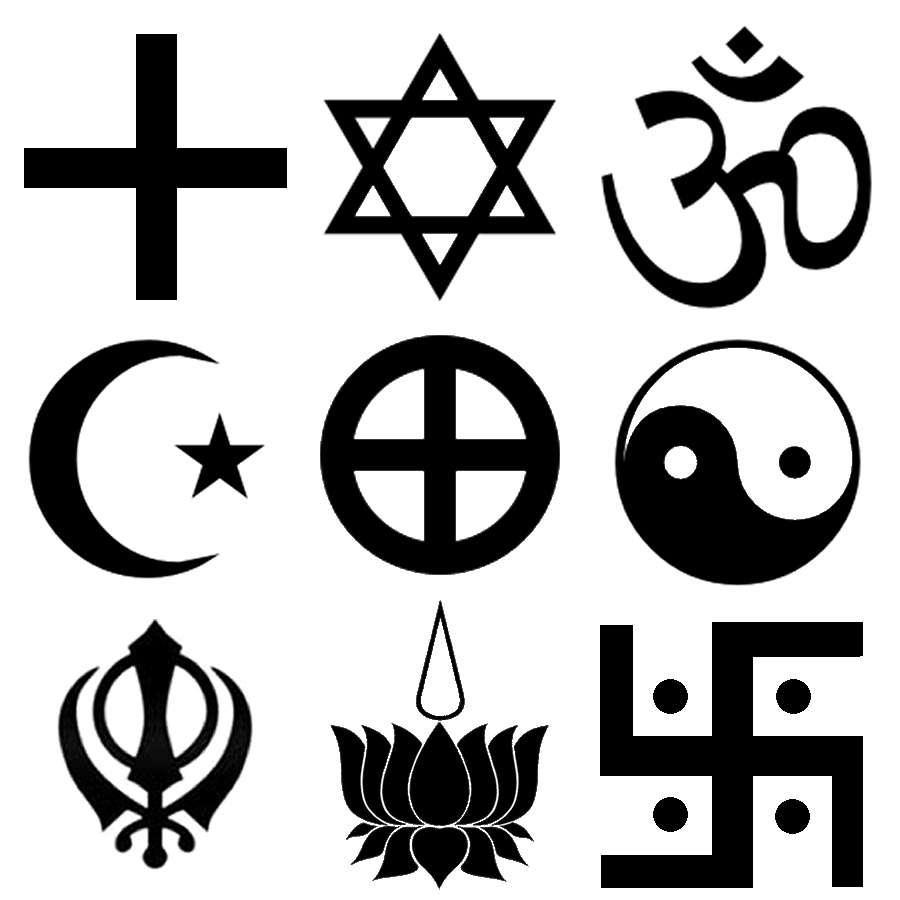
Symbols of various faiths

Religion and peacebuilding is the study of religion's role in the development of peace.

Nathan C. Funk and Christina J. Woolner categorize these approaches into three models. The first is "peace through religion alone". This proposes to attain world peace through devotion to a given religion. Opponents claim that advocates generally want to attain peace through their particular religion only and have little tolerance of other ideologies. The second model, a response to the first, is "peace without religion". Critics claim that it is overly simplistic and fails to address other causes of conflict as well as the peace potential of religion. It is also said that this model excludes the many contributions of religious people in the development of peace. Another critique claims that both approaches require bringing everyone into their own ideology.

The third and final approach is known as "peace with religion". This approach focuses on the importance of coexistence and interfaith dialogue. Gerrie ter Haar suggests that religion is neither inherently good nor bad for peace, and that its influence is undeniable. Peace with religion, then, emphasises promoting the common principles present in every major religion.

A major component of religion and peacebuilding is faith-based non-governmental organizations (NGOs). Douglas Johnston points out that faith-based NGOs offer two distinct advantages. The first is that since faith-based NGOs are very often locally based, they have immediate influence within that community. He argues that "it is important to promote indigenous ownership of conflict prevention and peacebuilding initiatives as early in the process as possible." The second advantage Johnston presents is that faith-based NGOs carry moral authority that contributes to the receptivity of negotiations and policies for peace.

== Judaism and peace building ==
=== Hebrew Bible ===
The Hebrew Bible contains many sources for religious peacebuilding. Some of which include:

- The Priestly Blessing (Numbers 6:24–26) ends with: "May God lift up his face onto you and give you peace"
- Leviticus 26:6: "And I shall place peace upon the land"
- Numbers 25:12: "Behold I give him my covenant of peace"
- Isaiah 57:19: Peace, peace to the distant and the close"
- Psalms 11:5: The LORD examines the righteous, but the wicked, those who love violence, he hates with a passion.
- Psalms 34:15: "Turn away from evil and do good; seek peace and pursue it"
- Ecclesiastes 9:17–18: "The quiet words of the wise are more to be heeded than the shouts of a ruler of fools. Wisdom is better than weapons of war, but one sinner destroys much good.
- Isaiah 11:6–9: The wolf will live with the lamb, the leopard will lie down with the goat, the calf and the lion and the yearling together;and a little child will lead them. The cow will feed with the bear, their young will lie down together, and the lion will eat straw like the ox. The infant will play near the hole of the cobra, and the young child put his hand into the viper's nest. They will neither harm nor destroy on all my holy mountain, for the earth will be full of the knowledge of the Lord as the waters cover the sea.
- Isaiah 2:4 and Micah 4:3 They will beat their swords into plowshares and their spears into pruning hooks. Nation will not take up sword against nation, nor will they train for war anymore.

== Christianity and peace building ==
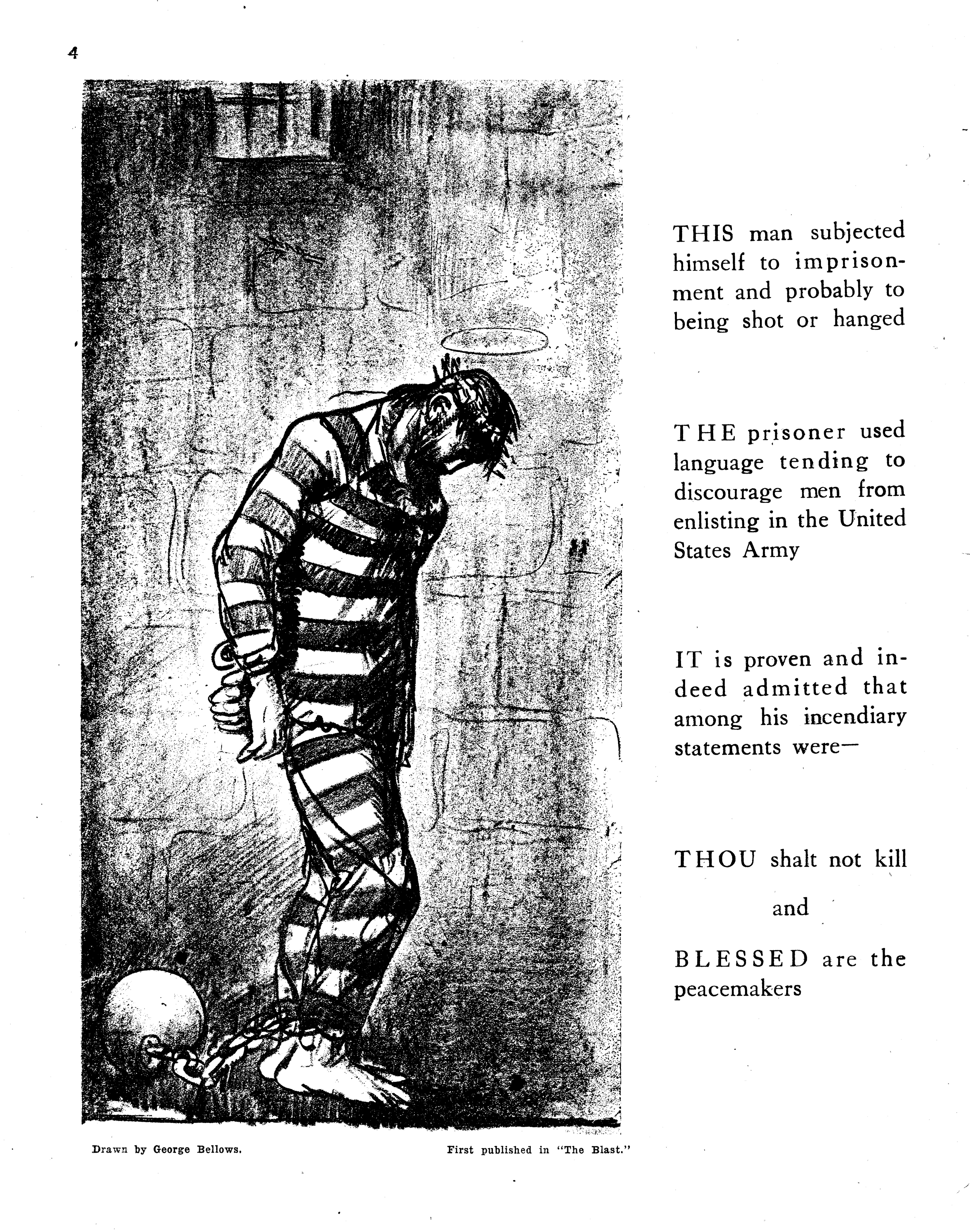
Blessed are the Peacemakers (1917) by George Bellows

=== Project Ploughshares ===
Project Ploughshares is a Canadian non-government organization concerned with the prevention of war, the disarmament of weapons, and peacebuilding. Though it is an agency of the Canadian Council of Churches and is sponsored by the nine national churches of Canada, Project Ploughshares is run by and for people of a variety of different faith backgrounds. Project Ploughshares works with various NGOs operating abroad to develop research and complete analyses of government policies. In the past, Project Ploughshares' work has included meeting with prime ministers to discuss nuclear disarmament, establishing and coordinating an agency for disarmament and security of the Horn in Africa, working with the UN and NATO on policy-making, and publishing research papers, one of which was endorsed by over 40 000 Canadians and had a serious influence over Canada's decision not to declare war on Iraq.

Project Ploughshares takes its name from Isaiah 2:4 where it is written "God shall judge between the nations, and shall decide for many peoples; and they shall beat their swords into ploughshares, and spears into pruning hooks; nation shall not lift up sword against nation; neither shall they learn war any more."

=== Pax Christi ===
Pax Christi is the "official international Catholic peace movement" as recognized by Pope Pius XII in 1952.

It was founded after World War II as reconciliary movement by French citizens including Bishop Pierre-Marie Théas of Tarbes and Lourdes. First goal was the reconciliation between France and Germany; the German branch or section later concentrated on reconciliation with Poland and initiated the foundation of the de:Maximilian-Kolbe-Werk.

Today the Pax Christi network membership is made up of 18 national sections and 115 Member Organizations working in over 50 countries, focusing on five main issues: human rights, human security, disarmament and demilitarisation, just world order, and religion and peace.

== The Baháʼí Faith and peace building ==
The Baháʼí Faith requires believers to avoid prejudice in daily life, to be friendly to people of all religions, social statuses, nationalities or various cultural traditions. At the nation's level, it calls for negotiation and dialogue between country leaders, to promote the process of world peace. For world peace, the Baháʼí Faith has the notion of "the Lesser Peace" and "the Great Peace". The previous one is considered the level of political peace, that a peace treaty is signed, and wars are eliminated; the latter refers to God's kingdom on earth, the world reaches its unity and in cooperation, all world's people uses an auxiliary language, a unified currency system, achieves economic justice, a world tribunal is available, and massive disarmament of all countries.

Bahá'u'lláh, the founder of the Baháʼí Faith, discouraged all forms of violence, including religious violence, writing that his aim was to: "quench the flame of hate and enmity" and that the "religion of God is for love and unity; make it not the cause of enmity or dissension." He warned of the dangers of religious fanaticism describing it as a "world devouring fire", prohibited holy war, and condemned the shedding of blood, the burning of books, the shunning of the followers of other religions and the extermination of communities and groups. Bahá'u'lláh promoted the concept of the oneness of the world and human beings describing the Earth as "but one country, and mankind its citizens". Bahá'u'lláh identified the elimination of disunity as a necessary pre-requisite to peace. "The well-being of mankind, its peace and security, are unattainable unless and until its unity is firmly established."

In 1985, as a contribution to the 1986 International Year of Peace, the international governing body of the Baháʼí Faith, the Universal House of Justice, released a major statement on the promotion of peace, that was distributed worldwide by the Baháʼí community. The statement sets out an analysis and strategy for creation of a more peaceful world. It identifies the following barriers to peace: racism, economic injustice, uncontrolled nationalism, religious strife, inequality between man and women, an absence of universal education, and the need for an international auxiliary language. The statement concludes with a call for establishment of the "oneness of humanity", a call which implies "no less than the reconstruction and the demilitarization of the whole civilized world—a world organically unified in all the essential aspects of its life, its political machinery, its spiritual aspiration, its trade and finance, its script and language, and yet infinite in the diversity of the national characteristics of its federated units."

== Buddhism and peace building ==
=== Buddhist scripture ===
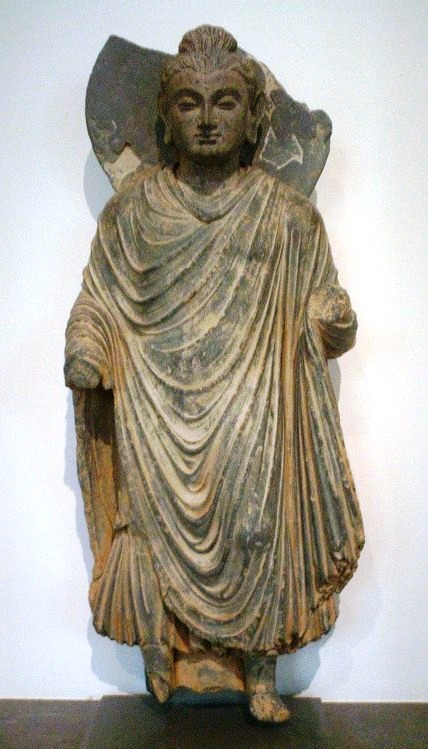
Hatred does not cease by hatred, but only by love. This is the eternal rule.

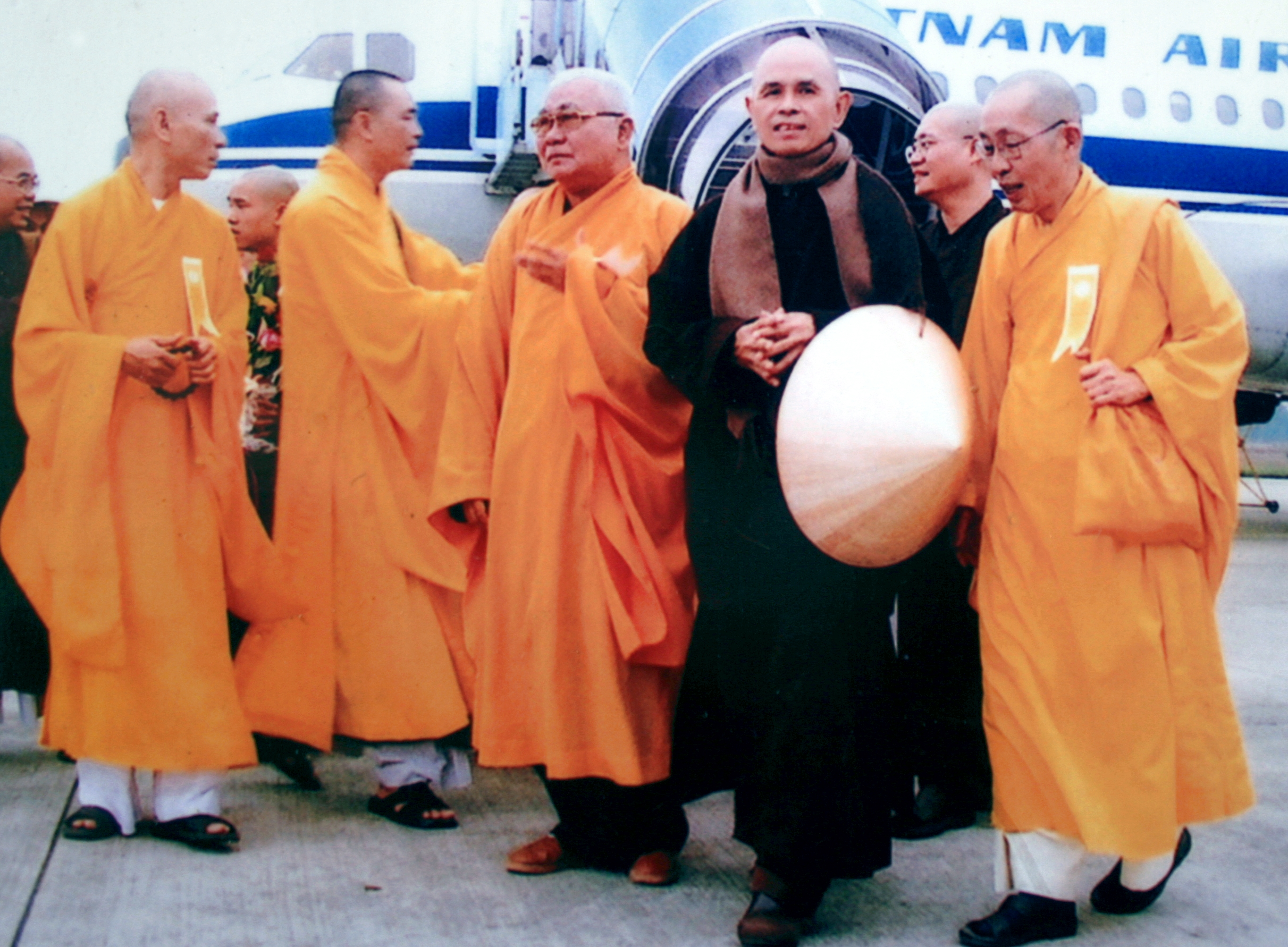
Nhat Hanh at Hue City airport on his 2007 trip to Vietnam (aged 80)

=== Engaged Buddhism ===
Engaged Buddhism is a term coined in the 1960s by Vietnamese monk Thich Nhat Hanh to describe a more socially active form of Buddhism. Originating during the Indochina Wars with Nhat Hanh and the Unified Buddhist Church, adherents of Engaged Buddhism became participants in the war, not against the Americans or the Vietnamese, but against the violence itself, which they saw as unnecessary. They attempted to draw attention to the injustices of the war by placing themselves directly between the lines of battle and even engaging in self immolation.

Engaged Buddhism represents a socially aware non-violent movement within the larger Buddhist community. Inspired by the Buddhist tradition of the Peace Wheel and the teachings of non-violence of Siddhartha Gautama, Engaged Buddhism has since spread to other conflicts in other countries, with groups in Tibet, struggling for self-determination; in Burma and Cambodia, advocating for human rights; in Sri Lanka, promoting the Sarvodaya Shramadana Movement; and in India, working with untouchables. The group has also since opened up churches in the Western world.

== Islam and peace building ==
The Quran contains many sources for religious peace building. Some of which include:

- "O believers! Obey Allah and obey the Messenger and those in authority among you. Should you disagree on anything, then refer it to Allah and His Messenger, if you ˹truly˺ believe in Allah and the Last Day. This is the best and fairest resolution." (Surah an-Nisa 59:4)
- "And hold firmly together to the rope of Allah and do not be divided. Remember Allah’s favour upon you when you were enemies, then He united your hearts, so you—by His grace—became brothers. And you were at the brink of a fiery pit and He saved you from it. This is how Allah makes His revelations clear to you, so that you may be ˹rightly˺ guided." (Surah Ali Imran 3:103)
- "Let there be a group among you who call ˹others˺ to goodness, encourage what is good, and forbid what is evil—it is they who will be successful." (Surah Ali Imran 3:104)

=== Jihad ===
Jihad (Islamic holy war) can be a controversial concept in juxtaposition to the Quran’s depiction and promotion of peace. Scholars like Fazlur Rahman argue that “jihad becomes an absolute necessity” because otherwise, it is impossible to enact the “ideological world order” that the Quran promotes, which is designed to promote peace and harmony among all people, redistribute wealth, and uplift those who are oppressed. Other scholars argue that “the peaceful nature of Islam” only promotes that “Muslims…wage war against enemies only when Islam is under attack,” similar to instances like those that preceded the Treaty of Hudaybiyyah," and that "the text still commands believers to “behave kindly towards those among enemies who have not fought them,” demonstrating that the Quran’s main aim, even in the presence of war, is to maintain peace.

- "And if two groups of believers fight each other, then make peace between them. But if one of them transgresses against the other, then fight against the transgressing group until they ˹are willing to˺ submit to the rule of Allah. If they do so, then make peace between both ˹groups˺ in all fairness and act justly. Surely Allah loves those who uphold justice." (Surah al-Hujurat 49:9)

=== Islam in Peace Documents ===
There are many examples of Muslim faith leaders, religious scholars, and religious organizations taking part in peacemaking/treaty making processes, whether they operate as diplomatic negotiators or mediating parties that provide space for discussion, disagreement, and conciliation. These agreements often use the Quran and Islam to promote harmony and create a shared vocabulary of peace. These agreements largely arise in the Middle East and North Africa, particularly from Yemen, Syria, Sudan, and Tunisia.

Notable examples include:

- the Doha Agreement (2020), where NATO negotiators leveraged the political influence of local Pakistani ulemas with specialized knowledge in Islamic law and theology, derived from the Quran to create language to counteract the Taliban's principle of justified jihad.
- the “Statement on Security in the Governorate of Ibb” (Yemen, 2015), in which a group of imams and preachers called for an end to Houthi-related violence in the government of Ibb, invoking Surah an-Nisa 4:93.
- Jabhat Fatah al-Sham's peace statement (Syria, 2016/2018), invoking Surah al-Hujurat 49:9 and Surah an-Nisa 59:4 to call for peace and settelement between two warring factions, Jund al-Aqsa and Ahrar al-Sham.
- the "Convention for Fraternity and Peaceful Co-existence between Messiriya Tribes, (Ajaira), and the Denka of Abyei" (Sudan, 2001) states that “the meeting ratified the recommendations from both conferences… acting on God’s words, [from the holy Quran].”
- "The Reconciliation Conference between the Misseriyya Tribes; the Awlad Hayban and Awlad Serur and al-Metanin," (Sudan, 2013) broadly cites Surah Al-Imran and the “great truth of Allah,” for peace.
- in the "Dialogue for Comprehensive De-escalation and to Bring Peace to the Nafusa Mountains Final Communique" (Tunisia, 2015), the “Initiative to Stop the Ongoing Fighting between Tahrir al-Sham and Harakat Ahrar al-Sham al-Islamiyya” (Syria, 2017), and the “Statement of Council of the Tebu Tribes to Coordinate and End the Crisis in Sabha” (2018), all documents preface their text with “in the name of God, the Compassionate and the Merciful.”

== See also ==
- Ahimsa
- Conscientious objector
- Pacifism § Religious attitudes
  - Christian pacifism
  - Pacifism in Islam
- Judaism and peace
- Interfaith dialogue
- Islam and humanity
- Morality in Islam
- Pentecostals & Charismatics for Peace & Justice
- Religion
- Nontheistic religion
- Religious naturalism
- Testimony of peace
- World peace
