= Israel Hess =

Israel Hess (Hebrew: ישראל הס; April 26, 1935 – September 27, 1997) was an Israeli rabbi.

On February 26, 1980, Bat Kol, the student publication of Bar-Ilan University, published an article by Hess titled "Genocide: A Commandment of the Torah" (also translated as "The Mitzvah of Genocide in the Torah") in which, according to Karen Armstrong, he argued that the Palestinians "deserved the same fate as the Amalekites". The article is an explanation of the commandment in Deuteronomy 25:17 to "obliterate the memory of Amalek". According to Eric Yoffie, Hess wrote that this "requires the killing of babes and sucklings, and forbids the showing of mercy". According to David Hirst, Hess wrote that "the day will come when we shall all be called upon to wage this war for the annihilation of Amalek" in order to ensure "racial purity" and because of "the antagonism between Israel and Amalek as an expression of the antagonism between light and darkness, the pure and the unclean". In response to the article, the president of Bar-Ilan Rabbi Emanuel Rackman, dismissed Hess from his position at the school.

In 2004, Shulamit Aloni, writing in Haaretz, said of Hess' article, "It's no coincidence that in the settlements the Palestinians are called 'Amalek', and the intention is obvious to everyone".
