= Voluntary war =

One of three types of war in Jewish law

In Jewish tradition, voluntary war (Hebrew: מלחמת הרשות; milḥemet ha-reshūt), sometimes called a discretionary war, optional war, a non-obligatory war, or a war of free choice, refers to a war that is waged of free choice by Israel, only at such a time when the people of Israel are settled in their ancestral homeland. It is contrasted with the mandatory war.

== History ==
The Hebrew Bible assumes war as inevitable when it says, "When you go out to war against your enemies" (Deut. 20:1). It has often been cited and used as the constitutional basis for traditional laws of conquest, where the defeated are either killed or enslaved. Traditional Jewish law recognizes as a category of permissible war, wars undertaken in order "to diminish the heathens so that they shall not march against them." The earliest age given in the Hebrew Bible for military conscript is age twenty. Old men (aged 60), as well as the lame and the blind, are exempt from military service.

King David waged a voluntary war against the Moabites and the Ammonites (2 Samuel 8 and 1 Chronicles 19), and also against the inhabitants of Aram Zobah. In the case of Moab and Ammon, some commentaries hold these to be voluntary wars spurred-on by revenge, because they had attacked Israel.

In 164 BCE, Mattathias, the progenitor of the Hasmonean dynasty, made it a law that it was permissible for Jews to defend themselves on Shabbat, even if it meant desecrating the Sabbath, when attacked by their enemies. His son, Judas Maccabeus, when trying to curtail the advances of the enemy Syrian troops who had invaded the country, put into practice the teachings of Moses, as prescribed in the 'ancient order of battle' (Deut. 20:1–ff.), and dismissed from his army those men who had recently been married to a wife.

== Characteristics ==
The great rabbis and sages of Israel distinguish between a voluntary war and a mandatory war. A voluntary war is not fought for national survival, but rather for personal ambitions of the country's ruler. This might include personal enmity with another state, or a desire to show the country's military prowess as a means to deter potential aggressors, or to expand the territorial domain of the country. A voluntary war may only be waged by authorization of the greater Sanhedrin, composed of seventy-one judges, presumably in order to impose a religious and moral check on reckless warfare. Other authorities also permit a king to initiate a war, since a king is the supreme commander of the army. (Note: A story is relayed in the Babylonian Talmud (Sanhedrin 16a; Berakhot 3b) about King David who was accosted by the Sages of Israel who said to him, "Your people, Israel, are in need of making a living." He replied to them that they should make a living from one another, by means of trade. They then replied to him, "A trifling amount hardly satisfies the lion, neither does a cistern fill-up by its ḥūliyya" (i.e. the oozing of rain water into the small hole that is drilled in the slab of stone laid over the mouth of a cistern. – Maim.). Meaning, the water in a cistern must be channeled into the cistern from canals and sluices brought from afar, or from rain water that drains from the rooftop. To this answer, the king replied that they should go forth and make war against their enemies in the surrounding districts and to take from them the things that they stand in need of. They then sought sage advice and counsel from Ahitophel, including from the Sanhedrin, and enquired of the Urim and Thummim, as to how and when this was to be accomplished.) In other respects, a voluntary war is to be distinguished from a religious war, insofar that a religious war concerns the conquest of the land of Canaan by Joshua. (Note: Rabbi Judah bar Ilai somewhat differed here, as, according to him, even if the nation of Israel were to go out against a nation with whom there was only enmity, but no actual war, he still called such a war a "religious war" (Heb. milchemet mitzvah) and that, technically, when a Jewish soldier is occupied in performing one religious duty, he is exempt from performing other religious duties.)

For all practical purposes, a voluntary war can be described as an offensive war, but in the absence of either a monarchy or the Sanhedrin such a war is lacking in its powers and in its authority to be waged, and there is no man who can forcibly be taken to join the war effort. Moreover, a voluntary war can only be waged by Israel when the people are settled in the Land of Israel. Such laws do not apply to Jews serving in foreign armies.

== Rules of engagement ==
The early Sages of Israel mitigated the laws of armed conflict. In the case of a voluntary war, it was bound by certain legal constraints and restrictions (jus in bello), inasmuch as it was prohibited by halakha to wage a voluntary war on the Sabbath day, unless it were to save life. Moreover, according to the Babylonian Talmud, Shabbat 19a, in a war waged of free choice, whenever Israel lays siege to a city belonging to the enemy, the siege must be initiated at least three days before the start of the Sabbath, (Note: Several reasons are cited for initiating a siege three days in advance of the Sabbath. According to rabbis Isaac Alfasi (Shabbat 19a) and Maimonides (Hil. Shabbat 30:13), this was to enable the soldiers to have sufficient time to prepare themselves for the delight associated with the Sabbath day, and whose minds would not be at ease had they embarked on a siege in less time. According to a 14th-century Bible exegete, this is simply a biblical decree, learnt from where it says (Deut. 20:19) "When you shall lay siege to a city a long time," the words "a long time" being literally in Hebrew "many days" (ימים רבים). Since the smallest numerical value for anything written in the plural tense, such as in the word "days," is two, and since the verse adds thereto "many", the sense implied here is at least three days. Zechariah ha-Levi explains that it is permitted unto soldiers to lay siege to a city on Sunday, Monday and Tuesday, since these days belong to the previous Sabbath, whereas Wednesday, Thursday and Friday belong to the upcoming Sabbath, and that if the soldiers were to lay siege to a city on these days it is as though they had purposely put themselves in danger on condition to save themselves on the Sabbath day, knowing that the saving of life takes precedence over the Sabbath.) and it is incumbent upon Israel to offer the besieged conditions of capitulation (peace), such as the guarantee of their lives being spared if they agree to be put under tribute and servitude to the Jewish nation, and on condition that they agree to observe the seven basic commandments given to the sons of Noah. For this, embassages and heralds are sent to representatives of those persons who make themselves voluntary enemies to the nation of Israel in order to extend conditions of peace. Once the siege has begun, war is made against the besieged city and continues thereafter, day after day, even on the Sabbath day itself, as it says: "until it be subdued" (Deut. 20:20).

In a voluntary war, not all able-bodied men are conscripted to fight, as there are certain exemptions outlined explicitly in the Torah, namely:

1. 'the one who built a house and did not dwell in it a year's time' (Note: One of the reasons stated for this exemption is that, with newly gained possessions, they would fight in a cowardly manner, out of an inordinate love of life, in order to enjoy those blessings. This rule also applies to the man who built a new warehouse, cowshed, woodshed or hayshed. It is the same whether he had obtained the house through legal means, but had not dwelt in it, or he had inherited the house, but had not dwelt in it.)
2. he that 'planted a vineyard and did not partake of its fruit'
3. the one who has 'betrothed a wife and has yet to perform his marital duty' on her.
4. the one who is 'fearful and faint-hearted'.
5. the one whose conscience bothers him because of having committed certain sins.

Formerly, in Jewish halachic law, it was incumbent upon a priest descended from Aaron's lineage and who had been specifically tasked with the vetting process to officiate over the conscription of new recruits (משוח מלחמה; the anointed for battle), to announce unto the people the legal requirements and to screen those who were exempt from military service, while admonishing and encouraging all others, in the Hebrew language, to fight valiantly. This priest was to be anointed with the holy anointing oil. He was assigned Levite officers who were themselves priests to assist him in conveying these messages in an audible voice to the people, immediately prior to engaging in battle. Afterwards, captains were appointed over the soldiers to conduct the war, and to take-up positions at the fore of the battle, as well as at the rearward of military operations.

Soldiers are prohibited from defecating in the open field, in such a way that their waste remains visible, but must carry with them a trowel-like implement needed to dig a hole in a pre-designated place and to cover-up their excreta after relieving themselves. If, in the course of the voluntary war, soldiers were recalled from active duty (although they did not fall under the category of those who had newly wedded a wife, neither those who had built a new house, nor planted a vineyard), they would be commissioned by the acting officers to fix the public roads, to provide food and water on the war behalf, in addition to being assessed for the town tax. (Note: Cf. Mishnah Sotah 8:2. An example of such person is a man who, although initially not qualified for war exemption, was asked to leave the battle due to the fact that, in the course of the war, his brother had died childless and who then became eligible to marry his deceased brother's widow through the act of levirate marriage.) Such duties and responsibilities do not apply to the man who is newly wedded, or who has built a new house or planted a vineyard, as he is exempt from all these. (Note: Cf. Mishnah Sotah 8:4)

=== Laws relating to the siege of cities ===
In Jewish halachic law, it is forbidden to lay siege to a city by completely closing-off the city on all four sides. Rather, a besieged city must be encompassed only on its three sides, to enable those who wish to escape to escape. Moreover, it is prohibited under Jewish law to cut down the fruit trees of a besieged city while maintaining the siege, in order to punish the people of the besieged city (Deuteronomy 20:19-20), although it is permitted to cut-down trees that do not bear fruit, to be used in the siege. Neither is it permissible for the warring party that lays siege to a city to prevent from its inhabitants water that is being channeled into the city via an aqueduct. In those cities where the besieged people refuse to capitulate and to make peace with Israel, the Torah sanctions the killing of all males of warring age in that city, but the women, small children and livestock are to be taken as legal plunder.

=== Special privileges ===
Conscripted soldiers taking part in the voluntary war effort have been given special privileges to make fighting easier for them, or else to keep them blameless:

1. If, in the course of the war, a Jewish man sees a beautiful gentile woman among the captives, whether she is a single woman or a woman married to another man, and his passions are aroused by her beauty and he desires to lay with her carnally (being unable to control his passions), he may conscionably do so, without guilt, when his intent is to marry her, since the Torah has condoned his actions during the time of warfare. (Note: He is permitted to forcibly have marital relations with a beautiful gentile woman who had been made a prisoner of war. The Talmud (Kiddushin 21b) calls this act a concession to man's evil inclination. Even so, when she is brought to his house, he must shave her head and allow her fingernails to grow out (Note: "must allow her fingernails to grow out," this interpretation follows the Aramaic Targum on Deuteronomy 21:12, Maimonides (Hil. Melekhim 8:1–3), Rashi's commentary on Deuteronomy 21:12, as well as the author of Sefer ha-Chinuch (§ 532), unlike the popular English translations for the same verse. Nachmanides, in his commentary on Deuteronomy 21:12, mentions that the interpretation is disputed, some rabbis (Sifra) holding that the sense is for her to pare her fingernails. Cf. Talmud, Yebamot 48a.) without cropping them and separate himself from her for one-month during her time of mourning, in order to be dissuaded from consummating a marriage with her. If, after all has been done, he still desires to take the woman as his wife, he may do so, on condition that she agrees to adopt the Jewish religion and is immersed in a ritual bath. The Law, moreover, enjoins that female captives who were forced to cohabit with their victors and who do not wish to convert to Judaism should not be sold as slaves.)
2. Soldiers taking part in the war effort are permitted to purloin any dry wood for their personal use. (Note: The authority of a Jewish Court to permit soldiers during battle to purloin another person's woodpile is derived from the laws of Hefker beth-din hefker.)
3. Soldiers taking part in the war effort, in the event of food scarcity, are permitted to eat of animals that have been improperly butchered, and even to feast on the 'necks of swine' (Hagigah 17a).
4. Soldiers taking part in the war effort are permitted to return to their places with their weapons in hand, even on a Sabbath day.
5. Soldiers taking part in the war effort are exempt from hand washing immediately prior to eating bread, since this would be an encumbrance upon them.
6. Soldiers taking part in the war effort are permitted to eat of fruits and vegetables that have the status of Demai-produce.
7. Soldiers taking part in the war effort are exempt from observing the laws governing the extension of courtyards (ʻerūvei ḥaṣerot) on the Sabbath day (Eruvin 17a–b).
8. A soldier killed in battle may be buried in the place where he had fallen, even if his family members were known and they could retrieve the body and take it to their private family's burial plot (Eruvin 17a–b).

=== Jews who are conscripted in non-Jewish armies ===
According to the Bayit Chadash, notwithstanding the lack of conditions which would otherwise make a voluntary war valid today, Jewish men may still find themselves serving as soldiers in non-Jewish armies among the nations of the world. In which case, Jewish soldiers who are called to lay siege to a city, unlike their regular non-Jewish unit or regiment, are still obligated to abide by the strictures outlined in rabbinic writings and must embark on the siege with at least three days in advance of the Sabbath-day. Moreover, if there was a case whereby Jews and Gentiles had been taken captive by enemy forces, it is permissible for Jewish soldiers serving in foreign armies to set-out to rescue the captives, even on a Sabbath-day, since the saving of Jewish life takes precedence over the Sabbath-day, and is withal tantamount to a religious war.

== See also ==
- Armed conflict
- Declaration of war
- Hegemony
- Judaism and warfare
- Jus ad bellum
- Just war theory
- Law of war
- Laws of armed conflict
- Military justice

== Bibliography ==
- Adani, David (1983). Rabinowitz, Zvi Meir (ed.). Midrash Haggadol on the Pentateuch (Numbers) (in Hebrew). Vol. 4. Jerusalem: Mossad Harav Kook. OCLC 706057959.
- Bar-Sheshet, Isaac (1993). David Metsger (ed.). Questions & Responsa of Rabbi Isaac Bar-Sheshet (Sheʼelot u-teshuvot) (in Hebrew). Vol. 1. Jerusalem: Mekhon Or ha-mizraḥ, Mekhon Yerushalayim. pp. 92-93 (responsum no. 101). OCLC 28764985.
- Bleich, J.D. (1983). "Preemptive War in Jewish Law". Tradition: A Journal of Orthodox Jewish Thought. 21 (1). Rabbinical Council of America (RCA): 3–41. JSTOR 23259450.
- Danby, H., ed. (1977), The Mishnah, Oxford: Oxford University Press, ISBN 0-19-815402-X
- Eisenstein, Judah D. (1970). A Digest of Jewish Laws and Customs - in Alphabetical Order (Ozar Dinim u-Minhagim) (in Hebrew). Tel-Aviv. pp. 228–229 (s.v. מלחמה). OCLC 54817857. (reprinted from 1922 and 1938 editions of the Hebrew Publishing Co., New York)
- Elgavish, David (2008). "Justification for War in the ancient Near-East and the Bible". In Joseph Fleishman (ed.). The Bar-Ilan Conference volume: Jewish Law Association Studies 18 (2006). Liverpool: Jewish Law Association (14th International Congress). ISBN 9781906731007., ISBN 9781906731014
- Ginsburger, Moses, ed. (1903). Pseudo-Jonathan (Thargum Jonathan ben Usiël zum Pentateuch) (in Hebrew). Berlin: S. Calvary & Co. OCLC 123313256. (reprinted in Jerusalem 1974)
- Grunblatt, Joseph (1968). "Violence and Some Aspects of the Judaic Tradition". Tradition: A Journal of Orthodox Jewish Thought. 10 (2). Rabbinical Council of America (RCA): 42–47. JSTOR 23256251.
- HaLevi, Aharon (1958). Sefer ha-Chinuch on the 613 biblical commandments (in Hebrew). Jerusalem: Eshkol. OCLC 762447043.
- Josephus (1981). Josephus Complete Works. Translated by William Whiston. Grand Rapids, Michigan: Kregel Publications. ISBN 0-8254-2951-X.
- Kehati, P., ed. (1977). Mishnayot Mevu'arot (משניות מבוארות) (in Hebrew). Vol. 8 (9 ed.). Jerusalem: Heikhal Shelomo. OCLC 762445815.
- Kimelman, Reuven (2023). "Judaism and the Ethics of War". The Cambridge Companion to Religion and War. pp. 215–240. doi:10.1017/9781108884075.013. ISBN 978-1-108-88407-5.
- Kuzmarov, Betina (2012). ""Recapturing" the "Other": Jewish Laws of War and International Law". Journal of Law and Religion. 28 (1). Cambridge University Press: 47–65. doi:10.1017/S0748081400000230. JSTOR 23645226.
- Lehman, Menashe Raphael (1988). "A beautiful woman and other laws in the Temple scroll (אשת יפת-תואר והלכות אחרות במגילת המקדש)". Beit Mikra: Journal for the Study of the Bible and Its World (in Hebrew). 33 (3). Bialik Institute, Jerusalem: 313–316. JSTOR 23505022.
- Maimonides (1963). Mishnah, with Maimonides' Commentary (in Hebrew). Vol. 1. Translated by Yosef Qafih. Jerusalem: Mossad Harav Kook. OCLC 233308346.
- Maimonides (2016). Mishneh Torah by Moses Maimonides (Book of Shoftim) (in Hebrew). Vol. 14. Jerusalem; Bnei Brak: Shabse Frankel. OCLC 989980005.
- Maimonides (2016b). Mishneh Torah by Moses Maimonides (Book of Zemanim) (in Hebrew). Vol. 3 (aleph). Jerusalem; Bnei Brak: Shabse Frankel. OCLC 989980005.
- Meiri (2006). Daniel Bitton (ed.). Beit HaBechirah (Chiddushei ha-Meiri) (in Hebrew). Vol. 7. Jerusalem: Hamaor Institute. OCLC 181631040.
- Meiri (2006a). Daniel Bitton (ed.). Beit HaBechirah (Chiddushei ha-Meiri) (in Hebrew). Vol. 5. Jerusalem: Hamaor Institute. OCLC 181631040.
- Nahmanides, Moses (1993). Nahmanides' Commentary on the Torah (in Hebrew). Vol. 2. Jerusalem: A. Blum. OCLC 233074002.
- Nethanel ben Isaiah (1983). Sefer Me'or ha-Afelah (in Hebrew). Translated by Yosef Qafih. Kiryat Ono: Mechon Moshe. OCLC 970925649.
- Newman, Jeffrey (1998). "War as a Challenge to our Traditions: A Jewish Response". European Judaism: A Journal for the New Europe. 31 (1). Judaism, Christianity and Islam: Celebrating the 25th Anniversary of the J-C-M Student Conference, Bendorf: 26–34. JSTOR 43740572.
- Sirkis, J. (2005). "Commentary of Bayit Chadash". Arbaa Turim Hashalem (Orach Chayim) (in Hebrew). Tel Aviv: Mekhon Yerushalayim. p. 34 (Orach Chayim §249:1). OCLC 1039272787.
- Soloveichik, Aaron (1982). "Waging War on Shabbat". Tradition: A Journal of Orthodox Jewish Thought. 20 (3). Rabbinical Council of America (RCA): 179–187. JSTOR 23260746.
- Tosephta (1970). M.S. Zuckermandel (ed.). Tosephta - Based on the Erfut and Vienna Codices (in Hebrew). Jerusalem: Wahrmann Books. OCLC 13717538. (first printed in Berlin 1899)
- Zechariah ha-Rofé (1992). Havatselet, Me'ir (ed.). Midrash ha-Ḥefez (in Hebrew). Vol. 2. Jerusalem: Mossad Harav Kook. OCLC 23773577.
