= Abraham Gabishon =

Jewish physician and actor

Abraham ben Jacob Gabishon (Hebrew: אברהם גבישון; died 1605) was a Jewish physician and scholar.

== Biography ==
Gabishon was of Sephardic descent, tracing his family origins to Granada. He began practicing medicine in Algiers during the Ottoman rule in 1574, where he acquired a large medical practice.

Gabishon was the author of a commentary on the Book of Proverbs titled ‘Omer ha-Shikḥah ("Sheaf of Forgetfulness"), in which he references Meiri and Levi ben Gershon. Well versed in Arabic literature, Gabishon often cites Arabic proverbs which elucidate the biblical text. Appended to ‘Omer ha-Shikḥah are several didactic poems authored by Gabishon, accompanied by annotations written by his son, Jacob, and additional poems by his grandson, also named Abraham.

He died in Tlemcen in 1605.

== Publications ==
- Gabishon, Abraham (1748). 'Omer ha-Shikḥah (in Hebrew). Livorno.
