= Beautiful captive woman =

Biblical concept

Beautiful captive woman (Hebrew: אשת יפת תואר, romanized: ʾēšet̲ yəp̄at̲ toʾar) is a term used in the Hebrew Bible for a female prisoner of war. Deuteronomy 21:10–14 affirms the right of an Israelite soldier to have sexual intercourse with and to marry such a prisoner providing he follows the prescribed regulations.

While some modern scholars criticize the law for legitimizing forms of rape or servitude, other modern scholars as well as rabbinic sources argue that it appears intended to minimize the abuse which women would almost inevitably suffer as a result of conquest.

== Hebrew Bible ==
Deuteronomy 21:10–14 states that Moses said:

When you go forth to battle against your enemies, and the LORD your God delivers them into your hands, and you carry them away captive, and you see among the captives a beautiful woman, and you desire her, and would take her to you as wife; then you shall bring her home to your house; and she shall shave her head, and pare her nails; and she shall remove the garment of her captivity from off her, and shall remain in your house, and bewail her father and her mother a full month; and after that you may go in to her, and be her husband, and she shall be your wife. And it shall be, if you have no delight in her, then you shall let her go where she will; but you shall not sell her at all for money; you shall not deal with her as a slave, because you have humbled her.

== Rabbinic interpretation ==
=== Morality ===
The Talmud calls this law a concession to man's evil inclination, using the analogy "Better that Jews eat the meat of animals that were ritually slaughtered just before dying a natural death [an act frowned upon but not outright forbidden] rather than eat the meat of animals not ritually slaughtered at all." That is to say, a soldier's sexual instinct is strong enough that if there were no permitted way to have a sexual relationship with a female captive, he would do so nonetheless.

Although the rabbis saw the Torah's procedure as preferable to unrestricted abuse of captives, they attempted to discourage the Torah's procedure as well. Rabbis referred to following the Torah's procedure, despite its nominal legality, as "a sin which leads to another sin" (aveirah goreret aveirah), and predicted that one who takes such a wife will eventually come to hate her, and a son born of their relationship will be a wayward and rebellious son (Hebrew: בן סורר ומורה, Deut 21:18–21.). As an example of such an unfortunate end, the Talmud states that King David took in marriage a 'beautiful captive woman', from whom were born his son Absalom and daughter Tamar. Similarly, according to some rabbinic interpretations, the details of the law were intended to dissuade the captor from any sexual relationship: for example, cutting the captive's hair and cutting her fingernails were interpreted as making her temporarily ugly to dissuade the captor from wanting her.

=== Procedures ===
Later Jewish commentators were divided in their understandings of the details of the law. These interpretations generally assign one of three purposes to the details:

- To care for the captive, allowing her to mourn her former life, and providing her with dignity as a proper wife rather than as a slave.
- To purify the captive from her idolatrous past, as a preparation for conversion to Judaism.
- To make the captive look temporarily unattractive, so as to deter the man from wanting to marry her.

These differences are reflected in their interpretations of some of the law's details:

- The mourning period allows the captive to express the natural feelings she would have upon losing her old family. Alternatively, the intention is that the soldier be deterred from marrying, because he will be constantly confronted with an unattractive crying woman, or because they live separately while she mourns.
- The actions to be taken with the captive's hair and fingernails have been understood in different ways: either shaving the hair to make it unattractive or cutting it to make it attractive; either paring the fingernails or requiring them to grow long (either of which can be understood as more or less attractive). Consistent with these understandings, the actions have been interpreted as expressions of mourning, or as making her unattractive to discourage marriage, or as giving her a dignified appearance to emphasize her status as a future wife and not a slave.
- Commentators suggest that female captives would either typically be captured while wearing ugly clothes or rags (in which case, the requirement to change her clothes meant giving her more dignified clothes) or else while wearing beautiful clothes (in which case, her clothes should be changed to less attractive ones to decrease the soldier's attraction). Alternatively, changing her clothes represents a separation from the idolatry she practiced while wearing them.

If, after all has been done, he still desires to take the woman as his wife, he may do so, on condition that she agrees to adopt the Jewish religion and is immersed in a mikveh. If she does not wish to convert to Judaism, she must be sent free and not sold as a slave.

Rabbinic commentaries discuss two possible instances of rape between the soldier and the captive woman: "first intercourse", which would be rape of the woman on the battlefield, and "second intercourse" once the two are married after the sheloshim (30 days of mourning). According to one opinion, "first intercourse" is forbidden, and the couple may only have sex once married. According to the alternative opinion, "first intercourse" is permitted, and the soldier may rape the captive woman a single time during war if he intends to marry her later. The 13th-century Sefer ha-Chinuch summed up the disagreement as follows:

Some commentaries said that permission to have first intercourse is while she is still non-Jewish, and their words seem likely because the permission is due to the strength of the evil inclination [i.e. allowing sex only after a 30-day waiting period would not sufficiently entice the soldier not to commit forbidden sex]. But some [commentaries] said that she is not permitted at all until after all the actions we have mentioned, and thus appears the simple meaning of scripture." Even according to the opinion that "first intercourse" is permitted, the soldier must then desist from such acts until the Biblical procedures have been carried out and the two are legally married.

In one analysis, after taking the woman captive, the soldier must wait at least three months before consummating the marriage, as this time is necessary to determine whether she was pregnant from her former husband.

=== Eligibility ===
According to the Talmud, the laws apply only to Israelite soldiers, not gentile soldiers; this is a consequence of the ruling that Gentile nations are not authorized to wage wars of conquest.

The law was limited to soldiers in a voluntary war, at a time when the people of Israel dwell in their own land and when the Sanhedrin is in authority. It was only allowed during the time of war and with a captive woman, not with other non-Jewish women. The law applied whether the captive woman was single or married, whether she was a virgin or not, and whether she was objectively beautiful or simply desirable to her captor.

According to the amora Samuel ben Nahman, this rule was only permitted during the first seven years of the conquest of Canaan. Other sources implicitly reject his opinion, by speaking of King David as having performed the laws governing a "beautiful captive woman". Johanan bar Nappaha held that these laws did not apply during the first fourteen years of conquest and division of the land, but only applied afterwards.

Rabbinic Judaism discusses the special case of a kohen (priest), as they are forbidden to marry a convert. Of those who hold that "first intercourse" is permitted in general, all permit it to a kohen. Opinions are divided over whether the priest and captive might marry; Maimonides prohibits marriage.

== Modern views ==
Harold C. Washington cites Deuteronomy 21:10–14 as an example of how the Bible condones acts of sexual violence which are committed by Israelites; they were taking advantage of women who, as war captives, had no recourse or means of self defense. Philosopher Jay Newman writes, "The evil inherent in slavery itself—sexual or otherwise—is not conveyed".

M. I. Rey argues that the passage is an endorsement of sexual slavery and genocidal rape, the women were considered war trophies, and their captors had no qualms which would have prevented them from engaging in acts of sexual violence.

According to scholar Shira Weiss, "the biblical command may have been an attempt to counter the wanton rape of women common during times of war in the Bible... With the acknowledgment that deeply rooted social practices cannot likely be completely eradicated, the Bible attempts to limit them as much as possible". Similarly, Alexander Rofé concludes that “this humane ruling reflects a universal concern with limiting the soldiers’ unbridled brutality and demonstrates consideration for the feeling of captives".

Some scholars assert that the purpose of the law was to provide a mechanism by which an Israelite man could marry a woman when the normal mechanism - negotiation with the woman's guardian - was impossible as the guardian had been killed.

== See also ==
- Women in the Bible
- Islamic views on concubinage
- Wartime sexual violence

== Bibliography ==
- Eisenstein, Judah D. (1970). A Digest of Jewish Laws and Customs - in Alphabetical Order (Ozar Dinim u-Minhagim) (in Hebrew). Tel-Aviv. OCLC 54817857. (reprinted from 1922 and 1938 editions of the Hebrew Publishing Co., New York)
- Ginzberg, Louis (1938). The Legends of the Jews. Vol. 4. Translated by Henrietta Szold. Philadelphia: The Jewish Publication Society of America. OCLC 1157176967.
- HaLevi, Aharon (1958). Sefer ha-Chinuch on the 613 biblical commandments (in Hebrew). Jerusalem: Eshkol. OCLC 762447043.
- Josephus (1981). Josephus Complete Works. Translated by William Whiston. Grand Rapids, Michigan: Kregel Publications. ISBN 0-8254-2951-X.
- Lehman, Menashe Raphael (1988). "A beautiful woman and other laws in the Temple scroll (אשת יפת-תואר והלכות אחרות במגילת המקדש)". Beit Mikra: Journal for the Study of the Bible and Its World (in Hebrew). 33 (3). Bialik Institute, Jerusalem: 33–316. JSTOR 23505022.
- Maimonides (2016). Mishneh Torah by Moses Maimonides (Book of Shoftim) (in Hebrew). Vol. 14. Jerusalem; Bnei Brak: Shabse Frankel. OCLC 989980005.
- Zechariah ha-Rofé (1992). Havazelet, Meir (ed.). Midrash ha-Ḥefetz (in Hebrew). Vol. 2. Jerusalem: Mossad Harav Kook. OCLC 23773577.
