= Mandatory war =

One of three types of war in Jewish law

In Jewish tradition, mandatory war (Hebrew: מלחמת חובה; milḥemet ḥovah), or compulsory war, refers to a war that requires the entire nation of the Jewish people to rise-up and to become actively engaged-in because of an existential threat to the Jewish nation. It is a war fought for Israel's national survival. The aim is to thwart the enemy advances against the nation of Israel, without the necessity of enslaving and exterminating the enemy, or of annexing the enemy's territory. It is contrasted with voluntary war.

== Characteristics ==
According to Maimonides, a mandatory war is a defensive war against an already launched attack.

A mandatory war is to be distinguished from a "voluntary war" (מלחמת רשות; milḥemet reshūt), that is to say, a battle waged of free choice, which requires the approbation of the Sanhedrin, presumably in order to impose a religious and moral check on reckless warfare. It is also to be distinguished from a "religious war" (מלחמת מצוה; milḥemet mitzvah), which is restricted to those nations mentioned in the Hebrew Bible, such as Amalek and the nations of Canaan. Some scholars also hold these to be a type of mandatory war. The biblical command, in the case of the Canaanite inhabitants, was to exterminate them and to annex their territory, whereas others who made peace with Israel could be enslaved and forced to pay tribute.

== General overview ==
Specifically relating to the halachic laws governing the Jewish nation, Spanish Jewish rabbi and scholar, Menahem Meiri, has described the conditions needed for there to be a "mandatory war", saying that all wars, excepting those made for the conquest of the Land of Israel (such as at the time of Joshua), are to be deemed as "voluntary wars". A ruler cannot compel the Jewish people to fight in such "voluntary wars" (so-named because the ruler of that nation is either angry at his enemy, or simply wishes to show his prowess, or to extend his territorial domain), unless it be by the authorization of the greater Sanhedrin, composed of seventy-one judges. However, if there were a case whereby the nation of Israel had been attacked by an enemy for any reason, that would be tantamount to a battle waged in a religious cause ("religious war"), in which case it is the bounden duty of all in Israel to fight and resist the enemy, hence: a mandatory war (or battle waged in duty bound).

Maimonides further explains that whenever Israel finds itself fighting a battle in a religious cause, such as when an oppressor has come upon them in war to destroy them, the people of Israel need not obtain prior permission from the Rabbinic court to fight, but may go forth to the battle, and compel others to do the same.

Wars fought to redeem captives, such as those wars waged by Abraham to free Lot, and by David to free Jewish women and children in Ziklag (1 Sam. 30), are generally categorized as defensive wars.

The Hebrew expressions, Milḥemet mitzvah (religious war) and Milḥemet ḥovah (mandatory war), are sometimes used interchangeably, since they include the reactive defensive wars when Jewish habitations were attacked. Rabbi Yehuda, however, distinguishes between these two expressions. (Note: Rabbi Yehuda's view on this subject is discussed in the Jerusalem Talmud (Soṭah, end of chapter 8). The account is as follows: "Said Rabbi Johanan: 'The difference between them (i.e. between the anonymous rabbi of the Mishnah and Rabbi Yehuda) is semantics. Rabbi Yehuda calls a voluntary war by the name religious war (i.e. since, in the final analysis, it is a war waged for Israel's benefit), but when it comes to a mandatory war, everyone goes out [to fight], even a bridegroom from his room, and a bride from her bridal-chamber.' Said Rav Ḥisda: 'There is a dispute between them (i.e. between the anonymous rabbi of the Mishnah and Rabbi Yehuda). As for the rabbis, they say that a religious war is the war of [King] David [which he waged against the Philistines and against Ammon], whereas a mandatory war is the war of Joshua [which he waged during the conquest of Canaan]. Rabbi Yehuda would call it a religious war, such as when we go out against them (i.e. against an enemy that has not physically attacked Israel, yet, one which bears animosity towards Israel), but [he would call it] a mandatory war, such as when they come out against us.' (End Quote))

== Rabbinic discussions ==
[When you go out to war against your enemies, and see horses and chariots and an army larger than your own, you shall not be afraid of them, for the Lord your God is with you, who brought you up out of the land of Egypt, etc. (Deut. 20:1–ff.)] What does the saying here advanced pertain to? Said Rabbi Yehuda: 'The matter concerns a religious war (milḥemet mitzvah). However, in a mandatory war (milḥemet ḥovah), all go forth [into battle], even a bridegroom from his room and a bride from her bridal-chamber.' Our Mishnah [in Soṭah speaks of] when you go out to war against your enemies. The writing [in Mishnah Soṭah] speaks about the voluntary war (milḥemet ha-reshūt) [fought at Israel's own discretion].

One of the fine points arising from the rabbinic discussions on the subject is that, whenever Israel voluntarily wages a battle of free choice against another nation, unto Israel would apply all the conditions mentioned in the Hebrew Bible (Deuteronomy 20:1–ff.) and in Mishnah Soṭah (chapter 8). Although certain persons were permitted by Deuteronomy, chapter 20, to leave the field before a battle began, this was allowed, according to rabbinical opinion, only in case of a voluntary war. Wherefore, a man who has betrothed a wife and has yet to consummate that marriage, or who has planted a vineyard and has yet to partake of its fruit, or who has built a new house and who has not yet lived in that house for a year's time, etc. is exempt from participating in that war. However, if Israel were faced with an existential threat, the conditions of Deuteronomy (chapter 20) and of Mishnah Soṭah (chapter 8) would not apply, as not even a bridegroom is exempt from that war, but must rally behind Israel, and go forth to fight in Israel's defense. A mandatory war is, therefore, tantamount to a "religious war" and, as such, the general principle applies to everyone: "He that is currently engaged in performing one biblical commandment (i.e. defending Israel), he is exempt from doing another biblical commandment (i.e. cohabiting with his bride, etc.)" (העוסק במצוה פטור מן המצוה).

=== Jewish soldiers conscripted in foreign armies ===
Although the laws governing a Mandatory war pertain to wars conducted in the Land of Israel, because of an existential threat to the Jewish people, it is still permissible for Jewish soldiers serving in foreign armies to set-out and rescue other Jewish and Gentile soldiers who had been taken captive by enemy forces, since the saving of Jewish life is tantamount to a Religious war, and may be waged without obtaining permission from the Court.

=== Warfare and the Sabbath-day ===
In Tractate Eruvin [45a] it was explained that when the nations of the world lay siege to the cities of Israel on the Sabbath-day, the people of Israel are not permitted to go out against them on the Sabbath-day with their armaments, but rather they (the besieged) are to shut themselves up before them and try to observe the laws of Sabbath as much as possible. What does the saying here advanced pertain to? This pertains to a case where it is certain that they have come to take away only money, or objects of money-value. However, if they had come to take away lives, even if it were only a doubtful case, the people of Israel are permitted to go out to battle against them and they desecrate the Sabbath on their account, in order to rescue them. If there was a Jewish city situated along the frontier of the Land of Israel where non-Jewish forces had laid siege to the city, even in such cases where they only came to take away bales of hay and straw, it is permitted for the Jewish nation to go out in battle against the invading army and to desecrate the Sabbath-day in order to save the city.

Elsewhere [ibid.], it was explained that even in the remaining cities and towns of Israel where the enemy had launched an attack, it is a Jew's bounden duty to go out to battle on behalf of his threatened countrymen, in order to assist them, and when they have eventually rescued their fellow countrymen, they are allowed to return to their place [on the Sabbath-day] with their own armaments in hand, seeing that if they were not allowed to do so they would refrain from assisting their brethren in future conflicts.

=== Ethical question ===
An ethical question was raised in the early 20th-century about whether or not one is permitted to give-up his own life in order to avert danger to the Jewish people as a whole, both in war and non-war situations, in which the answer posited by Abraham Isaac Kook (1865–1935) and by Shlomo Zalman Pines (1874–1954) was an unequivocal yes, although each man gave different reasons for this allowance. According to Rabbi Kook, "we expose ourselves to the dangers of killing and being killed in accordance with the nature of the world."

== See also ==
- Armed conflict
- Declaration of war
- Judaism and warfare
- Jus ad bellum
- Just war theory
- Law of war
- Laws of armed conflict

== Bibliography ==
- Ben Alexander, Uri (1985). "Violence and the Jewish Tradition". European Judaism: A Journal for the New Europe. 18 (2). Berghahn Books: 17–27. JSTOR 41442841.
- Danby, H., ed. (1977), The Mishnah, Oxford: Oxford University Press, p. 303 (Sotah 8:7), ISBN 0-19-815402-X
- Eisen, Robert (2016–17). "Rabbi Eliezer Yehudah Waldenberg on the Justification of War". The Torah U-Madda Journal. 17: 46–63. JSTOR 26203060.
- Eisenstein, Judah D. (1970). A Digest of Jewish Laws and Customs - in Alphabetical Order (Ozar Dinim u-Minhagim) (in Hebrew). Tel-Aviv. pp. 228–229 (s.v. מלחמה). OCLC 54817857. (reprinted from 1922 and 1938 editions of the Hebrew Publishing Co., New York)
- Elgavish, David (2008). "Justification for War in the ancient Near-East and the Bible". In Joseph Fleishman (ed.). The Bar-Ilan Conference volume: Jewish Law Association Studies 18 (2006). Liverpool: Jewish Law Association (14th International Congress). ISBN 9781906731007., ISBN 9781906731014
- HaLevi, Aharon (1958). Sefer ha-Chinuch on the 613 biblical commandments (in Hebrew). Jerusalem: Eshkol. OCLC 762447043.
- Hanschke, David (1980). "Abbaye and Rava — Two Approaches to the Mishna of the Tannaim". Tarbiẕ (in Hebrew). 49 (1–2): 187–193. JSTOR 23595080.
- Kimelman, Reuven (2023). "Judaism and the Ethics of War". The Cambridge Companion to Religion and War. pp. 215–240. doi:10.1017/9781108884075.013. ISBN 978-1-108-88407-5.
- Kuzmarov, Betina (2012). ""Recapturing" the "Other": Jewish Laws of War and International Law". Journal of Law and Religion. 28 (1). Cambridge University Press: 47–65. doi:10.1017/S0748081400000230. JSTOR 23645226.
- Maimonides (1974). "Hil. Melekhim, chapter 5". Sefer Mishneh Torah - HaYad Ha-Chazakah (Maimonides' Code of Jewish Law) (in Hebrew). Vol. 7. Jerusalem: Pe'er HaTorah. OCLC 122758200.
- Maimonides (1974b). "Hil. Shabbat, chapter 2". Sefer Mishneh Torah - HaYad Ha-Chazakah (Maimonides' Code of Jewish Law) (in Hebrew). Vol. 1. Jerusalem: Pe'er HaTorah. OCLC 122758200.
- Josephus (1981). Josephus Complete Works. Translated by William Whiston. Grand Rapids, Michigan: Kregel Publications. ISBN 0-8254-2951-X.
- Meiri (2006a). Daniel Bitton (ed.). Beit HaBechirah (Chiddushei ha-Meiri) (in Hebrew). Vol. 1. Jerusalem: Hamaor Institute. OCLC 181631040.
- Meiri (2006). Daniel Bitton (ed.). Beit HaBechirah (Chiddushei ha-Meiri) (in Hebrew). Vol. 7. Jerusalem: Hamaor Institute. OCLC 181631040.
- Obadiah of Bertinoro (2011). "Commentary of Rabbi Obadiah of Bertinoro". Mishnayot Zekher Ḥanokh (in Hebrew). Vol. 6 (seder nashim - bet). Jerusalem: Ḥ. Vagshal. OCLC 233395867.
- Sirkis, J. (2005). "Commentary of Bayit Chadash". Arbaa Turim Hashalem (Orach Chayim) (in Hebrew). Tel Aviv: Mekhon Yerushalayim. p. 34 (Orach Chayim §249:1). OCLC 1039272787.
- Tosephta (1970). M.S. Zuckermandel (ed.). Tosephta - Based on the Erfut and Vienna Codices (in Hebrew). Jerusalem: Wahrmann Books. OCLC 13717538. (first printed in Berlin 1899)
