= Milkhemet Mitzvah =

War by commandment

Milḥemet mitzvah or in Tiberian Hebrew milḥemeth miṣwah (Hebrew: מלחמת מצווה, lit. "war by commandment", or what is often termed a "religious war", a "war of obligation," a "war of duty" or a "commanded war") is the term for a war during the times of the Tanakh when a king (of the Kingdom of Israel) would go to war in order to fulfill something based on, and required by, the Torah without needing approval from a Sanhedrin, such as war against Amalek, or the seven nations of Canaan. In contrast, a milkhemet reshut (מלחמת רשות, "authorized war") is a discretionary war, which according to Jewish law requires the permission of a Sanhedrin. During times of war and military conflict, observant Jews are required to both work and fight, to the extent necessary, even on Shabbat, a time where Jews would normally be required to rest.

Unlike milkhemet reshut wars, which tended to be fought to expand territory or for economic reasons and had exemption clauses, milhemet mitzvah tended to be invoked in defensive wars, when vital interests were at risk.

== Applicability in modern times ==
The categories of milhemet mitzvah (religious war) and milhemet reshut (voluntary war) were applied by the later rabbis to describe wars occurring in earlier times, led by or against the kings of the Kingdoms of Israel and Judah. The milhemet reshut has not been applied or used since then; because the Jewish people have neither a king nor universally recognized Sanhedrin, there is no religious authority to authorize a milhemet reshut. Notwithstanding, there is more than one description of the terms "Milhemet Mitzvah" and "Milhemet Reshut". According to the Jerusalem Talmud (4th-5th centuries), "Milhemet Reshut" is described as an offensive war, rather than a defensive war which is "Milhemet Mitzvah". The discussion over compulsory and permitted (or, perhaps, "optional") wars also applies to certain exemptions given to individuals within the ancient Israelite and Judean society: engaged men, those who have just completed to build their house and have not lived in it and those who have not yet plowed their field before the war. All of these exemptions are given only in the case of "Milhemet Reshut." Talmud Scholars of both the Jerusalem and Babylonian Talmuds discussed the nature of the wars commenced by the Israelites during the biblical era (Tanakh) generally tend to describe the conquest of the Land of Israel in the Book of Joshua as Mitzvah Wars, while the wars fought by King David were meant to expand his kingdom, hence regarded as discretionary wars. Modern scholars also suggested that Mitzvah Wars originally signified a religious act.

Milhemet mitzvah (religious war) requires that Jews work or fight, even during the Jewish sabbath (shabbat), but that wars should only be continued from prior battles through shabbat. A new war should not be started on the sabbath day (Saturday):

"If [the fighting] began [before shabbat, but then carried on into shabbat], they need not stop [fighting]." That is to say, as long as the campaign started in the middle of the week, it is permissible to continue it even on Shabbat, based on the law of "until if falls." ...if enemies attack Israel, it is a mitzva to wage war against them even if this will endanger lives and require Shabbat desecration. Indeed, Rambam rules: “There is a mitzva incumbent upon all capable Jews to come to the aid of their brothers who are under siege, and to save them from non-Jews on Shabbat; they may not delay until after Shabbat…”

== See also ==
- Conquest
- Crusades
- Jihad
- Mandatory war
- Milkhemet Reshut
- Religious war
