= Alexander Rofé =

Biblical scholar

Alexander Rofé (born June 22, 1932) is an author and Professor Emeritus of the Bible at the Hebrew University of Jerusalem.

== Curriculum vitae ==
Rofé was born in Pisa, Italy in 1932.

At the Hebrew University he studied Hebrew Bible and the History of Israel. His teachers in Bible were M.D. Cassuto, Y. Kaufmann, I.L. Seeligmann, S. Talmon, M. Weiss, M. Haran, S.E. Loewenstamm; in History of Israel – B. Mazar, A. Malamat, A. Shalit; in Assyriology – H. Tadmor, in Hebrew Language – N. H. Tur-Sinai, E.Y. Kutscher, Ben-Haim, S. Morag; in History of Religions – D. Flusser, R.J.Z. Werblowsky. Rofe' wrote his dissertation under the supervision of I.L. Seeligmann, obtaining his Ph.D. in 1970.

Since 1959, Rofé has taught in the following academic institutions: The Hebrew University of Jerusalem, Haifa University, University of Pennsylvania (Philadelphia), Ben-Gurion University of the Negev (Beer Sheva), Yale University (New Haven, CT), Università degli Studi di Firenze (Italy), The Jewish Theological Seminary in New York, The Humanistic University in Moscow, Hebrew Union College in Cincinnati (Ohio), Pontificio Istituto Biblico (Rome, Italy), Studium Biblicum Franciscanum (Jerusalem), University of São Paulo (Brazil), Ariel University Center of Samaria, Facoltà Teologica di Sicilia (Palermo, Italy). In addition he offered guest lectures in the following universities: Rome, Pisa, Turin, The Catholic University in Milan, Venice, Catania (Sicily), Sorbon (Paris), Marburg, Göttingen, Tübingen (Germany), Columbia (New York), Brandeis (Waltham, MA), Bloomington (Indiana).

Rofé taught at the Hebrew University for nearly forty years. He was promoted to full professorship in 1986 and retired in 2000. He had served twice as head of the Department of Bible. He co-edited the series of monographs Jerusalem Bible Studies between the years 1979-1986 and has been editor and coeditor of Textus, Studies of the Hebrew University Bible Project, between the years 1995–2009.

== Research ==
Rofé has contributed to three fields of study in the Hebrew Bible: textual criticism, history of literature, and history of the Israelite religion. In his research he strives to integrate these fields, because each one of them is advanced by perceptions obtained in the other two.

== Bibliography ==
- The Prophetical Stories (Jerusalem: Magnes, 1988);
- Introduction to the Prophetic Literature (The Biblical Seminar, 49) (UNKNO, 1999)
- Deuteronomy: Issues and Interpretation (London:Clark & Continuum, 2002);
- Introduction to the Literature of the Hebrew Bible (Jerusalem: Simor-Eisenbrauns, 2009);
- Angels in the Bible: Israelite Belief in Angels as Evidenced by Biblical Traditions (Hebrew; Jerusalem: Carmel 2012).
