= Moses Samuel Zuckermandl =

Czech-German rabbi and theologian (1836–1917)

Rabbi Moses Samuel Zuckermandl, also Zuckermandel (24 April 1836, Uherský Brod, Moravia – 27 January 1917, Breslau (now Wrocław), Silesia) was a Czech-German rabbi, Talmudist, and Jewish theologian.

== Biography ==
Zuckermandl was a student of Samson Raphael Hirsch in Nikolsburg. He subsequently studied at the Jewish Theological Seminary of Breslau.

He became a rabbi in Pleschen (now Pleszew), Prussia, and was appointed lecturer of the Mora-Leipziger Foundation at Breslau, on 1 April 1898. His major literary efforts related to the Tosefta and included the first critical edition based on variant manuscripts, particularly the Erfurt manuscript.

== Literary works ==
- Die Erfurter Handschrift der Tosefta (1876)
- Die Tosefta nach den Erfurter und Wiener Handschriften (1880–1882)
- Spruchbuch Enthaltend Biblische Sprüche aus dem Gebetbuche (1889)
- Vokabularium und Grammatik zu den Hebräischen Versen des Spruchbuches I. (1890)

== See also ==
- Old Synagogue (Erfurt)
