= Menachem HaMeiri =

13th century Rabbi & scholar

Menachem HaMeiri מנחם המאירי

Personal life
- Born: 1249 Perpignan, Principality of Catalonia
- Died: 1315 (aged 65–66) Perpignan, Principality of Catalonia

Religious life
- Religion: Judaism

Jewish leader
- Main work: Writing commentaries and other books

Menachem ben Solomon HaMeiri (Hebrew: מנחם בן שלמה המאירי; French: Don Vidal Solomon; 1249–1315), commonly referred to as HaMeiri, the Meiri, or just Meiri, was a famous medieval Catalan rabbi, and Talmudist. Though most of his expansive commentary, spanning 35 tractates of the Talmud, was not publicly available until the turn of the 19th century, it has since gained widespread renown and acceptance among Talmudic scholars.

== Biography ==
Menachem HaMeiri was born in 1249 in Perpignan, which then formed part of the Principality of Catalonia. He was the student of Rabbi Reuven, the son of Chaim of Narbonne, France. In his writings, he refers to himself as HaMeiri ("the Meiri", or the Meirite; Hebrew: המאירי), presumably after one of his ancestors named Meir (Hebrew: מאיר), and that is how he is now known. Some have suggested that the reference is to Meir Detrancatleich, a student of the Raavad, who is mentioned in the Meiri's writings as one of his elders.

In his youth he was orphaned of his father, and his children were taken captive while he was still young, but no further details of these personal tragedies are known.

From the notorial certificates kept from Perpignan, it appears the Meiri made a living as a money lender, and his income was quite high.

The Meiri's principal teacher was Rabbi Reuven ben Chaim, and he kept a close correspondence and relationship with the Rashba, who was arguably the greatest Jewish rabbi of those times. Although the Meiri is known as one of the greatest scholars of his era, and despite his vast Torah knowledge and expertise, as testified to by many rabbis of his time and by his great expansive work Beit HaBechirah, there is no evidence he ever held a rabbinic position, or even a teaching position in a Yeshiva (Jewish school for religious studies). This may have been in accordance with the teaching of the Rambam, who spoke harshly against turning the rabbinate solely into a means of livelihood.

== Beit HaBechirah ==
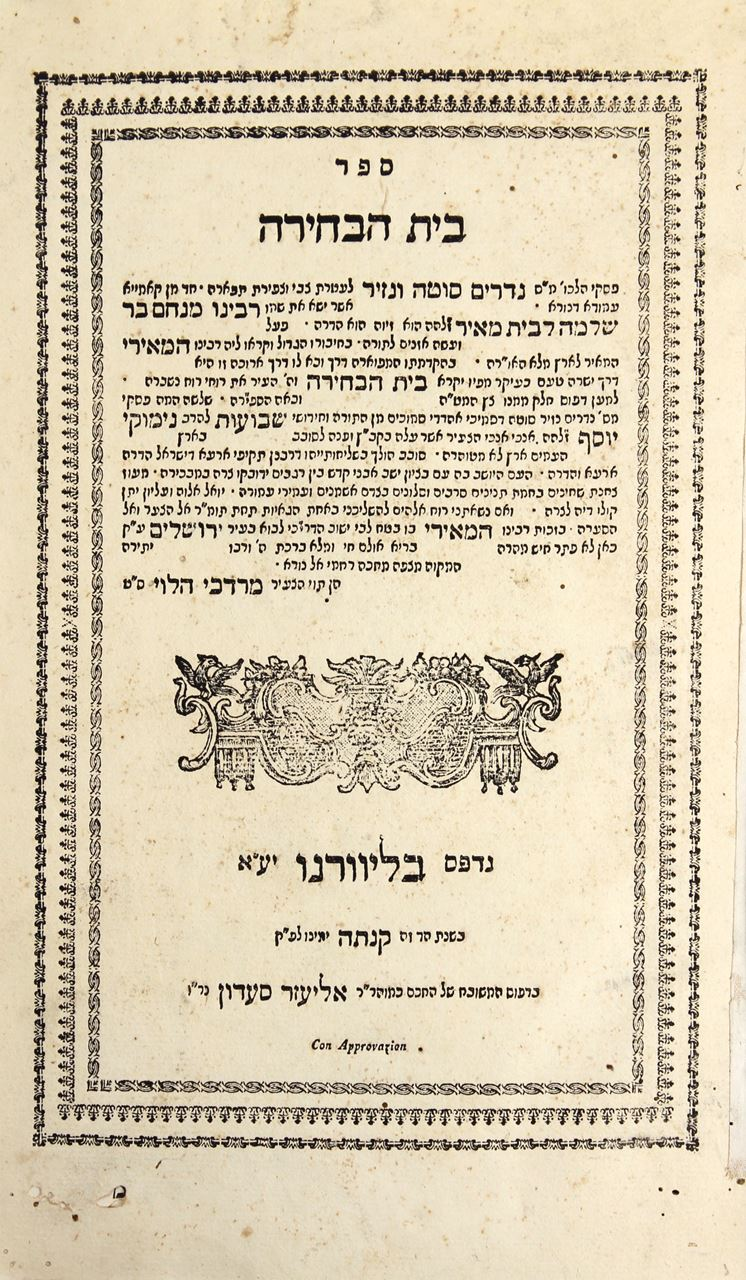
Title page of a 1795 edition of Beit HaBechirah

His commentary, the Beit HaBechirah (literally "The Chosen House," a play on an alternate name for the Temple in Jerusalem, implying that the Meiri's work selects specific content from the Talmud, omitting the discursive elements), is one of the most monumental works written on the Talmud. This work is less a commentary and more of a digest of all of the comments in the Talmud, arranged in a manner similar to the Talmud—presenting first the mishnah and then laying out the discussions that are raised concerning it. Haym Soloveitchik describes it as follows:

Meiri is the only medieval Talmudist (rishon) whose works can be read almost independently of the Talmudic text, upon which it ostensibly comments. The Beit ha-Behirah is not a running commentary on the Talmud. Meiri, in quasi-Maimonidean fashion, intentionally omits the give and take of the sugya, he focuses, rather, on the final upshot of the discussion and presents the differing views of that upshot and conclusion. Also, he alone, and again intentionally, provides the reader with background information. His writings are the closest thing to a secondary source in the library of rishonim.

Unlike most rishonim, he frequently quotes the Jerusalem Talmud, including textual variants which are no longer extant in other sources.

Beit HaBechirah cites many of the major Rishonim, referring to them not by name but rather by distinguished titles. Specifically:

- Gedolei HaRabbanim ("The Greatest of the Rabbis") – Rashi
- Gedolei HaMefarshim ("The Greatest of the Commentators") – Raavad (or Gedolei HaMagihim, "The Greatest of the Annotaters", when quoted as disputing Rambam or Rif)
- Gedolei HaPoskim ("The Greatest of the Poskim") – Isaac Alfasi
- Gedolei HaMechabrim ("The Greatest of the Authors") – Rambam
- Geonei Sefarad ("The Brilliant of Spain") – Ri Migash (or, sometimes Rabbeinu Chananel)
- Chachmei HaTzarfatim ("The Wise of France") – Rashbam (or, sometimes Rashi)
- Achronei HaRabbonim ("The Later of the Rabbis") – Rabbeinu Tam
- Gedolei HaDor ("The Greatest of the Generation") – Rashba

=== Historical influence ===
A complete copy of Beit HaBechira was preserved in the Biblioteca Palatina in Parma, rediscovered in 1920, and subsequently published. Snippets of Beit HaBechirah on one Tractate, Bava Kamma, were published long before the publication of the Parma manuscripts, included in the early collective work Shitah Mikubetzet. The common assumption has been that the large majority of the Meiri's works were not available to generations of halachists before 1920; as reflected in early 20th century authors such as the Chafetz Chaim, the Chazon Ish, and Joseph B. Soloveitchik who write under the assumption that Beit HaBechira was newly discovered in their time, and further evidenced by the lack of mention of the Meiri and his opinions in the vast literature of halacha writings before the early 20th century.

Beit HaBechira has had much less influence on subsequent halachic development than would have been expected given its stature. Several reasons have been given for this. Some modern poskim refuse to take its arguments into consideration, on the grounds that a work so long unknown has ceased to be part of the process of halachic development. One source held that the work was ignored due to its unusual length. Professor Haym Soloveitchik, though, suggested that the work was ignored due to its having the character of a secondary source – a genre which, he argues, was not appreciated among Torah learners until the late 20th century.

== Other works ==
Menachem HaMeiri is also noted for having penned a famous work used to this very day by Jewish scribes, namely, Kiryat Sefer, a two-volume compendium outlining the rules governing the orthography that are to be adhered to when writing Torah scrolls.

He also wrote several minor works, including a commentary to Avot whose introduction includes a recording of the chain of tradition from Moses through the Tanaim.

The Meiri also wrote a few commentaries (Chidushim) on several tractates of the Talmud which differ to some extent from some of his positions in Beit HaBechira. Most of these commentaries were lost, except for the commentary on Tractate Beitza. In addition, a commentary on Tractate Eruvin was attributed to him, but this attribution was probably a mistake.

== Halakhic positions ==
The Meiri's commentary is noted for its position on the status of gentiles in Jewish law, asserting that discriminatory laws and statements found in the Talmud applied only to the idolatrous nations of old.

According to J. David Bleich, "the Christianity presented so favorably by Me’iri was not an orthodox Trinitarianism but a Christianity that espoused a theology formally branded heretical by the Church". However, Yaakov Elman argued that Bleich had no sources for this assertion.

He wrote also that Jews are allowed to ascend the Temple Mount in Jerusalem.

== See also ==
- Hachmei Provence
