= Onias IV =

Jewish high priest, founder of the Leontopolis temple (2nd century BCE)

Onias IV (Hebrew: חוֹנִיּוֹ Ḥōniyyō) was the son of Onias III and the heir of the Zadokite line of High Priests of Israel. He built a new Jewish temple at Leontopolis in Ptolemaic Egypt where he reigned as a rival High Priest to the hierarchy in Jerusalem. While he never gained leadership in Judea, he still held influence in Egypt; the territory most heavily populated by Jews was called the Land of Onias in reference to his influence.

== Biography ==
Onias's father Onias III served as High Priest from 187–175 BCE. High Priest was also a governmental position, albeit one that kings did not usually interfere with after appointment. However, in 175 BCE, Onias III was dismissed from the High Priesthood and his brother Jason was given the role instead. It is not entirely clear why; possibly Jason offered a larger tribute to King Antiochus IV Epiphanes, possibly Onias III was seen as too friendly to the Ptolemaic dynasty, which had recently ruled Judea and aimed to reclaim it which would eventually become the Sixth Syrian War in 170 BCE. Onias III fled to the Seleucid capital Antioch (perhaps hoping to petition Antiochus IV to restore him), where he was killed by his enemies while attempting to claim sanctuary at the shrine to Apollo and Artemis.

Around 167–166 BCE, the Maccabean Revolt began, with one of its major causes being discontent with the policies of High Priest Menelaus. Presumably Onias IV hoped from afar for a victory by the rebel forces of Judas Maccabeus. In Onias IV's preferred scenario, the Maccabees would win, then invite Onias IV to take the office of his fathers. Alternatively, the Seleucid government would relent and appoint him as a bid to regain legitimacy among the populace. Neither of these happened, and instead the Seleucids appointed Alcimus around 162 BCE. Onias IV left Judea for Ptolemaic Egypt at some unknown point, most likely around the time of Alcimus's appointment as High Priest. Josephus presents two contradicting traditions: in The Jewish War, it is Onias III that flees to Egypt (possibly taking his son with him?). In Antiquities of the Jews, Onias IV leaves for Egypt during the reign of Antiochus V Eupator, around the time of Alcimus's ascension. Most historians favor the version in Antiquities, but it is difficult to know for sure.

In 152 BCE, the Hasmonean Jonathan Apphus made a deal with Seleucid royal claimant Alexander Balas where Jonathan was appointed as High Priest. As Balas went on to win the ongoing Seleucid civil war, this appointment stuck. Onias IV was not invited back to Judea to take his family line's position, and Onias's personal expectations of the Hasmoneans presumably darkened. The exact date is unknown, but with the permission of Ptolemy VI Philometor, Onias IV arranged the construction of a temple at Leontopolis. Josephus's book Jewish Antiquities, the main surviving ancient source, describes this construction immediately after describing the death of Demetrius I Soter in 150 BCE, but does not directly date the event. It might have happened around 145 BCE. Though comparatively small, the new temple was modeled on that of the Second Temple at Jerusalem, and was called by the name of its founder as the Temple of Onias. Onias possibly expected that after the upheavals in Jerusalem by the Syrians and the Maccabees the Egyptian temple would be regarded as the new legitimate one. As the Hasmoneans largely succeeded in maintaining autonomy, this did not happen; the Temple in Jerusalem was protected and the High Priesthood began to pass down the Hasmonean line. Both Josephus and the Mishnah Menahot consider Onias's act a despicable betrayal, and consider his temple illegitimate. Menahot chapter 13, mishna 10 directly says "The priests who served in the house of Onias may not serve in the Temple in Jerusalem". Even for Egyptian Jews, the latter did not possess the same importance as did the Temple of Jerusalem. That said, some scholars such as Victor Tcherikover have argued that the Temple was merely a center for local worship, and the opposition from the Temple of Jerusalem was an overreaction.

Onias IV, who enjoyed the favor of the Egyptian court, did succeed in elevating Egyptian Judaism to a position of dignity and importance. A large number of able-bodied Judeans had accompanied Onias to Egypt, and these strangers, who were there called Κάτοικοι ("inhabitants"), received, on condition of performing military service and preserving the internal peace of the country, tracts of land of their own, on which they lived with their families The district inhabited by them lay between Memphis and Pelusium, and was long called the "land of Onias." The first-born sons of the colonists inherited their fathers' privileges and duties. Both Chelkias (Hilkiah) and Ananias ben Onias (Hananiah), the sons of Onias IV, performed military service and acted as generals under Cleopatra III who reigned from 117 to 101 BCE. In the power struggle between Cleopatra III and Ptolemy Physcon (who reigned from 146 BCE to 117 BCE), the son of Onias were faithful to Queen Cleopatra. This suggests that candidates for the office of high priest occupied a prominent military position. In the course of time the family of Onias lost its prestige, and the later Alabarchs belonged to another family, not entitled to the rank of high priest. The Temple of Onias was closed in 73 CE by order of Vespasian in the aftermath of the First Jewish-Roman War.

== Patrilineal ancestry ==
Patrilineal descent
1. Abraham
2. Isaac
3. Jacob
4. Levi
5. Kehath
6. Amram
7. Aaron
8. Eleazar
9. Phinehas
10. Abishua
11. Bukki
12. Uzzi
13. Zerahiah
14. Meraioth
15. Azariah
16. Amariah
17. Ahitub
18. Zadok
19. Ahimaaz
20. Azariah
21. Yohanan
22. Azariah II
23. Amariah
24. Ahitub
25. Zadok II
26. Shallum
27. Hilkiah
28. Azariah IV
29. Seraiah
30. Jehozadak
31. Joshua the High Priest
32. Joiakim
33. Eliashib
34. Joiada
35. Johanan
36. Jaddua
37. Onias I
38. Simon I
39. Onias II
40. Simon II
41. Onias III
