= Onias III =

High Priest during the Second Temple period

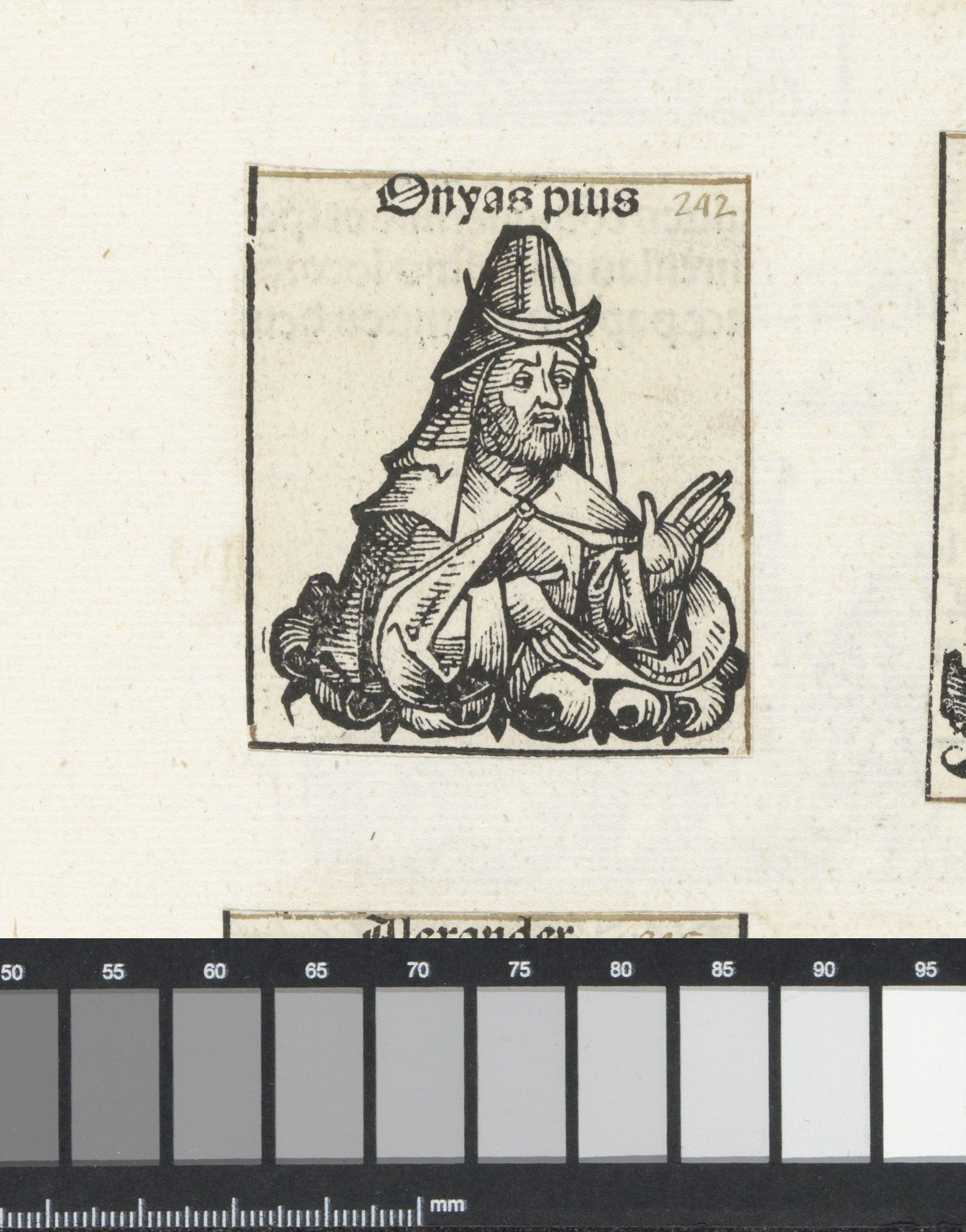
Onias III from Hartmann Schedel’s Nuremberg Chronicle (1493)

Onias III, son of Simon II (Hebrew: חוֹנִיּוֹ, romanized: Ḥoniyyo) called Onias Simonides in Koine Greek, was High Priest of Israel during the Second Temple period under the rule of the Seleucid Empire. He is described in the scriptures as a pious man who opposed the Hellenization of Judea.

Onias was usurped by his brother Jason after the ascension of Antiochus IV Epiphanes as ruler of the Seleucid Empire in 175 BCE.

== Politics of the office ==
Emperor Seleucus IV Philopator (r. 187–175 BCE) allowed indigenous worship throughout the empire and defrayed all expenses connected with the Second Temple. According to 2 Maccabees, a Hellenizing official of the Temple, Simon, a member of the Tribe of Benjamin, induced Seleucus through his official Heliodorus to plunder the Temple. The attempt was unsuccessful and the court never forgave the High Priest. When Antiochus IV Epiphanes succeeded Seleucus IV in 175 BCE, Onias was obliged to yield to his brother, Jason, a Hellenizer, according to 2 Maccabees 4:7 According to Josephus' Antiquities of the Jews, 12:5§1, Jason became high priest after the death of Onias; the latter's son was still a minor.

According to 2 Maccabees 4:26–27, Jason was undermined by his brother Menelaus; neither was a Levite, but brothers of Simon and thus Benjaminites. When Menelaus removed some vessels from the Temple to curry favor with the Syrian nobles of the Seleucid Empire, Onias accused him publicly. Then Onias fled to Daphne near Antioch, where Menelaus, aided by the royal governor Andronicus, had him secretly assassinated in defiance of justice and his oath. According to 2 Maccabees 4: 29-39, the murdered Onias III was deeply mourned by both Jews and Greeks, and the king also, on his return, wept for him and sentenced Andronicus to death.

However, Josephus contradicts this in The Jewish War, where Onias did not flee until the aftermath of the Sixth Syrian War, when the Seleucids, possibly in reaction to a local revolt, sent troops that defiled the Temple and sealed it shut about 167 BCE. Josephus says Onias fled to Ptolemaic Egypt, where he was appointed to an important local office under Pharaoh Ptolemy VI Philometor. As an official of the Heliopolite Nome, he established Leontopolis, where he built a replica Temple to Yahweh and was its High Priest since the Temple in Jerusalem was sealed and no sacrifices were being offered there.

Onias III is the central figure of the legendary history of later times; the Byzantine Chronicon Paschale says he officiated for twenty-four years, thus placing the beginning of his term of office under Egyptian rule. The Byzantine Chronographeion Syntomon follows Josephus in mentioning "another Onias" as the successor of Onias III., referring probably to Menelaus. According to Martin Hengel, Onias III was seen as too friendly to the Ptolemies by the Seleucid leadership to explain his replacement. Hengel is also skeptical of Jason of Cyrene and 2 Maccabees portraying Onias III as a devout priest and his brother Jason as a Hellenizer: The fact that Onias III retreated to the shrine of Apollo and Artemis at Daphne suggests he was not as zealous for keeping the law as 2 Maccabees would suggest, which portrays Onias III's replacement as part of a Seleucid attack on Judaism.

== Patrilineal ancestry ==
Patrilineal descent
1. Abraham
2. Isaac
3. Jacob
4. Levi
5. Kehath
6. Amram
7. Aaron
8. Eleazar
9. Phinehas
10. Abishua
11. Bukki
12. Uzzi
13. Zerahiah
14. Meraioth
15. Azariah
16. Amariah
17. Ahitub
18. Zadok
19. Ahimaaz
20. Azariah
21. Yohanan
22. Azariah II
23. Amariah
24. Ahitub
25. Zadok II
26. Shallum
27. Hilkiah
28. Azariah IV
29. Seraiah
30. Jehozadak
31. Joshua the High Priest
32. Joiakim
33. Eliashib
34. Joiada
35. Johanan
36. Jaddua
37. Onias I
38. Simon I
39. Onias II
40. Simon II

== See also ==
- Onias IV

== Resources ==
- Gottheil, Richard and Samuel Krauss. "Onias." Jewish Encyclopedia. Funk and Wagnalls, 1901–1906, which cites the following bibliography:

- H. P. Chajes, Beiträge zur Nordsemitischen Onomatologie, p. 23, Vienna, 1900 (on the name);
- Herzfeld, Gesch. des Volkes Jisrael, i. 185-189, 201-206;
- Heinrich Grätz, Gesch. 2d ed., ii. 236;
- Emil Schürer, Gesch. 3d ed., i. 182, 194-196; iii. 97-100;
- Niese, in Hermes, xxxv. 509;
- Julius Wellhausen, Israelitische und jüdische Geschichte, 4th ed., p. 248, Berlin, 1901;
- Hugo Willrich, Juden und Griechen vor der Makkabäischen Erhebung, pp. 77, 109, Göttingen, 1895;
- Adolf Büchler, Die Tobiaden und die Oniaden, pp. 166, 240, 275, 353, Vienna, 1899;
- J. P. Mahaffy, The Empire of the Ptolemies, pp. 217, 353, London, 1895;
- Heinrich Gelzer, Sextus Julius Africanus, ii. 170-176, Leipsic, 1885;
- Isaac Hirsch Weiss, Dor, i. 130 (on the halakic view of the temple of Onias).

Jewish titles
Preceded by Simon II	High Priest of Israel ? —175 BC	Succeeded by Jason
