= Simon II (High Priest) =

High Priest of Israel

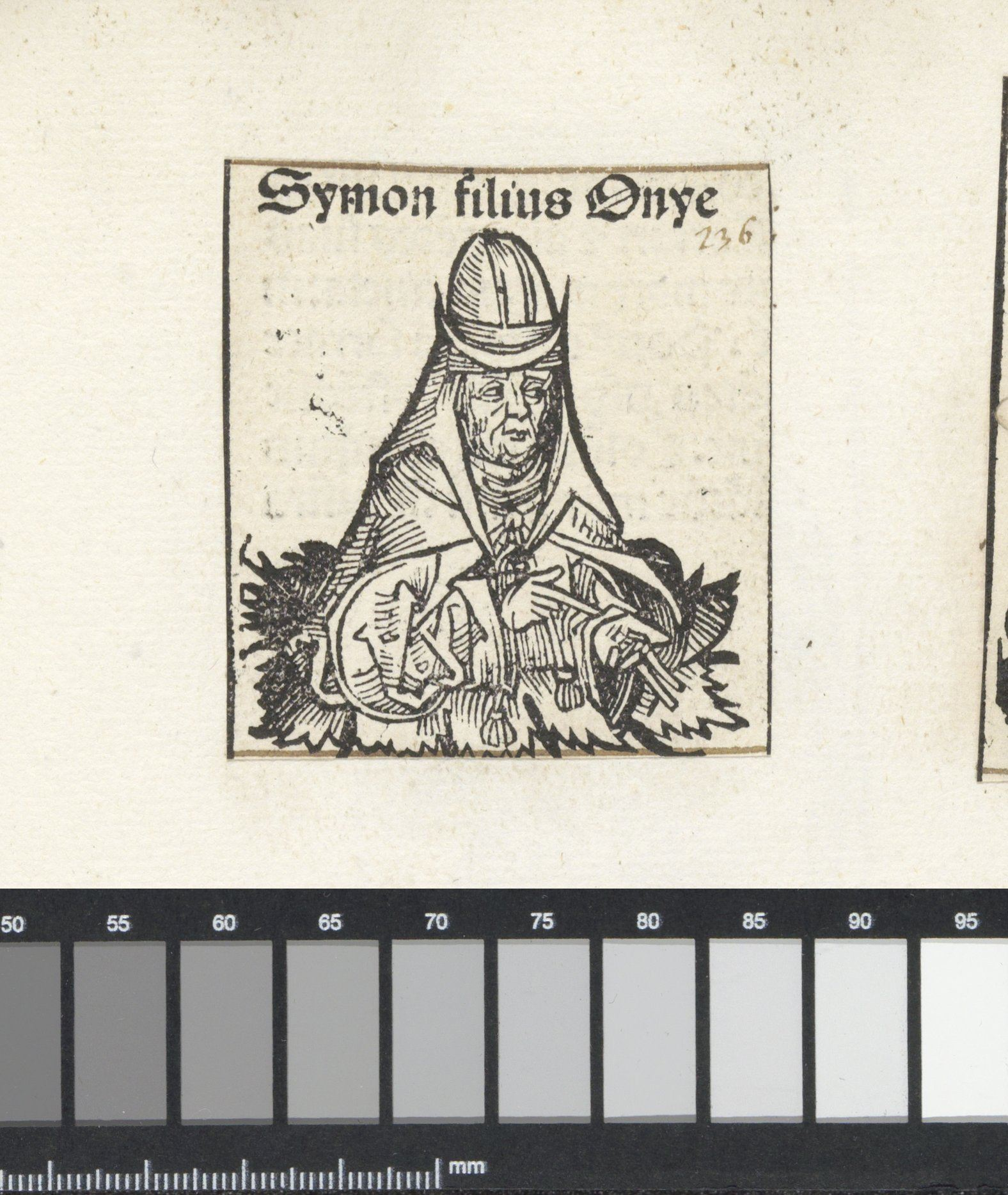
Simon II depicted in Hartmann Schedel's Nuremberg Chronicle (1493)

Simon II was a High Priest of Israel during the Second Temple period. He was the son of Onias II, and was probably succeeded by Onias III. There are two main sources that discuss Simon II: the Book of Sirach (also known as Ecclesiasticus) and possibly 3 Maccabees. Based on the Book of Sirach, Simon II was active at some point in the 190s BCE. If the reference to a High Priest Simon in 3 Maccabees is to the same person, then he was also active as High Priest in the 210s BCE as well. John J. Collins estimates his reign as 219–196 BCE for example, while Elias Bickerman suggests only that he served c. 190 BCE. He was possibly the same person as Simon the Just, although the historian Josephus thought this referred to Simon I instead.

== Primary sources ==
The records of High Priests during the Ptolemaic and early Seleucid eras of Judea are sparse – the main source that gives a list of them is Josephus's Jewish Antiquities Book XII. According to it, Onias II, son of Simon I, is succeeded as High Priest by Simon II, who is himself succeeded by Onias III, Simon's son. However, Josephus's account results in various implausible chronologies (he seems to think the Seleucid conquest happened during the term of Onias II), and Josephus himself may have been attempting to harmonize a legendary account with what he knew of the histories. Josephus also identifies Simon I as Simon the Just, but this title may possibly have truly been to Simon II and Josephus confused which Simon the title applied to.

The Book of Sirach recounts traditions and ancestors of the Jews in chapters 44–49. It concludes in Chapter 50 with Simon as the most recent such leader, praising him effusively in a hymn of Hebrew parallel verse:

The leader of his brothers and the pride of his people was the high priest, Simon son of Onias, who in his life repaired the house, and in his time fortified the temple. He laid the foundations for the high double walls, the high retaining walls for the temple enclosure. In his days a water cistern was dug, a reservoir like the sea in circumference. He considered how to save his people from ruin, and fortified the city against siege. How glorious he was, surrounded by the people, as he came out of the house of the curtain. Like the morning star upon the clouds, like the full moon at the festal season, like the sun shining on the temple of the Most High, like the rainbow gleaming in splendid clouds..."

— Jesus ben Sira, Book of Sirach 50:1-7, NRSVAE

The chapter goes on to describe a festival led by the High Priest Simon II and the celebrations of the people of Jerusalem.

The dating of the Book of Sirach is known with unusual precision compared to other contemporary books. A prologue written to the Greek translation is by someone who says that they are the grandson of Jesus ben Sira who arrived in Egypt in the thirty-eighth year of King Euergetes (Ptolemy VIII Euergetes II Tryphon, also known as "Physcon"), or 132 BCE in the Julian calendar. The book displays no awareness of the upheavals of the Maccabean Revolt, but is clearly written by a contemporary of Simon II, even if by the time the book was actually finished Simon II may have been dead. The result is that it appears that the book was written in the first quarter of the 2nd century BCE (c. 200–175 BCE), implying Simon II likely preceded Onias III, a high priest discussed in the book 2 Maccabees.

A high priest named Simon is also mentioned in 3 Maccabees. In chapter 2, he makes a long prayer after King Ptolemy IV Philopator attempts to enter the Second Temple, which is promptly granted by God who supernaturally prevents Ptolemy from entering. This scene takes place after the Battle of Raphia (217 BCE), suggesting that Simon may have been High Priest then as well. The main cause for concern is that 3 Maccabees is not generally considered a particularly reliable source for information, with much of its narrative seemingly closer to historical fiction or Greek romances. It is of course possible that the author had access to a since-lost source suggesting that a person named Simon was High Priest at the time (similar to the author's mostly accurate rendition of the Battle of Raphia), but it is also possible that the author conflated or misdated the High Priest in the era. However, some of Simon's deeds described in Sirach are seen as fitting to a High Priest who served during the contention for Jerusalem in the Syrian Wars, so scholars such as Lester L. Grabbe suggest that Simon II being high priest at the time is plausible.

== Patrilineal ancestry ==
Patrilineal descent
1. Abraham
2. Isaac
3. Jacob
4. Levi
5. Kehath
6. Amram
7. Aaron
8. Eleazar
9. Phinehas
10. Abishua
11. Bukki
12. Uzzi
13. Zerahiah
14. Meraioth
15. Azariah
16. Amariah
17. Ahitub
18. Zadok
19. Ahimaaz
20. Azariah
21. Yohanan
22. Azariah II
23. Amariah
24. Ahitub
25. Zadok II
26. Shallum
27. Hilkiah
28. Azariah IV
29. Seraiah
30. Jehozadak
31. Joshua the High Priest
32. Joiakim
33. Eliashib
34. Joiada
35. Johanan
36. Jaddua
37. Onias I
38. Simon I
39. Onias II

Jewish titles
Preceded by Onias II	High Priest of Israel; Late 3rd or early 2nd century BC	Succeeded by Onias III
