= Onias II =

High Priest of Israel

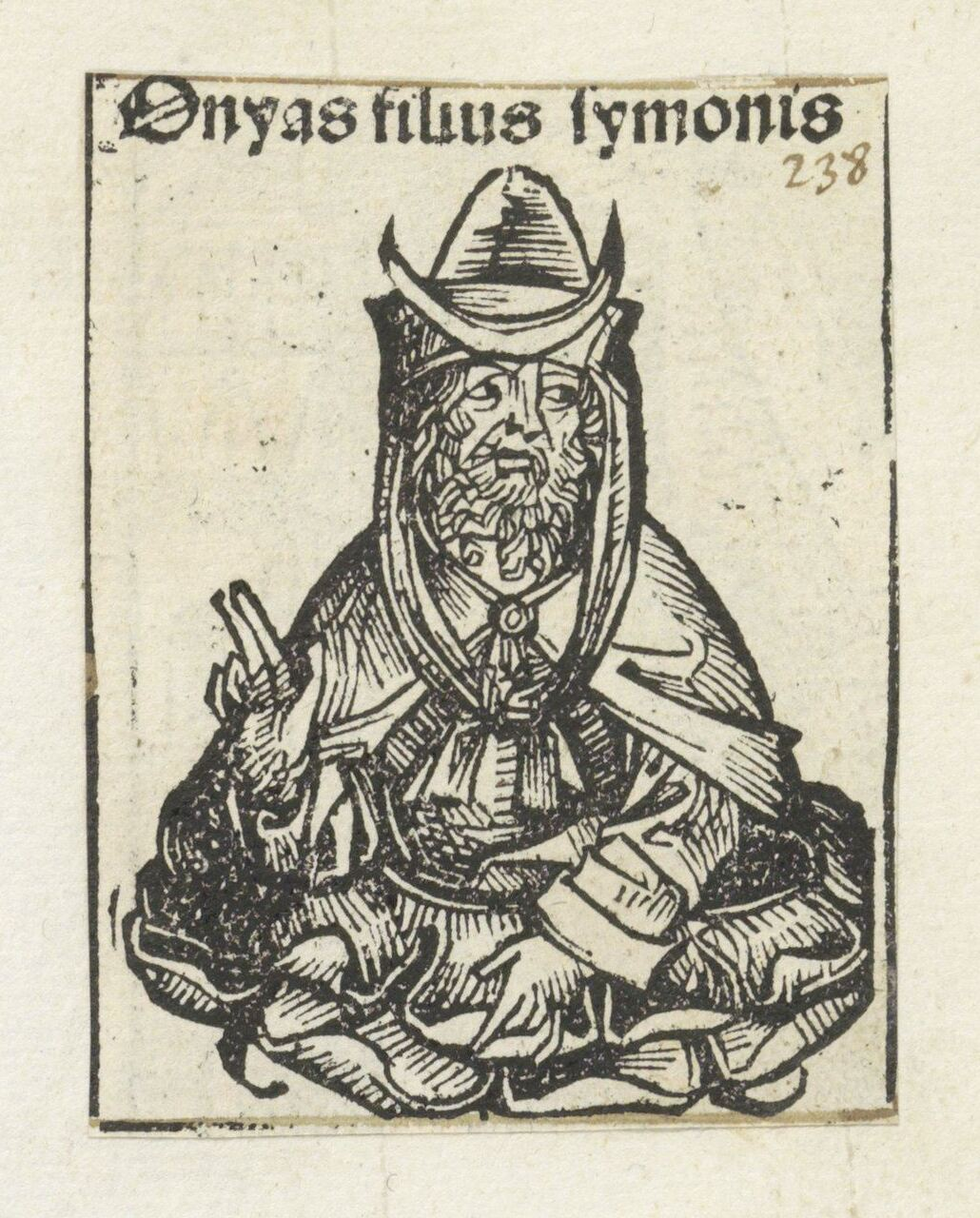
Onias II depicted in Hartmann Schedel’s Nuremberg Chronicles

Onias II (Hebrew: חוֹנִיּוֹ Ḥōniyyō or Honio or Honiyya ben Shimon; Greek: Onias Simonides) was the son of Simon I. He was still a minor when his father died, so his uncle Eleazar, and whom after, the latter's uncle Manasseh, officiated as high priests before Onais himself succeeded to that dignity. According to Josephus, he was a covetous man and of limited intelligence, whose refusal to pay the twenty talents of silver which every high priest was required to pay to Ptolemy III Euergetes, the King of Egypt (reigned 246 to 222 BC) threatened to imperil both the high priest and the people. The impending disaster was averted by Onias’ nephew Joseph, son of Tobias, who, having friendly relations with the Egypt court, managed to conciliate Ptolemy (Jos., Antiq. XII. iv. 1ff.). Onias is said to have died, almost simultaneously with his nephew Joseph, during the reign of Seleucus IV Philopator (reigned 187 BC to 175 BC), hence about 181 BC. His son, Simon II assumed the high priestly office after the demise of his father.

== Patrilineal ancestry ==
Patrilineal descent
1. Abraham
2. Isaac
3. Jacob
4. Levi
5. Kehath
6. Amram
7. Aaron
8. Eleazar
9. Phinehas
10. Abishua
11. Bukki
12. Uzzi
13. Zerahiah
14. Meraioth
15. Azariah
16. Amariah
17. Ahitub
18. Zadok
19. Ahimaaz
20. Azariah
21. Yohanan
22. Azariah II
23. Amariah
24. Ahitub
25. Zadok II
26. Shallum
27. Hilkiah
28. Azariah IV
29. Seraiah
30. Jehozadak
31. Joshua the High Priest
32. Joiakim
33. Eliashib
34. Joiada
35. Johanan
36. Jaddua
37. Onias I
38. Simon I

== Resources ==
- Gottheil, Richard and Samuel Krauss. "Onias". Jewish Encyclopedia. Funk and Wagnalls, 1901–1906, which cites to the following bibliography:

- H. P. Chajes, Beiträge zur Nordsemitischen Onomatologie, p. 23, Vienna, 1900 (on the name);
- Herzfeld, Gesch. des Volkes Jisrael, i. 185-189, 201-206;
- Heinrich Grätz, Gesch. 2d ed., ii. 236;
- Emil Schürer, Gesch. 3d ed., i. 182, 194-196; iii. 97-100;
- Niese, in Hermes, xxxv. 509;
- Wellhausen, I. J. G. 4th ed., p. 248, Berlin, 1901;
- Willrich, Juden und Griechen vor der Makkabäischen Erhebung, pp. 77, 109, Göttingen, 1895;
- Adolf Büchler, Die Tobiaden und die Oniaden, pp. 166, 240, 275, 353, Vienna, 1899;
- J. P. Mahaffy, The Empire of the Ptolemies, pp. 217, 353, London, 1895;
- Gelzer, Sextus Julius Africanus, ii. 170-176, Leipsic, 1885;
- Isaac Hirsch Weiss, Dor, i. 130 (on the halakic view of the temple of Onias).

Jewish titles
Preceded by Manasseh	High Priest of Israel; Mid 3rd century BC	Succeeded by Simon II
