= Manasseh (High Priest) =

High Priest of Israel

Mannasseh, also transliterated as Mannasses, was a Jewish High Priest (c. 245-240 BC) during the Second Temple period. He was the son of Jaddua and brother of Onias I.

He was succeeded by his nephew's son Onias II.

== Patrilineal Ancestry ==
Patrilineal descent
1. Abraham
2. Isaac
3. Jacob
4. Levi
5. Kohath
6. Amram
7. Aaron
8. Eleazar
9. Phinehas
10. Abishua
11. Bukki
12. Uzzi
13. Zerahiah
14. Meraioth
15. Amariah
16. Ahitub
17. Zadok
18. Ahimaaz
19. Azariah
20. Johanan
21. Azariah
22. Amariah
23. Ahitub
24. Zadok II
25. Shallum
26. Hilkiah
27. Azariah
28. Seraiah
29. Jehozadak
30. Joshua the High Priest
31. Joiakim
32. Eliashib
33. Joiada
34. Johanan
35. Jaddua

== See also ==
- List of High Priests of Israel

Jewish titles
Preceded by Eleazar	High Priest of Israel; Mid 3rd century BC	Succeeded by Onias II
