= Eleazar (High Priest) =

High Priest of Israel

- אלעזר
- Title: High Priest of Israel
- Parent: Onias I (father)
- Relatives: Simon I (brother); Manasseh (uncle)

Religious life
- Religion: Judaism

Jewish leader
- Period in office: c. 260 – 245 BC
- Predecessor: Simon I
- Successor: Manasseh

Eleazar (Hebrew: אלעזר) was a Jewish High Priest (c. 260–245 BC) during the Second Temple period. He was the son of Onias I and brother of Simon I.

Eleazar was the high priest involved in communication with Ptolemy II Philadelphus discussed in the Letter of Aristeas. According to the letter, Eleazar sent seventy two scholars, six from each of the tribes of Israel to the island of Pharos, in order to provide the Library of Alexandria with a Greek translation of the Hebrew Law, also called the Septuagint.

He was succeeded by his uncle Manasseh.

== Patrilineal Ancestry ==
Patrilineal descent
1. Abraham
2. Isaac
3. Jacob
4. Levi
5. Kohath
6. Amram
7. Aaron
8. Eleazar
9. Phinehas
10. Abishua
11. Bukki
12. Uzzi
13. Zerahiah
14. Meraioth
15. Amariah
16. Ahitub
17. Zadok
18. Ahimaaz
19. Azariah
20. Johanan
21. Azariah
22. Amariah
23. Ahitub
24. Zadok II
25. Shallum
26. Hilkiah
27. Azariah
28. Seraiah
29. Jehozadak
30. Joshua the High Priest
31. Joiakim
32. Eliashib
33. Joiada
34. Johanan
35. Jaddua
36. Onias I

== See also ==
- List of High Priests of Israel
