= Simon I (High Priest) =

High Priest of Israel

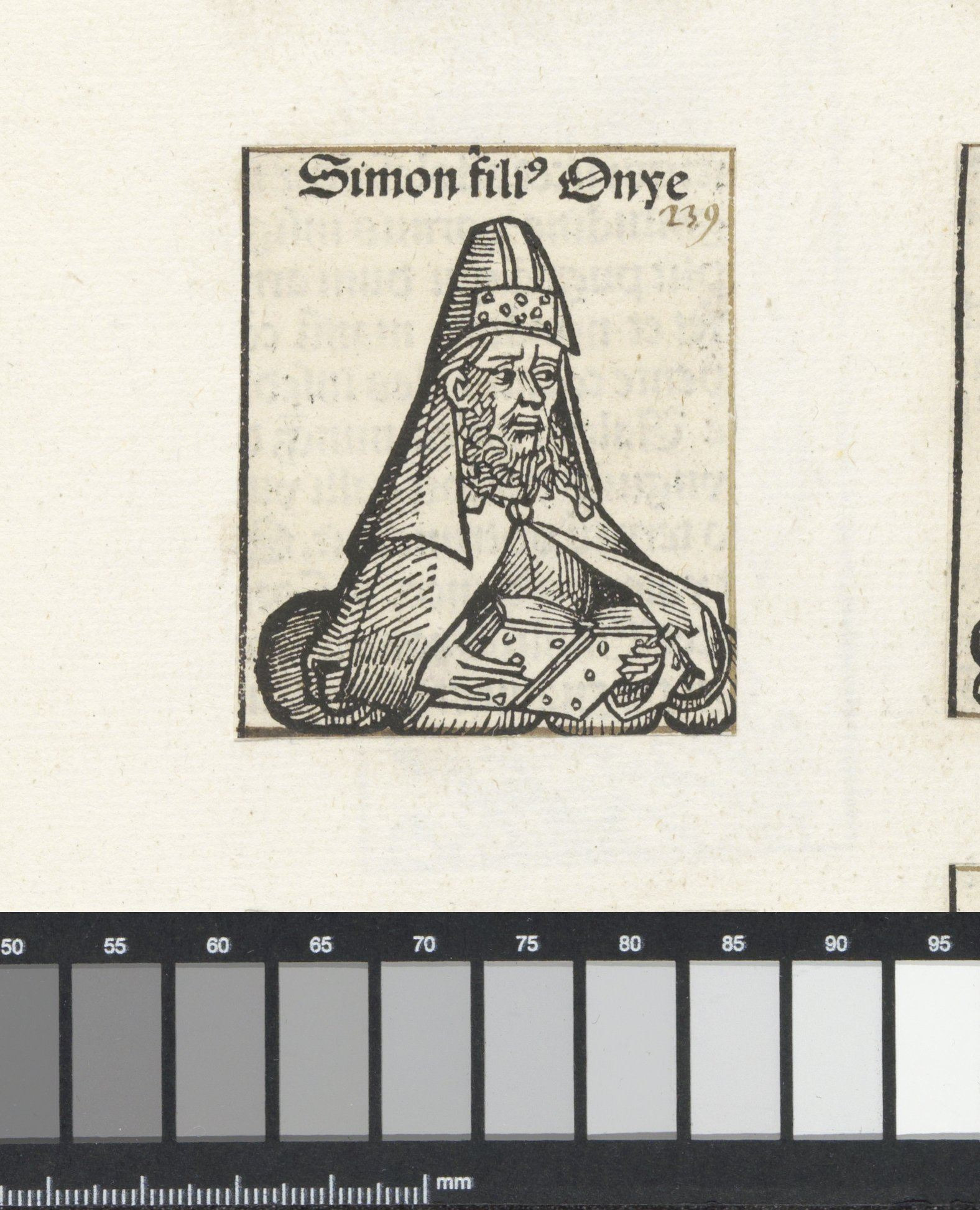
Simon I depicted by Hartmann Schedel’s book named Nuremberg Chronicles

Simon I, son of Onias I, (310–291 or 300–270 BCE) was High Priest in the Temple in Jerusalem during the Second Temple period.

Some writers identify him with Simeon the Just: the Jewish Encyclopedia (1906) names Fränkel and Grätz as examples.

== Patrilineal ancestry ==
Patrilineal descent
1. Abraham
2. Isaac
3. Jacob
4. Levi
5. Kehath
6. Amram
7. Aaron
8. Eleazar
9. Phinehas
10. Abishua
11. Bukki
12. Uzzi
13. Zerahiah
14. Meraioth
15. Azariah
16. Amariah
17. Ahitub
18. Zadok
19. Ahimaaz
20. Azariah
21. Yohanan
22. Azariah II
23. Amariah
24. Ahitub
25. Zadok II
26. Shallum
27. Hilkiah
28. Azariah IV
29. Seraiah
30. Jehozadak
31. Joshua the High Priest
32. Joiakim
33. Eliashib
34. Joiada
35. Johanan
36. Jaddua
37. Onias I

Jewish titles
Preceded by Onias I	High Priest of Israel; Early or mid 3rd century BC	Succeeded by Eleazar
