= Onias I =

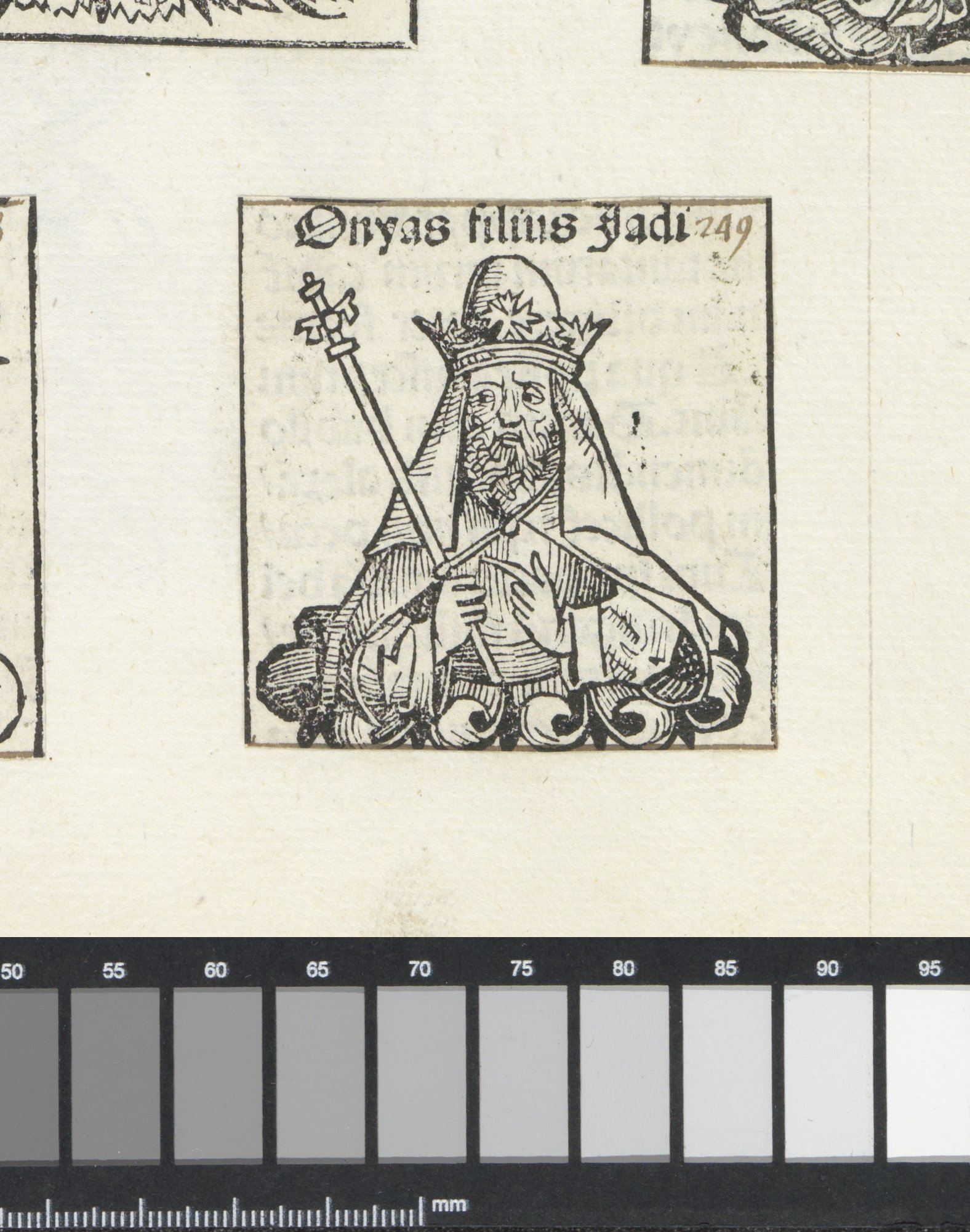
Onias II from Nuremberg Chronicles (1493)

Onias I (Hebrew: חוֹנְיוֹ, romanized: Ḥonyo; a.k.a. Honiyya or Honio ben Jaddua) was the son of the Jaddua mentioned in Nehemiah 12:11. According to Josephus, this Jaddua is said to have been a contemporary of Alexander the Great (r. 336–323– BCE). "Josephus is ... mistaken in placing it in the time of Onias III instead of Onias I, who was high priest c. 300 [BCE]". I Maccabees regards Onias as a contemporary of the Spartan king Areus I (309–265 BCE).

Simon the Just extolled in the Wisdom of Sirach. According to the Hebrew text, the son of Jonathan, but according to the Greek text, the son of Onias and in legend was probably the son of Onias I or, according to some, of the latter's grandson Onias II.

== Patrilineal ancestry ==
Patrilineal descent
1. Abraham
2. Isaac
3. Jacob
4. Levi
5. Kehath
6. Amram
7. Aaron
8. Eleazar
9. Phinehas
10. Abishua
11. Bukki
12. Uzzi
13. Zerahiah
14. Meraioth
15. Azariah
16. Amariah
17. Ahitub
18. Zadok
19. Ahimaaz
20. Azariah
21. Yohanan
22. Azariah II
23. Amariah
24. Ahitub
25. Zadok II
26. Shallum
27. Hilkiah
28. Azariah IV
29. Seraiah
30. Jehozadak
31. Joshua the High Priest
32. Joiakim
33. Eliashib
34. Joiada
35. Johanan
36. Jaddua

== Resources ==
- Gottheil, Richard and Samuel Krauss. "Onias." Jewish Encyclopedia. Funk and Wagnalls, 1901–1906, which cites to the following bibliography:

- H. P. Chajes, Beiträge zur Nordsemitischen Onomatologie, p. 23, Vienna, 1900 (on the name);
- Herzfeld, Gesch. des Volkes Jisrael, i. 185-189, 201-206;
- Heinrich Grätz, Gesch. 2d ed., ii. 236;
- Emil Schürer, Gesch. 3d ed., i. 182, 194-196; iii. 97-100;
- Niese, in Hermes, xxxv. 509;
- Wellhausen, I. J. G. 4th ed., p. 248, Berlin, 1901;
- Willrich, Juden und Griechen vor der Makkabäischen Erhebung, pp. 77, 109, Göttingen, 1895;
- Adolf Büchler, Die Tobiaden und die Oniaden, pp. 166, 240, 275, 353, Vienna, 1899;
- J. P. Mahaffy, The Empire of the Ptolemies, pp. 217, 353, London, 1895;
- Gelzer, Sextus Julius Africanus, ii. 170-176, Leipsic, 1885;
- Isaac Hirsch Weiss, Dor, i. 130 (on the halakic view of the temple of Onias).

Jewish titles
Preceded by Jaddua	High Priest of Israel; Late 4th or early 3rd century BC	Succeeded by Simon I
