= List of high priests of Israel =

This article gives a list of the high priests (Kohen Gadol) of ancient Israel up to the destruction of the Second Temple in 70 AD. Because of a lack of historical data, this list is incomplete and there may be gaps.

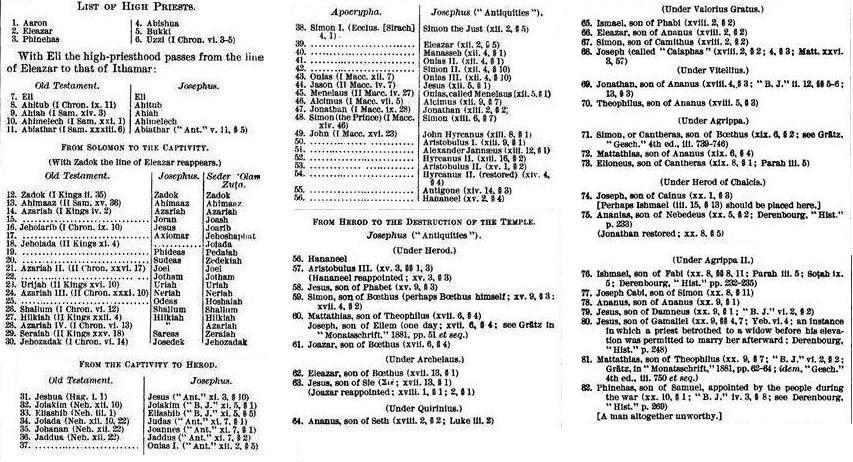
A traditional list of the Jewish High Priests

The High Priests, like all Jewish priests, belonged to the Aaronic line. The Bible mentions the majority of high priests before the Babylonian captivity, but does not give a complete list of office holders. Lists would be based on various historical sources. In several periods of non-Jewish rule, high priests were appointed and removed by kings, but still most high priests came from the Aaronic line. One exception is Menelaus, who may not have been from the Tribe of Levi at all, but from the Tribe of Benjamin.

== List ==
=== From the Exodus to Solomon's Temple ===
The following lineage appears in 1 Chronicles 5:29–31:

- Aaron
- Eleazar, son of Aaron
- Phinehas, son of Eleazar
- Abishua, son of Phinehas
  - The Samaritans insert Sashai as the son of Abishua and father of Bukki.
- Bukki, son of Abishua
- Uzzi, son of Bukki

Although Abishua, Bukki and Uzzi are not directly attested as high priests, this portion of the genealogy is assumed by other sources to give the succession of the high priesthood from father to son.

At some time, the office was transferred from descendants of Eleazar to those of his brother Itamar. The first known and most notable high priest of Itamar's line was Eli, a contemporary of Samuel.

- Eli, descendant of Ithamar, son of Aaron
- Ahitub, son of Phinehas and grandson of Eli
- Ahijah, son of Ahitub
- Ahimelech, son of Ahijah (or brother of Ahijah and son of Ahitub)
- Abiathar, son of Ahimelech

Abiathar was removed from the high priesthood for conspiring against King Solomon, and was replaced by Zadok, who oversaw the construction of the First Temple. According to the genealogies given in 1 Chronicles 5:30–34, Zadok was a descendant of Uzzi (through Zerahiah, Meraioth, Amariah and Ahitub) and thus belonged to the line of Eleazar.

=== First Temple period ===
Priestly lists for this period appear in the Bible, Josephus and the Seder Olam Zutta, but with differences. While Josephus and Seder 'Olam Zuta each mention 18 high priests, the genealogy given in 1 Chronicles 6:3–15 gives 12 names, culminating in the last high priest Seriah, father of Jehozadak. However, it is unclear whether all those mentioned in the genealogy between Zadok and Jehozadak were high priests, and whether high priests mentioned elsewhere (such as Jehoiada and Jehoiarib) are simply omitted or did not belong to the male line in this genealogy.

| 1 Chronicles 6:3–15 (* Also mentioned in Ezra 7:1–5) | Josephus | Seder Olam Zutta | Other biblical information |
|---|---|---|---|
| Zadok | Zadok | Zadok – contemporary of King Solomon | Zadok was High Priest during the construction of the First Temple. |
| Ahimaaz | Ahimaaz | Ahimaaz – contemporary of King Rehoboam | |
| Azariah | Azariah | Azariah – contemporary of King Abijah | Among the "princes/officials" of King Solomon listed in 1 Kings 4:2 "Azariah, son of Zadok, the priest" appears in first place. |
| Johanan | Joram | - | |
| - | Isus (Yehoshua) | Joash – contemporary of King Jehoshaphat | An Amariah is mentioned in 2 Chronicles 19:11 as "the chief priest" under King Jehoshaphat. |
| - | - | Jehoiarib – contemporary of King Jehoram | |
| - | - | Jehoshaphat – contemporary of King Ahaziah | - |
| - | Jehoiada | Jehoiada – contemporary of King Jehoash | Jehoiada, brother-in-law of King Ahaziah, is mentioned in 2 Kings 11:4–17 as a priest leading the coup against Queen-mother Athaliah and installing Jehoash of Judah as king of Judah. |
| - | Axioramos (Ahiram) | - | - |
| - | Phideas | Pediah – contemporary of King Jehoash | - |
| - | Sudeas | Zedekiah – contemporary of King Amaziah | - |
| Azariah* | Juelus | Joel – contemporary of King Uzziah | Azariah II is mentioned in 2 Chronicles 26:14–18 as a "chief priest" opposing King Uzziah. In 1 Chronicles 5:36 Azariah, son of Johanan is singled out as "he it is that executed the priest's office in the house that Solomon built in Jerusalem". |
| Amariah* | Jotham | Jotham – contemporary of King Jotham | - |
| Ahitub II* | Urias | Urijah – contemporary of King Ahaz | Uriah is mentioned in 2 Kings 16:10–16 as a priest who, on orders of King Ahaz, replaces the altar in the temple with a new, Assyrian-style altar. He is also mentioned as a witness in Isaiah 8:2. |
| - | Nerias | Neria – contemporary of King Hezekiah | An Azariah is mentioned in 2 Chronicles 31:10 as "the chief priest, of the house of Zadok" under King Hezekiah. |
| Zadok II* | Odeas | Hoshaiah – contemporary of King Manasseh | - |
| Shallum* | Shallum | Shallum – contemporary of King Amon | Shallum, son of Zadok II. |
| Hilkiah* | Elcias | Hilkiah – contemporary of King Josiah and of King Jehoahaz | Hilkiah, priest at the time of King Josiah and the discovery of the lost Book of the Law. |
| Azariah IV* | Azaros | Azariah IV – contemporary of King Jehoiakim | Azariah IV, son of Hilkiah (1 Chronicles 6:13) |
| Seraiah* | Sareas | Seraiah – contemporary of King Jeconiah and of King Zedekiah | Seraiah, son of Azariah IV (2 Ki 25:18) |

Some name Jehozadak, son of Seriah, as a high priest prior to being sent to captivity in Babylonia, based on the biblical references to "Joshua, son of Jehozadak, the high priest". According to the commentary attributed to Rashi, this is a misreading of the phrase, as "the high priest" does not refer to Jehozadak (who was exiled without having served as high priest), but to his son Joshua.

=== After the Babylonian captivity ===
The high priests following the exile were:

- Joshua, son of Jehozadak, after the building of the Second Temple. Contemporary of Cyrus the Great (reigned 538–530 BCE) and Darius I (reigned 522–486 BCE).
- Joiakim, son of Joshua (Nehemiah 12:10).
- Eliashib, son of Joiakim (Nehemiah 12:10). Mentioned in the time of Nehemiah in 444 BCE.
- Joiada, son of Eliashib (Nehemiah 12:10). (A son married a daughter of Sanballat the Horonite, for which he was driven out of the Temple by Nehemiah)
- Johanan, son of Joiada (Nehemiah 12:11). Mentioned in the Elephantine papyri in 410 BCE.
- Jaddua, son of Johanan (Nehemiah 12:11). Contemporary of Alexander the Great (reigned 336–323 BCE). Some have identified him as Simeon the Just.

Moreover, there are some sources in Rabbinic tradition that supports the notion that Ezra may have served as Kohen Gadol.

The chronology given above, based on Josephus, however is not undisputed, with some alternatively placing Jaddua during the time of Darius II (423–405/4 BC) and some supposing one more Johanan and one more Jaddua in the following time, the latter Jaddua being contemporary of Alexander the Great.

- Onias I, son of Jaddua. Contemporary of Areus I of Sparta (reigned 309–265 BCE).
- Simon I, son of Onias. Josephus identified him as Simeon the Just
- Eleazar, son of Onias and brother of Simon I. Contemporary of Ptolemy II Philadelphus of Egypt (reigned 283–246 BCE).
- Manasseh, son of Jaddua, brother of Onias I and uncle of Simon I and Eleazar.
- Onias II, son of Simon I. Contemporary of Ptolemy III Euergetes of Egypt (reigned 246–221 BCE).
- Simon II, son of Onias II. Contemporary of Ptolemy IV Philopator of Egypt (221–204 BCE).
- Onias III, son of Simon II (?–175 BC), murdered 170 BCE
  - Onias IV, son of Onias III, fled to Egypt and in c. 150 BCE built a Jewish Temple at Leontopolis (closed between 66–73 CE).
- Jason, son of Simon II, 175–172 BCE (the last of the Zadokite dynasty).
- Menelaus, 172–162 BCE
- Alcimus, 162–159 BCE

=== Inter-sacerdotium ===
It is unknown who held the position of High Priest of Jerusalem between Alcimus' death and the accession of Jonathan Apphus. Josephus relates that the office was vacant for seven years. As the Yom Kippur Temple service requires the high priest, Josephus' account would suggest a seven-year gap in service soon after the restoration of the Temple.

Elsewhere, Josephus suggests that Judas Maccabeus, the brother of Jonathan, held the office for three years, succeeding Alcimus. However, Judas actually predeceased Alcimus by one year. The nature of Jonathan's accession to the high priesthood makes it unlikely that Judas held that office during the inter-sacerdotium. The Jewish Encyclopedia tries to harmonise the contradictions found in Josephus by supposing that Judas held the office "immediately after the consecration of the Temple (165–162), that is, before the election of Alcimus".

It has been argued that the founder of the Qumran community, the Teacher of Righteousness, was High Priest (but not necessarily the sole occupant) during the inter-sacerdotium and was driven off by Jonathan.

=== Hasmonean dynasty ===
- Jonathan Apphus, 152–143 BC
- Simon Thassi, brother of Jonathan Apphus, 143–134 BC
- John Hyrcanus I, son of Simeon Tassi, 134–104 BC
- Aristobulus I, son of John Hyrcanus, 104–103 BC
- Alexander Jannaeus, son of John Hyrcanus, 103–76 BC
- John Hyrcanus II, son of Alexander Jannaeus, 76–66 BC
- Aristobulus II, son of Alexander Jannaeus, 66–63 BC
- Hyrcanus II (restored), 63–40 BC
- Antigonus, son of Aristobulus II, 40–37 BC

=== Herodian-Roman period ===
- Ananelus, 37–36 BC
- Aristobulus III, grandson of Aristobulus II and Hyrcanus II, 36 BCE (He was the last of the Hasmoneans; brother of Herod's second wife Mariamne I)
- Ananelus (restored), 36–30 BC
- Joshua ben Fabus, 30–23 BC
- Simon ben Boethus, 23–4 BC (his daughter Mariamne II was the third wife of Herod the Great)
- Matthias ben Theophilus, 4 BC
- Joazar ben Boethus, 4 BC
- Eleazar ben Boethus, 4–3 BC
- Joshua/ Jesus ben Sie , 3 BC – ?
- Joazar ben Boethus (restored), ? – 6 AD
- Ananus ben Seth, 6–15
- Ishmael ben Fabus (Phiabi), 15–16
- Eleazar ben Ananus, 16–17
- Simon ben Camithus, 17–18
- Joseph ben Caiaphas, 18–36 (son-in-law of the high priest Ananus ben Seth)
- Jonathan ben Ananus, 36–37
- Theophilus ben Ananus, 37–41
- Simon Cantatheras ben Boethus, 41–43
- Matthias ben Ananus, 43
- Elioneus ben Simon Cantatheras, 43–44
- Jonathan ben Ananus, 44
- Josephus ben Camydus, 44–46
- Ananias son of Nedebeus, 46–58
- Ishmael II ben Fabus, 58–62 (relation to priest of same name from 15–16 CE?)
- Joseph Cabi ben Simon, 62–63
- Ananus ben Ananus, 63
- Jesus/Jeshua son of Damneus, 63
- Joshua/Jeshua/ Jesus ben Gamla, 63–64 (his wife Martha belonged to family of Boethus)
- Mattathias ben Theophilus, 65–66
- Phannias ben Samuel, 67–70

== See also ==
- Josephus' chain of high priests (from the Second Temple)
- Samaritan High Priest
