= Jaddua =

4th-century BC High Priest of Israel

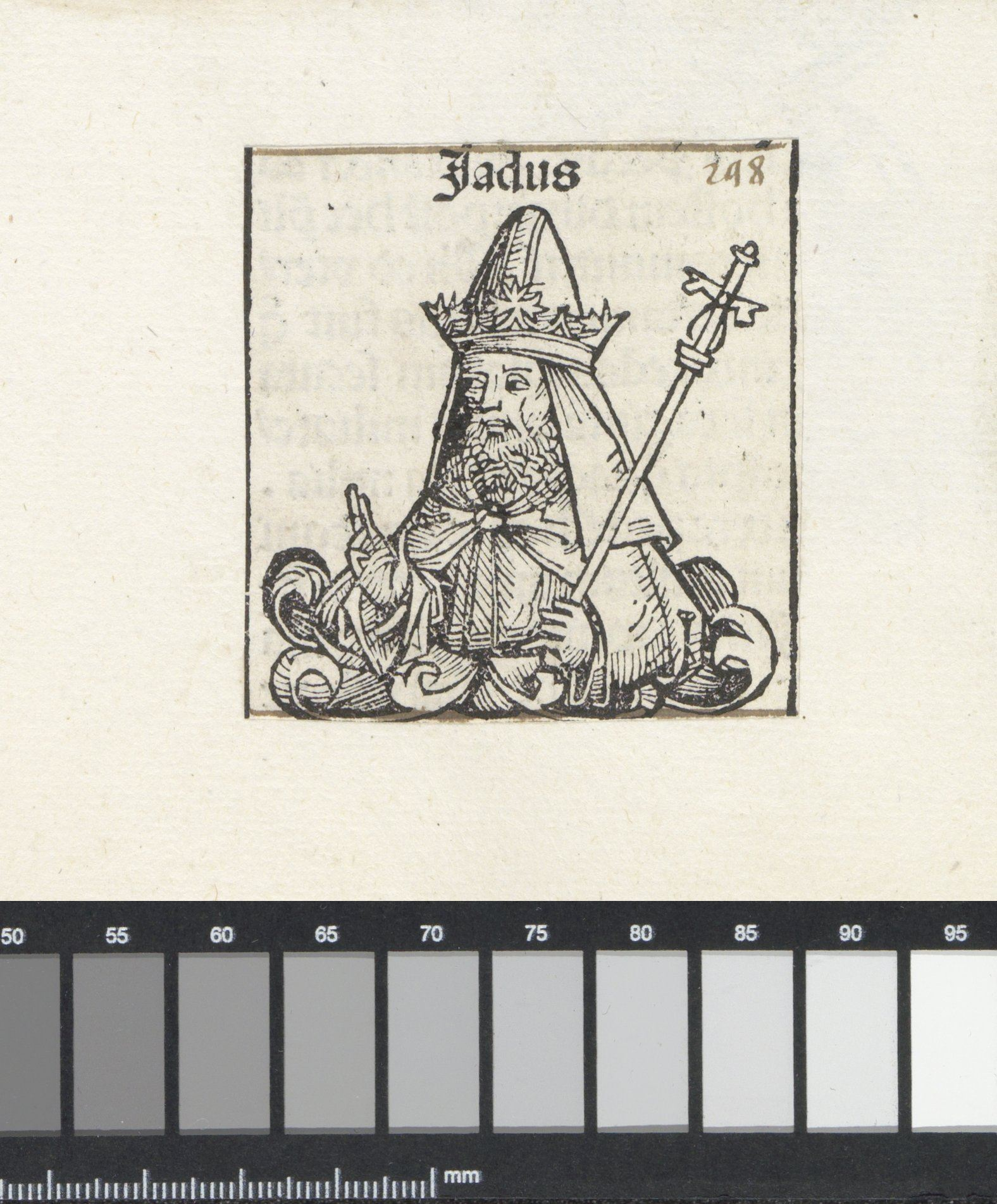
Jaddua depicted from Hartmann Schedel's Nuremberg Chronicles (1493)

Jaddua was a son of Johanan and a high priest during the post-exilic period. However, according to Nehemiah 12:22 it is possible that a transcribing error has occurred in the rendering of Jaddua's father's name. A more likely translation is that Jaddua's father was Johanan. (Anchor Bible Dictionary). Reference to Jaddua may be found in Nehemiah verses 12:11, 22. When reading Josephus' accounts of Jaddua's priestly position, it is unclear whether or not Jaddua was the sole high priest or if he shared the office with Manasseh. The other possibility (which is difficult to discern from Josephus' accounts) is that Manasseh was Jaddua's assistant or sagan. (Anchor Bible Dictionary).

Jaddua's brother, Manasseh, married into the gubernatorial Samarian family. The governor's daughter, Nicaso, was given to Manasseh in marriage to try to ease the tensions that existed between the Samaritans and the Jews. This posed a problem for the Jewish elders as they did not want the high priesthood being tainted should Manasseh try to partner Jaddua as a priest. There are elders in Jerusalem who had the ability and authority to force Manasseh "either to divorce his wife or not to approach the altar." (Vanderkam) In this dispute, Jaddua himself took the side of the elders of Jerusalem. Although the elders exercised authority, Jaddua was the top authority. In an account of the Jewish historian Josephus, it is speculated that the reason the elders opposed Manasseh's marriage was that they resented “the fact that the brother of the high priest Jaddua was sharing the high priesthood while married to a foreigner.” This marriage could possibly be the beginning of an office known as a sagan which later became the second highest priestly position. Because the high priest was the supreme civil and religious head of the Jewish people and the only competing authority would be the elders, Alexander naturally targeted Jaddua.

Manasseh was not willing to "be deprived of his sacerdotal dignity on [Nicaso's] account." Consequently, the Governor bribed Manasseh to keep Nicasco as his wife pending the permission of the Persian king Darius III. Meanwhile, Jaddua had a dream that he would be protected by God from the king Alexander as Alexander was pursuing to conquer Jerusalem. Upon seeing Jaddua, Alexander relented his pursuit as he too had a dream seeing a figure who took the form of Jaddua. Alexander agreed to let Jaddua and the Jews keep the laws of their forefathers in return for military cooperation.

Josephus included an account of Alexander reading the book of Daniel and believing that the prophecy regarding the destruction of the Achaemenid Empire was talking about him and his future conquests. The account details Alexander's visit to Jerusalem.

== Patrilineal ancestry ==
Assuming his father is Johanan

Patrilineal descent
1. Abraham
2. Isaac
3. Jacob
4. Levi
5. Kehath
6. Amram
7. Aaron
8. Eleazar
9. Phinehas
10. Abishua
11. Bukki
12. Uzzi
13. Zerahiah
14. Meraioth
15. Azariah
16. Amariah
17. Ahitub
18. Zadok
19. Ahimaaz
20. Azariah
21. Yohanan
22. Azariah II
23. Amariah
24. Ahitub
25. Zadok II
26. Shallum
27. Hilkiah
28. Azariah IV
29. Seraiah
30. Jehozadak
31. Joshua the High Priest
32. Joiakim
33. Eliashib
34. Joiada
35. Johanan

Jewish titles
Preceded by Johanan	High Priest of Israel; Late 4th century BC	Succeeded by Onias I
