= Joiada =

5th-century BC High Priest of Israel

Joiada (Hebrew: יוֹיָדָע Yōyāḏā‘, "Yah knows") is a name found from the form "Jehoiada" in the Hebrew Bible and used alternately in English versions.

"The Jeshanah Gate was repaired by Joiada son of Paseah and Meshullam son of Besodeiah. They laid its beams and put its doors with their bolts and bars in place"

— Nehemiah, 3:6, NIV

Joiada is the fourth High Priest of Israel after the Babylonian captivity and his name is only found in the lists of Neh 12:10-11, 22 and in Neh 13:28. Most historians describe Joiada as the son of Eliashib, ca. 433-410 BCE. However, there are two existing problems with the chronologies. First, it is believed that Joiada may be the grandson of Eliashib. The word "son" may refer to a father-son relationship, but alternatively refers to a grandson or brother. However, it is suggested that (Ezra 2:43 & Neh 12:23) are related and may be referring to another Eliashib and Johanan because they were common names at that time. The second problem involves the time span of the list given because some believe the list Eliashib to Joiada to Jonathan to Jaddua was a time span of 150 years. It is also possible that not all of the names of the high priests are included.

The only information given about Joiada is that his son married the daughter of Sanballat the Horonite for which he was driven out of the Temple by Nehemiah. This is important because the books of Ezra and Book of Nehemiah contain severe instructions against marrying foreign women. These foreign marriages led to tension between the Jewish governor and the high-priestly family. The son of Joiada was removed from the temple by Nehemiah and banished from Judah, however nothing suggests that Joiada's family received further punishment.

== Patrilineal Ancestry ==
Patrilineal descent
1. Abraham
2. Isaac
3. Jacob
4. Levi
5. Kehath
6. Amram
7. Aaron
8. Eleazar
9. Phinehas
10. Abishua
11. Bukki
12. Uzzi
13. Zerahiah
14. Meraioth
15. Azariah
16. Amariah
17. Ahitub
18. Zadok
19. Ahimaaz
20. Azariah
21. Yohanan
22. Azariah II
23. Amariah
24. Ahitub
25. Zadok II
26. Shallum
27. Hilkiah
28. Azariah IV
29. Seraiah
30. Jehozadak
31. Joshua the High Priest
32. Joiakim
33. Eliashib

== Sources ==
- Williamson, H.G.M. 1977. The Historical Value of Josephus' Jewish Antiquities XI. 297-301. JTS 28:49-66.
- Vanderkam, James. From Joshua to Caiaphas. 53-54.
- Gottheil/Krauss, 2002. Jewishencyclopedia.com

Jewish titles
Preceded by Eliashib	High Priest of Israel; Mid 5th century BC	Succeeded by Johanan
