= Dual messiahs =

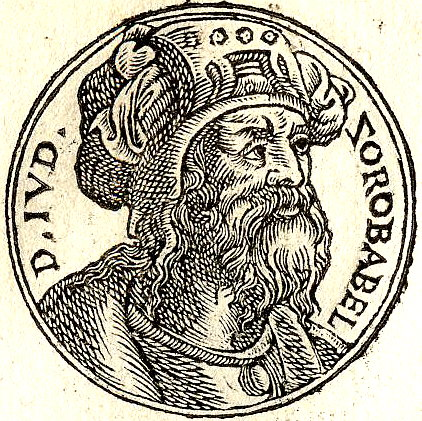
Zerubbabel, a scion of the House of David during the Babylon Exile and prophesied King of Judah

The idea of dual messiahs is the belief that there are either two messiahs or one messiah assuming the role of two. Later-Judaism talks about two messiahs — sons respectively of Joseph and of David.

Likewise in the Book of Zechariah, the Prophet Zechariah describes the construction of a future "Temple of the Lord" in Jerusalem where two rulers are anointed to serve and rule. Rather than being the sons of David and Joseph, these dual messiahs act as complementary leaders, one serving as the Davidic monarch and the other as the High Priest. In this instance, the two figures, Zerubbabel and Yeshua ben Yehozadak, are described as two olive trees which stand on either side of a golden lampstand. They are described as "the two who are anointed to serve the Lord of all the earth."

== See also ==
- Messiah ben David
- Messiah ben Joseph
- Zerubbabel
- Joshua the son of Jehozadak
- Third Temple
