= Johanan (High Priest) =

High Priest of Israel (reigned c. 410–371 BCE)

Johanan (Hebrew: יוֹחָנָן, romanized: Yoḥānān), son of Joiada, was the fifth High Priest of the Temple in Jerusalem after it was rebuilt after the end of the Babylonian captivity. His reign is estimated to have been from c. 410–371 BCE; he was succeeded by his son Jaddua. The Hebrew Bible gives no details about his life. Johanan lived in the province of Yehud Medinata in the Achaemenid Empire during the reigns of emperors Darius II (423–405 or 404 BCE) and his son Artaxerxes II (404–358 BCE).

== Murder in the Temple ==
Josephus records that Johanan's brother Joshua was promised the high priesthood by Bagoas, general of Artaxerxes. Joshua got into a quarrel with Johanan in the temple, and Johanan killed him. Bagoas knew that Johanan had slain Joshua in the temple, saying to him, "Have you had the impudence to perpetrate murder in the temple." Bagoas was forbidden to enter the temple, but he entered anyway saying "Am not I purer than he that was slain in the temple?" Bagoas had not seen such a savage crime and responded by commanding the Persians to punish the Jews for seven years. His son Jaddua eventually took over the position when Johanan died, as briefly mentioned by Josephus and is mentioned in the book of Nehemiah 12:22.

== Archaeology ==
=== Letter from Elephantine papyri ===
Among the Elephantine papyri and ostraca, a collection of 5th century BCE manuscripts from the Jewish community at Elephantine in Achaemenid Egypt, a letter was found in which Johanan is mentioned. The letter is dated "the 20th of Marcheshvan, year 17 of king Darius", which corresponds to 407 BCE. It is addressed to Bagoas, governor of Yehuda Medinata, and is a request for the rebuilding of the temple to Yahweh at Elephantine; Egyptians had destroyed the previous one. "We have also sent a letter before now, when this evil was done to us, to our lord and to the high priest Johanan and his colleagues, the priests in Jerusalem and to Ostanes, the brother of Anani and the nobles of the Jews, Never a letter have they sent to us." It has been suggested that the Anani that is referred to here might be the same as in 1 Chronicles 3:24.

=== Yohanan coin ===
On a silver coin from the late Achaemenid Empire, Dan Barag and other scholars have identified the Hebrew phrase יחנן הכהן ("Yoḥānān the priest"). This coin is a part of the Yehud coinage.

Because it is generally dated between 350 BCE and Alexander the Great's conquest of Persia around 333 BCE, the coin is usually attributed to a second high priest called Johanan, who is not mentioned in the Bible. Thus, the coin seems to lend support to the hypothesis by Frank Moore Cross from 1975 that there were two subsequent father/son pairs of high priests called Johanan and Jaddua, the latter pair of which was accidentally omitted from the biblical text because of haplography. However, Lisbeth Fried has challenged this late dating of the coin and has suggested a date between 378 and 368 BCE. She believes that the coin refers to the same individual as the one mentioned in Josephus and Nehemiah, and that it is unnecessary to propose a second Johanan.

According to the research published in 2023, the Johanan coin (Yehud coin Type 25) belongs to the "Series with facing head/owl" Types 24 to 28 (YHD-24 to YHD-28). Thus, this coin comes in the middle of the coinage belonging to the Macedonian period.

== Name ==
There is dispute over his actual name. Neh 12:11 lists him as Jonathan, while 12:22 mentions Joiada's successor as Johanan. Josephus also lists him as Johanan (John).

According to the Anchor Bible Dictionary there is also a dispute regarding the genealogy of Johanan. Neh 12:10–11 lists Johanan as the grandson of Eliashib while Neh 12:23 identifies him as the son of Eliashib. "Although it is possible that Heb ben is to be translated as 'grandson' in Neh 12:23; cf. NEB, JB)"

There is yet to be extrabiblical proof that a man named Jonathan ever served as high priest. This has led many to believe that the biblical text has a copy mistake.

== Patrilineal Ancestry ==
Patrilineal descent
1. Abraham
2. Isaac
3. Jacob
4. Levi
5. Kehath
6. Amram
7. Aaron
8. Eleazar
9. Phinehas
10. Abishua
11. Bukki
12. Uzzi
13. Zerahiah
14. Meraioth
15. Azariah
16. Amariah
17. Ahitub
18. Zadok
19. Ahimaaz
20. Azariah
21. Yohanan
22. Azariah II
23. Amariah
24. Ahitub
25. Zadok II
26. Shallum
27. Hilkiah
28. Azariah IV
29. Seraiah
30. Jehozadak
31. Joshua the High Priest
32. Joiakim
33. Eliashib
34. Joiada

== See also ==
- List of biblical figures identified in extra-biblical sources

Jewish titles
Preceded by Joiada	High Priest of Israel; Late 5th or early 4th century BC	Succeeded by Jaddua
