= Ben Sira =

2nd-century BCE Jewish scribe, author of Sirach

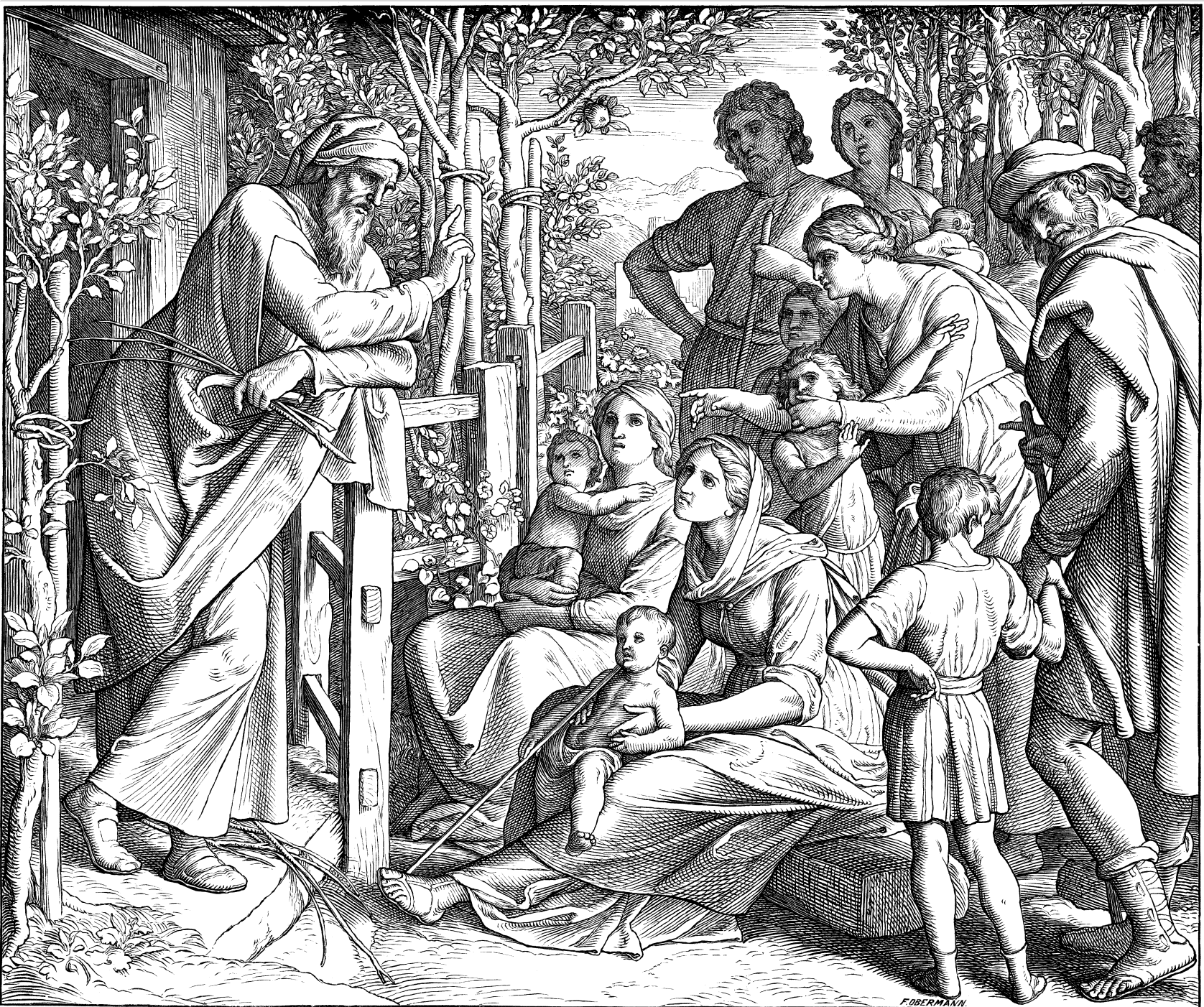
Jesus Ben Sirach 1860 woodcut by Julius Schnorr von Carolsfeld

Simon Ben Jesus Ben Eliezer ben Sira, better known as Ben Sira, also called Ben Sirach, Jesus ben Sira, Jeshua ben Sira, or Sirach (Hebrew: שמעון בן יהושע בן אליעזר בן סירא, romanized: Šīmʿōn ben Yəhōšuaʿ ben ʾĔliʿezer ben Sirāʾ; fl. 2nd century BCE) was a Hellenistic Jewish scribe, sage, and allegorist from Seleucid-controlled Jerusalem of the Second Temple period. He is the author of the Book of Sirach, also known as "Ecclesiasticus".

Ben Sira wrote his work in Hebrew, possibly in Alexandria in the Ptolemaic Kingdom c. 180–175 BCE, where he is thought to have established a school.

While Ben Sira is sometimes claimed to be a contemporary of Simeon the Just, it is more likely that his contemporary was High Priest Simon II (219–199 BCE) and this is due to confusion with his father, Joshua.

A medieval text, the Alphabet of Sirach, was falsely attributed to him.

== In the Koine Greek text ==
In the Koine Greek text of the Book of Sirach, the author, whom the translator claims was his grandfather, is called "Jesus (Joshua) the son of Sirach of Jerusalem" (Greek: Ἰησοῦς υἱὸς Σειρὰχ Ἱεροσολυμίτης). Jesus, otherwise rendered Joshua, is the Anglicized form of the Greek name Ἰησοῦς, corresponding to the Hebrew name Yehoshua and its later form Yeshua, which was also used in Aramaic.

The copy owned by Saadia Gaon, the prominent rabbi, Jewish philosopher, and exegete of the 10th century, had the reading "Shimʽon, son of Yeshuaʽ, son of Elʽazar ben Siraʼ" (שמעון בן ישוע בן אלעזר בן סירא); and a similar reading occurs in the Hebrew manuscript B.

Sirach is the Greek form of the Hebrew or Aramaic family name Sira. It adds the letter Chi, an addition like that in Akeldama(ch) in Acts 1:19, possibly serving as a sign that the name is indeclinable in Greek.

== Life ==
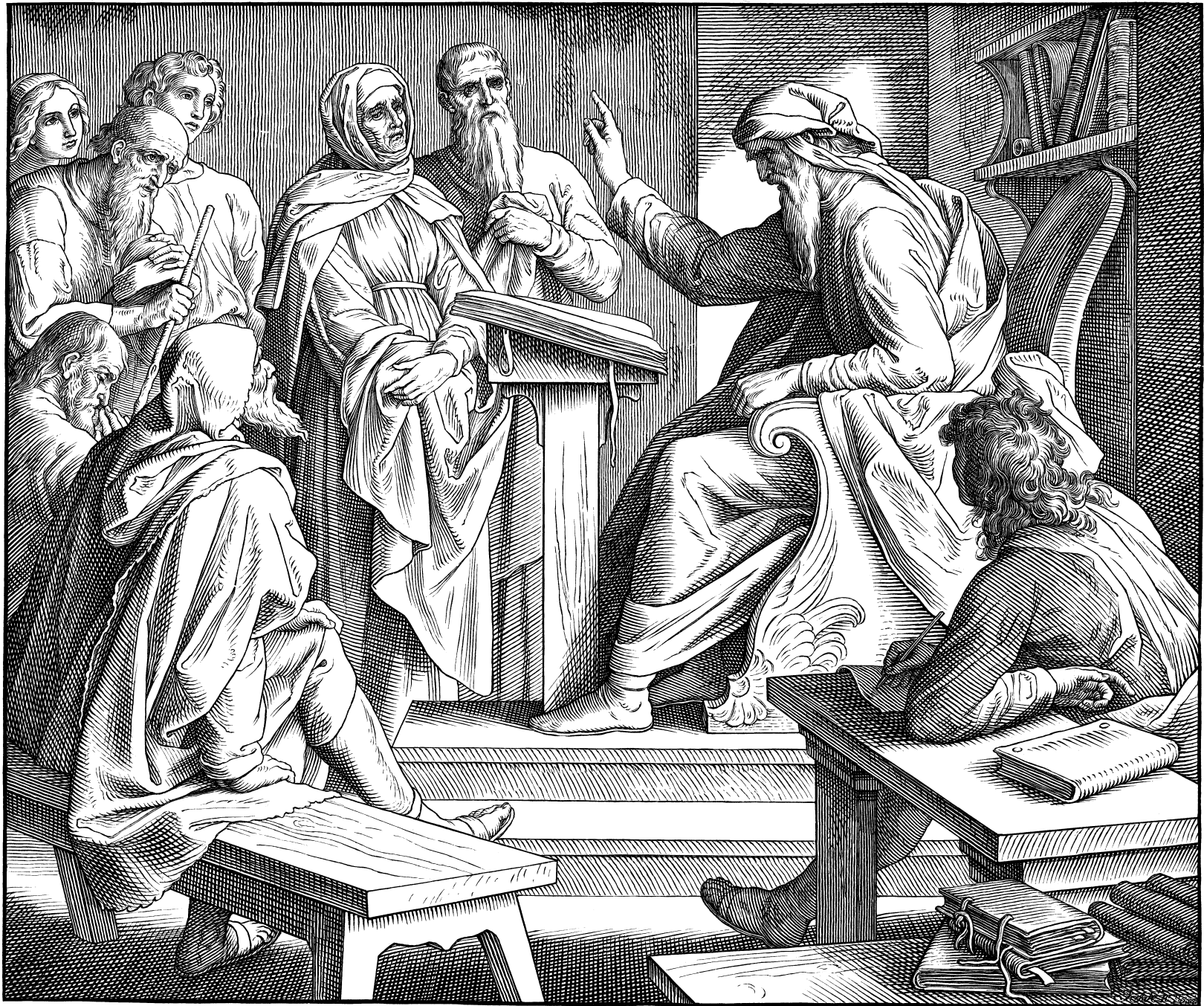
Ben Sirach (Schnorr von Carolsfeld 1860)

According to the Greek version, though not according to the Syriac, the author traveled extensively (Sirach 34:12) and was frequently in danger of death (34:13). Collins comments that unfortunately "he gives no details of his travels". Corley surmises from these travels that Ben Sira may have been a diplomat or counsellor. In the hymn of chapter 51, he speaks of the perils of all sorts from which God had delivered him, although this is probably only a poetic theme in imitation of the Psalms. The calumnies to which he was exposed in the presence of a certain king, supposed to be one of the Ptolemaic dynasty, are mentioned only in the Greek version, being ignored both in the Syriac and in the Hebrew text. The only fact known with certainty, drawn from the text itself, is that Ben Sira was a scholar and a scribe thoroughly versed in the Law, and especially in the "Books of Wisdom".

== Ben Sira's grandson ==
Very little is known about his grandson, who claims in the prologue to the Greek text to be the translator of Sirach into Greek. He probably undertook the translation many years after the original was written.

The grandson states that he came to Egypt in the thirty-eighth year of the reign of Euergetes. Ptolemy VIII Physcon must be intended; he ascended the throne in 170 BCE, together with his brother Philometor, but he soon became sole ruler of Cyrene, and from 146 to 117 BCE, held sway over all Egypt. He dated his reign from the year in which he received the crown (i.e., from 170 BCE). The translator must therefore have gone to Egypt in 132 BCE.

The prologue is generally considered the earliest witness to a canon of the books of the prophets.

== See also ==
- Wisdom literature
- Wisdom (personification)
