= Simeon the Just =

High Priest of Israel

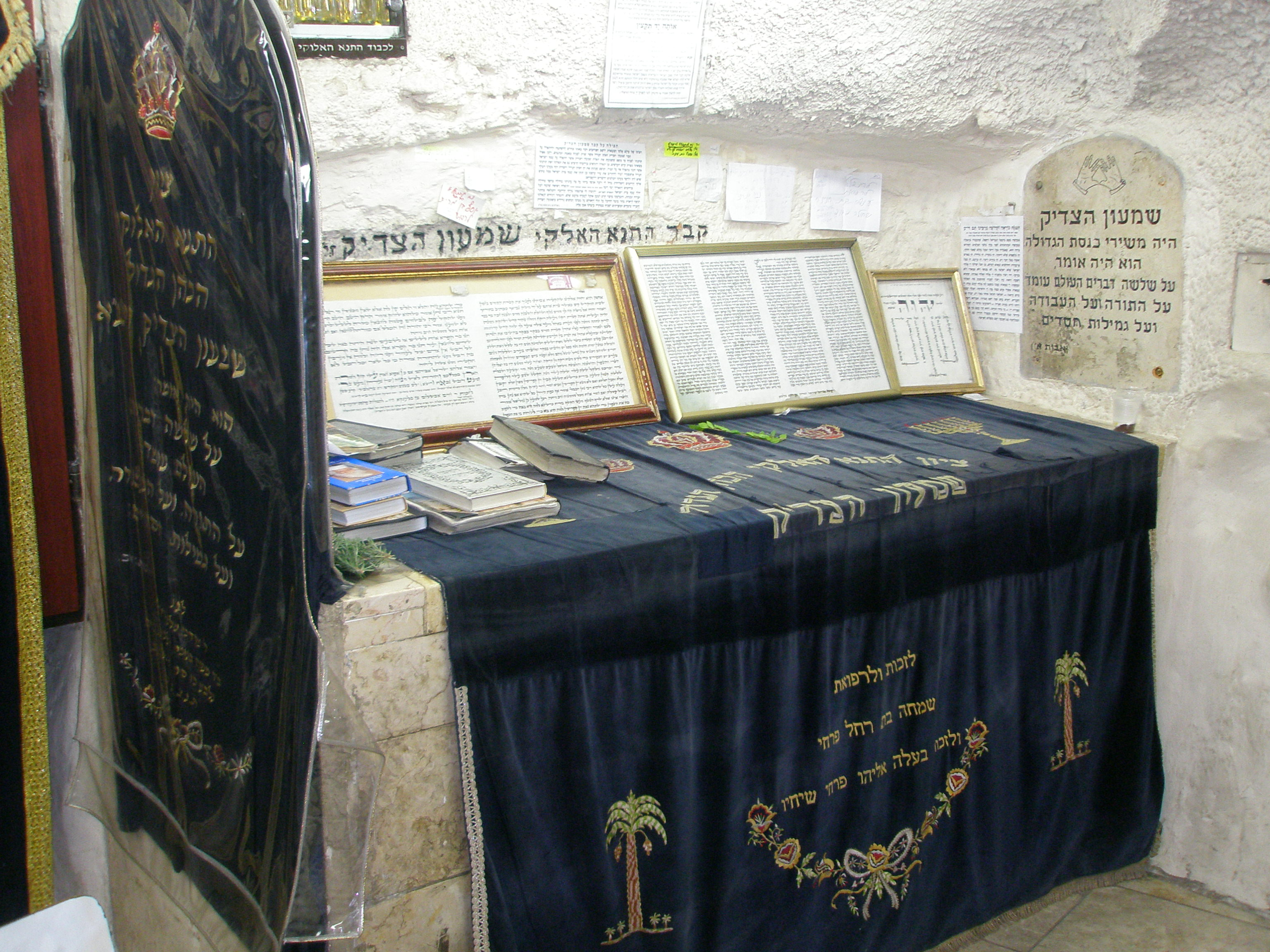
Traditional Tomb of Simon the Just, Jerusalem

Simeon the Righteous or Simeon the Just (Hebrew: שִׁמְעוֹן הַצַּדִּיק, romanized: Šimʿōn Haṣṣaddīq) was a Jewish High Priest during the Second Temple period. He is also referred to in the Mishnah as one of the last members of the Great Assembly.

The Talmud, Josephus, and the Book of Sirach all contain accounts of him. He was termed "the Righteous" because of the piety of his life and his benevolence toward his compatriots. He was deeply interested in the spiritual and material development of the nation. According to Sirach, he rebuilt the walls of Jerusalem, which had been torn down by Pharaoh Ptolemy I Soter, and repaired the damage done to the Temple in Jerusalem, raising the foundation-walls of its court and enlarging the cistern into a pool.

== Biography ==
According to Josephus, Simeon the Righteous is Simon I (310–291 or 300–273 BCE), son of Onias I, and grandson of Jaddua. Many statements concerning him are variously ascribed by scholars, ancient and modern, to four different persons who bore the same name: Simeon I (by Fränkel and Heinrich Graetz); Simeon II (by Nachman Krochmal in the 18th century, Nehemiah Brüll in the 19th, and George Foot Moore and Solomon Zeitlin in the 20th); Simon Maccabeus (by Löw); or Simeon the son of Gamaliel (by Weiss). The scholarly consensus of the late 20th century has fallen on Simon II.

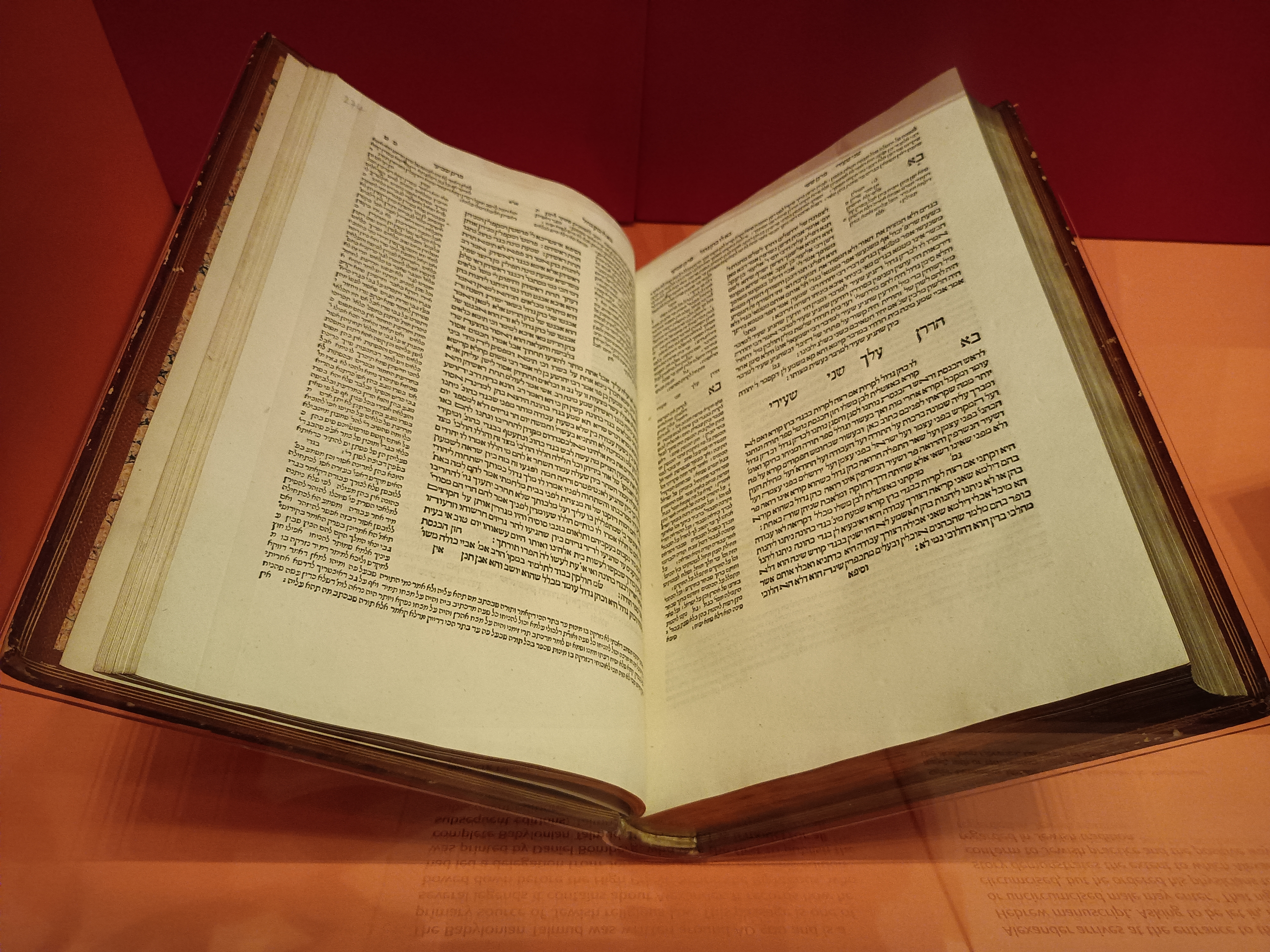
Daniel Bomberg's printed Babylonian Talmud (1520–1523), open to the extract covering Simeon's meeting with Alexander the Great

According to the Talmud, when Alexander the Great marched through the Land of Israel in the year 332 BCE, Simeon the Just, dressed in his priestly garments went to Antipatris to meet him, though Josephus stated that Alexander himself came to Jerusalem. As soon as Alexander saw him, he descended from his chariot and bowed respectfully before him. When Alexander's courtiers criticized this act, he replied that it had been intentional, since he had had a vision in which he had seen the high priest, who had predicted his victory. Alexander demanded that a statue of himself be placed in the Temple, but the high priest explained that this was impossible. He promised instead that all the sons born of priests in that year would be named Alexander. Josephus relates the same story, but identifies the high priest in the story as Jaddua rather than Simon. This story appears to be identical with 3 Maccabees 2, where Seleucus (Kasgalgas) is mentioned. This account is almost certainly apocryphal.

He was an opponent of the Nazirites and ate of the sacrifice offered by that sect only on a single occasion. Once a youth with flowing hair came to him and wished to have his head shorn. When asked his motive, the youth replied that he had seen his own face reflected in a spring and it had pleased him so that he feared his beauty might become an idol to him. He therefore wished to offer up his hair to God, and Simeon then partook of the sin-offering which he brought. According to the Mishnah, Antigonus of Sokho was a disciple of Simeon.

== Priesthood ==
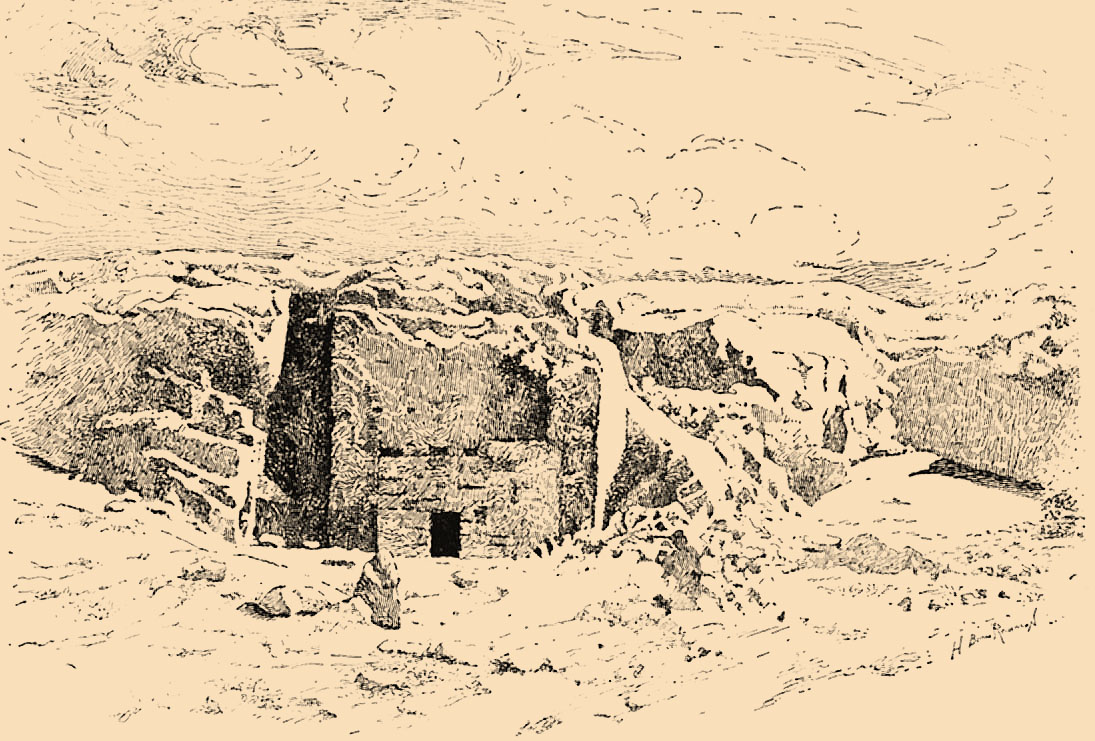
Traditional Tomb of Simeon the Just, Jewish Encyclopedia (1906–1913)

During Simeon's administration, seven miracles are said to have occurred. A blessing rested (1) on the offering of the first fruits, (2) on the two sacrificial loaves, and (3) on the loaves of showbread, in that, although each priest received a portion no larger than an olive, he ate and was satiated without even consuming the whole of it; (4) the lot cast for God always came into the right hand; (5) the red thread around the neck of the goat or ram became white on Yom Kippur; (6) the light in the Temple never failed; and (7) the fire on the altar required but little wood to keep it burning.

The Mishnah records that during the priesthood of Simeon the Just, two red heifers were burnt at the sacrificial place built on the Mount of Olives.

Simeon is said to have held office for forty years. On a certain Yom Kippur he came from the Holy of Holies in a sad mood, and when asked the reason, he replied that on every Yom Kippur a figure clothed in white had ushered him into the Holy of Holies and then had escorted him out. This time, however, the apparition had been clothed in black and had conducted him in, but had not led him out, a sign that this year was to be his last. He is said to have fallen ill soon after, for seven days, and died after Sukkot.

== Commemoration ==
His personality, and the high esteem in which he was held, are shown by a poem in Sirach which compares him, at the moment of his exit from the Holy of Holies, to the sun, moon, and stars, and to the most magnificent plants. This poem appeared with certain changes in the Yom Kippur mussaf service, known by the title Mareh Kohen.

Without the presence of Shimon HaTzaddik among them, the Jewish people were no longer worthy of the miracles that had occurred during his lifetime. For this reason, following his death, the priests, refrained from blessing the Jewish people with the explicit name of God, the Tetragrammaton in the priestly blessing.

== Quotes ==
- "The world exists through three things: the [Torah] Law, Service [Temple sacrifice, later replaced by prayer], and acts of loving kindness."

== See also ==
- Tomb of Simeon the Just
