= Eliashib (High Priest) =

High Priest of Israel

Eliashib (Hebrew: אֶלְיָשִׁיב ’Elyāšîḇ, "El restores") the High Priest is mentioned in Nehemiah 12:10,22 and 3:1, 20-21,13:28 and possibly the Book of Ezra of the Hebrew Bible as (grand)father (Nehemiah 12:22) of the high priest Johanan (Ezra 10:6). Some also place him in different parts of Nehemiah including 12:23 and 13:4,7, but this is disputed. Nehemiah 3:20-21 places his home between the area of two working groups constructing the walls of Jerusalem on the south side of the city. He helped with the refortification of this wall (Neh 3:1). The size of his house indicated his wealth and high socio-economic status (Neh 3:23-21). This places him as someone who lived during the time of Nehemiah. In the year 445 BCE, Eliashib was the high priest when Nehemiah returned to Jerusalem in the 20th year of Artaxerxes I (Nehemiah 1:1, 2:1).

Josephus puts Eliashib as a contemporary of Ezra during the reign of Xerxes, in Ant. 11.5,6-8. He also dates his reign as high priest through the reign of Cyrus the Younger, who Josephus mentions is "also called by the Greeks, Artaxerxes". Josephus outlines this story in Antiq. 11:185- Antiq 11:297. The last quotation of this story states, "When Eliasib the high priest was dead, his son Judas succeeded in the high priesthood."(Antiq 11:297)

Eliashib's grandson was married to a relative of Sanballat the Horonite (Neh 13:28) and, while Nehemiah was absent in Babylon, Eliashib had leased the storerooms of the Second Temple to Sanballat's associate Tobiah the Ammonite. When Nehemiah returned he threw Tobiah's furniture out of the temple and drove out Eliashib's grandson (Neh 13:4-9). According to David Kimhi, this is the political background to the allegorical vision of Satan, the Angel of the Lord and Eliashib's (possibly deceased) grandfather Joshua the High Priest in Zechariah 3.

== Patrilineal Ancestry ==
As per 1 Chronicles chapter 5

Patrilineal descent
1. Abraham
2. Isaac
3. Jacob
4. Levi
5. Kehath
6. Amram
7. Aaron
8. Eleazar
9. Phinehas
10. Abishua
11. Bukki
12. Uzzi
13. Zerahiah
14. Meraioth
15. Azariah
16. Amariah
17. Ahitub
18. Zadok
19. Ahimaaz
20. Azariah
21. Yohanan
22. Azariah II
23. Amariah
24. Ahitub
25. Zadok II
26. Shallum
27. Hilkiah
28. Azariah IV
29. Seraiah
30. Jehozadak
31. Joshua the High Priest
32. Joiakim
