= Joiakim (High Priest) =

High Priest of Israel

Joiakim (Note: Hebrew: יוֹיָקִים Yoyaqim, "Yahweh raises up".) is the name of a priest mentioned in the Hebrew Bible, in Deuterocanonical books, and in later extra-biblical sources. Reconstructing his role in history is complicated by a variety of claims made in these texts. The chronology of Joiakim's tenure as priest has been the subject of dispute, as has the question of whether Joiakim was high priest. The Hebrew Bible, which mentions Joiakim only in the Book of Nehemiah, Chapter 12, does not call him "high priest," though Josephus does use the term for him.

The mystery surrounding the identity of Joiakim is rather convoluted. There are some conflicts between early sources on Joiakim. In addition, while the history of Josephus (Antiq. 11:121) mentions Joiakim (or "Joacim"), it does not include many details regarding his identity or role.

== Hebrew Bible and Deuterocanonical literature ==
In the Nehemiah 12:10, Joiakim is identified as the son of Joshua the High Priest. In verse 12 the expression "days of Jehoiakim" is used to denote a particular time period, and in verse 26 the "days of Jehoiakim" is equated with the days of Ezra and Nehemiah. Interpreters have disagreed as to whether this language implies that Joiakim was regarded as the high priest by the author of Nehemiah. However, "this list is artificial and problematic, but its existence reflects the importance of priests and Levites in this period."

In 1 Esdras 3:9; 5:5, a Joiakim is referred to as the son of Zerubbabel. The Esdras genealogy of Zerubbabel's sons is considered to be highly confused. 1 Chronicles 3:19 does not mention Joiakim as son of Zerubbabel, and there is no reference to Joiakim's role as a priest.

Judith 4:6-7; 4:8; 4:14; 15:8 names a Joiakim as a High Priest who hold religious and military authority. It is unclear whether the Jehoiakim mentioned in Judith is intended to be the same individual referred to in Nehemiah 12. Because there is no evidence that a high priest would exercise such a wide range of powers, some scholars believe that the Joiakim of Judith may be a pseudonym for a person from either the Hasmonean dynasty period, the time of Trajan or Hadrian, or as a "representative figure of the priesthood in general." The traditional Roman Catholic view is that the book dates to the reign of Manasseh of Judah and he left many of his affairs to the high priest either during his captivity or after his repentance.

An additional chapter to the book of Daniel mentions a Joiakim as the husband of Susanna, a very rich man living in Babylon and the most honored Jew of them all. However, according to the New Oxford Annotated Bible, it appears that this Joiakim is not connected to other Joaikims in the Bible (confirmed by Josephus).

== Josephus ==
Joiakim may have aided in the rebuilding of the Second Temple, if he was a son of Joshua. Joiakim is also labeled as a contemporary of Ezra Joiakim and Esdras may even have worked alongside on another, filling the Priestly role; Joiakim is called the "High Priest" while Ezra is referred to as the "Principal Priest of the People". Due to the prominent role of Ezra, as evidenced in Ant. 11:120-11:158, theories have been suggested that Ezra replaced Joiakim as High Priest. Josephus concluded the following, "And it was his [Ezra's] fate, after being honoured by the people, to die an old man to be buried with great magnificence in Jerusalem. About the same time also died the high priest Joakeimos, whom his son Eliashib succeeded in the high priesthood The combination of 1 Esdras and the way Josephus interpreted certain biblical passages, led him to believe Joiakim and Ezra were contemporaries. Josephus also took liberties to fill in the gaps between Ezra 6 and 7, "in which one jumps from the reign of Darius I (522-486 BCE) to that of Artaxerxes I (465-424 BCE), by relating the Ezra story to the days of the intervening monarch Xerxes. For this maneuver, he found support in Nehemiah 12, which seems to make Ezra the contemporary of the second high priest Joiakim who very likely served during Xerxes' reign."

== Patrilineal Ancestry ==
As per 1 Chronicles chapter 5

Patrilineal descent
1. Abraham
2. Isaac
3. Jacob
4. Levi
5. Kehath
6. Amram
7. Aaron
8. Eleazar
9. Phinehas
10. Abishua
11. Bukki
12. Uzzi
13. Zerahiah
14. Meraioth
15. Azariah
16. Amariah
17. Ahitub
18. Zadok
19. Ahimaaz
20. Azariah
21. Yohanan
22. Azariah II
23. Amariah
24. Ahitub
25. Zadok II
26. Shallum
27. Hilkiah
28. Azariah IV
29. Seraiah
30. Jehozadak
31. Joshua the High Priest
32. Joiakim
