= Hilkiah =

Hebrew priest at the time of King Josiah

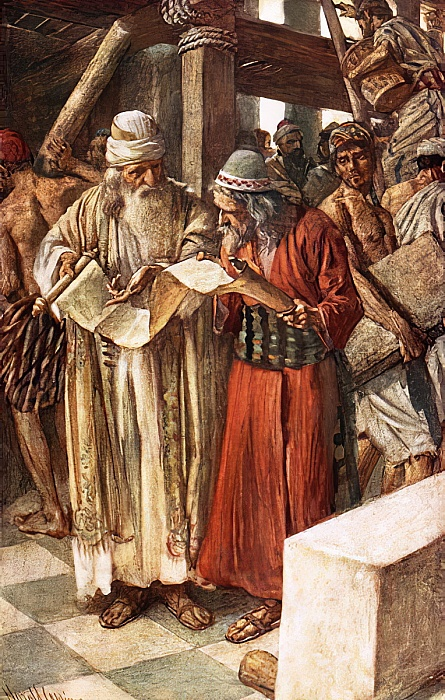
An illustration of Hilkiah finding the Book of Laws in Harold Copping's The Copping Bible, 1910

Hilkiah (Hebrew: חִלְקִיָּה(וּ), romanized: Ḥilqiyyā(hu), lit. 'my portion is Yahweh') was a Kohen (an Israelite priest) at the time of King Josiah (reigned c. 641–609 BCE).

== Biblical account ==
His name is mentioned in II Kings. He was the High Priest and is known for finding a lost copy of the Book of the Law at the Temple in Jerusalem at the time that King Josiah commanded that Solomon's Temple be refurbished according to 2 Kings 22:8. His preaching may have helped spur Josiah to return Judah to the worship of Yahweh, God of Israel.

Hilkiah may have been the same Hilkiah who was the father of Jeremiah of Libnah. As such, he would have lived in Anathoth in the land of Benjamin, and was the father of an influential family in the Kingdom of Judah. However, it is possible that Jeremiah was the son of a different man named Hilkiah because this is not mentioned in genealogies recorded in the Book of Chronicles.

Hilkiah is attested in extrabiblical sources by the clay bulla naming a Hilkiah as the father of an Azariah and by the seal reading "Hanan son of Hilkiah the priest."

== The Book of the Law ==
According to an account in 2 Kings (chapter 22) and 2 Chronicles (chapter 34), Hilkiah was High Priest at the Temple in Jerusalem during the reign of King Josiah of Judah (639–609 BC) and the discoverer of "the Book of the Law" in the Temple in the 18th year of Josiah's reign (622 BC). Scholars almost universally agree that the book Hilkiah found was the Book of Deuteronomy.

== Extra-biblical sources ==
Hilkiah's name is mentioned on a seal ring and a bulla. The first object where his name is mentioned is a seal ring found in 1980. On the seal is a three-line inscription, in reverse letters, as is usual, so that the letters will read properly when impressed in a lump of clay. The script incised in the seal is what scholars call paleo-Hebrew, used by the Israelites before the Babylonian captivity, before the destruction of Jerusalem in 586 BC. The inscription reads: "(Belonging) to Hanan, son (of) Hilkiah the priest". It begins with the Hebrew letter lamed, meaning "belonging to", indicating the seal's ownership. Then the name of the seal's owner, the name of his father and the function of the seal's owner. Written in the paleo-Hebrew alphabet, it is part of a larger group of artifacts known as Canaanite and Aramaic seal inscriptions.

The second object is a bulla found in Jerusalem in 1982. A bulla was used to seal a document. The document's owner took a lump of soft clay; he affixed the clay to the string binding the document and then stamped it with his seal. This bulla was one of the fifty-one bullae discovered during excavations in the eastern slope of Jerusalem in a dated archaeological context. This collection of bullae was found in level 10, dated between Josiah's rule and the destruction of the city by the Babylonian king Nebuchadnezzar II in 586 BC, and more precisely from the highest ground of the building (level 10B). This level was destroyed by the final burning which baked the bullae and provided a better conservation. On one bulla is a two-line inscription, in paleo-Hebrew script as on the seal. The inscription reads: "(Belonging) to Azaryah, son (of) Hilkiah". The inscription indicates the name of the seal's owner and the name of his father, but not his function.

=== Azariah and Hanan, sons of Hilkiah ===
Azaryah and Hanan, sons of Hilkiah, both held a sacerdotal function in the Temple of Jerusalem. In the late roster of high priests referred to in 1 Chronicles (6:13, 9:11), Azaryah IV was the successor of Hilkiah in this function and probably his eldest son, while his other son, Hanan, served by his side as a priest. The seals of the two brothers Hanan and Azaryah, engraved by the same master engraver, belong to what has been called the "generation of sons" and date, not from Josiah's reign but from one of his successors' (before 586). The seal of Azaryah was made before he became high priest because his function is not mentioned on it. The seal of Hanan and the bulla of Azaryah, two sons of the high priest Hilkiah, represent testimonies of the last years of Solomon's Temple, the first Temple of Jerusalem, before its destruction by Nebuchadnezzar II in 586.

== Patrilineal Ancestry ==
As per 1 Chronicles chapter 6

Patrilineal descent
1. Abraham
2. Isaac
3. Jacob
4. Levi
5. Kehath
6. Amram
7. Aaron
8. Eleazar
9. Phinehas
10. Abishua
11. Bukki
12. Uzzi
13. Zerahiah
14. Meraioth
15. Azariah
16. Amariah
17. Ahitub
18. Zadok
19. Ahimaaz
20. Azariah
21. Yohanan
22. Azariah II
23. Amariah
24. Ahitub
25. Zadok II
26. Shallum
27. Hilkiah

== See also ==
- List of biblical figures identified in extra-biblical sources
- Eliakim, son of Hilkiah

Israelite religious titles
Preceded by Shallum	High Priest of Israel circa 600s BC	Succeeded by Azariah IV
