= Zadok =

Biblical character

- צָדוֹק (Hebrew)
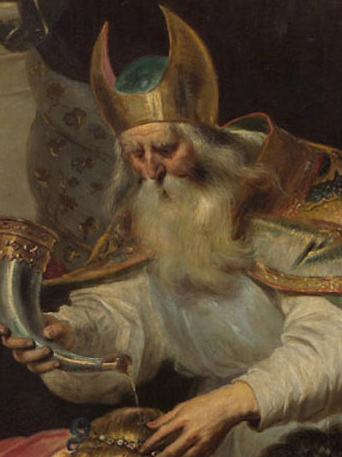
- Detail of Zadok in The Anointing of Solomon (c. 1630) by Cornelis de Vos

Religious life
- Religion: Abrahamic religions

Zadok (/ˈzeɪdɒk/), also spelled Ṣadok, Ṣadoc, Zadoq, Tzadok or Tsadoq (Hebrew: צָדוֹק הַכֹּהֵן, romanized: Ṣādōq ha-Kōhēn; lit. 'righteous, justified'), was a Kohen (priest), biblically recorded to be a descendant of Eleazar the son of Aaron. He was the High Priest of Israel during the reigns of David and Solomon as kings of Israel. He aided King David during the revolt of his son Absalom, was subsequently instrumental in bringing Solomon to the throne, and officiated at Solomon's coronation. After Solomon's building of the First Temple in Jerusalem, Zadok was the first High Priest to serve there.

The prophet Ezekiel extols the sons of Zadok as staunch opponents of paganism during the era of pagan worship, and indicates their birthright to unique duties and privileges in the future temple.

== Hebrew Bible ==
The Tanakh (Hebrew Bible) states that Zadok was a patrilineal descendant of Eleazar the son of Aaron the high priest. The lineage of Zadok is presented in the genealogy of Ezra (his descendant) as being of ninth generation of direct patrilineal descent from Phinehas the son of Eleazar.

A certain Zadok had been one of those who joined David at Hebron and helped him win the crown of all Israel, his house then including twenty-two captains. Josephus identifies this Zadok with the high priest of the same name.

During the rebellion of Absalom, Zadok the priest is mentioned, as he and the Levites wished to accompany the fleeing David and bring along the Ark of the Covenant, but the king instructed Zadok to remain at Jerusalem, where he and Abiathar could do him better service, so that it actually happened that Ahimaaz, the son of Zadok, along with Jonathan, the son of Abiathar, brought the fleeing king a life saving message. In all these passages Zadok is mentioned in precedence to Abiathar. Zadok was also chief officer over the Aaronites. The term high priest is not used in the Hebrew scriptures from the time of Joshua until the reign of Joash.

Both Zadok and Abiathar functioned in tandem as priests at the time of David's hasty exit from Jerusalem. When David first set up his cabinet, Zadok and Abiathar, the son of Ahimelech, were named as priests. On the suppression of the Absalom rebellion, King David sent Zadok and Abiathar to the elders of Judah, urging them to hasten to bring the monarch back. Subsequently, when Adonijah endeavored to secure the throne, Abiathar sided with him, leading King Solomon (David's son) to expel him from Jerusalem and reinforce the sole chief-priesthood of Zadok, who, along with Nathan the Prophet, supported King Solomon's accession to throne. In gratitude, Solomon appointed him sole high priest. Zadok also officiated at the anointing ceremony of Solomon as king.

In 1 Chronicles 16:39 Zadok is named as the leader of the priests who served "before the tabernacle of the Lord at the high place that was at Gibeon", although he is later recorded as working alongside Ahimelech devising a schedule of priestly service to support David's preparations for the construction of the Temple in Jerusalem.

Zadok's sons were Ahimaaz and Azariah. His descendants who held the high priesthood up to the destruction of the First Temple and, following the building of the Second Temple, resumed the high priesthood, as per Joshua the High Priest (along with Ezra) being of Zadokite lineage.

== The Zadokite dynasty ==
=== In rabbinic literature ===
According to the Bible, Aaron received a perpetual priestly covenant by which his descendants, and only his descendants, would be priests.

According to some commentaries, the priesthood was further restricted to descendants of Aaron's son Eleazar after Eleazar inherited Aaron's priestly robes (Numbers 20:24–28), and further restricted to descendants of Eleazar's son Pinchas after Pinchas performed his act of zealotry.

Nevertheless, later on the high priesthood was held by Eli, a descendant of Itamar (Eleazar's brother). Torah commentators attribute this to Pinchas' later sins. But upon the sin of Eli's sons, Hophni and Phinehas, a "man of God" prophesied the extinction of their priesthood:

And I will erect myself a reliable priest (who acts) with my heart, and with my soul he will do, and I will build him a reliable household, and he will go before my Anointed all of days.

This prophecy was fulfilled when Zadok, who was descended from Eleazar and Pinchas, was appointed as high priest.

=== History of Zadokites ===
Historical data show that the high-priesthood remained in the progeny of the Zadokites from the time of Zadok up until the rise of the Hasmoneans, in about 167 BCE. The descendants of Zadok increased in rank and influence, so that his son Azariah was one of the princes of Solomon (1 Kings 4:2) and Ahimaaz, who married a daughter of Solomon, was probably another of Zadok's sons (1 Kings 4:15). Either Zadok himself or his grandson was the ruler of the Aaronite priests (1 Chronicles 27:17), and Jerusha, the mother of Jotham, is apparently termed the daughter of Zadok to emphasize her noble lineage, since her father may have been a descendant of the first Zadok (2 Kings 15:33; 2 Chronicles 27:1).

The house of Zadok occupied the high priesthood through much of the Second Temple period, from Jehoshua ben Jehozadak after the Exile, down to Simon II (Simon the Just, much praised in Ben Sira 50), his eldest son Onias III, and his usurping second son Jason, who introduced the programme of Hellenisation that eventually led to the Maccabean Revolt.

Josephus records that Onias IV went to Leontopolis in the Egyptian nome of Heliopolis with a significant following, and for lending military support to the Ptolemaic Pharaoh was given land to build a rival temple to the one in Jerusalem (although Josephus also ascribes this to Onias III, while dating the project so as to suggest Onias II). It has been suggested that Onias or members of his Zadokite house may have also founded the community at Qumran.

== Other theories about Zadok ==
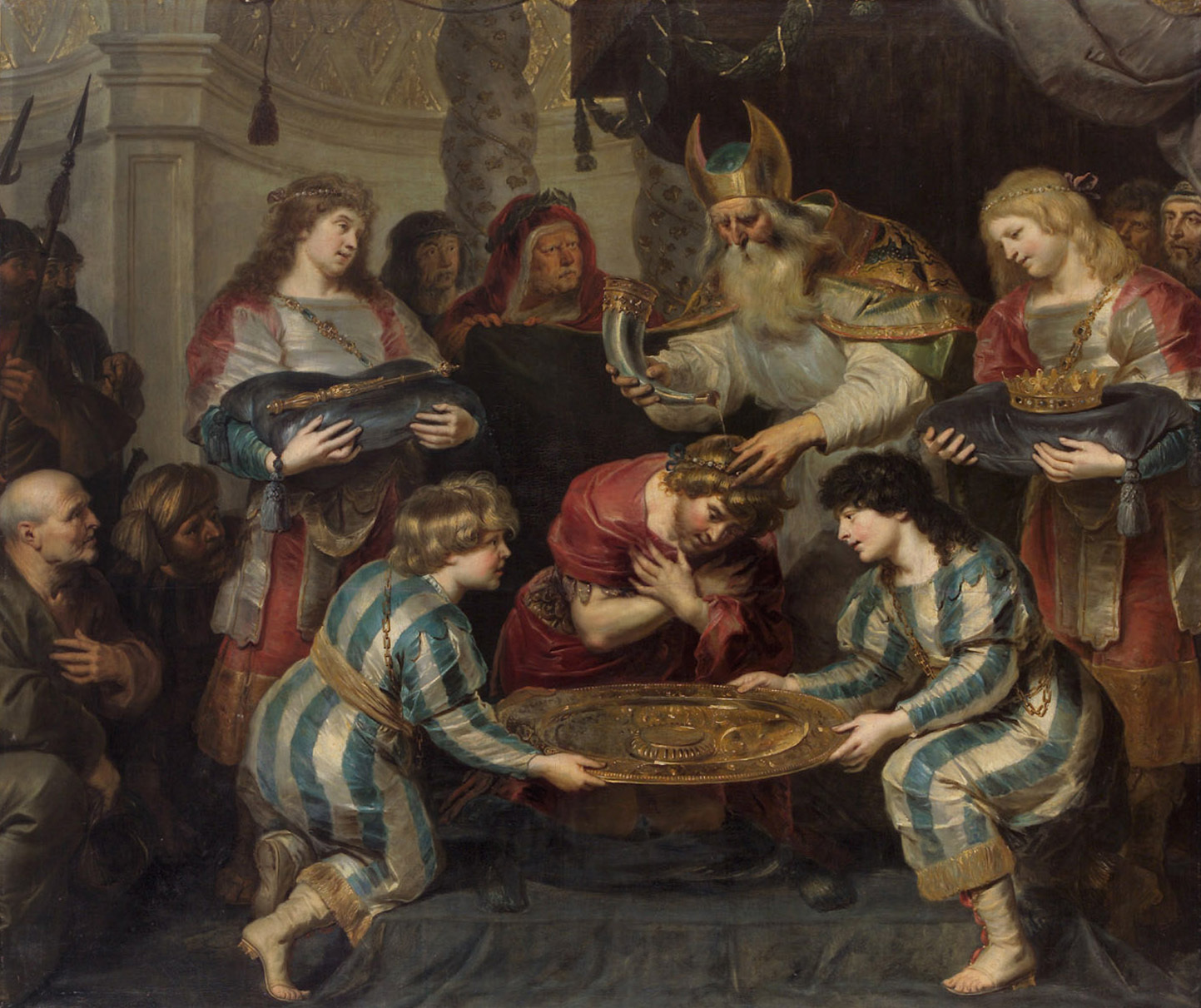
The Anointing of Solomon by Cornelis de Vos. According to 1 Kings 1:39, Zadok anointed Solomon as king.

Some have speculated that as Zadok does not appear in the text of Samuel until after the conquest of Jerusalem, he was actually a Jebusite priest co-opted into the Israelite state religion. Harvard Divinity School Professor Frank Moore Cross refers to this theory as the "Jebusite Hypothesis", criticising it extensively, although he terms it the dominant view among contemporary scholars.

Elsewhere in the Bible, the Jebusites are described in a manner that suggests that they worshipped the same God (El Elyon) as the Israelites, in the case of Melchizedek. Further support for this theory comes from the fact that other Jebusites or residents of pre-Israelite Jerusalem bore names invoking the principle or god Zedek (Tzedek) (see, for example, the names Melchizedek and Adonizedek). Under this theory the Aaronic lineage ascribed to Zadok is a later, anachronistic interpolation.

== Other Zadoks ==
Abraham Geiger was of the opinion that the Sadducee ("Tzadoki" in Mishnaic pronunciation) sect of Judaism drew their name from Zadok, with the leaders of the sect proposed as the sons of Zadok. However, Rabbinic sources describe the Sadducee and Boethusian groups have originated at the same time, with their founders, Zadok and Boethus, both being students of Antigonus of Sokho (roughly 3rd century BCE).

A Rabbi Zadok, one of the tannaim, is mentioned as saved in Talmud in connection with the destruction of the Second Temple.

== Patrilineal ancestry ==
As per 1 Chronicles chapter 6:

Patrilineal descent
1. Abraham
2. Isaac
3. Jacob
4. Levi
5. Kehath
6. Amram
7. Aaron
8. Eleazar
9. Phinehas
10. Abishua
11. Bukki
12. Uzzi
13. Zerahiah
14. Meraioth
15. Azariah
16. Amariah
17. Ahitub
18. Zadok

== See also ==
- Zadok the Priest (coronation anthem by George Frideric Handel)
- List of High Priests of Israel
- Zadig

Israelite religious titles
Preceded by Abiathar	High Priest of Israel	Succeeded by Ahimaaz
