= Joshua the High Priest =

High Priest of Israel

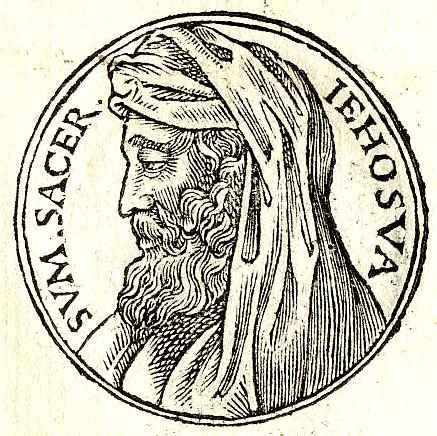
Joshua as imagined by Guillaume Rouille, from his 1553 work containing woodcut portraits in medallion form, Promptuarii Iconum Insigniorum.

Joshua the son of Jehozadak (Hebrew: יְהוֹשֻׁוּעַ Yəhōšūaʿ) (sometimes called Jeshua) was the first High Priest during the reconstruction of the Jewish Temple after the return of the Jews from the Babylonian Captivity.

== Life ==
In the common List of High Priests of Israel, Joshua served as High Priest around 515–490 BCE. (Note: This dating is based on the period of service at age 25–50 (per Numbers 8) rather than age 30–50 (per Numbers 4).)

The biblical text names Joshua among the leaders who inspired a momentum towards the reconstruction of the temple, in Ezra 5:2. Later, some of his sons and nephews are found guilty of intermarriage.

In the Book of Zechariah 3:6–10, Zechariah the prophet experiences a vision given to him by an angel of the Lord in which the restoration and cleansing of Joshua's priestly duties are affirmed. Included in the visions were requirements in which Joshua was expected to uphold. These included: (1) walk in the ways of God, (2) keeping the requirements (the law), (3) ruling God's house, (4) take charge of His courts; by fulfilling these duties, the angel granted access to the inner temple to Joshua and his fellow priest. The vision also functioned to purify Joshua and to sanctify him for the preparations of his priestly duties.

Joshua is also named alongside Persian governor Zerubbabel in the Book of Haggai as the high priest to whom that prophet directed his messages from God. Theologian Albert Barnes observes that "Haggai addresses these two, the one of the royal, the other of the priestly, line, as jointly responsible for the negligence of the people".

== Tomb ==
In 1825, the traditional tomb of Joshua was reported to have been found at "one hour's distance from Baghdad".

== Significance ==
The name Joshua is of the same origin as the name Jesus, and Joshua the High Priest is interpreted by some Christians to be a foreshadowing of Jesus.

== Patrilineal ancestry ==
As per 1 Chronicles chapter 5:

Patrilineal descent
1. Abraham
2. Isaac
3. Jacob
4. Levi
5. Kehath
6. Amram
7. Aaron
8. Eleazar
9. Phinehas
10. Abishua
11. Bukki
12. Uzzi
13. Zerahiah
14. Meraioth
15. Azariah
16. Amariah
17. Ahitub
18. Zadok
19. Ahimaaz
20. Azariah
21. Yohanan
22. Azariah II
23. Amariah
24. Ahitub
25. Zadok II
26. Shallum
27. Hilkiah
28. Azariah IV
29. Seraiah
30. Jehozadak
31. Joshua the High Priest
