= Amariah =

Given name

Amariah (Hebrew: אֲמַרְיָה) means "promised by God" in Hebrew. It was commonly used as a name of priests in the History of ancient Israel and Judah. It appear several times in the Hebrew Bible:

1. One of the descendants of Aaron by Eleazar (1 Chronicles 6:7,52). He was probably the last of the high priests of Eleazar's line prior to the transfer of that office to Eli, of the line of Ithamar.
2. A Levite, son of Hebron, of the lineage of Moses (1 Chronicles 23:19; 24:23).
3. A "chief priest" who took an active part in the reformation under Jehoshaphat (2 Chronicles 19:11); probably the same as mentioned in 1 Chronicles 6:9.
4. An ancestor of Ezra (1 Chronicles 6:11; Ezra 7:3).
5. One of the high priests in the time of Hezekiah (2 Chronicles 31:15).
6. Great-grandfather of Zephaniah (Zephaniah 1:1). A late 8th – early 7th century BCE bulla reading "[belonging to] Amaryahu, son of the King" might refer to him.
7. Great-grandfather of Athaiah (Nehemiah 11:4).
8. One of the persons who sealed the covenant (Nehemiah 10:3).
9. One of the persons who had taken 'strange wives' (Ezra 10:42).

== High Priest ==
Patrilineal ancestry as per 1 Chronicles chapter 5

Patrilineal descent
1. Abraham
2. Isaac
3. Jacob
4. Levi
5. Kehath
6. Amram
7. Aaron
8. Eleazar
9. Phinehas
10. Abishua
11. Bukki
12. Uzzi
13. Zerahiah
14. Meraioth
15. Azariah
16. Amariah
17. Ahitub
18. Zadok
19. Ahimaaz
20. Azariah
21. Yohanan
22. Azariah II
