= Yohanan =

Yohanan יוֹחָנָן (Yôḥānān), sometimes transcribed as Johanan, is a Hebrew male given name that can also appear in the longer form of יְהוֹחָנָן (Yəhôḥānān), meaning "YHWH is gracious".

The name is ancient, recorded as the name of Johanan, high priest of the Second Temple around 400 BCE.

== Adaptations ==
The Hebrew name was adopted as Ἰωάννης (Iōánnēs) in Biblical Greek as the name of both John the Baptist and John the Apostle.

In the Latin Vulgate this was originally adopted as Iohannes (or Johannes – in Latin, J is the same letter as I). The presence of an h, not found in the Greek adaptation, shows awareness of the Hebrew origin. Later editions of the Vulgate, such as the Clementine Vulgate, have Ioannes, however.

The anglicized form John makes its appearance in Middle English, from the mid-12th century, as a direct adaptation from Medieval Latin Johannes, via the Old French Jean. The feminine form Joanna is also biblical, recorded in the form Ἰωάννα as the name of Joanna, wife of Chuza.

The form Johanan, even closer to the Hebrew original than Latin Johannes, is customarily used in English-language translations of the Hebrew Bible (as opposed to John being used in English translations of the New Testament), in a tradition going back to Wycliffe's Bible, which uses John when translating from the Greek (e.g. of John the Baptist in Mark 1:4), but Johannan when translating from the Hebrew (as in Jeremiah 40:8).

== People of that name ==
=== Hebrew Bible (c. 7th – 5th century BCE) ===
- Yohanan, son of King Josiah of Judah (7th century BCE)
- Yohanan, son of Kareah, mentioned as a leader of the army who led the remnant of the population of the Kingdom of Judah to Egypt for safety after the Babylonian dismantling of the kingdom in 586 BC and the subsequent assassination of Gedaliah, the Babylon-appointed Jewish governor.
- Yohanan ben Yehoyada, a high priest mentioned in the Book of Nehemiah who is fourth in the line of high priests after Joshua the High Priest, who returned from the Babylonian captivity with Zerubbabel

=== Hasmonean period ===
- Yohanan, Father of Matityahu
- John Gaddi, oldest of the sons of Mattathias, and brother of Judas Maccabeus, one of the leaders of the revolt of the Maccabees in the 2nd century BC.
- John Hyrcanus, Hasmonean (Maccabean) leader and Jewish high priest of the 2nd century BCE (born 164 BCE, reigned from 134 BCE until his death in 104 BCE).
- John Hyrcanus II (1st century BCE), a member of the Hasmonean dynasty, High Priest, King, and ethnarch of Judea

=== Roman era (c. 1st century BC – 4th century AD) ===
- John the Baptist (late 1st century BC – c. AD 30), a Jewish itinerant preacher and later Christian saint.
- John of Giscala, 1st century CE leader of the Jewish revolt against the Romans in the First Jewish-Roman War.
- Jehohanan, a man put to death by crucifixion in the 1st century CE, whose ossuary was found in 1968 in northern Jerusalem
- John the Apostle, one of the Twelve Apostles of Jesus and possible author of the Johannine works.
- Other possible authors of the Johannine works: John the Evangelist, John of Patmos, John the Presbyter.

==== Rabbinic sages ====
- Yohanan ben Bag-Bag, one of the tannaim (rabbinic sages), who is mentioned several times in the Talmud.
- Johanan ben Baroka, second and third generation Jewish Tanna sage (2nd century).
- Johanan ben Torta, rabbi of the early 2nd century (third generation of tannaim).
- Johanan HaSandlar (c. 200–c. 300), one of the tannaim, whose teachings are quoted in the core text of Rabbinical Judaism, the Mishnah
- Yochanan bar Nappaha (died c. 279), a rabbi in the early era of the Talmud, better known simply as "Rabbi Yohanan"
- Johanan ben Nuri, one of the tannaim of the 1st and 2nd centuries, frequently cited in the Mishnah
- Yohanan ben Zakai (c. 30–90), one of the tannaim, widely regarded as one of the most important Jewish figures in the era of the Second Temple and a primary contributor to the Mishnah

=== Middle ages (4th century – 15th century) ===
- Yohanan, ancestor of the Banu Qaynuqa.
- Johanan Luria, fifteenth century talmudist.

=== Modern period ===
- Yochanan Afek (born 1952), Israeli chess player
- Yohanan Aharoni (1919–1976), Israeli archaeologist and historical geographer
- Yohanan Alemanno (c. 1435–after 1504), Italian Jewish humanist philosopher and exegete
- Yohanan Bader (1901–1994), Revisionist Zionist leader and Israeli politician
- Yohanan Cohen (1917–2013), Israeli former politician and diplomat
- Yohanan Danino (born 1959), chief of the Israel Police
- Yohanan Friedmann (born 1936), Israeli scholar of Islamic studies
- Yohanan Levi (1901–1945), Hebrew linguist and historian
- Yohanan Moyal (born 1965), Israeli Olympic gymnast
- Yochanan Muffs (1932–2009), American–Jewish professor of the Bible and religion
- Yohanan Petrovsky-Shtern (born 1962), American historian, philologist and essayist
- Yohanan Plesner (born 1972), Israeli politician
- Yohanan Simon (1905–1976), Israeli painter
- Yochanan Sofer (1923–2016), Rebbe (leader) of the Erlau Hasidic dynasty
- Yochanan Vollach (born 1945), Israeli former footballer and businessman

== See also ==
- Jose ben Jochanan, Nasi (president) of the Sanhedrin in the 2nd century BCE
- Yohannan
