= Sons of Zadok =

Family of Jewish priests

The Sons of Zadok (Hebrew: בְּנֵי צָדוֹק, romanized: bǝnē Ṣādōq) or Zadokites is a lineage of priests (kohanim) descended from Zadok that is described in the prophecies of Ezekiel.

Zadok himself was the first high priest in Solomon's Temple (10th century BCE). His descendants were high priests in that temple until its destruction in 587 BCE. Ezekiel's prophecy came several decades after that destruction and describes the Zadokite family's loyalty to God while the rest of the nation rebelled against God.

The sons of Zadok are mentioned four times in the Hebrew Bible as part of the Third Temple prophecy in the final chapters of the Book of Ezekiel (chapters 40:46, 43:19, 44:15, and 48:11). They are a theme in Jewish and Christian interpretation of these chapters.

== Hebrew Bible ==
Ezekiel 44:5-15 describes the "rebellion" of the Israelite people and of the Levites. The sins involved in this rebellion include idol worship in verses 10 and 12 and the offering of sacrifices by uncircumcised foreigners in verse 7. As punishment, the "Levites" (including non-Zadokite priests, who are not called priests because they have lost their priestly role according to verse 11, will be demoted from the sacrificial service and will only perform everyday tasks in verses 11-14.

In contrast, the "Levite priests, sons of Zadok," remained loyal to God when the remainder of the people strayed. Therefore, they will be entitled to perform the future sacrificial service in verses 15-16. The passage then continues with a series of laws the sons of Zadok must keep in verses 17-31.

== Rabbinical commentary ==
=== Choice of Zadok ===
Aaron received a perpetual priestly covenant by which his descendants, and only his descendants, would be priests, according to Exodus 29:9, Numbers 18:19, and 1 Chronicles 23:13.

According to some commentaries, the priesthood was further restricted to descendants of Aaron's son Eleazar after Eleazar inherited Aaron's priestly robes (Numbers 20:24–28), and further restricted to descendants of Eleazar's son Pinchas after Pinchas performed his act of zealotry.

Nevertheless, later on the high priesthood was held by Eli, a descendant of Itamar (Eleazar's brother). Torah commentators attribute this to Pinchas' later sins (not instructing the masses in the leadup to the Battle of Gibeah, and not relieving Jephthah of his vow). But upon the sin of Eli's sons, Hophni and Phinehas, a "man of God" prophesied the extinction of their priesthood:

And I will erect myself a reliable priest (who acts) with my heart, and with my soul he will do, and I will build him a reliable household, and he will go before my Anointed all of days.

This prophecy was fulfilled when Zadok, who was descended from Eleazar and Pinchas, was appointed as high priest.

Rashi comments that since Zadok was the first high priest to serve in Solomon's Temple (as opposed to the mobile tabernacle), and also busied himself with establishing the twenty-four priestly divisions, he merited that the preferred lineage of Eleazar be called by his name, "the sons of Zadok" (as opposed to being titled the sons of Eleazar), and the entire concept of the twenty-four divisions be attributed to him.

=== Choice of Zadok's descendants ===
Ezekiel records the general rebellion of the children of Israel against God. Rabbinic commentators understood this general rebellion as referring to that of Jeroboam and the Ten Tribes against the Kingdom of David and the priesthood of Zadok. According to Malbim, the period of idol worship initiated from the rebellion of Jeroboam up until the destruction of the First Temple.

As recognition for not participating in idol worship and for actively and publicly sanctifying God's name, the sons of Zadok were granted numerous benefits in the Third Temple. Several commentators liken this to the case of a king, who after suppressing a rebellion, rewards those individuals who stood firm and did not join the rebellion.

Asher ben Jehiel likens the public actions of the sons of Zadok to those of the Tribe of Levi at the time of the sin of the Golden Calf. In describing the uniqueness of the sons of Zadok, Rabbinic commentators liken their ability to reject Idol worship to that of a person with immunity against a plague, thus allowing them to function normally while others succumb to its undesirable results.

Koheleth Rabbah relates how Zadok and offspring were righteous in their personal actions and Temple service, to the point that were Aaron and his sons present at the era of Zadok and sons, Zadok and sons would supersede them in quality.

=== Priestly role ===
The book of Ezekiel details that the family line of priests, sons of Zadok, will execute the primary services in the Third Temple, that is the services of the altar of the burnt-offering. Similarly, the High Priest must be a descendant of Zadok.

Malbim comments that non-Zadokite priests, who submitted to idol worship, are not eligible to Temple service, but they will be allowed to consume terumah and kodesh (sacrificial meat).

Ezekiel describes the sons of Zadok as conducting the main sacrificial services in the Third Temple, particularly animal sacrifices ("bring to me fat and blood") and organizing the showbread ("come close to my table"). Jonathan Eybeschutz ascribes a symbolic meaning to this terminology. "Fat and blood" symbolizes the union of spirituality and physicality, as opposed to the word mincha (offering) which usually connotes a vegetable offering. Additionally, the showbread table is placed to the North side of the Temple, symbolizes monetary control (according to kaballah, north is synonymous with monetary issue), suggesting that the sons of Zadok will not fall temptation to bribery or similar corruption.

=== As semi-high priests ===
Rabbinic commentators on Ezekiel 44, such as Jonathan Eybeschutz, Isaac Abrabanel, Malbim, argue that after the coming of the Messiah, all sons of Zadok will have the status of "semi" high priests. This is alongside the choice of one of the sons of Zadok to be the full high priest. One source describes the future high priest from the sons of Zadok as being equal in certain ways to the future Jewish Messiah King.

One commonality between the High Priest and the Sons of Zadok appears in the listing of family members for whom they may or may not become defiled. In both cases, the father is listed before the mother, in contrast to the standard priest, where the mother is listed before the father. Another commonality is the animal used for the inauguration by the sons of Zadok of the altar of burnt offering; this animal should be a bull, the same animal typically reserved as a sacrifice of the high priest.

=== Garments of linen ===
The sons of Zadok are instructed to don priestly clothing exclusively made of linen when performing the Temple service and to refrain entirely from using wool, commonly used in the standard priestly sash.

Commentators write that wearing exclusively linen clothing is considered haughty and showy. The sons of Zadok are permitted to wear woolen clothes when mingling with the nation. An additional explanation to refraining from wool during service in the inner court is the nature of sheep to graze in any field they find – even one that the owner does not specifically permit (i.e. theft), whereas linen – as a crop – grows where the sustenance-source of the crop is taken by and with the will of the field owner.

Some kabbalists state that the spiritual source of the Sons of Zadok is that of the sitra of Cain (In the Kabbalah Cain's soul belongs to the Sitra Ahara, the demonic side), where Cain's spiritual source will be elevated to goodness in the messianic era, and therefore are instructed to don linen for the temple service, as it was the fruit of the linen crop that Cain chose to sacrifice to God.

=== Marriage prohibitions ===
Ezekiel 44 prohibits "priests, Levites, sons of Zadok" from certain marriages:

They must not marry widows or divorced women; they may marry only virgins of Israelite descent or widows of priests.

The priestly prohibition on marrying divorcees is already known from Leviticus 21:7. However, the inclusion of forbidding a widow, which was usually permitted to a common priest, is a subject of Rabbinic debate. The Talmud Bavli reads that the earlier part of Ezekiel 44 relates to the sons of Zadok, whereas 44:22 relates to priests who are not of Zadokite descent, meaning that the Zadokites, like the high priest, were forbidden from marrying a widow. This explanation is echoed by the Malbim, Jonathan Eibshitz, and other commentators who see the future status of the sons of Zadok in a Third Temple as quasi-high priests.

Jonathan Eybeschutz explains that the widow of a priest is instructed by Ezekiel to marry another priest so as not be demoted from eating terumah, but she is nonetheless forbidden from marrying the sons of Zadok. Similarly, others explain that since the sons of Zadok are ordered by Ezekiel to be active in the Torah instruction of the Kohanim, the need to have a positive public image is crucial and marrying a widow may cause gossip and rumor that the Zadokite priest had transgressed forbidden relationships in Judaism. Similarly, there is the concern that the widow of a non-priest was initially a divorcee, and over time this fact was forgotten, whereas the widow of a priest is likely not a divorcee since all priests are forbidden from marrying divorcees. Jonathan Eybeschutz argues is the marital life with a widow is not one of full tranquility. As well, the wording of Ezekiel directs the Zadokite priest to marry a virgin, as he is to maintain a disposition of peace. Malbim favors the initial marriage of the sons of Zadok with the daughter of a priest.

Others understand the ending part of the verse to concern the Sons of Zadok as well (i.e. a Son of Zadok is permitted to marry the widow of another priest). The Chasam Sofer reasons that only the widow of the priest is permitted to the Sons of Zadok, since the purity (marital integrity) level of the former wife of a priest is of greater quality than that of the standard daughter of Israel. Along this style of reasoning, others explain that the turmoil of the Jewish diaspora is cause for loss of marital integrity amongst the greater Jewish population whereas the Kohanim are more apt at maintaining an above-average standard of integrity for their spouses -thus the widow of a priest is permitted to the sons of Zadok.

=== Torah instruction ===
The sons of Zadok are directed to provide Torah instruction to the people.

This instruction appears to be redundant to the standard portrayal of the priest as instructor (see The Torah instruction of the Kohanim). Chaim Yosef David Azulai, based on the writings of Samson ben Pesah Ostropoli, explains that the sons of Zadok are required to commit to judging monetary disputes, and are divinely blessed with an inherent ability to conquer the negative attribute of forgetfulness and to judge truthfully.

=== Guarding Shabbat ===
Similarly, the sons of Zadok are told to guard Shabbat. This too appears to be redundant.

According to Malbim, since priests are permitted to do certain activities prohibited on Shabbat due to sacrificial activity that override Shabbat in the Temple, they must be reminded not to do the same outside the Temple. Similarly, due to their requirement to engage in judicial activity, they may transgress Shabbat by writing legal notes. Likewise, there is the need to ascertain the sons of Zadok will not issue a death sentence on the Shabbat.

Kabbalists declare that in the Messianic era the concept of nightfall and darkness will cease. As there will be no visual indication of the beginning of Shabbat, the sons of Zadok will be responsible for indicating this time to the nation of Israel. Zadok HaKohen writes that the observance of Shabbat by the priests, who are otherwise sustained by the twenty-four kohanic gifts rather than working, causes a surplus of kedusha to the entire nation of Israel and protects them from submitting to evil impulses.

=== Apportioned chambers ===
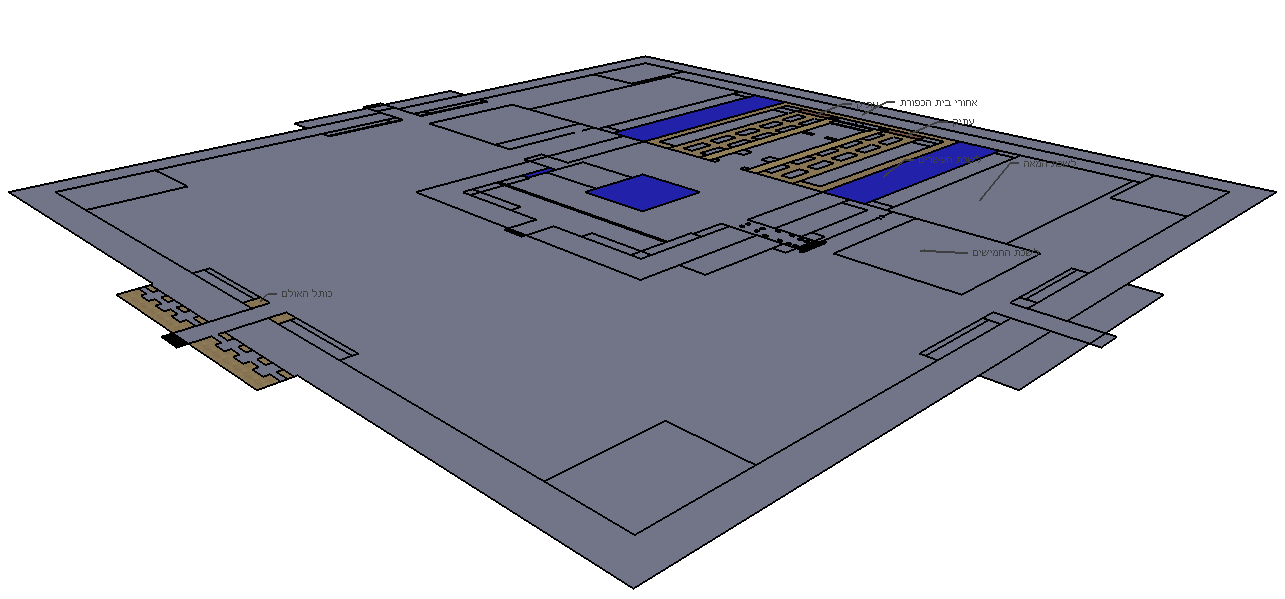
Blue colored sections indicate the chambers allotted to the sons of Zadok in the Third Temple

Due to the sons of Zadok performing the sacrificial services of the Third Temple, a specified chamber is apportioned to them as per the architectural detail laid out by Ezekiel. The verse describes one unique aspect of this chamber (compared to the other chambers) in the aspect that its entry-point faces north (as opposed to the other chambers opening towards south). Torah commentators describe that since the Zadokite priests are given the duties of the altar of burnt offering, therefore their chamber is situated at the South of the ramp leading up to the Mizbeach, with the entry and exit to their chamber facing North, thereby allowing them direct access to this ramp. The text in Ezekiel does not record the size of this chamber, nor describe if it is split into multiple rooms or is one large room.

=== Estates in Jerusalem ===
As part of Ezekiel's vision of the division of the Land of Israel to the Twelve tribes of Israel and to the Messiah, the apportioning of a swath of land to the Sons of Zadok around the Temple Mount is mentioned. The measurement of this area is specified as 4,750 kanns (the kann measurement of Ezekiel is described as six amahs, with each amah consisting of six tefachs) beginning from the southern end of the Temple Mount heading South and from the opposite edge of the Temple Mount leading North, 12,250 kanns leading West and likewise to the East. This portion of the sons of Zadok is included in the 25,000 by 25,000 kanns that are to be given the greater Tribe of Levi with the greater tribe of Levi including Kohanim as well.

=== Identifying Kohens of Zadokite lineage ===
Hai ben Sherira, in a letter sent to the kohanism of Synagogue of the Kohanim of Djirt on Djerba, describes multiple personality aspects to be used in identifying genuine Kohanim. He describes the character traits of the Zadokite Kohenim:

Any Kohen complete in his ways, exceptional is his path, and straight in his actions, who rises and lingers in the Beit Knessets and Beit medrashs and guards himself from every evil thing and every impure thing – this is from the sons of Zadok the Kohen ... and is fit that Ruach HaKodesh should rest on him.

=== Known priests of Zadokite lineage ===
Priests in the Hebrew Bible of Zadokite lineage include Ezra and his relative, Joshua the High Priest.

Rabbis of Zadokite lineage include Eleazar ben Azariah (noted as being of tenth generation lineage to Ezra) and his descendants, Ezra and Rabbi Avtulas.

Raphael Cohen of Hamburg was likewise known to be a descendant of the biblical Ezra; his patrilineal descendants include David Cohen the Nazirite, She'ar Yashuv Cohen, and Yoel Kahn.

Rabbinic literature indicates that there were numerous priestly families of Zadokite lineage, amongst them David HaKohain Bar Isha, who upon the expulsion of Jews from Spain in 1492, emigrated to the town of Debdou in Morocco, a town purported to have consisted of a large population of Jewish priests. and Yosef ben Saddiq de Arévalo, sephardic poet and philosopher, who wrote "Memories ok Zadok" (1487) where he exposes his lineage from Zadok to himself. Some of the Arévalo family converted to Christianity.

== Second Temple sects ==
=== Qumran ===
Various documents of the texts found at Qumran mention the teachers of the community as "kohanim Sons of Zadok", leading some scholars to assume that the community at Qumran included priests who refused to participate in the Hellenization of the priesthood then taking place in Jerusalem.

=== Sadducees ===
Abraham Geiger (1857), the founder of Reform Judaism, was of the opinion that the Sadducee (Tzadoki in Mishnaic pronunciation) sect of Judaism drew their name from Zadok the high priest in The First Temple, and that the leaders of the Sadducees were in fact the "Sons of Zadok".

However, there are other theories about Sadduccees' origin:

- Historian Paul L. Maier derives Sadduccees' name from a certain Pharisee named Sadduc mentioned in Antiquities of the Jews by Josephus.
- Avot of Rabbi Natan (5:2) states that the Sadducees began at the same time as the Boethusians, and their founder was a later Zadok who, like Boethus, was a student of Antigonus of Sokho during the second century BCE.

== In Christianity ==
The idea of a literal fulfillment of Ezekiel's Third Temple in Jerusalem is an idea shared between some schools of Judaism and some millennial or adventist Protestants. These beliefs may include the reinstatement of animal sacrifices, and the reestablishment of a Zadokite priesthood:

The sons of Zadok are privileged to come near to the Lord to minister to Him. In the kingdom age, the descendants of Zadok become the personal ministers to Jesus the Messiah and His prince ...

This verse also compares Revelation 1:4–5, 5:9–10 stating that all who are saved by His blood, also are made priest unto God the Father. It speaks of a present priesthood existing as well as into the future for all Christians.

== In literature ==
Samuel ibn Naghrillah alluded to the loyalty of the sons of Zadok in his poem:

A benevolent, Crassness she does not speak

And does not heave shame on her parents The chosen sons of Zadok, a covenant of friendship

She will defame, but her father she will not defame

== See also ==
- Essenes
- Related Bible parts: Ezekiel 43, Ezekiel 44
- The Mitzvah of sanctifying the Kohen
