= Jehozadak =

Son of Seraiah

Jehozadak is a man in the Bible, his name means "God had justified". He was the son of the high priest Seraiah (Note: Patrilineal ancestry, as per 1 Chronicles chapter 6.) at the time of the Babylonian exile (597-581 BCE, 1Chronicles 6:14, 15).

He was taken into captivity by Nebuchadnezzar II (reigned c. 605-562 BCE), and probably died in Babylon. He was the father of Jeshua/Joshua, who returned with Zerubbabel.
