= Azariah II =

Azariah (Hebrew: עֲזַרְיָה ‘Ǎzaryā, "Yah has helped") was a high priest mentioned in the Hebrew Bible (2 Chronicles 26) at the time of King Uzziah's leprosy (c. 751 – 740 BCE).
