= Uzzi =

Uzzi is a given name. One derivation is biblical, from Uzzî (Hebrew: עֻזִּי) meaning "my strength". The name can also be transliterated as Uzi. It may be a nickname for Uzza/Uzzah, Uzzia/Uzziah, and Uziel/Uzziel.

Biblical characters with this name:

- Uzzi, high priest of Israel (Greek: Οζι in 1 Chr., Σαουια in Ezra; Latin: Ozi), the son of Bukki, a descendant of Aaron (1 Chr. 6:5, 51; Ezra 7:4)

Israelite religious titles
Preceded by Bukki	High Priest of Israel	Succeeded by Eli

- Uzzi ben Sashai was the 3rd Samaritan High Priest according to Samaritan Genealogical Records. He may be identical to the Jewish High Priest, as his predecessor Bukki also may have been, although the patronyms imply different fathers which might be a product of an adoption or levirate marriage or being two different individuals

Preceded by Bukki	Samaritan High Priest	Succeeded by Sashai II

According to Samaritan tradition, Uzzi hid the tent sanctuary of the desert wandering (Mishkan) in a cave on Mount Gerizim when the Israelites introduced the cult in Shiloh, which was illegitimate from the Samaritan point of view.

Patrilineal descent
1. Abraham
2. Isaac
3. Jacob
4. Levi
5. Kehath
6. Amram
7. Aaron
8. Eleazar
9. Phinehas
10. Abishua
11. Sashai according to Samaritans, skipped by Jews
12. Bukki

- Uzzi, (Greek: Οζι; Latin: Ozi), a grandson of Issachar (1 Chr. 7:2, 3)
- Uzzi, (Greek: Οζι; Latin: Ozi), a son of Bela, and grandson of Benjamin (1 Chr. 7:7)
- Uzzi, (Greek: Οζι; Latin: Ozi), a Benjamite, a chief in the tribe (1 Chr. 9:8)
- Uzzi, (Greek: Οζι; Latin: Azzi), a son of Bani, had the oversight of the Levites after the return from captivity (Neh. 11:22)
- Uzzi, (Greek: Οζι; Latin: Azzi), the head of the house of Jedaiah, one of "the chief of the priests" (Neh. 12:19)
- Uzzi, (Greek: Οζι; Latin: Azzi) a priest who assisted in the dedication of the walls of Jerusalem (Neh. 12:42)

Other people with this given name include:

- Alin Adrian "Uzzi" Demeter, Romanian Hip-Hop artist and member of B.U.G. Mafia
- Uzzi Ornan (1923–2022), Israeli linguist and social activist
- Uzzi Reiss (born 1945), American physician

== See also ==
- Uzi (disambiguation)
