= Erraez =

Erraez and Herraez are variations of the same Sephardi surname. (Judaeo-Spanish: Sefardies) This pedigree belong to a sub-group known as Spanish and Portuguese Jews, whose families remained in Spain and Portugal as ostensible Christians (after the Alhambra decree of 1492) and later reverted to Judaism in France and Italy, some of whom emigrated to the New World in the 18th century as conversos, particularly to Mexico, the Caribbean and South America.

Some people with these names include:

- Juan Garrido Herráez (born 1951), Spanish politician
- Miguel Herráez (born 1957), Spanish writer

Other Sephardic families:

- Abravanel
- Abulafia
- Alazrague
- Barzel
- Casal
- Cohen
- Cardozo
- Carneiro
- Donatez
- Damuz
- De Castro
- Eleazar
- Espina
- Ezra
- Falcon
- Fierres
- Fonseca
- Gamarra
- Gazy
- Gershom
- Harari
- Huete
- Ibrahim
- Izradiel
- Jalaf
- Jerez
- Joel
- Kohen
- Lanery
- Levi
- Manrique
- Marsel
- Montiel
- Mose
- Nucaty
- Nunez
- Obadias
- Ormaza
- Palat
- Rangel
- Saavedra
- Seixas
- Talavera
- Tesat
- Torrijos
- Uziel
- Valenty
- Xaquez
- Yzcadarani
- Zacarias

== See also ==
- History of the Jews in Latin America
- History of the Jews in Spain
- Crypto-Jews
- Jewish name
- Jewish ethnic divisions
