= Gamarra =

Gamarra may refer to:

- Gamarra (surname)
- Gamarra, Cesar, a town and municipality in Cesar, Colombia
- Jirón Gamarra, one of the main streets of La Victoria District, Lima, Peru
  - Gamarra Commercial Emporium, the largest shopping centre in Peru, located on this street
- Gamarra (Málaga), a ward of Bailén-Miraflores, city of Málaga, Spain

== See also ==
- Gamarra Mayor, village in Spain
- Gamarra Menor, hamlet in Spain
- Estadio Juan Maldonado Gamarra, a multi-use stadium in Cutervo Province, Peru
- Mariscal Gamarra District, Peru
- Gamarra metro station, in Lima, Peru
