= Uzi (disambiguation) =

Uzi most commonly refers to an Israeli submachine gun family.

Uzi may also refer to:

== Music ==
Performers

- Uzi (band), a 1980s band fronted by Thalia Zedek
- Uzi (Japanese rapper), Japanese hip-hop artist
- Uzi (French rapper) (born 1999), French singer
- Uzi (Turkish rapper) (born 1998), Turkish rapper
- Da Uzi (born 1994), French hip hop artist of Congolese origin
- Lil Uzi Vert (born 1995), rapper from Philadelphia, Pennsylvania
- Uzzi, (Romanian rapper) (born 1978), Romanian rapper and member of B.U.G. Mafia

Albums

- Uzi, a 1989 album by Muslimgauze

Songs

- "Uzi" (Pinky Ring), a 2001 song by Wu-Tang Clan

== People ==
- Uzi (gamer) (born 1997), in-game name of Jian Zi-Hao Chinese League of Legends player
- Uzi Arad, Israeli strategist
- Uzi Even (born 1940), Israeli professor of chemistry and former politician
- Uzi Gal (1923–2002), designer and namesake of the Uzi submachine gun
- Uzi Hitman (1952–2004), musician
- Uzi Landau (born 1943), Israeli politician
- Uzi Narkiss (1925–1997), Israeli general
- Uzi Rubin (born 1957), Israeli defense engineer and analyst
- Uzi Vishkin (born 1953), Israeli American professor of computer science and engineering
- Uzi Doorman, the main character of the animated web series Murder Drones (2021-2024)

== Places ==
- Uzi, an alternate romanization for Uji, Kyoto, a town in Japan
- Uzi Island, an island in Zanzibar, Tanzania
  - Uzi, Zanzibar, a settlement on Uzi Island, Zanzibar
- Uzi, Iran (disambiguation), places in Iran

== See also ==
- Uziel (disambiguation)
- Uzi fly, a parasitoid of silkworm
- Apache Oozie, a workflow scheduling system to manage Hadoop jobs
