= Carneiro (disambiguation) =

Carneiro is a surname.

Carneiro may also refer to:

- Carneiro, a parish in the municipality of Amarante in Portugal
- Carneiro Township, Ellsworth County, Kansas, a township in Ellsworth County, Kansas
- General Carneiro, a city in the Brazilian state of Paraná
- General Carneiro, Mato Grosso, a city in the Brazilian state of Mato Grosso
- Piquet Carneiro, a city in the Brazilian state of Ceará
- Francisco Sá Carneiro Airport, Portuguese airport
- Joinville-Lauro Carneiro de Loyola Airport, Brazilian airport
