= Domingos Mãhörõ =

Brazilian indigenous chief (1960–2020)

- Born: 1960; Sangradouro Indigenous Land, Mato Grosso, Brazil
- Died: 6 July 2020 (aged 59–60); Cuiabá, Mato Grosso, Brazil
- Occupations: Indigenous leader Chief (cacique)
- Organization: Indigenous Cooperative of Mato Grosso
- Known for: Leadership in Xavante community Indigenous health advocacy
- Title: Cacique of the Xavante people

Domingos Mãhörõ (1960 – 6 July 2020) was a chief (cacique) of the Xavante ethnic group of the Sangradouro indigenous land, in the region of General Carneiro, 449 km from Cuiabá, Mato Grosso. He was president of the indigenous cooperative of the state and was an active leader in the causes of the indigenous people; he was coordinator of Indigenous Health and in charge of the Indigenous Cooperative (Cooperativa Indígena).

Mahoro was a victim of COVID-19 during the pandemic in Brazil. Suffering from diabetes and hypertension, he died in Cuiabá, Mato Grosso, after being transferred from the interior of the state. His COVID-19 diagnosis was confirmed on June 25, and he was admitted to a private health unit in the city of Primavera do Leste. As his clinical condition worsened, he was requested to be transferred to an Intensive Care Unit (ICU) at Hospital Estadual Santa Casa, in Cuiabá. He only arrived on 6 July, despite an injunction with the Public Defender's Office being issued three days earlier. After being transferred to the ICU, Domingos Mãhörõ suffered two cardiac arrests and died on the same day, aged 60.
