= Livro das Plantas de Todas as Fortalezas =

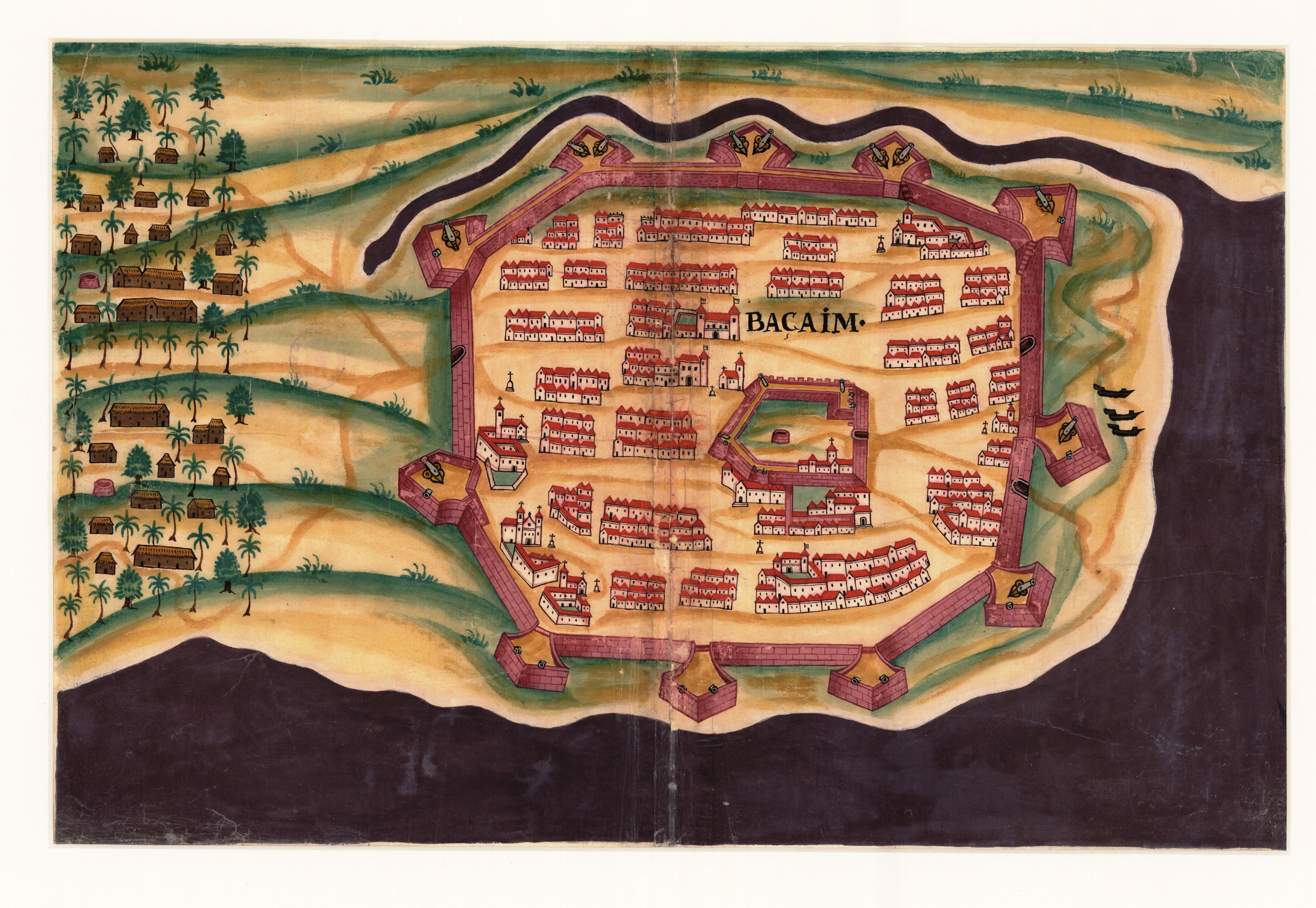
Baçaim

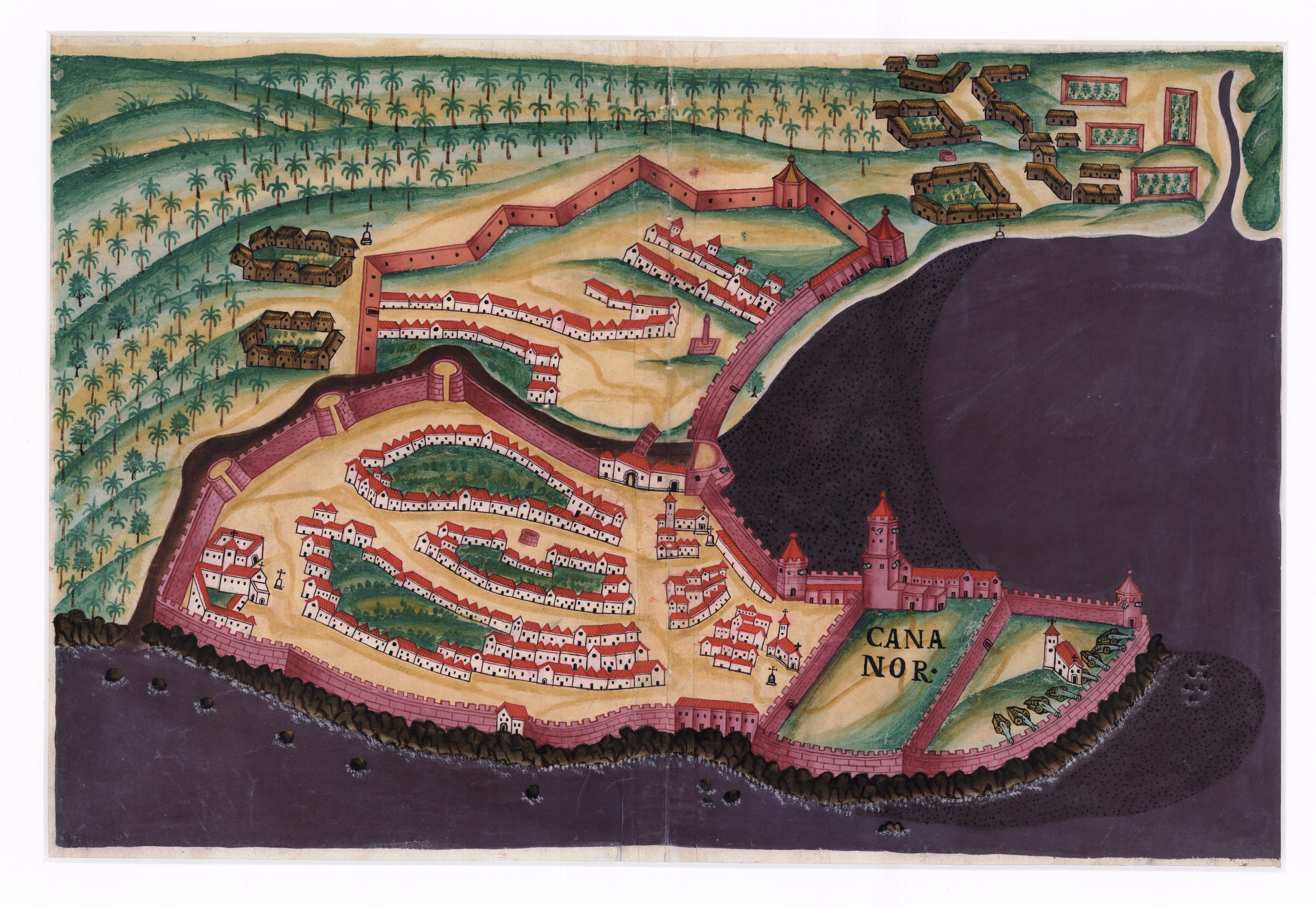
Cananor

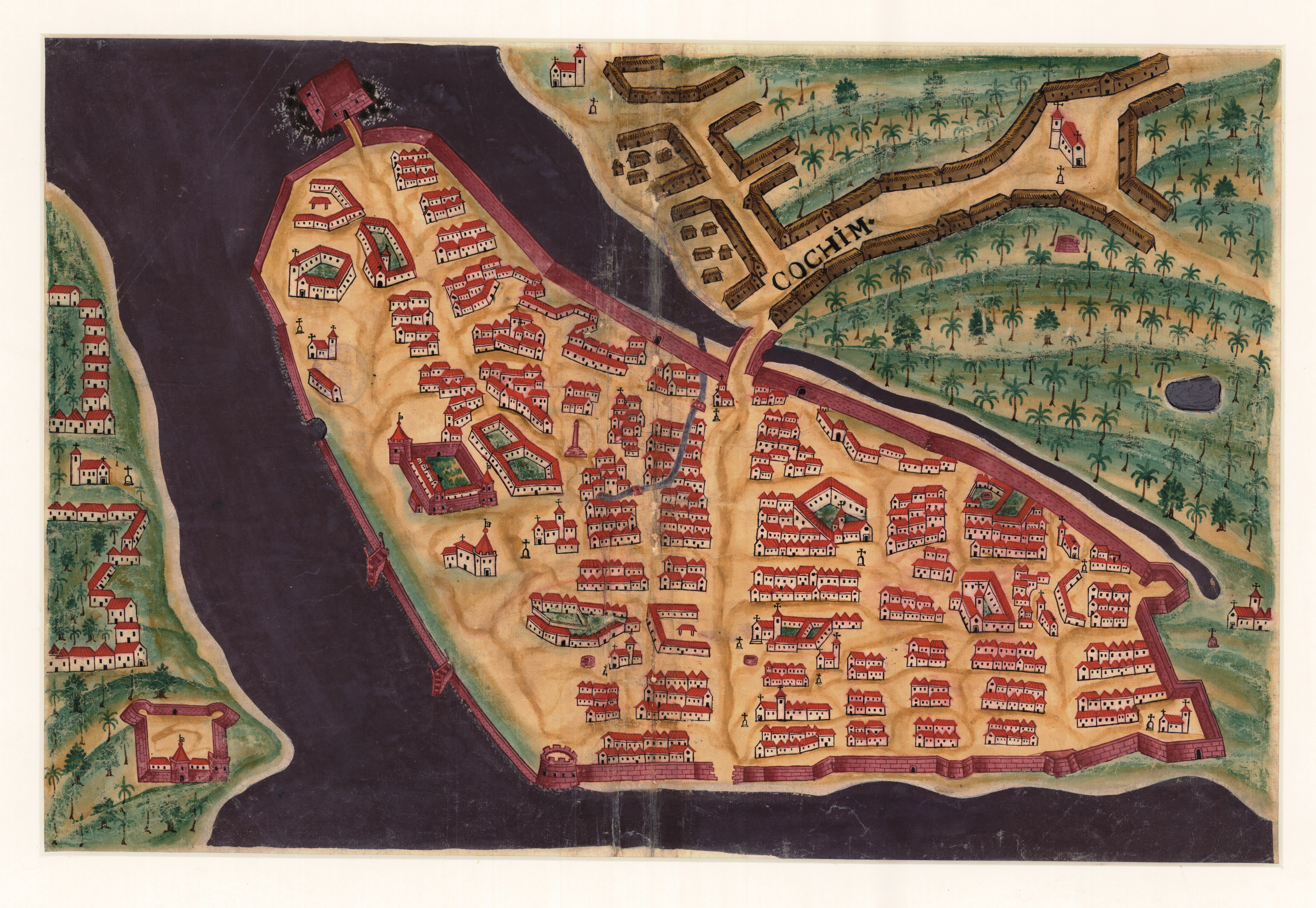
Cochim

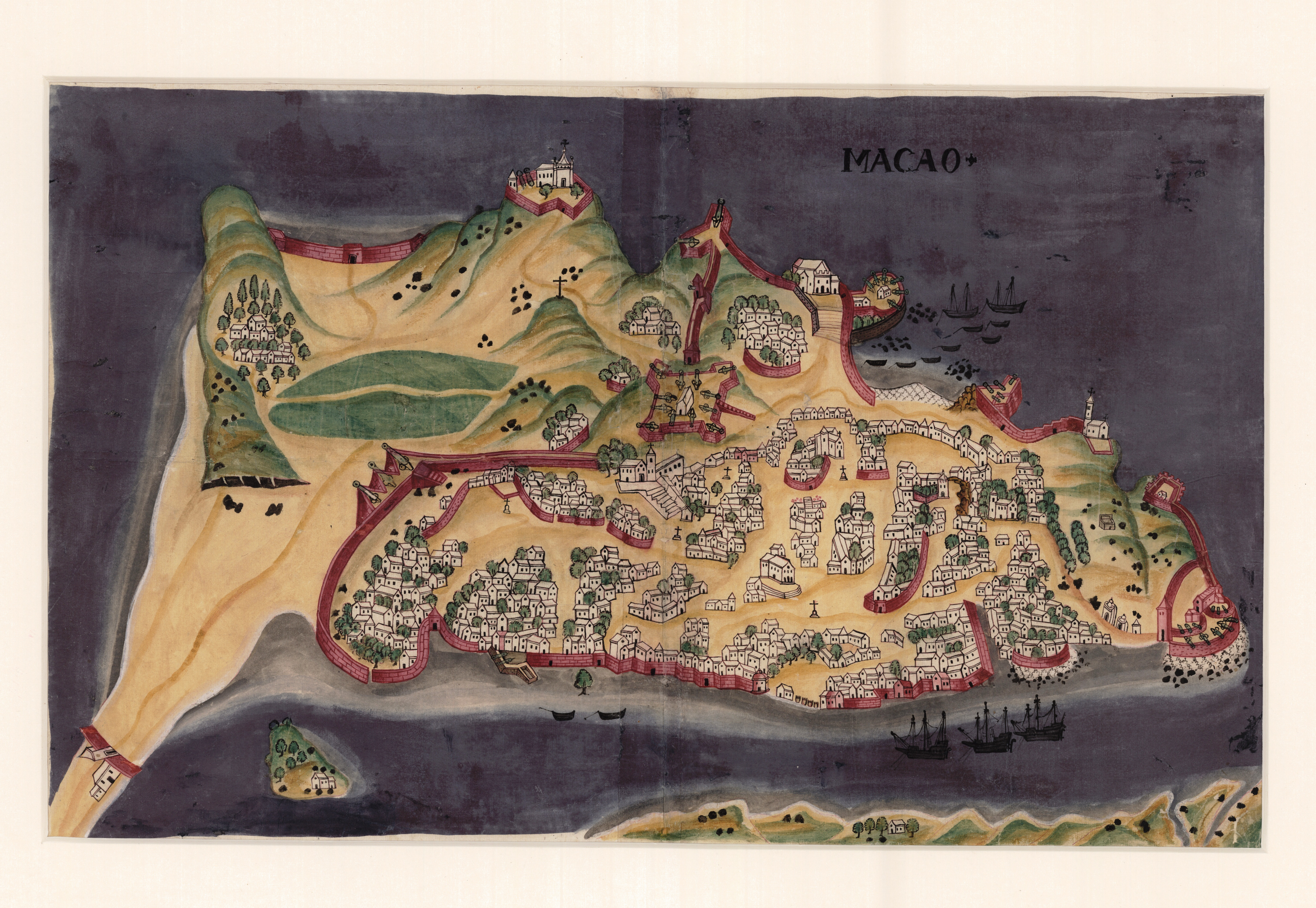
Macau

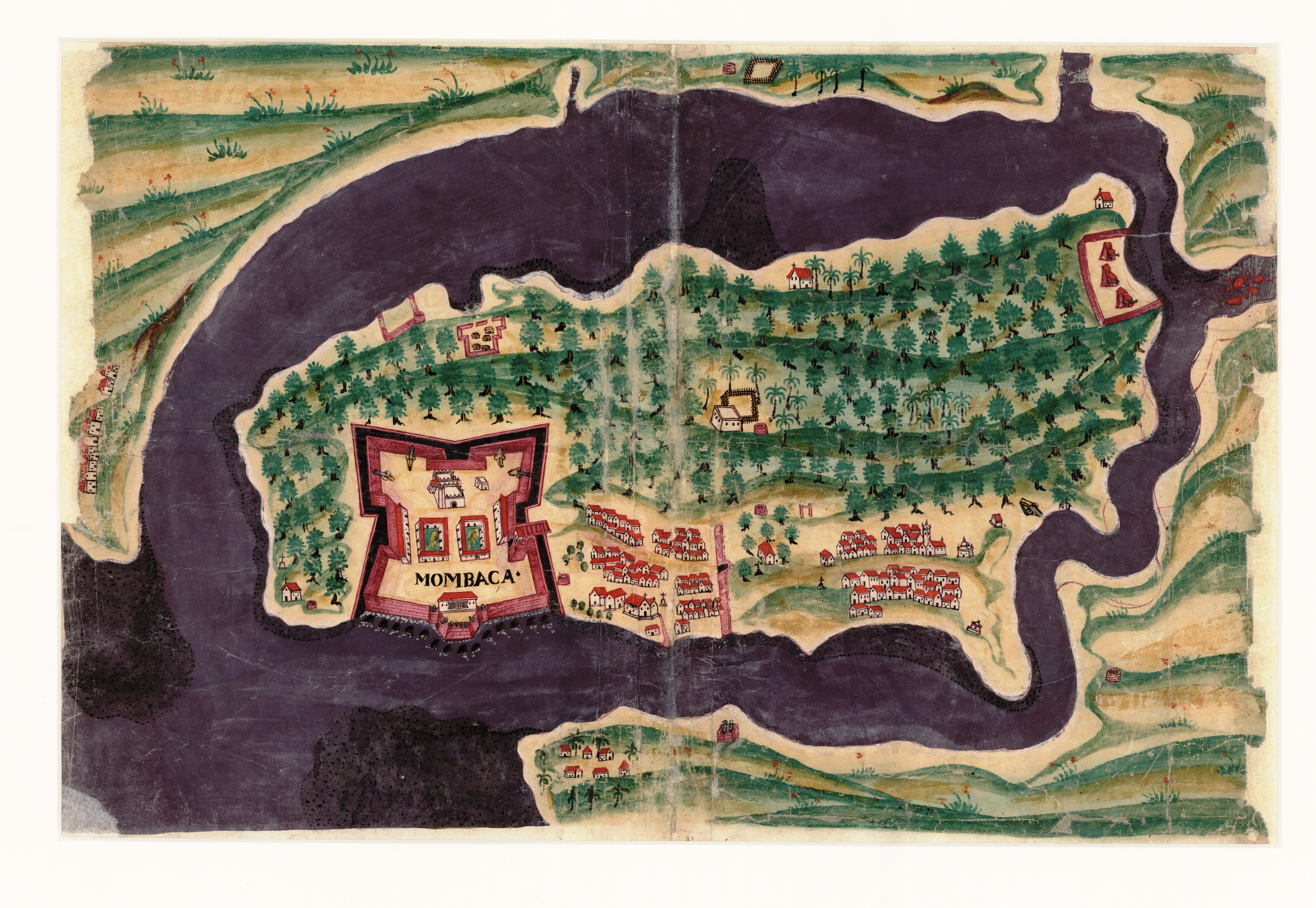
Mombaça

The Livro das Plantas de todas as fortalezas, cidades e povoações do Estado da Índia Oriental (Book of the Plans of all the fortresses, cities and townships of the State of the East India), commonly referred to as only Livro das Plantas de todas as fortalezas (Book of the Plans of all the fortresses), it is a sixteenth-century Portuguese manuscript, source to the study of the cartography and military architecture of the Portuguese State of India.

Made in 1635, it lies nowadays in the Biblioteca Pública de Évora (Évora Public Library), in Évora, Portugal.

== History ==
In 1632, during the Philippine Dynasty, Philip IV of Spain ordered the then Viceroy of the State of India, Fernando de Noronha, 5th Count of Linhares, to survey the fortresses under his jurisdiction in East Africa, the Arabian Peninsula, and the Far East. In 1633, he entrusted the task to the official chronicler of the State of India and Keeper of the Royal Archives of Goa, António Bocarro. The result was the atlas known as "Livro das Plantas de todas as fortalezas, cidades e povoações do Estado da Índia Oriental".

Prepared in two original copies, the work was sent to the Court in Lisbon at the beginning of 1635. The text was accompanied by fifty-two plans of fortresses and cities.

In the dedicatory letter that accompanied the original manuscripts, transcribed by Barbosa Machado (1741) from a copy he researched in the library of the Duke of Cadaval, Bocarro refers to the difficulties he experienced in completing the work, difficulties to which he attributes its imperfections. Among these, he mentioned the demands of his office, which prevented him from traveling and examining "very particularly" each of the fortresses or settlements he described. For this reason, he was forced to resort to the requested information that reached him, which he rigorously vetted, so that the sovereign could give it complete credence. However, he did not guarantee the same perfection with regard to the maps that accompanied the text.

Although Bocarro did not name the author of the drawings, research by Jaime Cortesão and Avelino Teixeira da Mota (1960) concludes that they were executed by Pedro Barreto de Resende, secretary to the Count of Linhares, since Resende himself states this at the beginning of the codex Descrições das Fortalezas da Índia Oriental (Descriptions of the Fortresses of East India) which he authored and is currently in the National Library of France, in Paris.

Other versions of the manuscript include the Livro do Estado da Índia Oriental (Book of the State of East India) (c. 1636) by Pedro Barreto de Resende himself, currently in the National Library of France, in Paris. This, in turn, was used as a basis by António de Maris Carneiro in the preparation of his Descrição da Fortaleza de Sofala (Description of the Fortress of Sofala) (1639), currently in the National Library of Portugal, in Lisbon. A final manuscript, dated 1646, is deposited in the British Library, in London.

== Characteristics ==
The work is presented in the form of an album with 48 engravings. These drawings are important from a historical and iconographic point of view and, although attractive for their polychromy, technically present limited cartographic value, since they lack essential elements such as the cartographic scale and cardinal orientation. The delineation shows little care, with a proliferation of vegetation symbols, large proportions of houses and fortress walls, according to the analysis of the researcher Suzanne Daveau (1997). These details did not escape Bocarro who, in his dedicatory letter, lamented the lack of orientation and scale. He asserted that he had not obtained "the plans arranged, demarcated and measured by scale" and lamented the total absence, in the State of India, of people "knowledgeable in said arts".

The recorded fortifications of Southeast Arabia include the forts of Soar, Corfação, Quelba, Libédia (present-day al-Bid'yya), Mada, and Doba, the most important in the region, judging by the extent of its defenses, but which has not survived to the present day. The list then moves on to Dio (present-day Diu) on the western coast of the Indian subcontinent

== List of Plans ==
- East Africa
1. Sofala
2. Monsambique
3. Mombaça
- Arabia
1. Coriate
2. Mascate
3. Matara
4. Sibo
5. Borca
6. Soar
7. Corfacam
8. Quelba
9. Libedia
10. Mada
11. Doba, Dubo and Mocombi
- India
1. Dio
2. Damaô
3. Samgês and Danu
4. Tarapor and Chichana
5. Maim and Sirgam
6. Agacaim, Manora and Ilha das Vacas
7. Sera de Aserim
8. Baçaim
9. Tana and Bandora
10. Mombaim and Ilha de Carania
11. Moro de Chaul
12. Chaul
13. Divar, Choraô, Bardes and Agoada
14. Salsete
15. Cambolim
16. Barçalor and Barcelor de cima
17. Mangalor, Banguel and Olala
18. Cananor
19. Cranganor
20. Cochim
21. Coulam
- Ceylon (Sri Lanka)
1. Manar
2. Negumbo
3. Caliture
4. Guale
5. Bahia de Tanavare
6. Baia de Beligaô em Seilaô
7. Batecalou
8. Triquilimale
9. Iafanapatam
- India - continuation
1. San Tome
- Far East
1. Malaca
2. Macao
3. Solor

== Gallery ==
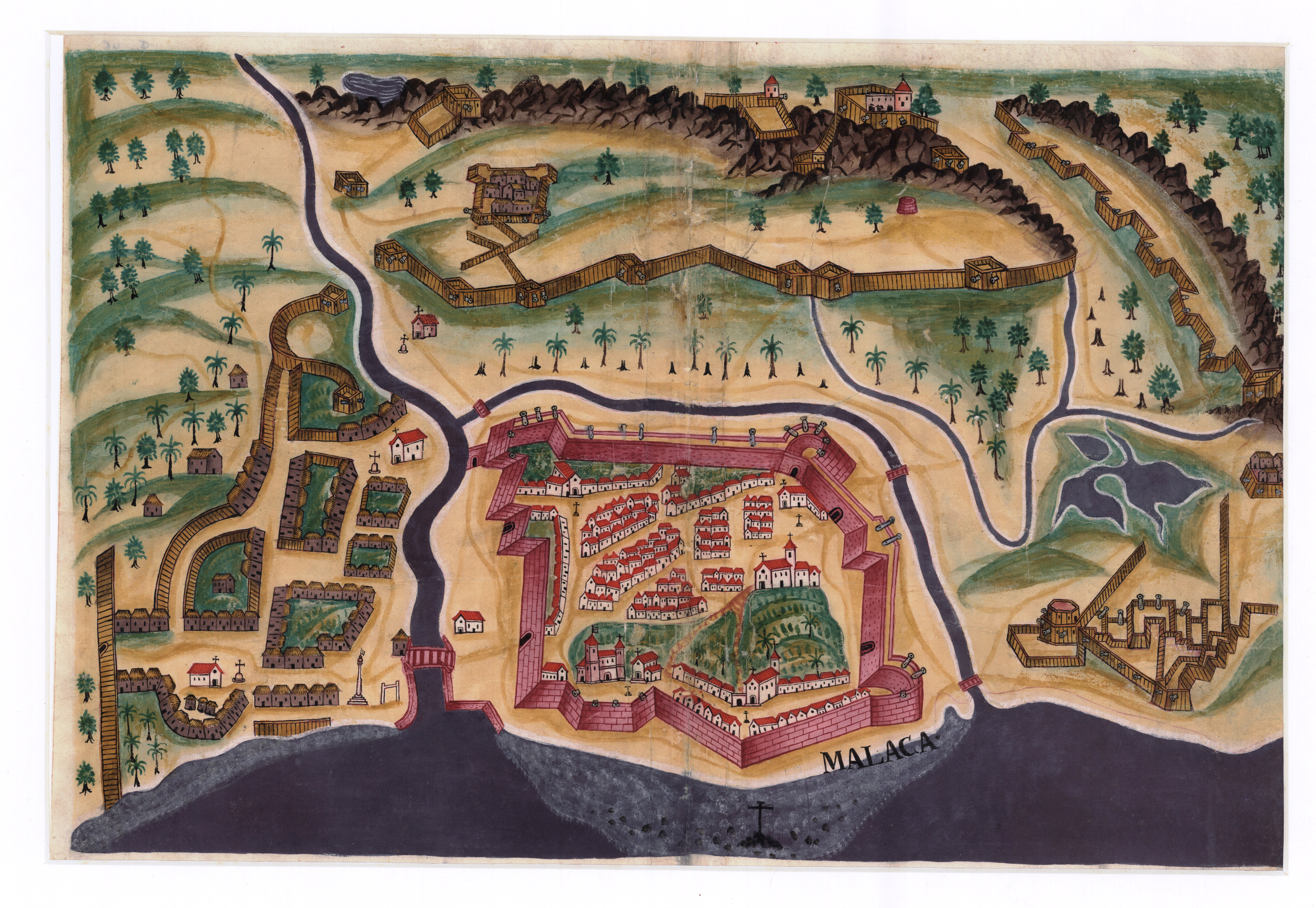
Malaca

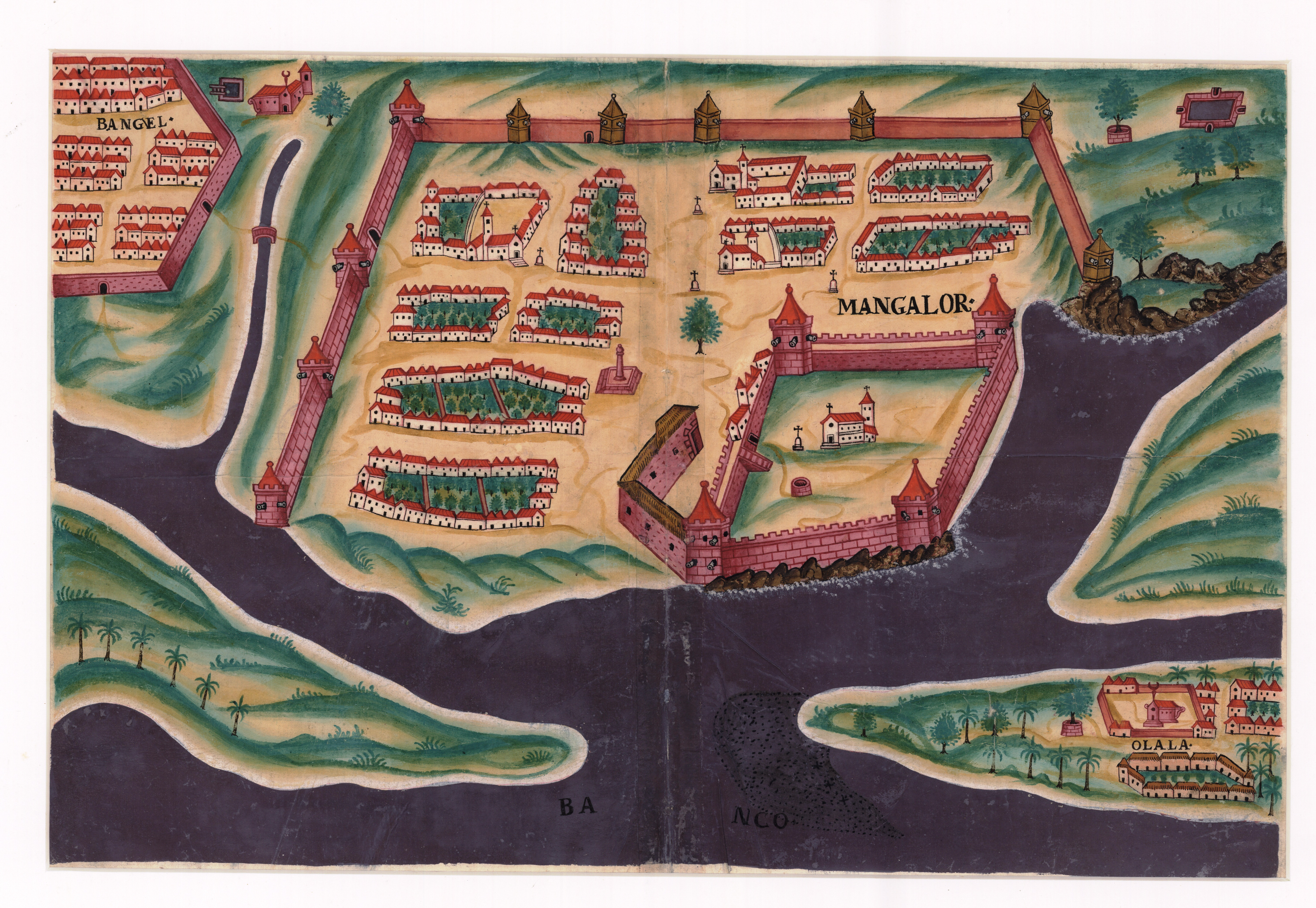
Mangalor

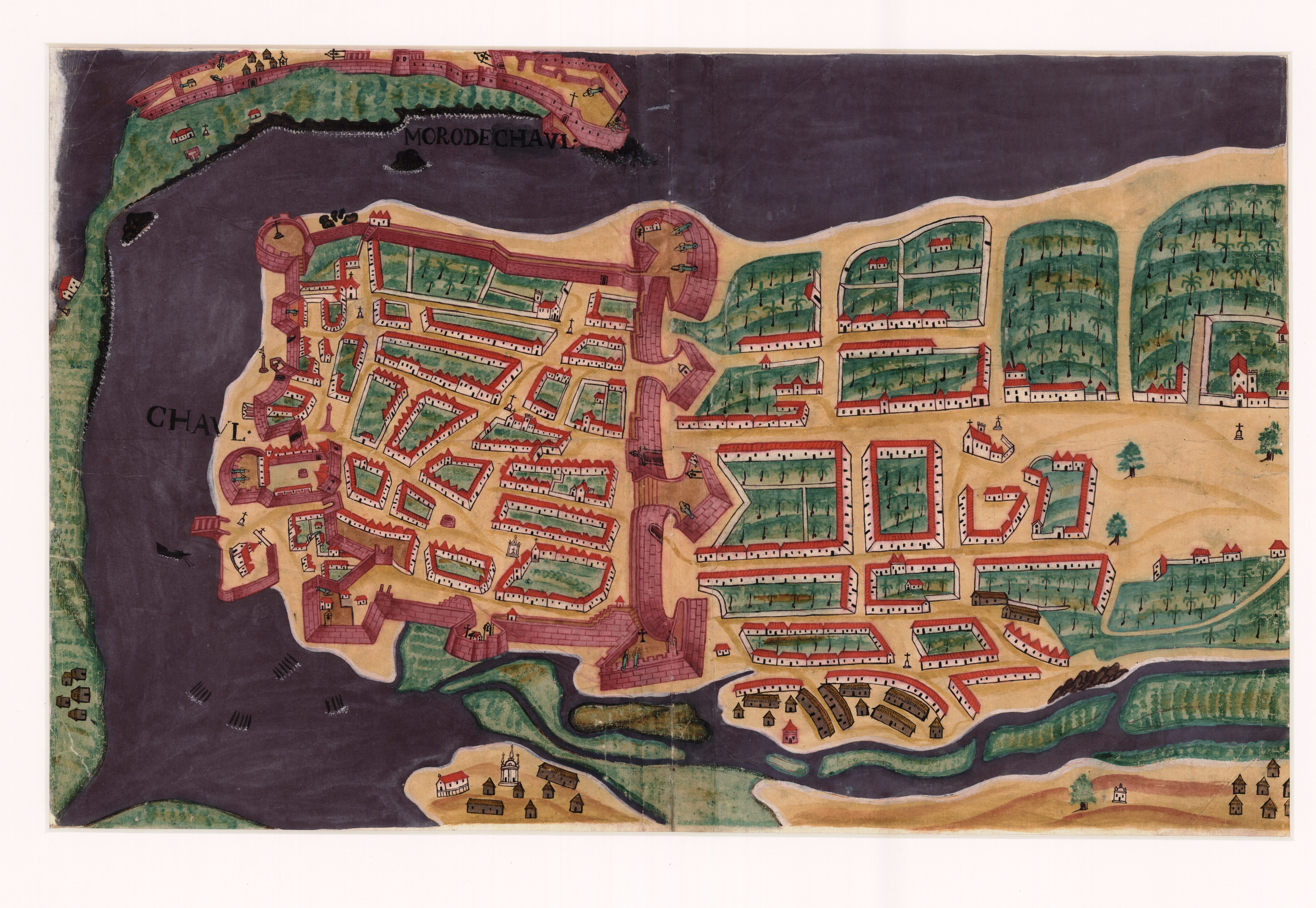
Chaul

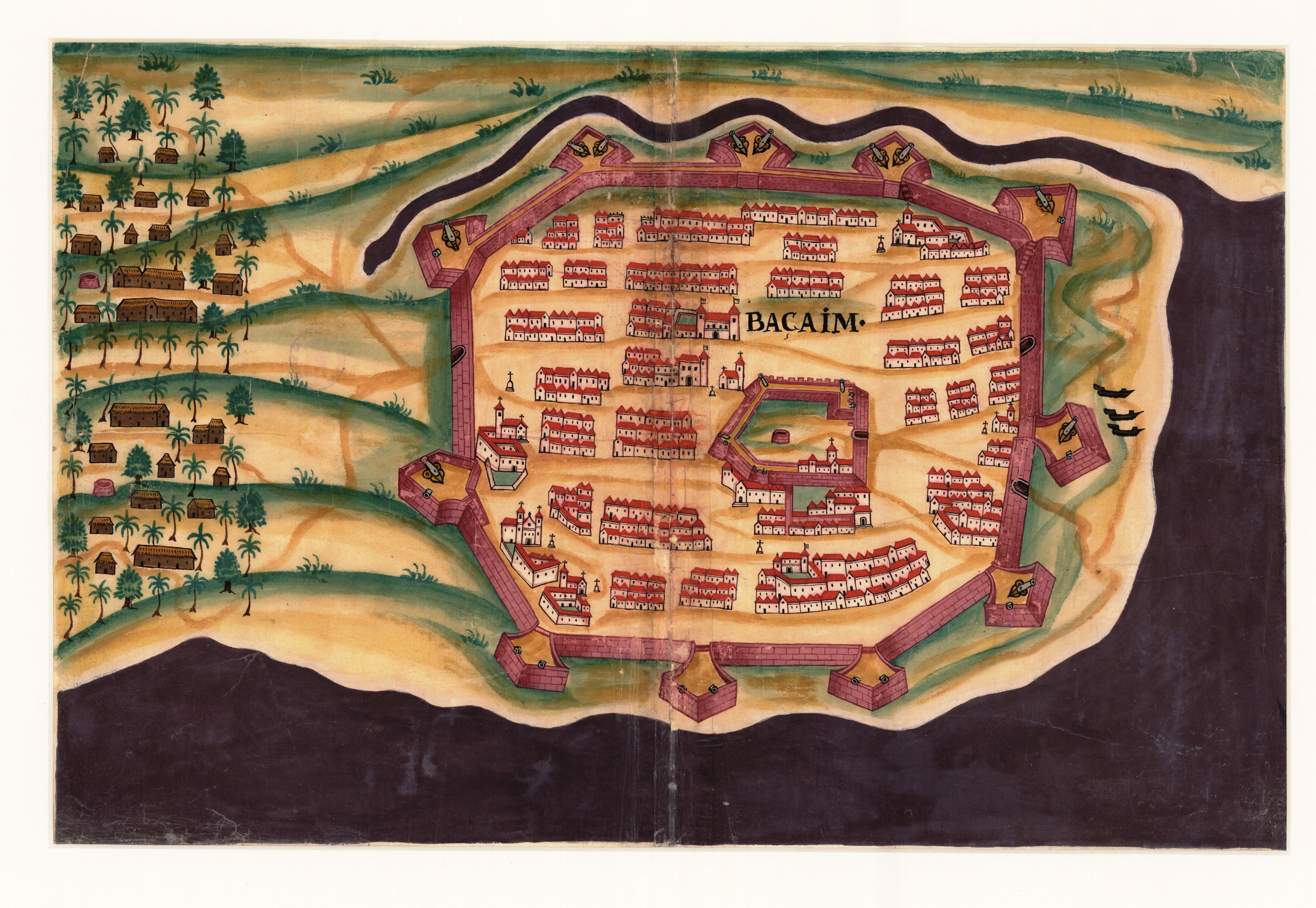
Baçaim

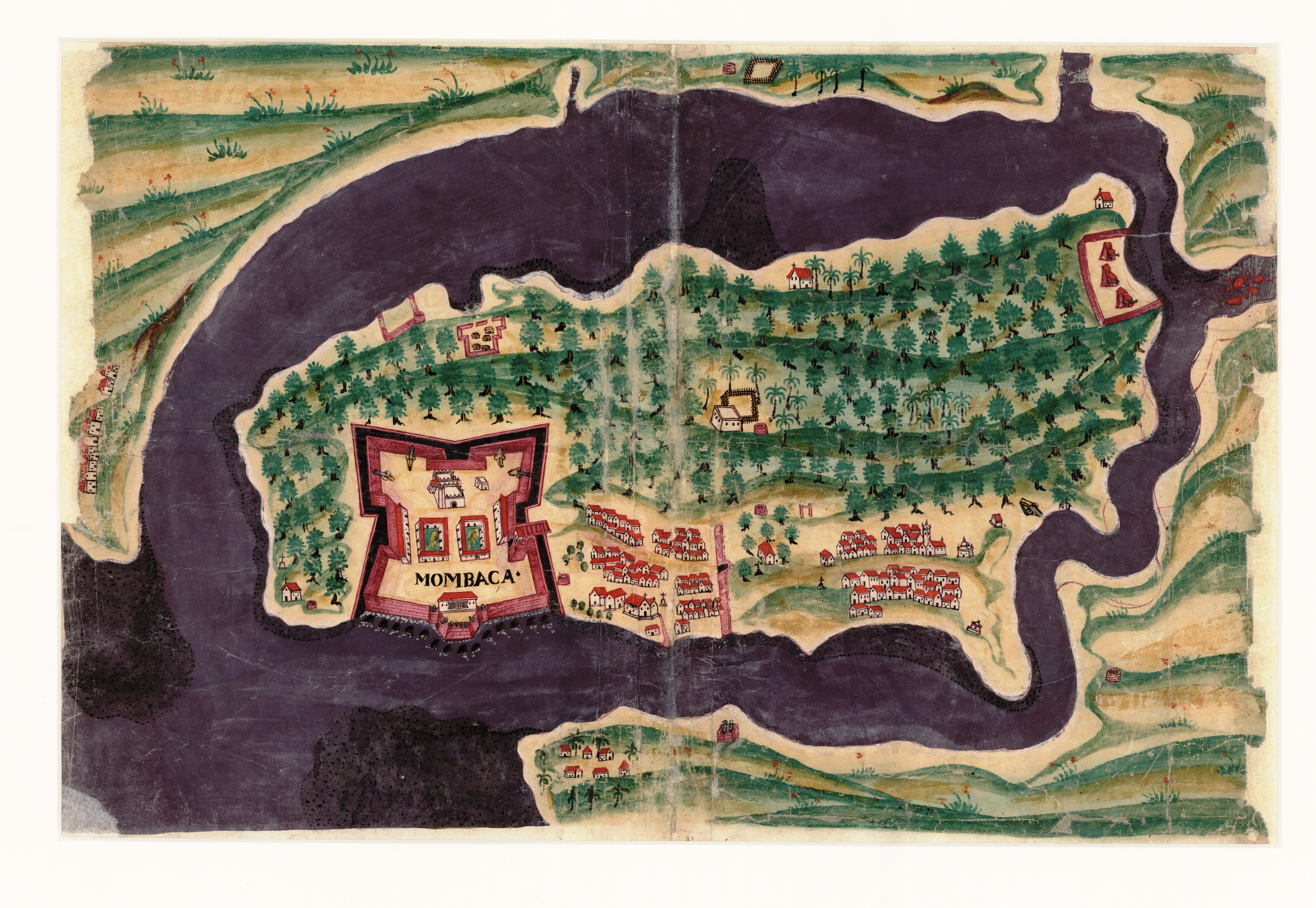
Mombaça

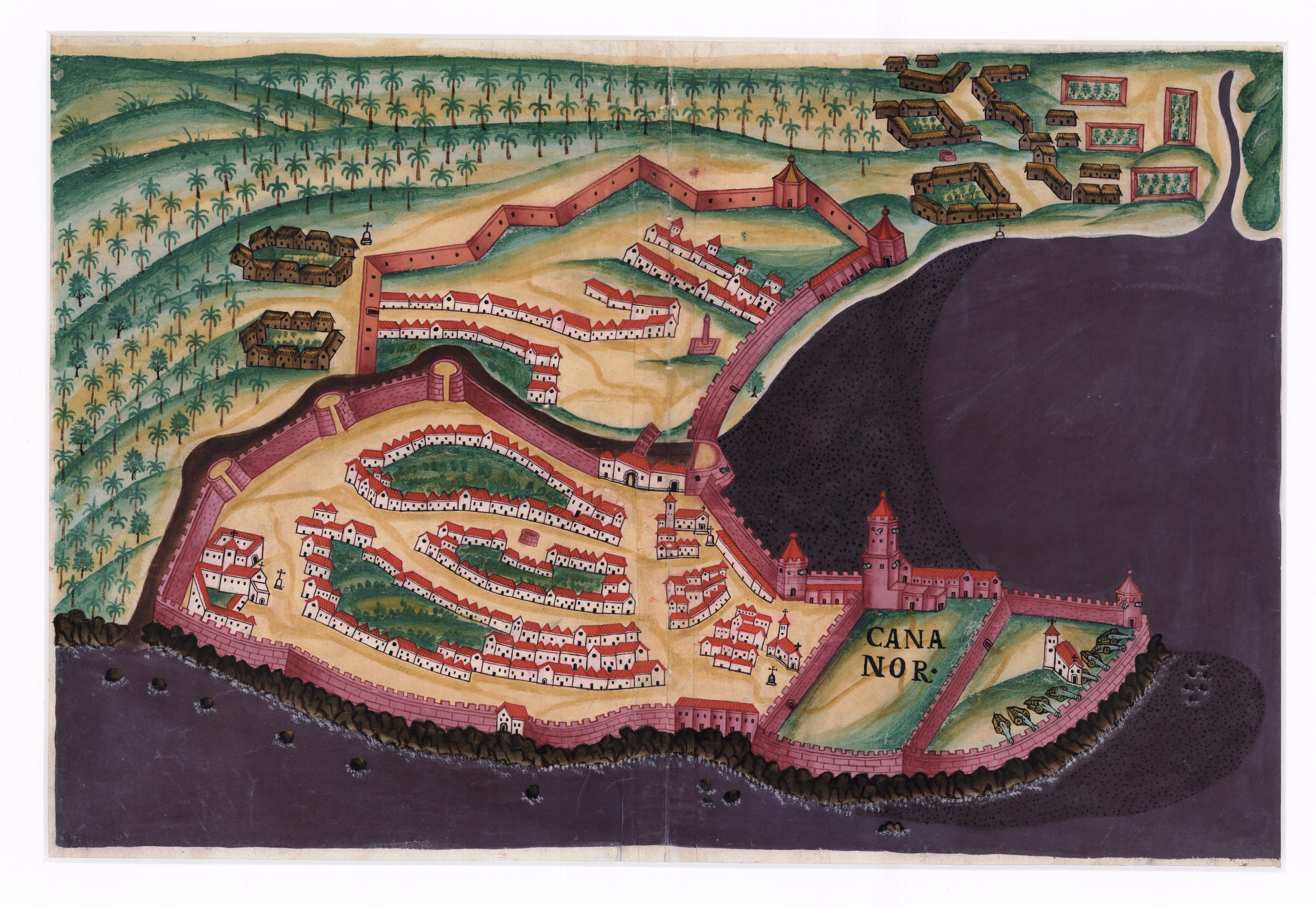
Cananor

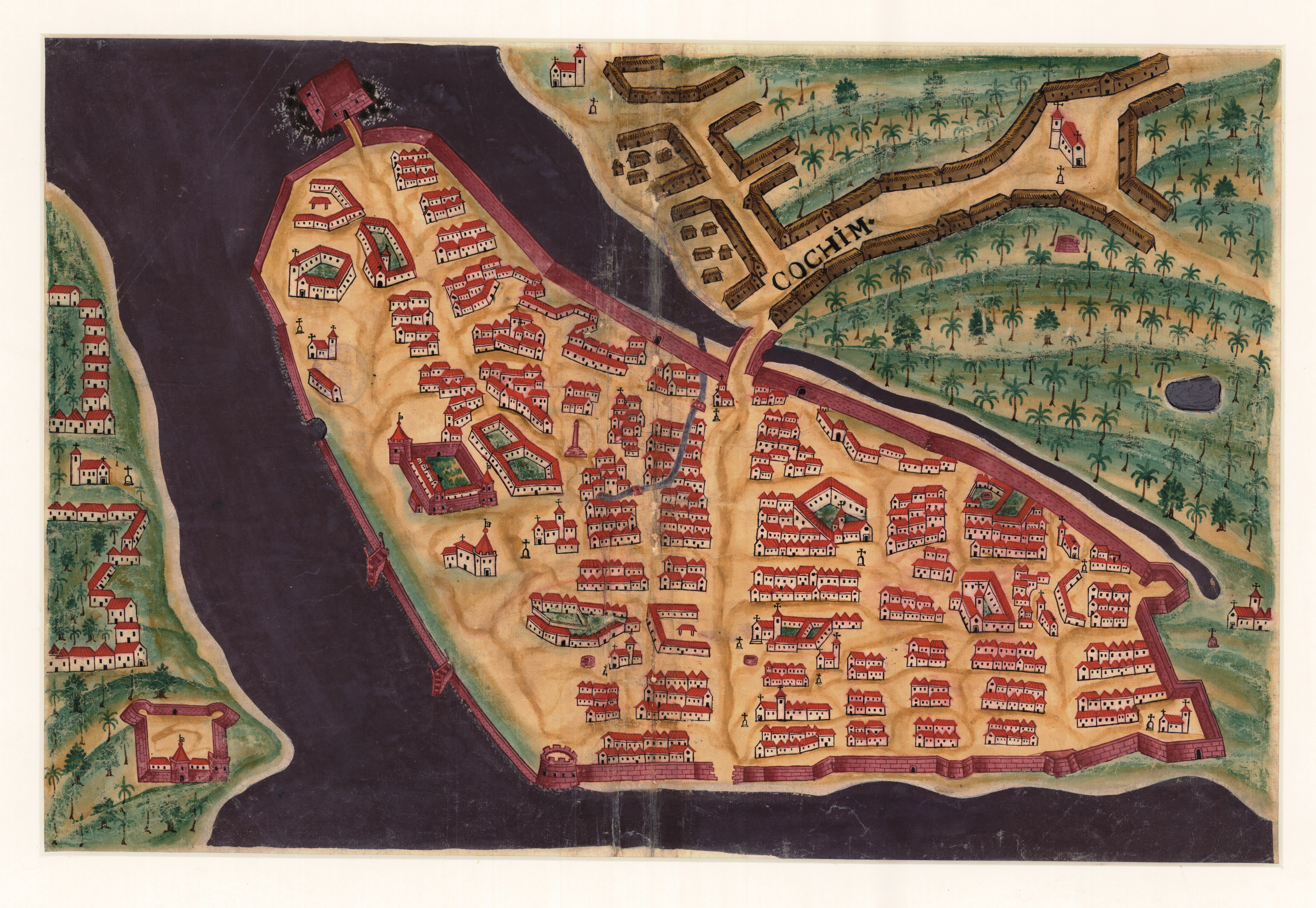
Cochim

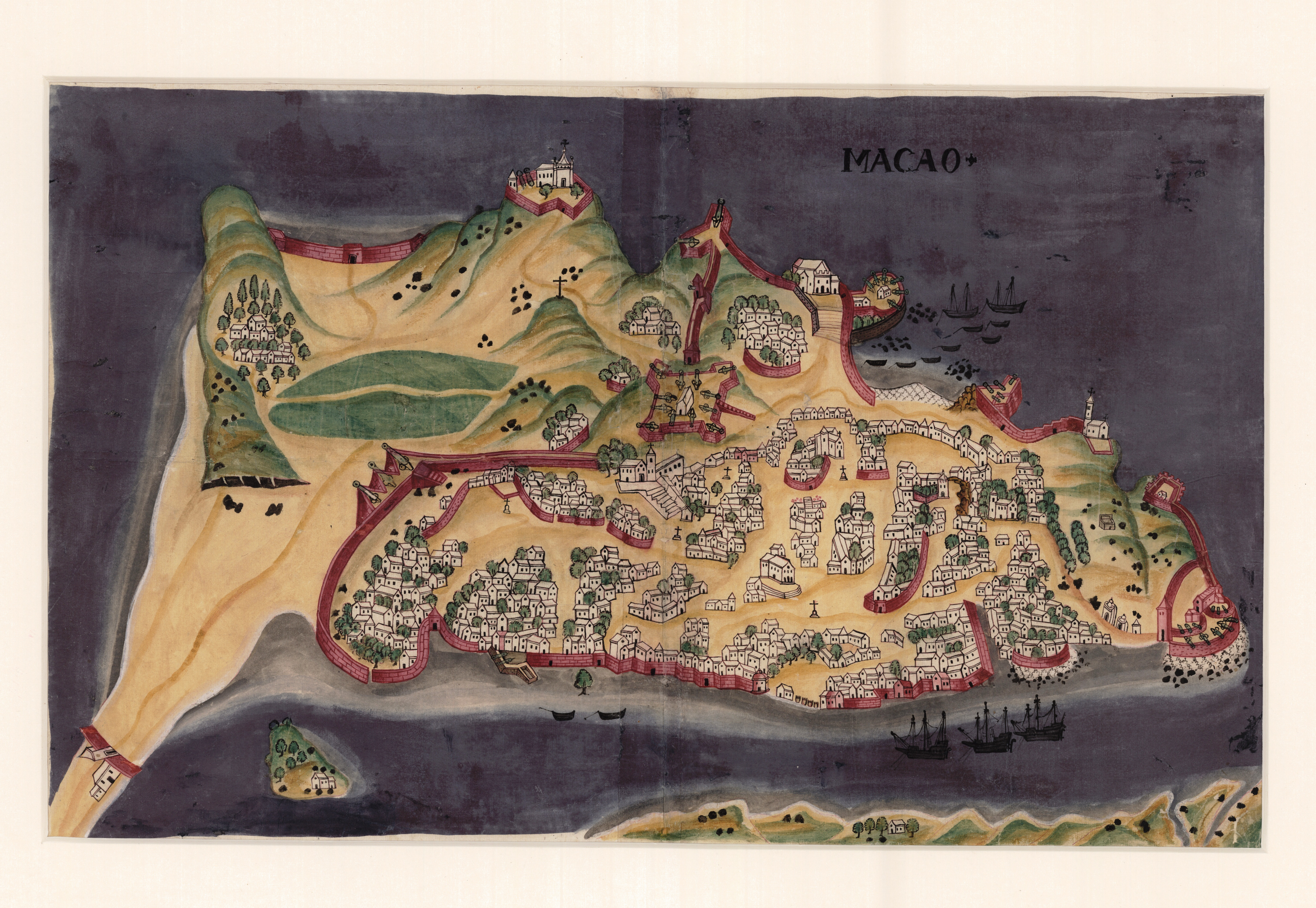
Macau

== See also ==
- Civitates orbis terrarum
- Book of Fortresses
- Manuel Godinho de Erédia
