= Carneiro =

Carneiro is a common Portuguese and Galician surname, meaning "sheep". It was very likely either a metonymic occupational name for a shepherd, or a habitational name derived from any of the several places called Carneiro in the North of Portugal.

Notable people with the surname include:

- Alberto Carneiro, Portuguese artist
- António Carneiro, Portuguese Expressionist painter, illustrator, poet and art professor
- Antônio Ernesto Gomes Carneiro, Brazilian military officer who fought in the Paraguayan War
- António de Mariz Carneiro, Portuguese nobleman who served as the official cosmographer to the Portuguese crown
- Antonio dos Reis Carneiro, Brazilian basketball administrator
- António Soares Carneiro, Portuguese military officer and politician
- Carlos Carneiro, Portuguese footballer
- Carlos Carneiro, Portuguese handballer
- Enéas Carneiro, Brazilian physician and politician
- Eva Carneiro, British sports medicine specialist
- Flávio Carneiro, Brazilian writer
- Francisco Sá Carneiro, Portuguese politician and former Prime Minister of Portugal
- Higino Carneiro, Angolan military officer and politician
- Honório Hermeto Carneiro Leão, Brazilian politician, diplomat, judge and monarchist of the Empire of Brazil
- Hugo Carneiro (born 1982), Portuguese politician
- Jessel Carneiro, Indian footballer
- Joana Carneiro, Portuguese conductor
- João Emanuel Carneiro. Brazilian screenwriter
- Jorge García Carneiro, Venezuelan politician
- José da Gama Carneiro e Sousa, Portuguese count who served as the sixth Prime Minister of Portugal
- Juliana Carneiro da Cunha, Brazilian actress
- Keirrison de Souza Carneiro, Brazilian footballer
- Lucas Carneiro (born 2004), American football player
- Luís Carlos Pereira Carneiro, Portuguese footballer
- Marcos Carneiro de Mendonça, Brazilian footballer
- Mário de Sá-Carneiro, Portuguese poet and writer
- Melchior Carneiro, Portuguese Jesuit missionary bishop
- Newton Carneiro Affonso da Costa, Brazilian mathematician, logician, and philosopher
- Paulo Henrique Carneiro Filho, Brazilian footballer
- Pedro Carneiro, Portuguese musician
- Roan Carneiro, Brazilian mixed martial artist
- Robert L. Carneiro, American anthropologist and curator of the American Museum of Natural History
- Ruan Carneiro (born 1990), Brazilian footballer
- Samara Venceslau Carneiro (born 2006), Brazilian footballer
- Tiago Carneiro, Portuguese footballer
- Tiago Carneiro da Cunha, Brazilian artist
