= Uzi, Iran =

Uzi (Persian: اوزي) may refer to two villages in Iran:

- Uzi, Kaleybar
- Uzi, Varzaqan
