= September 6, 1853, cabinet =

Conciliation cabinet
- 7th Cabinet of the Empire of Brazil

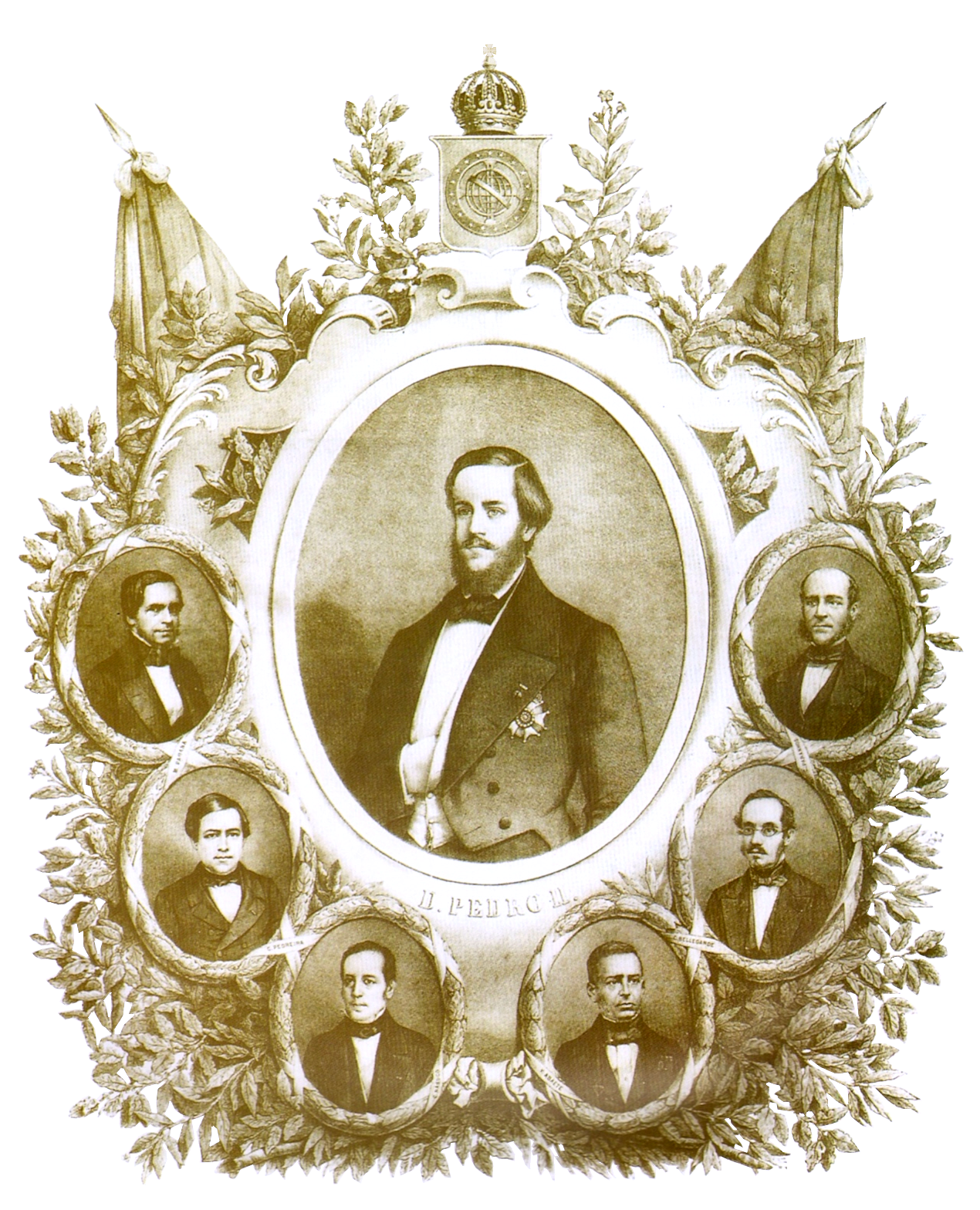
- Date formed: 6 September 1853
- Date dissolved: 3 September 1856

People and organisations
- Head of state: Pedro II
- Head of government: Marquess of Paraná
- Total no. of members: 6
- Member party: Conservative

History
- Predecessor: Itaboraí I Cabinet
- Successor: Caxias I Cabinet

The September 6, 1853 cabinet, also known as the Conciliation cabinet, was a ministry of the Empire of Brazil during the reign of Emperor Pedro II. The Council of Ministers was headed by the conservative Honório Carneiro Leão, Marquis of Paraná up to his death on September 3, 1856. The Cabinet survived him under the presidency of the Duke of Caxias up to May 4, 1857.

== The Cabinet ==
The composition of the cabinet was:

OFFICE	NAME	TERM
President of the Council of Ministers	The Marquis of Paraná	September 6, 1853–September 3, 1856
	The Duke of Caxias	September 3, 1856–May 4, 1857
Empire minister	Luís Pedreira do Couto Ferraz	September 6, 1853–May 4, 1857
Justice minister	José Tomás Nabuco de Araújo Filho	September 6, 1853–May 4, 1857
Foreign minister	The Viscount of Abaeté	September 6, 1853–June 14, 1855
	The Viscount of Rio Branco	June 14, 1855–May 4, 1857
Finance minister	The Marquis of Paraná	September 6, 1853–August 23, 1856
	The Baron of Cotegipe	August 23, 1856–May 4, 1857
Navy minister	Pedro de Alcântara Bellegarde	September 6, 1853–December 15, 1853
	The Viscount of Rio Branco	December 15, 1853–June 14, 1855
	The Baron of Cotegipe	June 14, 1855–October 8, 1856
	The Viscount of Rio Branco	October 8, 1856–May 4, 1857
War minister	Pedro de Alcântara Bellegarde	September 6, 1853–June 14, 1855
	The Duke of Caxias	June 14, 1855–May 4, 1857

== See also ==
- History of the Empire of Brazil
- Politics of the Empire of Brazil
- President of the Council of Ministers of Brazil

== Notes ==
Preceded by September 29, 1848 cabinet	September 6, 1853 cabinet September 6, 1853–May 4, 1857	Succeeded by May 4, 1857 cabinet
