= Gamarra (surname) =

Gamarra is a surname of Basque origins. Notable people with the surname include:

- Agustín Gamarra (1785–1841), 13th President of Peru
- Carlos Gamarra (born 1971), Paraguayan footballer
- Carlos Gamarra Ugaz, Peruvian politician and attorney
- Celso Fabián Ortíz Gamarra (born 1989), Paraguayan footballer
- Daniel Gamarra (born 1978), Uruguayan footballer
- Fredy José Bareiro Gamarra (born 1982), Paraguayan footballer
- José Gamarra (born 1934), Uruguayan artist
- Karen Keys-Gamarra, American politician from Virginia
- Luis Gamarra (born 1992), Bolivian singer
- Óscar Gamarra (born 1987), Paraguayan footballer
- Pedro Sánchez Gamarra, Peruvian politician
- Pierre Gamarra (1919–2009), French writer
- Roberto Gamarra (footballer born 1981), Paraguayan footballer
- Rodolfo Gamarra (born 1988), Paraguayan footballer
- Roberto Gamarra (coach) (born 1958), Argentine and naturalised Paraguayan footballer and coach
- Ronald Gamarra Herrera, Peruvian politician and lawyer
