= Flávio Carneiro =

Brazilian writer (born 1962)

Flávio Carneiro is a Brazilian writer. Born in Goiânia in 1962, he moved to Rio de Janeiro in the early 1980s and relocated to the mountain city of Teresópolis, in the state of Rio de Janeiro, in 2003. A novelist, essayist, scriptwriter, literary critic, and university lecturer, he has written twelve books and two screenplays, and teaches Brazilian and Comparative Literature at Rio de Janeiro State University (UERJ).

His fictional work includes three novels, novellas for children and young people, and a collection of short stories. He has won a number of literary awards, the most recent being the Barco a Vapor Prize, in 2007, for A Distância das Coisas (The Distance of Things). The film Bodas de Papel (Paper Wedding), which he co-wrote with Adriana Lisboa and André Sturm, won the Jury's Prize at the Pernambuco Film Festival in 2008.

== Literary Awards ==
- 3rd Barco a Vapor Prize (2007) for A Distância das Coisas (The Distance of Things)
- Tiokô Prize (2005–2007) for his body of work; Highly Recommendable for Young People Prize – FNLIJ (2001) for the novella Lalande
- Octavio de Farias Prize 1995 for the collection of short stories Da Matriz ao Beco e Depois.
- His novel A Confissão (The Confession) was a finalist in the Prêmio Jabuti and the 5th Zaffari & Bourbon Prize in 2007.

== Books ==
- A Ilha, 2011
- Passe de Letra: literatura & futebol, 2009
- A distância das coisas, 2008
- A Confissão, 2006
- Prezado Ronaldo, 2005
- No país do presente: ficção brasileira no início do século XXI, 2005
- O livro de Marco, 2003
- O Campeonato, 2002
- Entre o cristal e a chama: ensaios sobre o leitor, 2001
- Lalande, 2000
- A casa dos relógios, 1999
- Da matriz ao beco e depois, 1994
- Acorda, Rita!, 1986
- O Livro Roubado, 2014
- Devagar e Divagando, 2014
