= Barzel =

Barzel is a Hebrew surname. Notable people with the surname include:

- Amnon Barzel (1935–2025), Israeli art curator and writer
- Ann Barzel (1905–2007), American writer, critic and dance lecturer
- Baruch Barzel (born 1976), Israeli physicist and mathematician
- Helga Henselder-Barzel (1940–1995), German political scientist
- Rainer Barzel (1924–2006), German politician
- Yoram Barzel (1931–2022), American-Israeli economist
