= Gamarra Menor =

Hamlet in Álava

Gamarra Menor/Gamarra Gutxia
- Concejo
- Coat of arms

- Location within Álava Location within the Basque Country Location within Spain
- Coordinates: 42°53′03″N 2°38′49″W
- Country: Spain
- Autonomous community: Basque Country
- Province: Álava
- Comarca: Vitoria-Gasteiz
- Municipality: Vitoria-Gasteiz

Area
  - Total: 0.87 km^{2} (0.34 sq mi)
- Elevation: 515 m (1,690 ft)

Population (2022)
  - Total: 24
  - Density: 28/km^{2} (71/sq mi)
- Postal code: 01510

Gamarra Menor (Spanish pronunciation: [ɡaˈmara meˈnoɾ]) or Gamarra Gutxia (Basque pronunciation: [gamara ɣutʃi.a], alternatively in Basque: Gamarragutxia) is a hamlet and concejo in the municipality of Vitoria-Gasteiz, in Álava province, Basque Country, Spain.
