= Torrijos =

Torrijos can mean:

== People ==
- General José María de Torrijos y Uriarte (1791–1831), 19th-century Spanish Liberal politician
- Omar Torrijos (1929–1981) was a Panamanian army officer, de facto leader of Panama from 1968 to 1981, and co-negotiator of the Torrijos–Carter Treaties
- Martín Torrijos (born 1963), was the president of the Republic of Panama, from 2004 to 2009, and son of Omar Torrijos

== Places ==
- Torrijos, Spain, a municipality in the comarca of Torrijos
- Torrijos, a comarca of Spain in the province of Toledo
- Torrijos, Marinduque, a municipality of the Philippines in the province of Marinduque
