= Honório Hermeto Carneiro Leão, Marquis of Paraná =

19th-century politician, diplomat, judge, and monarchist of the Empire of Brazil

The Marquis of Paraná
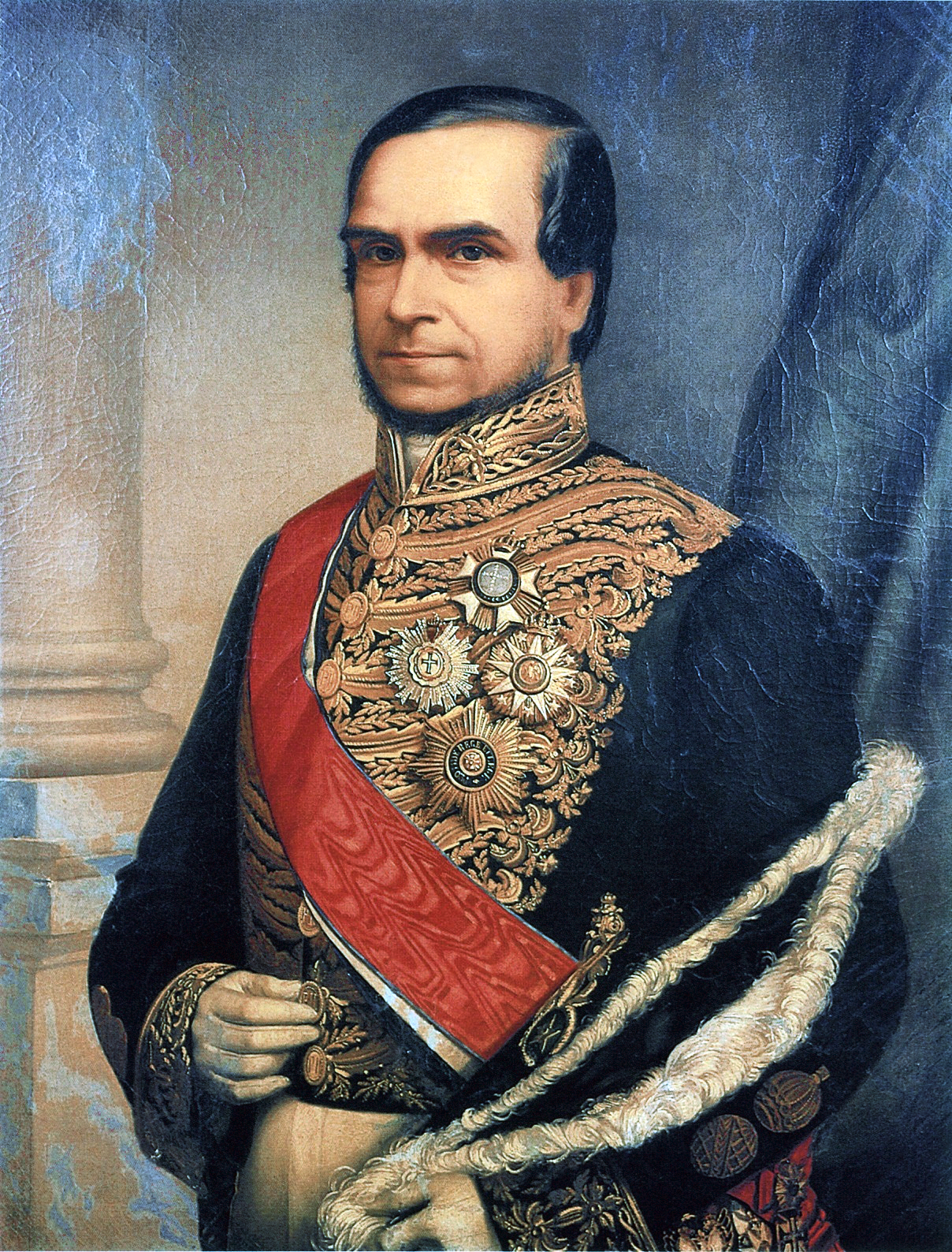
- Honório Hermeto Carneiro Leão, Marquis of Paraná, at age 55, 1856

Prime Minister of Brazil
- In office 6 September 1853 – 3 September 1856
- Monarch: Pedro II
- Preceded by: Viscount of Itaboraí
- Succeeded by: Marquis of Caxias
- In office 20 January 1843 – 2 February 1844
- Monarch: Pedro II
- Preceded by: None
- Succeeded by: Manuel Alves Branco

Personal details
- Born: 11 January 1801 Jacuí, Minas Gerais, State of Brazil
- Died: 3 September 1856 (aged 55) Rio de Janeiro, Empire of Brazil
- Party: Liberal Party (1830–1831); Moderate Party (1831–1837); Reactionary Party (1837–c. 1843); Party of Order (c. 1843–c. 1853); Conservative Party (c. 1853–1856)
- Spouse: Maria Henriqueta Neto
- Occupation: Politician

Honório Hermeto Carneiro Leão, Marquis of Paraná (11 January 1801 – 3 September 1856) was a Brazilian politician, diplomat, judge and monarchist. Paraná was born to a noble family in São Carlos do Jacuí, in what was then the captaincy of Minas Gerais. After attending the University of Coimbra in Portugal and having returned to Brazil, Paraná was appointed a judge in 1826 and later elevated to appellate court justice. In 1830, he was elected to represent Minas Gerais in the Chamber of Deputies; he was re-elected in 1834 and 1838, and held the post until 1841.

In the aftermath of emperor Pedro I's abdication in 1831, a regency created to govern Brazil during the minority of the former emperor's son, Pedro II, soon dissolved into chaos. Paraná formed a political party in 1837 that became known as the Reactionary Party, which evolved into the Party of Order in the early 1840s and in the mid-1850s into the Conservative Party. He and his party's stalwart and unconditional defence of constitutional order allowed the country to move beyond a regency plagued by factious disputes and rebellions that might easily have led to a dictatorship. Appointed president of Rio de Janeiro Province in 1841, Paraná helped put down a rebellion headed by the opposition Liberal Party the following year. Also in 1842, he was elected senator for Minas Gerais and appointed by Pedro II to the Council of State. In 1843, he became the de facto first president (prime minister) of the Council of Ministers, but resigned after a quarrel with the emperor.

After years in opposition, in 1849, Paraná was appointed by the national government as president of Pernambuco Province to investigate a Liberal rebellion that had taken place a year earlier, and seek a fair trial for the rebels. Blamed by his party colleagues for the years in opposition and having lost much of his influence within his own party, Paraná accepted the post, believing he could regain his place among his peers. With the nation internally pacified, he was sent to Uruguay in 1851 to forge an alliance with that country, and with the rebel Argentine provinces of Corrientes and Entre Ríos, against the Argentine Confederation. The alliance triumphed, and the emperor elevated Paraná to the ranks of the titled nobility.

In 1853, Paraná was again appointed president of the Council of Ministers, at the head of a highly successful cabinet, and became the most powerful politician in the country. The electoral reform he ushered in was credited with undermining national political processes and causing severe harm to the system of parliamentary government. For his role in pushing through restructuring, Paraná met with fierce opposition from the majority of his colleagues, leading to a virtual split in the Conservative Party over his policies. On 3 September 1856, while still in office and at the height of his political career, he died unexpectedly of an unknown febrile condition. He is widely regarded by historians as one of the most influential statesmen of his time.

== Early years ==
=== Birth and childhood ===
Honório Hermeto Carneiro Leão was born on 11 January 1801, in the freguesia (civil parish) of São Carlos do Jacuí, Minas Gerais, then a captaincy (later province) of the Portuguese colony of Brazil. Named after Saint Honorata, Honório Hermeto was the son of Antônio Neto Carneiro Leão and Joana Severina Augusta de Lemos. On his father's side, he was descended from Portugal's powerful Carneiro Leão clan, which had settled in Brazil in the 17th century. Antônio Neto, however, was much less prosperous than his relatives. An impoverished military officer in 1801, he held the rank of furriel (third sergeant). Advancement of his career was thwarted by his character flaws. Antônio Neto was hotheaded and had a strong personality which once led to his arrest for insubordination.

Honório Hermeto first lived in Paracatu, then moved to Vila Rica (now Ouro Preto), at that time the capital of Minas Gerais, where he spent his childhood and adolescence. His father was widowed on 10 February 1806; on 11 January 1807 he wed Rita de Cássia Soares do Couto, the daughter of his late wife's sister. Honório Hermeto regarded Rita de Cássia as his mother and her father, colonel Nicolau Soares Couto, actually raised him. Honório Hermeto had an elder sister, Balbina, and three half-sisters and a half-brother, Nicolau Neto Carneiro Leão (later Baron of Santa Maria), from his father's second marriage.

=== Education ===
At age 16, Honório Hermeto was commissioned as a lieutenant and standard-bearer of the 2nd Militia Cavalry Regiment, 1st Company, in Vila Rica. Antônio Neto made great efforts to provide Honório Hermeto with an education of much higher quality than would normally have been expected in a family of their limited financial means. The promotion to captain in 1819 increased Antônio Neto's income, allowing his eldest son to go to Portugal and enroll in the University of Coimbra's law school in 1820, thus ending Honório Hermeto's brief military career. He was an excellent student and struck up acquaintances among his fellow Brazilians in Coimbra, including Paulino Soares de Sousa (who would become one of his greatest allies and later the 1st Viscount of Uruguai) and Aureliano de Sousa Oliveira Coutinho (later Viscount of Sepetiba).

During the Portuguese Liberal Revolution of 1820, he supported the constitutionalists, who advocated a national constitution to limit the powers of the Portuguese monarchy, against the absolutists, who preferred an absolute monarchy. It is unknown whether he actively took part in the uprising, however, and if so, to what degree. Honório Hermeto was a member of a secret society called A Gruta (The Den), founded by Brazilian students at Coimbra with the primary goal of changing Brazil from a monarchy into a republic. His republicanism would fade with time and eventually be replaced by staunch support for monarchism.

Honório Hermeto received a bachelor's degree in Law in 1824, and his masters diploma on 18 June 1825. He was also employed in a law firm for a few months. He returned to Brazil on 8 August 1825 aboard a ship with other Coimbra graduates, among them Aureliano Coutinho and Joaquim Rodrigues Torres (who would later found the Conservative Party with Honório Hermeto and become the Viscount of Itaboraí). During Honório Hermeto's time in Europe his native country had gained independence from Portugal and become the Empire of Brazil.

== Entry into politics ==
=== Magistrate and politician ===
On 20 May 1826, Honório Hermeto married his 17-year-old first cousin Maria Henriqueta Neto, the daughter of his father's brother João Neto Carneiro Leme. Unlike his brother, João Neto was a rich and influential man. Honório Hermeto and Maria Henriqueta had five children: Honório, Henrique (later Baron of Paraná), Maria Emília, Maria Henriqueta and Pedro. The advantageous marriage allowed Honório Hermeto to become a slave owner, assume his uncle's business, which included domestic slave trading, and later, in the 1830s, purchase a coffee farm in the province of Rio de Janeiro. Coffee was quickly becoming Brazil's most important export commodity and was a highly lucrative crop.

Honório Hermeto pursued a typical course open to 19th century Brazilians who became affluent through family connections and patronage: a judicial career, with expectations of entering politics. On 14 October 1826, he was named to a three-year term as juiz de fora (external judge) with jurisdiction over the three villages in the province of São Paulo. On 25 August 1828, Honório Hermeto left São Paulo upon being promoted to the post of auditor da marinha (admiralty judge) in Rio de Janeiro, the imperial capital located in the province of same name. His tenure in São Paulo and Rio de Janeiro helped expand his connections. Emperor Pedro I appointed him ouvidor (superior judge) in late 1828 and desembargador (regional appeal judge) in 1829, an office Honório Hermeto held until his retirement in 1848.

Well established in the imperial capital, Honório Hermeto campaigned in 1829 to become a general deputy (member of the Chamber of Deputies, the national lower house) as a representative for his native Minas Gerais. He was elected to a seat in the legislature for the term beginning April 1830. He became a member of the Liberal Party, which stood in opposition to Pedro I and his policies. As a general deputy, Honório Hermeto had an unobtrusive role for the first couple of years, having been overshadowed by Bernardo Pereira de Vasconcelos, the leader of the deputies representing Minas Gerais. Short, slim and with a speech impediment, the dark-haired Honório Hermeto appeared an unimpressive figure at first glance. Like his father, he was headstrong, opinionated and often scathing. However, he had self-confidence and a powerful charisma, and was energetic, intelligent, perspicacious and a natural born leader.

=== Political crises ===
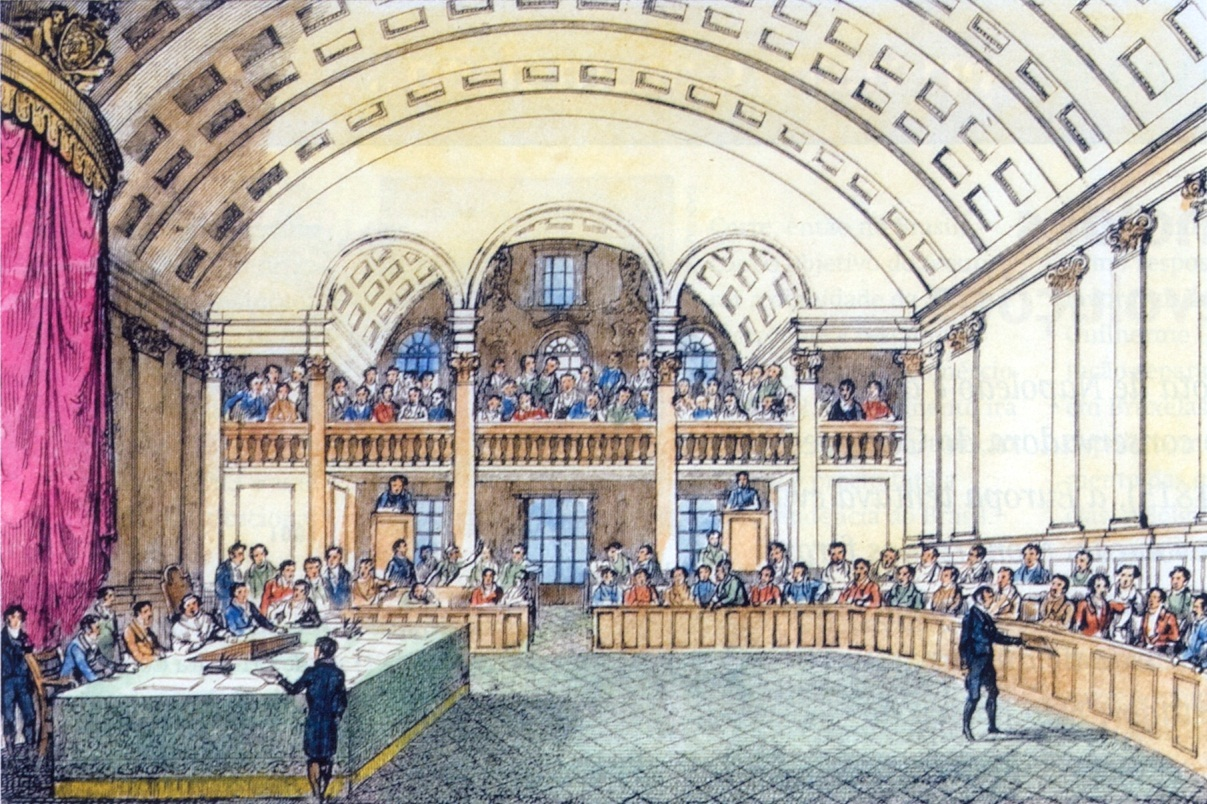
The Chamber of Deputies, the lower house in the Parliament of the Empire of Brazil

Due to the weakening of his political position and his own concomitant motives, Pedro I abdicated on 7 April 1831 and departed for Europe. Without a common cause in the person of the former emperor, the radical wing of the Liberal Party seceded. Honório Hermeto remained in the Liberal Party, which changed its name to Moderate Party to differentiate itself from its estranged radicals. Meanwhile, as the new emperor, Pedro II, was only a child of five, a regency—with little effective authority—was created. This resulted in nine years of chaos, during which the country was plagued by rebellions and coup attempts initiated by unruly political factions.

On 19 July 1831, radicals and insubordinate military officers presented the Chamber of Deputies with a list of 89 Brazilians, including senators, whom they demanded be deported. Honório Hermeto gave a speech in which he said that "neither a senator nor the most humble citizen belonging to the lowest class may be deported without having been prosecuted and convicted... Even when a citizen is an evildoer, his rights must be respected..." All the deputies but one agreed with him, and the incident was settled, with several battalions being disbanded. As an adult, Pedro II would later remember that his "style of speaking was inelegant, and he had a stutter; but it vanished when he was aroused and at all times his arguments were tight knit, and somebody wittily remarked that [Honório Hermeto,] the marquis of Paraná, when he stuttered, stuttered arguments."

A second crisis arose on 30 July 1832. A constitutional amendment effecting greater reforms was voted on and approved in the Chamber of Deputies, but still faced major opposition in the Senate. Diogo Antônio Feijó and Aureliano Coutinho, both Moderates, planned a coup d'état. Feijó would assume dictatorial powers and immediately enact the constitutional amendment, thus bypassing the Senate entirely. Honório Hermeto called on his fellow deputies to uphold the Constitution: "We need not hurt the legal order and [constitutional] principles: we can make fair laws ... and in the respected Constitution we have safe and legal ways of giving the nation what it wants... let us not violate it [the Constitution], as it is our only safeguard." He rallied the deputies to his view, and in defeating the unconstitutional proposal, the coup attempt was crushed.

== Path to conservatism ==
=== Genesis of the Conservative Party ===
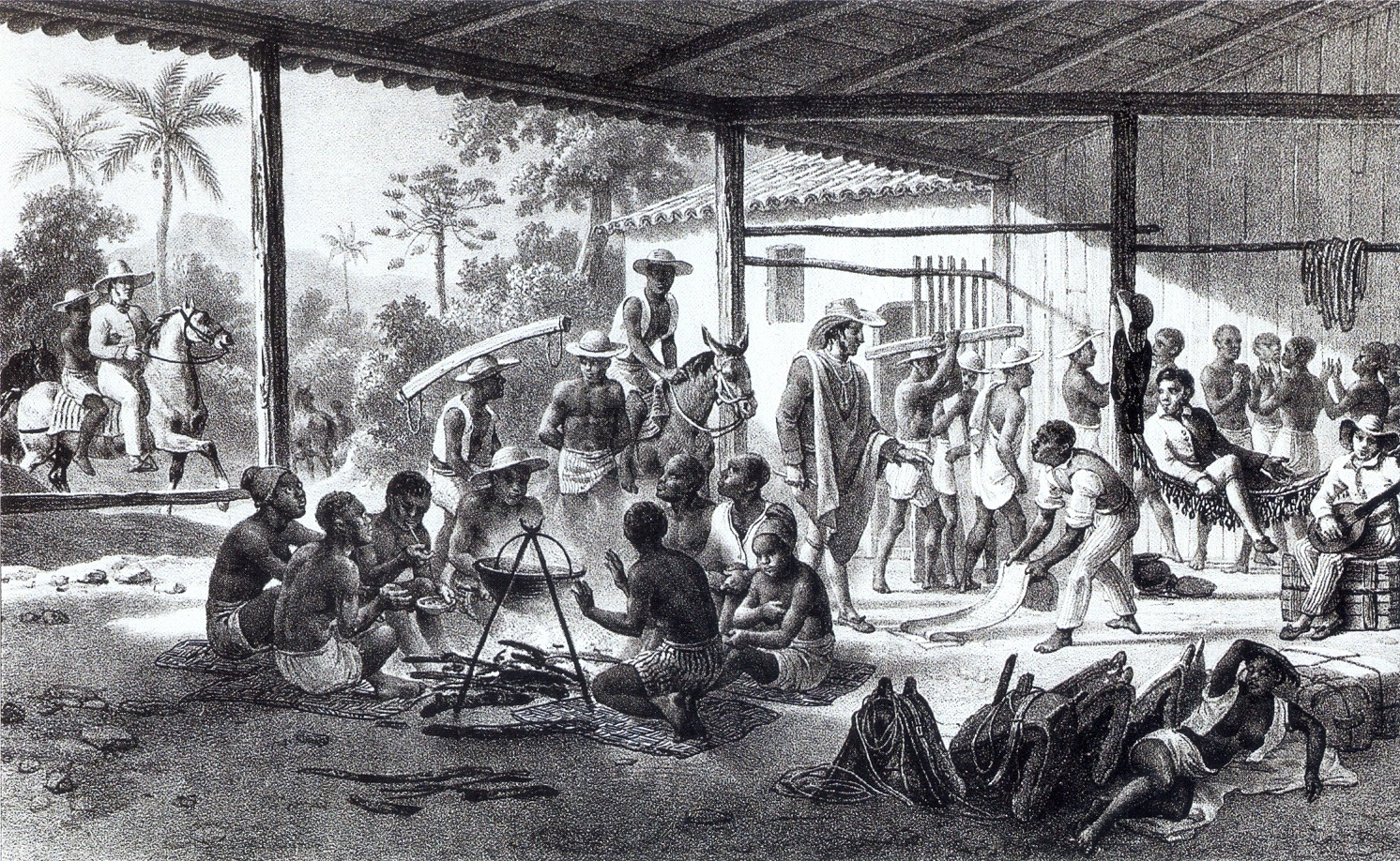
Slaves resting on their way to farms for which they were purchased. Honório Hermeto's political party had close links to planter families and merchants for whom slavery was a key component of their operations.

Honório Hermeto, by then a leading politician, was appointed Minister of Justice on 13 September 1832, effectively becoming the head of the cabinet. He resigned after eight months to avoid becoming entangled in the aftermath of an uprising in Minas Gerais, in which one of his relatives had been involved. Vasconcelos mounted a challenge to Honório Hermeto's position among his constituency, and by circulating rumors that the latter had links to the uprising, undercut his reputation at home and in the Chamber of Deputies. Honório Hermeto relinquished his post on 14 May 1833 to concentrate on shoring up his position in Minas Gerais, and won another term as general deputy.

The constitutional amendment, known as the Additional Act, which effected greater reforms that served as the catalyst for the 1832 coup attempt, was promulgated on 12 August 1834. The Act had unpredicted and catastrophic results. Local self-government opened new avenues of conflict between political parties. The party that dominated the provinces would gain control over the electoral and political system. Parties that lost by ballot, unwilling to be shut out, rebelled and tried to take power by force. Honório Hermeto and several other Moderates voted against the Additional Act, as they believed that its far-reaching reforms would cause far more harm than good. Honório Hermeto led the conservative Moderate dissidents to secede from the party when Feijó successfully ran for the position of sole regent in early 1835. Honório Hermeto was eager to forestall what he described as the "triumph of the same traitor who made 30 July [1832 coup attempt] to ignominiously tear down the Regency which had appointed him."

The conservative Moderate opposition to Feijó had close links to coffee and sugar cane planter families and merchants in the Brazilian southeast and northeast. These groups wielded great political, social and economic influence. They began to see their interests more in alignment with men like Honório Hermeto, who were planters like themselves—people who supported the slave trade with Africa and desired a centralized state able to impose order. The often strongheaded Honório Hermeto, swallowing his pride, set aside his enmity toward Vasconcelos in pursuit of an alliance. Dubbed the Reactionary Party by Feijó and his allies in 1837, the conservative Moderate opposition born in late 1834 was the genesis of what would evolve into the Party of Order (c. 1843) and finally into the Conservative Party (c. 1853).

=== Party leader in the Chamber of Deputies ===
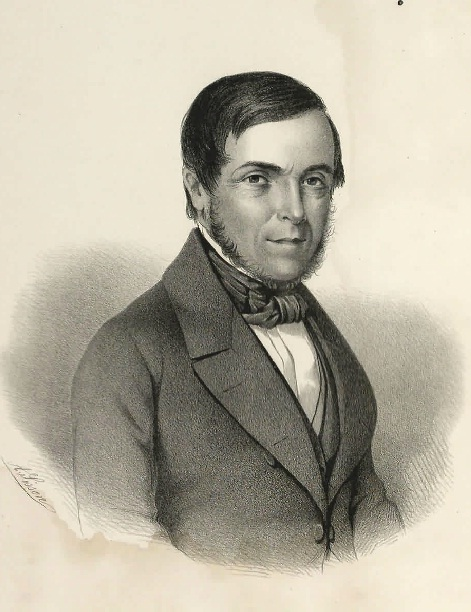
Honório Hermeto Carneiro Leão

Feijó's administration was unable to suppress the uprisings in both the north and south. By 1837, his government's credibility and support had vanished. Feijó resigned in August 1837 and Pedro de Araújo Lima (later the Marquis of Olinda), a Reactionary from Pernambuco Province, became interim regent and was elected to the office the next year. He appointed his colleagues to ministry portfolios. Honório Hermeto, who had been reelected to another term as general deputy until 1841, remained in the Chamber as the party's leader to bolster the new Reactionary cabinet. The ever-weak Moderate Party collapsed, and Feijo's Moderates allied with other groups with which they shared no common principles or ideology. During the late 1830s and early 1840s, this alliance evolved into the second Liberal Party.

The Reactionary Party (the former dissident conservative elements within the Moderate Party) began by passing the Interpretation of the Additional Act, which was followed by the reform of the Code of Criminal Procedure. Both laws, built upon the 1834 Additional Act, would allow the national government to reassert its control over provincial police and courts. They would provide the means to deal effectively with provincial rebellions and inevitably grant the national government greater sway over the provincial governments. In turn, the party in power would gain greater ascendancy in national politics through patronage and office appointments. Fearful that their adversaries would stay in power indefinitely, the Liberals began to call for Pedro II to attain majority at a younger age. They hoped to regain their influence by doing away with the regency and dealing directly with a pliable young emperor. Towards that end, the Liberals allied themselves with the Facção Áulica (Courtier Faction), led by Aureliano Coutinho (Feijó's ally in the 1832 coup attempt).

Honório Hermeto saw this new majority movement as an "attempt ... equal to that of 30 July [1832 coup]." As he had in 1832, Honório Hermeto took up a defence based on the Constitution against this threat to the political system. In May 1840, he proposed a constitutional amendment that would allow the monarch to attain majority, and assume full powers, at an earlier age. The slow process of passing a constitutional amendment ensured that the Reactionary Party would control the government at least until 1842, when Araújo Lima's term as regent would end. Facing fierce resistance from Liberals—the Chamber sessions had become embroiled in heated, often chaotic, debates—Honório Hermeto withdrew his proposal. Political and popular pressure, and even physical threats, led to the unconstitutional declaration of Pedro II's majority at age 14 on 23 July 1840.

== Rise to power and fall ==
=== Liberal rebellions of 1842 ===
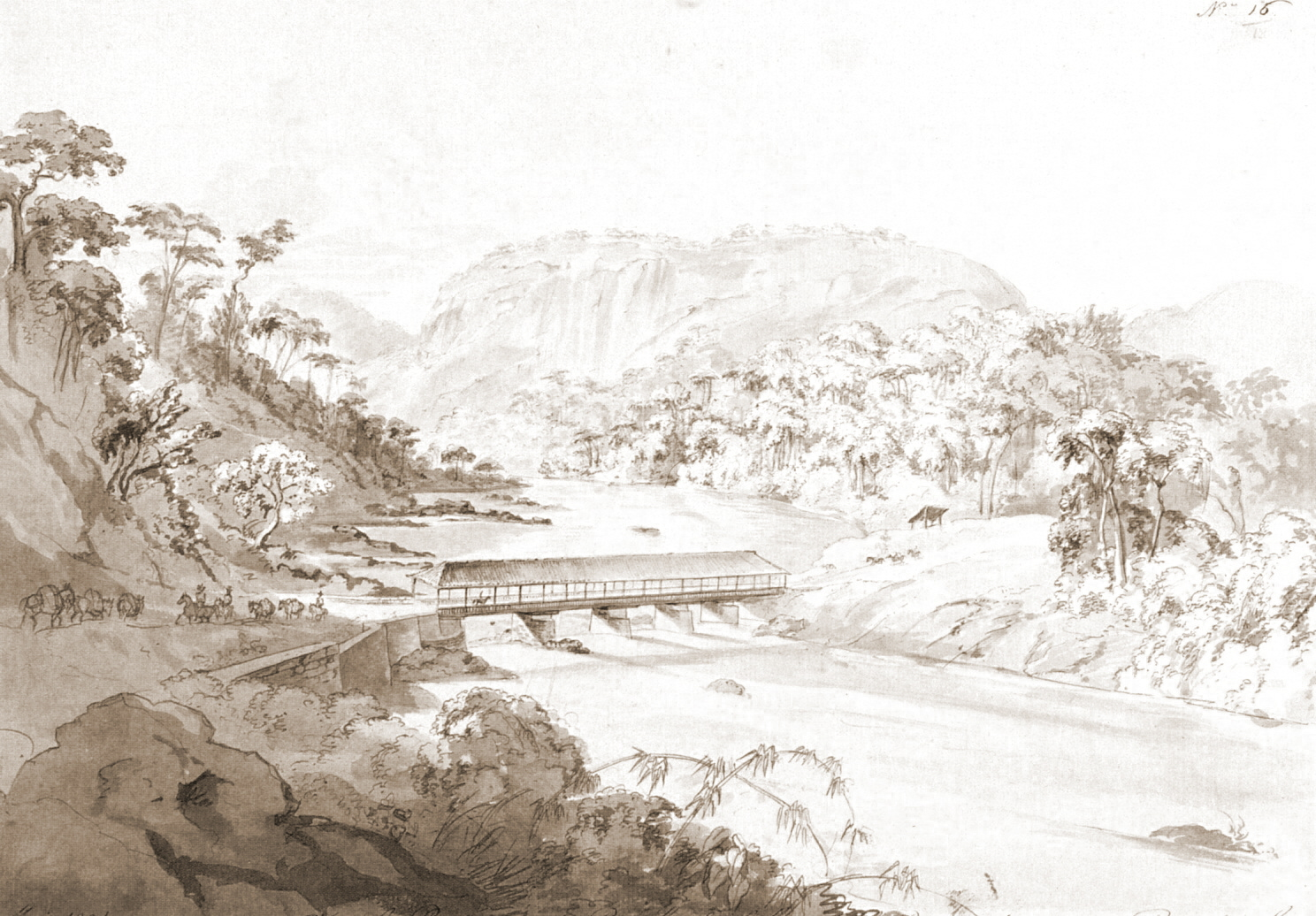
The Paraíba do Sul river on the frontier between Rio de Janeiro and Minas Gerais provinces

The Liberal-Courtier coalition's cabinet, formed upon Pedro II's assumption of full powers, convoked national elections for seats in the legislature convene in 1842. The voting was accompanied by so much violence and fraud that it became known as Elections of the club (or Elections of the truncheon). For Honório Hermeto, this meant the loss of his seat as general deputy after his bid for reelection failed. The Liberal-Courtier cabinet did not survive long, however, and its ministers presented their resignations in turn. On 23 March 1841, a new cabinet was nominated that included Aureliano Coutinho from the Courtier Faction and other ministers drawn from the Reactionary Party.

Following the return of the Reactionary Party to the government, Honório Hermeto was appointed by Pedro II to the prestigious Council of State. Under advice from the Council of State, Pedro II in May 1842 dissolved the new Chamber of Deputies, elected in the fraudulent 1840 elections, before it could be convened. Instead of attempting to get reelected, Honório Hermeto ran for a Senate seat, and being among the three candidates with the most votes, in late 1842 he was selected by the emperor as the senator representing Minas Gerais. On 2 January 1843, he took his seat next to his rival, Aureliano Coutinho, who had been elected senator for the province of Alagoas. Having already secured two lifetime positions (councillor and senator), on 4 October 1841 Honório Hermeto received an appointment as president (governor) of the province of Rio de Janeiro, and assumed this office on 1 December.

The Liberals did not take their loss of power gracefully. In May and June 1842, three uprisings broke out, in the provinces of São Paulo, Minas Gerais and Rio de Janeiro. The rebels went so far as to arrest and hold hostage both Honório Hermeto's elderly father and uncle (who was also his father-in-law). As president, he commanded the provincial National Guard, and traveled through the province to organize a response. On 1 July, he advanced with troops towards Ouro Preto, where, after defeating the rebels, he freed his father and uncle. He joined forces there with Luís Alves de Lima e Silva (then-Baron and later Duke of Caxias), who commanded the National Guard of São Paulo and Minas Gerais and was also married to one of Honório Hermeto's distant cousins. (Note: Caxias' wife, Ana Luísa de Loreto Carneiro Viana, was the granddaughter of Brás Carneiro Leão, a powerful and extremely rich merchant in late 18th and early 19th century Brazil. Brás was a distant relation to Honório's father, although genealogists are not entirely sure how they are related.) The remaining rebels were easily defeated, and by late August, the uprisings had been quelled. Among the rebel leaders was the former regent, Feijó, who was arrested. He died shortly afterwards in 1843. As Honório Hermeto returned from Minas Gerais to Rio de Janeiro, he was welcomed with celebrations and demonstrations of joy by the authorities and populace of the districts he traversed.

=== First presidency of the Council of Ministers ===
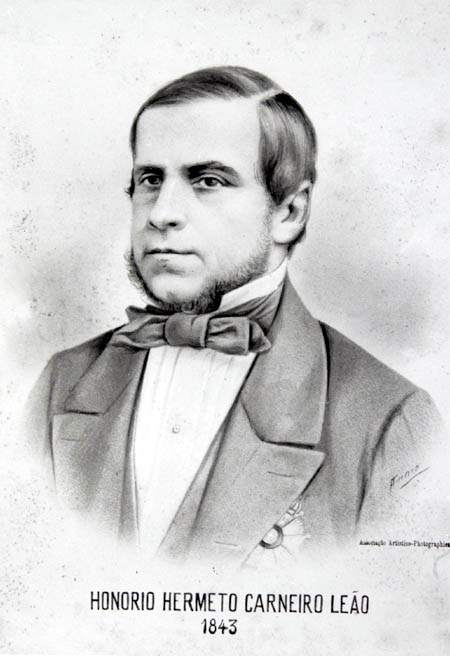
Honório Hermeto Carneiro Leão at age 42, 1843

Sometime around 1843 (and certainly by 1844), the Reactionary Party was renamed to the Party of Order to distinguish itself from what the Reactionaries perceived as the "unruly" Liberals. Members of the Party of Order became known as saquaremas. The new name also reflected the maturation of principles the party had long advocated: liberalism, exceptionalism, preserving the authority of the state and a representative parliamentary monarchy. On 20 January 1843, Pedro II appointed Honório Hermeto to head a new cabinet. By personally selecting the cabinet members, Honório Hermeto became Brazil's de facto first prime minister. Prior to this time, the emperor himself or the regents had always designated the cabinet ministers. Four years later, following Honório Hermeto's precedent, the office of prime minister would be formally instituted under the title of "president (prime minister) of the Council of Ministers". (Note: The earliest minister in Brazilian political history since the country's independence regarded as the head of a cabinet was José Bonifácio de Andrada, in 1822. Others followed intermittently, such as Diogo Antônio Feijó in 1831, Honório himself in 1832, and Bernardo Pereira de Vasconcelos in 1837. In 1843, Honório not only led the cabinet, but also named the other ministers (with the Emperor's oversight), which was unprecedented.)

A year later, in January 1844, Honório Hermeto requested that Pedro II dismiss the inspector of the Rio de Janeiro customs house, Saturnino de Sousa e Oliveira Coutinho, a younger brother of Aureliano Coutinho. Honório Hermeto had been in the same university class as Aureliano Coutinho and Saturnino Coutinho in Coimbra during the 1820s. However, his strained relationship with Aureliano Coutinho was not entirely the result of political rivalry between two ambitious men. Honório Hermeto nursed a sheer hatred toward him because of the role he had played both in the July 1832 coup and in the Majority movement. Honório Hermeto again pressed to have Saturnino Coutinho fired in late January, and when rebuffed yet again, said, "A boy does not have the right to mock men worn out in the service of the Nation, even if this boy is the emperor." Pedro II was offended and steadfastly refused to dismiss Saturnino Coutinho.

Instead of accepting the emperor's decision, Honório Hermeto offered his resignation, along with those of his colleagues. Astonished by his behavior, the emperor would say years later when recalling the incident: "Paraná não se curvava!" ("[Honório Hermeto, the Marquis of] Paraná did not bow down!") Pedro II asked the Liberals to form a new cabinet. For most of the next five years, Honório Hermeto and his Party of Order stood in opposition to the Liberals and the Courtier Faction. For the saquaremas, it meant enduring "new elections, fixed results, partisan reprisals and policy shifts". Only a few saquaremas managed to get themselves elected to the Chamber during this period. All the blame for this disaster fell upon Honório Hermeto. He lost much of his influence within the party, even though Vasconcelos alone in the Party of Order possessed the qualifications to challenge Honório Hermeto as the party's elder statesman.

== Special missions abroad ==
=== Praieira ===
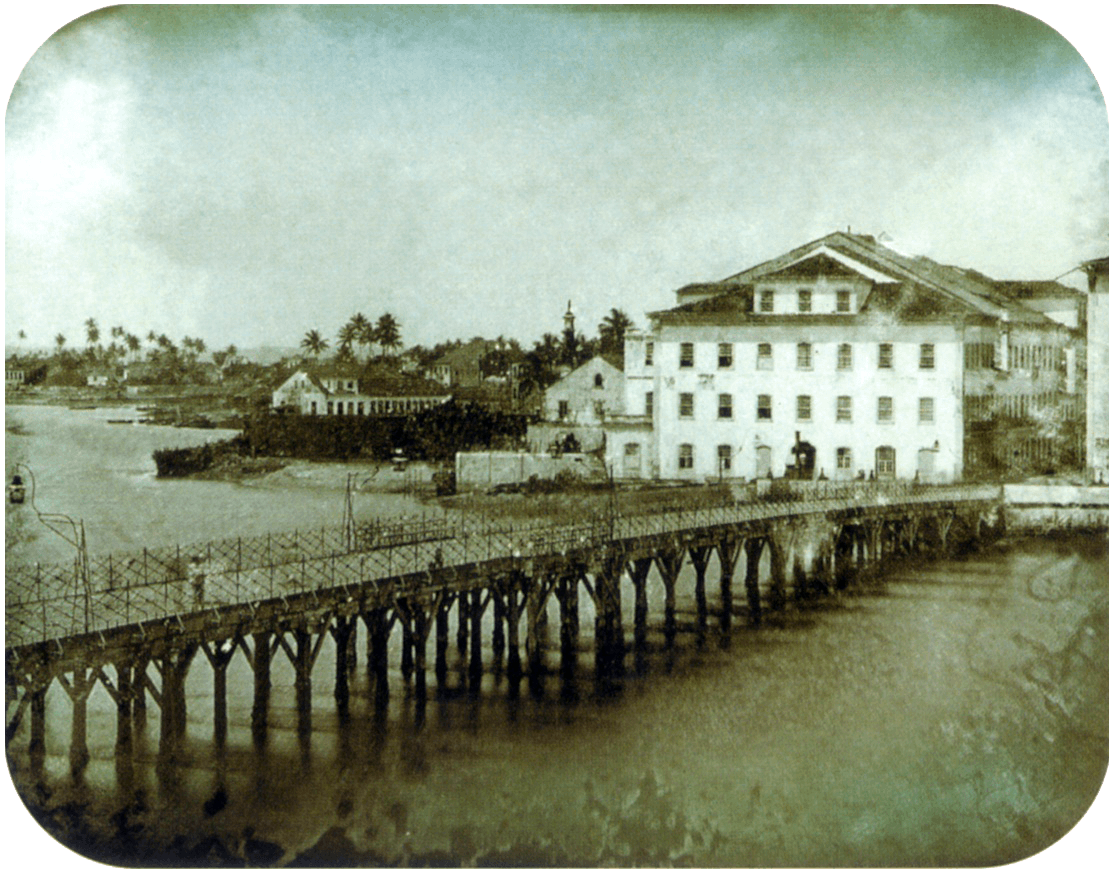
Recife, capital of Pernambuco, two years after the end of the Praieira revolt

The Courtier-Liberal alliance held near absolute sway over Brazilian politics for several years. By 1847, however, Pedro II had carefully removed members of the Courtier Faction from key positions. Aureliano Coutinho's influence was destroyed after the emperor implicitly banned him from participation in political decision making. The monarch then moved against the Liberals. From 1844 through 1848, the country saw several successive Liberal cabinets, all plagued by internal divisions. Pedro II called upon the Party of Order to form a new cabinet in September 1848.

The rise of the saquaremas ensured a purge of Liberals who had been appointed to executive and judicial posts at the national, provincial and local levels, as was normal when a new party was tapped to form a government. The most radical Liberal faction in the province of Pernambuco, known as the Partido da Praia (Beach Party), made open preparations to revolt and retake power by force. The rebellion was limited in extent and was crushed by February 1849. Honório Hermeto was appointed president of the province, from 2 July 1849 until 8 May 1850, with the purpose of pacification by restraining acts of revenge and throwing his support behind fair trials for all rebels. He had observed the effect that ostracism, by both Pedro II and other saquarema party leaders, had had on Vasconcelos' career. Honório Hermeto accepted the office, eager "to regain the favor of his emperor and to strengthen his position among his party colleagues."

He was disheartened with what he saw in Pernambuco, a province far away from the imperial capital, but one of the most important in the country. (Note: Honório wrote to Eusébio de Queirós: "The majority of the property-holders seem to me not to support the [Praieiro] party, but I note with disappointment that a good part of them are guided by a sentiment of vengeance, of pride, of personal interest, and they do not sincerely adhere to the principles of order, and even that they are capable of disturbing order, if not rebelling, by carrying out acts of oppression and violence that make them resemble a sort of feudal aristocracy... Not to speak of the hinterland, where authority and justice have no impact at all, small is the impact that they have in the districts near the coast as well, populated by sugar planters... Almost all the country and local magistrates of this province are men without education, without energy, without impact, subordinated and intimidated by the powerful and without means to do justice impartially. With such auxiliaries it seems impossible to improve the state of the province and even with good magistrates this is not going to be quick work...") Local political bosses were aligned with the Party of Order or the Liberal Party, but these were mostly nominal affiliations. Local oligarchs had vied among themselves for centuries over power. To them, political principles, such as those preached by the national leaders of the Party of Order, meant little or nothing. Their political ambitions focused on patronage and the annihilation of their local rivals. Honório Hermeto found himself embroiled in an ongoing power struggle between the aristocratic planters, who sought to exercise control over provincial affairs.

=== Platine War ===
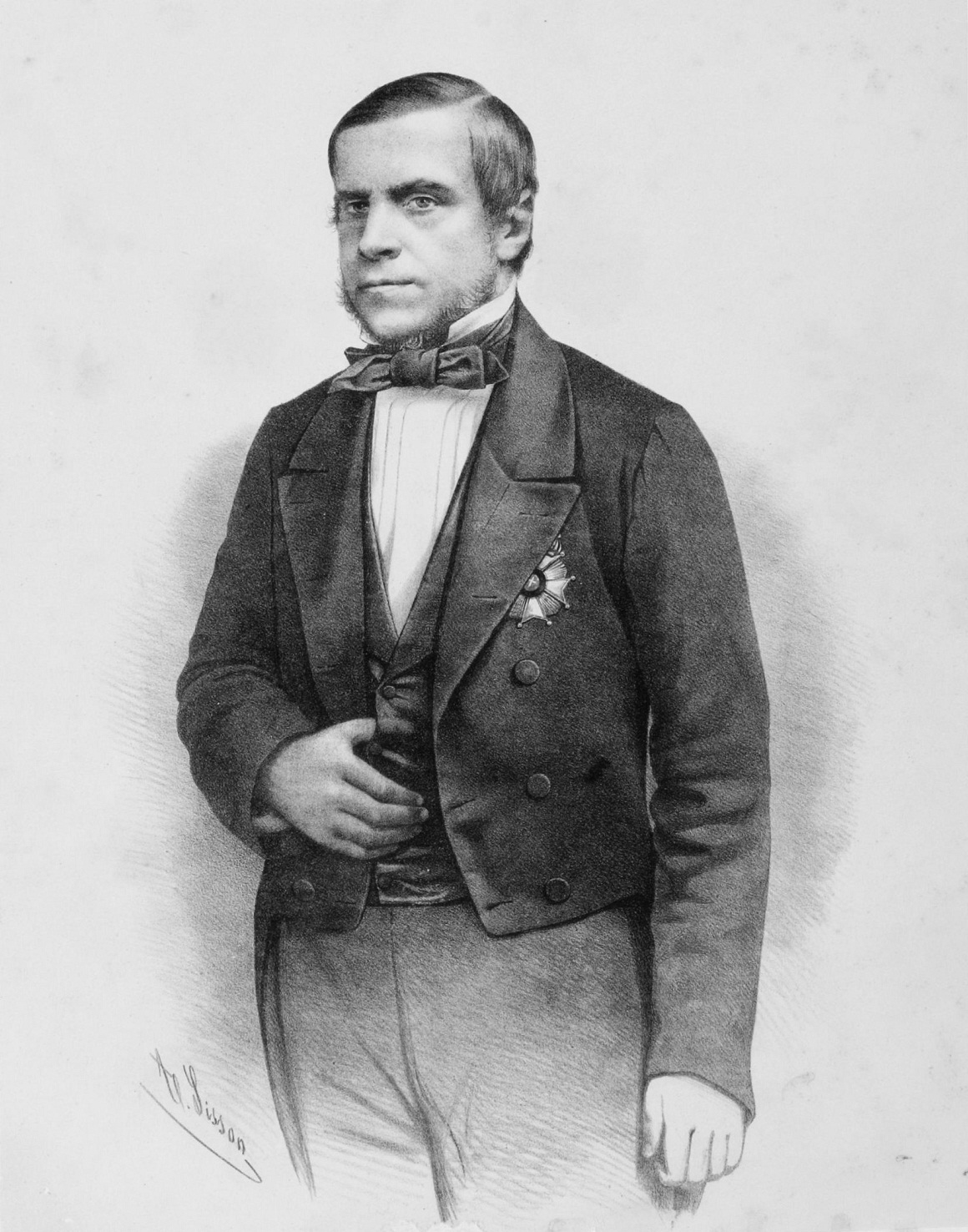
A portrait of Honório Hermeto Carneiro Leão

By mid-1850, Honório Hermeto was back in Rio de Janeiro. He had found the months in Pernambuco excruciating. Being named provincial president would have been considered a great achievement for a young politician, but it added no luster to the reputation of a seasoned politician and a founding member of his party. Instead of being at the center of power, he was put in the humiliating position of having to submit to a cabinet composed of men with less political experience, such as Joaquim Rodrigues Torres, (Note: Rodrigues Torres was, along with Honório Hermeto and Vasconcelos, one of the main founders of what would later become the Conservative Party. However, Vasconcelos was elected general deputy in the legislature that began in 1826, Honório in 1830 and Rodrigues Torres in 1834 (although he had been Minister of the Navy from 1832 until 1834), which made the latter younger, in politics, than the other two.) Paulino Soares de Sousa (Honório Hermeto's colleague along with Rodrigues Torres in Coimbra) and Eusébio de Queirós. It was particularly grating being subordinated to Paulino Soares and Eusébio de Queirós, protégés whom Honório Hermeto had advanced during the 1830s. While in Pernambuco, Honório Hermeto's actions were frequently reviewed and overturned by the cabinet, often with Eusébio de Queirós leading the criticism.

As Brazil had been pacified after the end of the last rebellion (the Praieira revolt), the country's government turned its attention to the growing tensions with its neighbor to the south, the Argentine Confederation. Paulino Soares, who served as Minister of Foreign Affairs, decided to forge alliances with Uruguay and Paraguay, nations which also saw a threat in the ambitions of Juan Manuel de Rosas, dictator of the Argentine Confederation. An army commanded by Caxias crossed into Uruguay in September 1851. More than a year had passed since Honório Hermeto returned from Pernambuco, when he was named by Paulino Soares as special minister plenipotentiary in the Platine region. On 12 October 1851, Honório Hermeto and an Uruguayan envoy signed a treaty in Rio de Janeiro setting the international border between Brazil and Uruguay. The agreement required Uruguay to abandon some claims to disputed areas in exchange for Brazilian aid in the war against Argentina.

Honório Hermeto departed for Montevideo, the capital of Uruguay, on 23 October. He chose José Maria da Silva Paranhos (later Viscount of Rio Branco) to assist him. Paranhos was a brilliant young man who had once been a Liberal Party member and protégé of the disgraced Aureliano Coutinho. This surprising choice was a clear signal from Honório Hermeto to his colleagues in the cabinet of his independence. On 21 November, Honório Hermeto signed a treaty of alliance with Uruguay and the rebel Argentine provinces of Entre Ríos and Corrientes. On 3 February 1852, the allies defeated Rosas in the battle of Caseros, who fled to the United Kingdom. As a reward for his role, the emperor granted Honório Hermeto the title of Visconde de Paraná (Viscount of Paraná) in July 1852. The title was derived from the Paraná River, a tributary of the Río de la Plata, upon which free passage rights for Brazilian shipping was secured after Rosas' downfall.

== Conciliation cabinet ==
=== Second presidency of the Council of Ministers ===
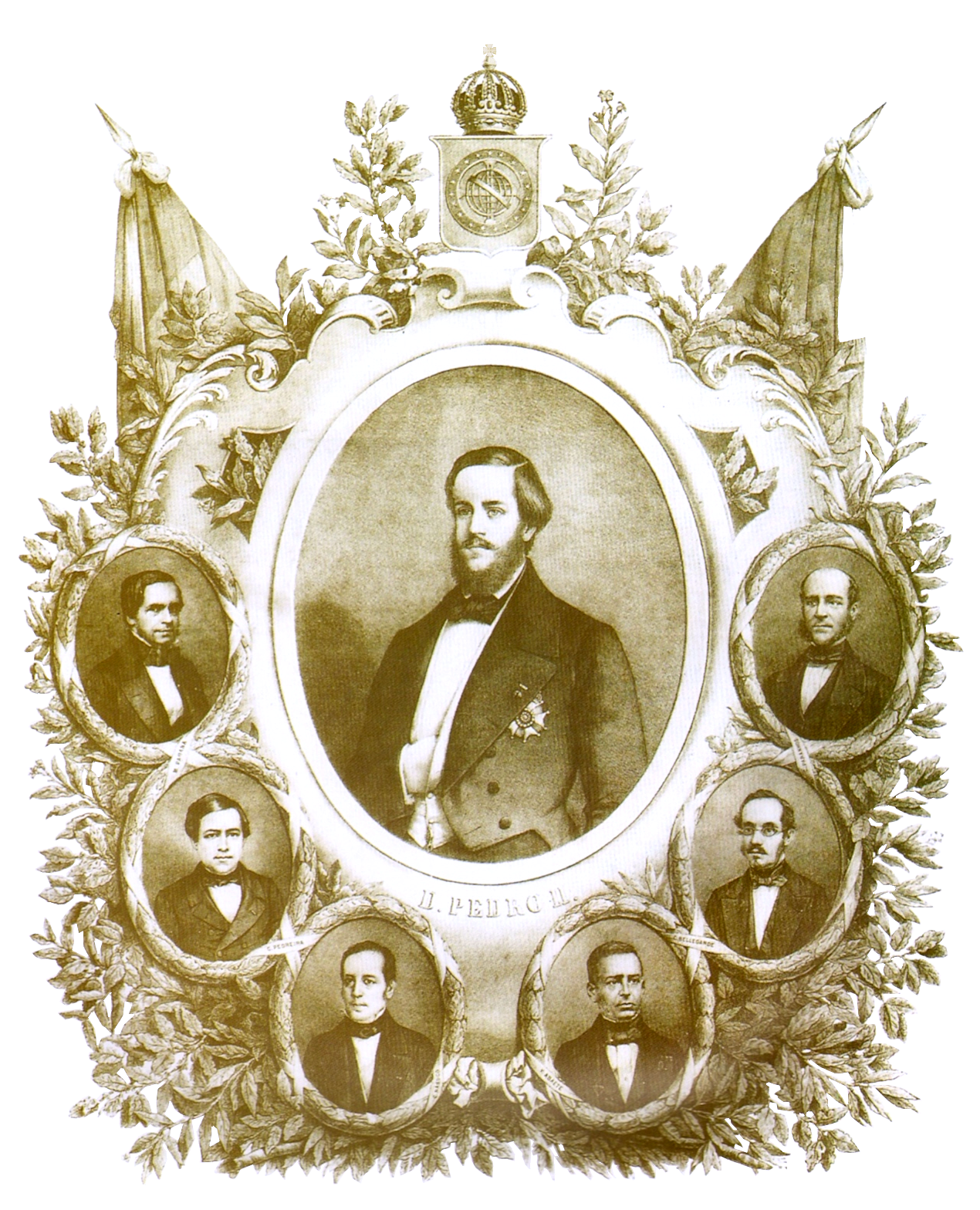
The Conciliation Cabinet. Emperor Pedro II in the center; Paraná at the far left; and José Paranhos on the far right.

After years of frustration, Honório Hermeto (or Paraná as he became known) had largely recouped the prestige he had formerly possessed among his peers. He had liquidated his uncle's domestic slave trading business and used the proceeds to become a coffee plantation owner in 1836. The land he acquired was located in the hills between Rio de Janeiro and Minas Gerais. Although Paraná staunchly opposed the abolition of the transatlantic African slave trade, the importation of slaves was abolished in 1850 by the Eusébio de Queirós Law. The ban on slave imports seems to have had no impact over Paraná's private affairs; by 1852, he had become a very wealthy man. He also married his son Honório to a niece of Rodrigues Torres, thus establishing a link between his family and the province of Rio de Janeiro's planter aristocracy.

Around 1853 (certainly by 1855), the old Party of Order had become widely known as the Conservative Party. On 6 September 1853, Pedro II called Paraná to the Imperial Palace in São Cristóvão and asked him to organize a new cabinet. After nearly ten years, the two men had made peace with one another. The emperor wished to advance his own ambitious program: the conciliação (conciliation) and melhoramentos (material developments). Pedro II's reforms aimed to promote less political partisanship, and forward infrastructure and economic development. Rather than ushering in a government led by the Conservative Party, the emperor had appointed the leading Conservative "to lead a non-partisan reform administration to realize material developments".

Paraná appointed politicians who had few, or no, links to the saquaremas to fill the new cabinet's ministry portfolios. These men were either more loyal to the emperor than to the party, too new to the Conservative Party to have formed close ties with the older saquarema establishment or former Liberals who had defected to the Conservatives following the Praieira revolt in the late 1840s. Two former Liberals found seats in the cabinet, including Paranhos, for whom Paraná secured a seat in the Chamber of Deputies. Other nominations went to saquaremas whose personal fealty to Pedro II was paramount. Among these was Caxias, with whom Paraná had developed a working relationship and then a close friendship. The resulting "Conciliation cabinet" owed its chief loyalties to Pedro II and Paraná, rather than to the Conservative Party. The cabinet thus represented a break with the Reactionary views of the old Party of Order, albeit under a party banner which still included members of the old guard.

=== Struggle over electoral reform ===
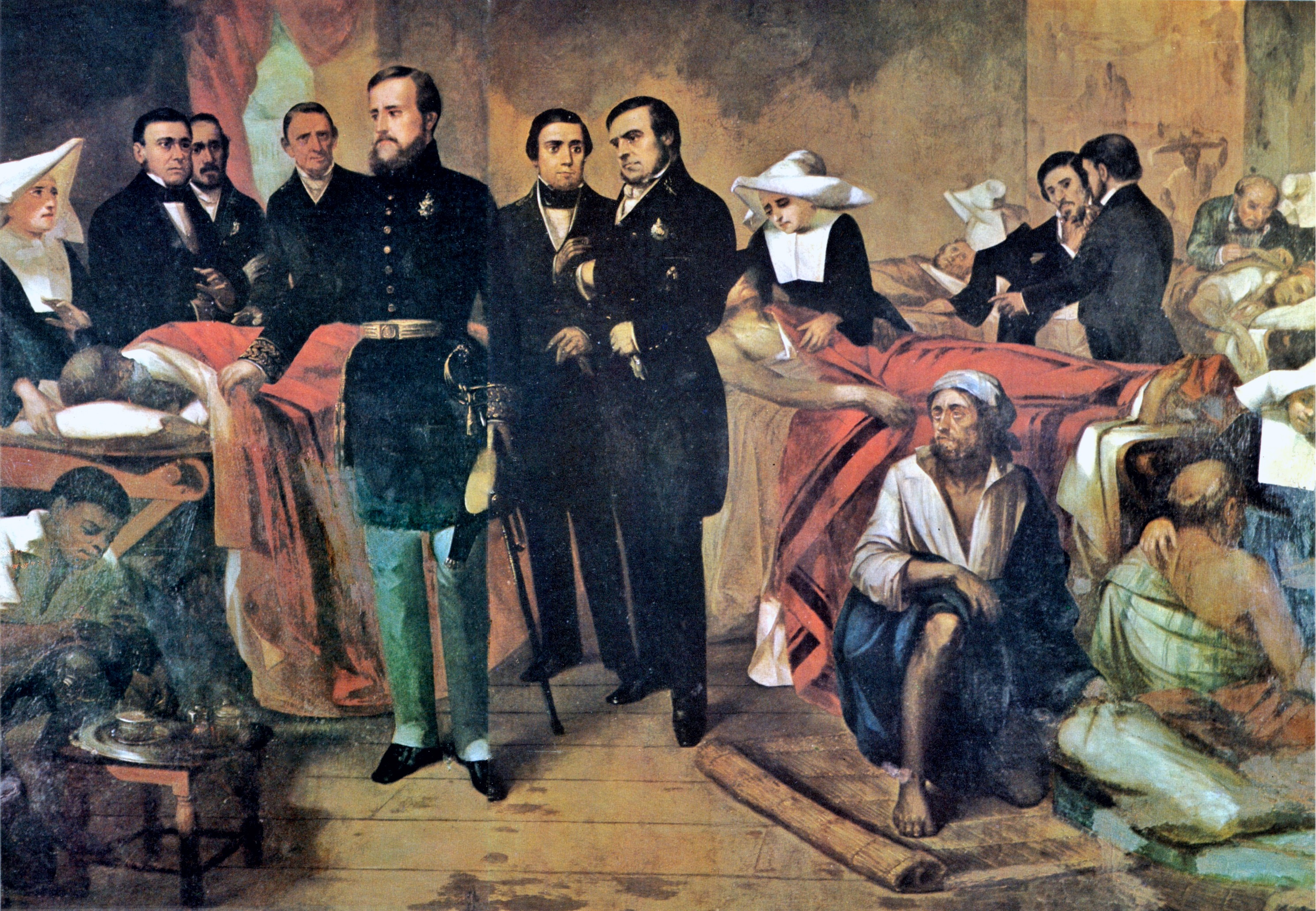
Pedro II (left), Honório Hermeto, Marquis of Paraná (center), and other ministers of state visiting victims of cholera, 1855

Formed in late 1853, the Conciliation cabinet faced the Parliament only when it gathered in May 1854. Paraná presented a bill to reform the Code of Criminal Procedure, which had already been reformed in 1841. In search of support, Paraná went as far as to aid Liberal candidates in the 1854 provincial elections. The opposition by most saquaremas to this judicial reform was so fierce that a year later, Paraná (who had been raised from Viscount to Marquis in late 1854) backed down and implicitly withdrew the bill.

Almost concurrently, he presented a bill of electoral reform that was also vehemently opposed by the saquaremas. Historian Jeffrey D. Needell states that the saquaremas "had seen him, one of their own chieftains, pick a cabinet of relatively weak men, men he could dominate. They saw an explicit attack on party government and party deals, using patronage alone to secure support. They saw that the loyalty of the ministers was principally toward Paraná, the emperor, and a non-partisan approach to patronage (which ipso facto, undercut their party and strengthened the cabinet)." Saquaremas found it harder to accept the cabinet's aid being diverted—in an attempt to secure more support for cabinet initiatives—from themselves to Liberal candidates in provincial and general elections.

During his time in Pernambuco (1849–1850), Paraná had experienced first-hand how the party's principles were seen as irrelevant and ignored at local and provincial levels. A cabinet could gain the backing of local bosses for its national candidates using patronage alone. Paraná did not need the support of the saquaremas, he could find it elsewhere. Throughout his life, Paraná managed to set aside past grievances when doing so could further opportune alliances. As Eusébio de Queirós said of Paraná, "like all men of strong temperament, he tends more to exaggerate his generosity towards his conquered enemies than in accommodations to conquering friends."

=== Apogee and unexpected death ===
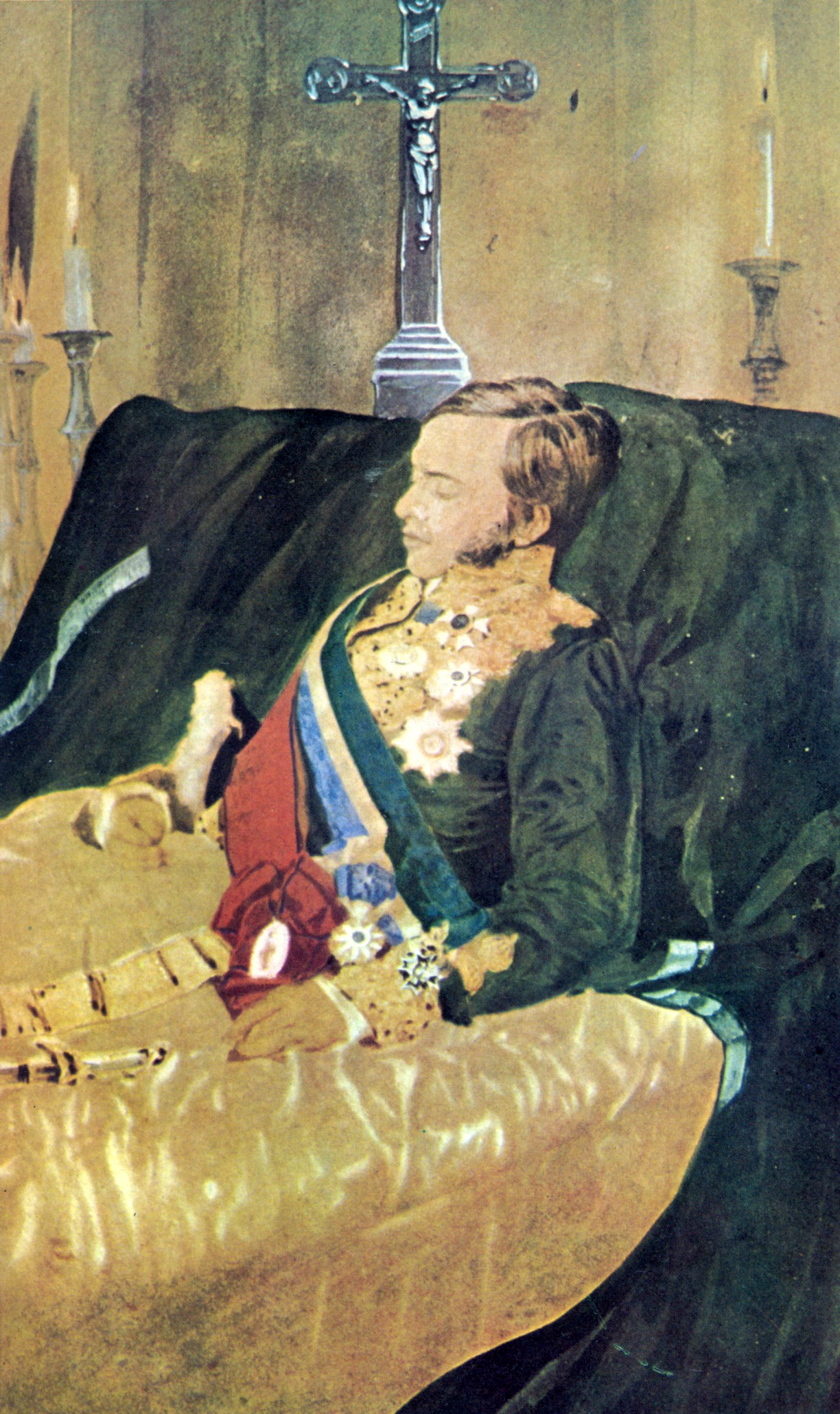
The Marquis of Paraná on his deathbed, 1856

In the end, both the Senate and the Chamber passed the electoral reform—which became known as Lei dos Círculos (Law of the Circles)—by a bare margin. The majority of the saquaremas voted against the bill. Paraná succeeded because, as founder and leader of the Conservative Party, he "had enormous charisma and a broad personal clientele in the Chamber" and "could (and did) dispense power, prestige, and patronage." Some saquaremas voted in favor of the reform out of fear, believing that, should the cabinet fall, the emperor might turn to the Liberals to form a new cabinet, resulting in reprisals and loss of offices throughout the country. On the other hand, the Liberals supported the reform as a means to further weaken the divided Conservative Party.

The electoral reform had given Paraná unassailable dominance over the cabinet and in parliament. By September 1855, with the sole exception of the emperor, Paraná had become the most prominent figure in the empire. He was nicknamed El Rei Honório (Honório the King) by his foes. However, he would not live long to enjoy his supremacy. At the end of August 1856, enraged by an offensive speech by Pedro de Araújo Lima, Marquis of Olinda (former regent in the late 1830s) in the Senate, Paraná rose to respond. As he spoke, Paraná fell to the ground in pain. Days passed and his condition worsened. On 3 September 1856, at 07:15 in the morning, he died. In a fever-induced delirium, Paraná believed himself to be still delivering a speech to Olinda. His last words were, "Skepticism ... the noble senator ... fatherland ... freedom." The exact cause of Paraná's death was never established. Doctors could not agree whether the illness was a consequence of hepatitis, pneumonia, disease in the liver, lungs, intestines or something else.

Pedro II lamented the death of Paraná, saying, "I can see no one else possessed of the energy with which the late Marquis was endowed, and joined to it uncommon talents, even if they were unpolished." His death had a profound impact on the government and the Brazilian people. He was honored with a grand funeral procession attended by a huge crowd, then a rare event in Brazil. His remains were interred in the Cemitério São João Batista (Cemetery of Saint John the Baptist) in Rio de Janeiro.

== Legacy ==
By the early 1850s, Paraná had seen both his main foes–Aureliano Coutinho and Feijó–and their political factions fall into oblivion, while he rose to power. Eusébio de Queirós, his main rival within the Conservative Party, had attempted to rally the saquaremas against his project, and failed. Eusébio de Queirós and Paraná carried on their power struggle during debates in the Senate, and in the end, Paraná emerged victorious. His success came at the expense of his weakened and deeply divided party. Just as serious were the consequences of the Law of the Circles. In theory, Paraná's initiatives for judicial and electoral reform would have ensured fairer elections, since they attempted to curtail the corrupting influence of political parties on elections. In practice, however, the opposite happened; tampering by parties was merely replaced by greater interference by the cabinet. Paraná probably knew that the reform, as enacted, had the potential to do more harm than good, as it gave him unprecedented control over national politics. According to Needell, "Paraná might well have seen the cabinet and its victory as his personal vindication before the party rivals and his monarch, his political triumph after the dismissal of 1844 and the second-rank status and saquarema disrespect of 1850."

Since his death, Paraná has been widely praised by historians and others for his political achievements, although the detrimental consequences of the electoral reform in his Conciliation cabinet were generally ignored by historians until recently. This oversight can be seen in the writings of many renowned writers and historians since the 19th-century cabinet. Conservative politician and writer José de Alencar called Paraná a "distinguished statesman". Writer Joaquim Manuel de Macedo said that "the marquis of Paraná was a politician well suited to the great State crises, and to a time of most difficult and contentious political strife." Joaquim Nabuco, who viewed him a statesman, summarized his character as that of a man "made not only to dominate, but also to lead." José Paranhos, Baron of Rio Branco regarded him an "illustrious statesman". Euclides da Cunha, who also called him a statesman, labeled him a "great man" who "demarcates a decisive stretch in our [Brazilian] Constitutional history".

Many historians praised Paraná. Maurílio de Gouveia regarded him as a statesman who revealed "himself to posterity as an example of tenacity, energy, patriotism and honor". To Heitor Lira, Paraná "was one of the pillars responsible for the political stability of Pedro II's reign. His policy of conciliation ended a period of rebellions, and led to the appearance of a new generation of monarchist politicians raised "in the school of tolerance, mutual respect and public interest"; which produced "the constitutional environment where the two great [political] parties of the Monarchy would take turns [in power] without excluding each other." Fernando da Cruz Gouvêa called him an "authentic statesman". Aldo Janotti considered Paraná, alongside Vasconcelos, responsible for the maintenance of Brazilian unity and preventing its territorial dismemberment. According to Hermes Vieira, he was a "great statesman". "Of all politicians of imperial Brazil, it is without a doubt," said historian Hélio Viana, "Honório Hermeto Carneiro Leão, Marquis of Paraná, the one who deserves to be called statesman". Ronaldo Vainfas considered him one of the greatest statesmen in Brazilian imperial history.

== Titles and honors ==
Arms of the Marquis of Paraná: the quartered arms of the Neto and Carneiro families. Its motto was Cor unum via una (one heart, one way).

=== Nobility ===
- Viscount of Paraná (Grandee) on 26 June 1852.
- Marquis of Paraná on 2 December 1854.

=== Other ===
- Member of the Brazilian Council of State.
- Member of the Brazilian Historic and Geographic Institute.
- Provedor (steward) of the Santa Casa de Misericórdia (Holy House of Mercy) in Rio de Janeiro city (1854–1856).

=== Honors ===
- Grand Cross of the Brazilian Order of Christ awarded on 18 March 1851.
- Grand Cross of the Portuguese Order of the Immaculate Conception of Vila Viçosa awarded on 26 January 1856.
- Grand Cross of the Russian Order of the White Eagle.
- Officer of the Brazilian Order of the Southern Cross awarded on 10 August 1841.
- Officer of the Brazilian Order of the Rose.

== Footnotes ==
Political offices
Preceded by Pedro de Araújo Lima, Marquis of Olinda	Minister of Justice; 13 September 1832 – 14 May 1833	Succeeded by Cândido José de Araújo Viana, Marquis of Sapucaí
Preceded by Manuel José de Sousa França	President of Rio de Janeiro province 1 December 1841 – 2 March 1843	Succeeded by João Caldas Viana
Preceded by None	President of the Council of Ministers (de facto); 20 January 1843 – 2 February 1844	Succeeded by Manuel Alves Branco, 2nd Viscount of Caravelas
Preceded by Paulino Soares de Sousa, 1st Viscount of Uruguai	Minister of Justice; 20 January 1843 – 2 February 1844	Succeeded by Manuel Alves Branco, 2nd Viscount of Caravelas
Preceded by Aureliano Coutinho, Viscount of Sepetiba	Minister of Foreign Affairs (interim); 20 January 1843 – 8 June 1843	Succeeded by Paulino Soares de Sousa, 1st Viscount of Uruguai
Preceded by Manuel Vieira Tosta	President of Pernambuco province 2 July 1849 – 8 May 1850	Succeeded by José Ildefonso de Sousa Ramos
Preceded by Joaquim Rodrigues Torres, Viscount of Itaboraí	President of the Council of Ministers; 6 September 1853 – 3 September 1856	Succeeded by Luís Alves de Lima e Silva, Duke of Caxias
Preceded by Manuel Felizardo de Sousa e Melo	Minister of Finance; 6 September 1853 – 23 August 1856	Succeeded by João Maurício Vanderlei, Baron of Cotejipe
