= Pedro Sánchez Gamarra =

Peruvian politician

Minister of Energy and Mines of Peru
- In office 14 October 2008 – 28 July 2011
- President: Alan García

Personal details
- Born: Peru
- Education: George Washington University
- Occupation: Engineer, politician

Pedro Sánchez Gamarra is the current Peruvian Minister of Energy and Mining under President Alan García since October 2008.

== Biography ==
Pedro Sánchez Gamarra received a Master's degree from George Washington University in Washington, DC. He has been the Executive Director of COPRI, PROMCEPRI and SIDEC, and the Chairman of ELECTROPERU, ELECTROLIMA, EDEGEL, EGENOR, ETEVENSA, and Electro Sur Este.
