= Uziel (disambiguation) =

Uziel is a surname

Uziel may also refer to:

- Uziel (angel)
- Beit Uziel, moshav in Israel
