= General Carneiro, Mato Grosso =

General Carneiro
- Municipality
- The Municipality of General Carneiro
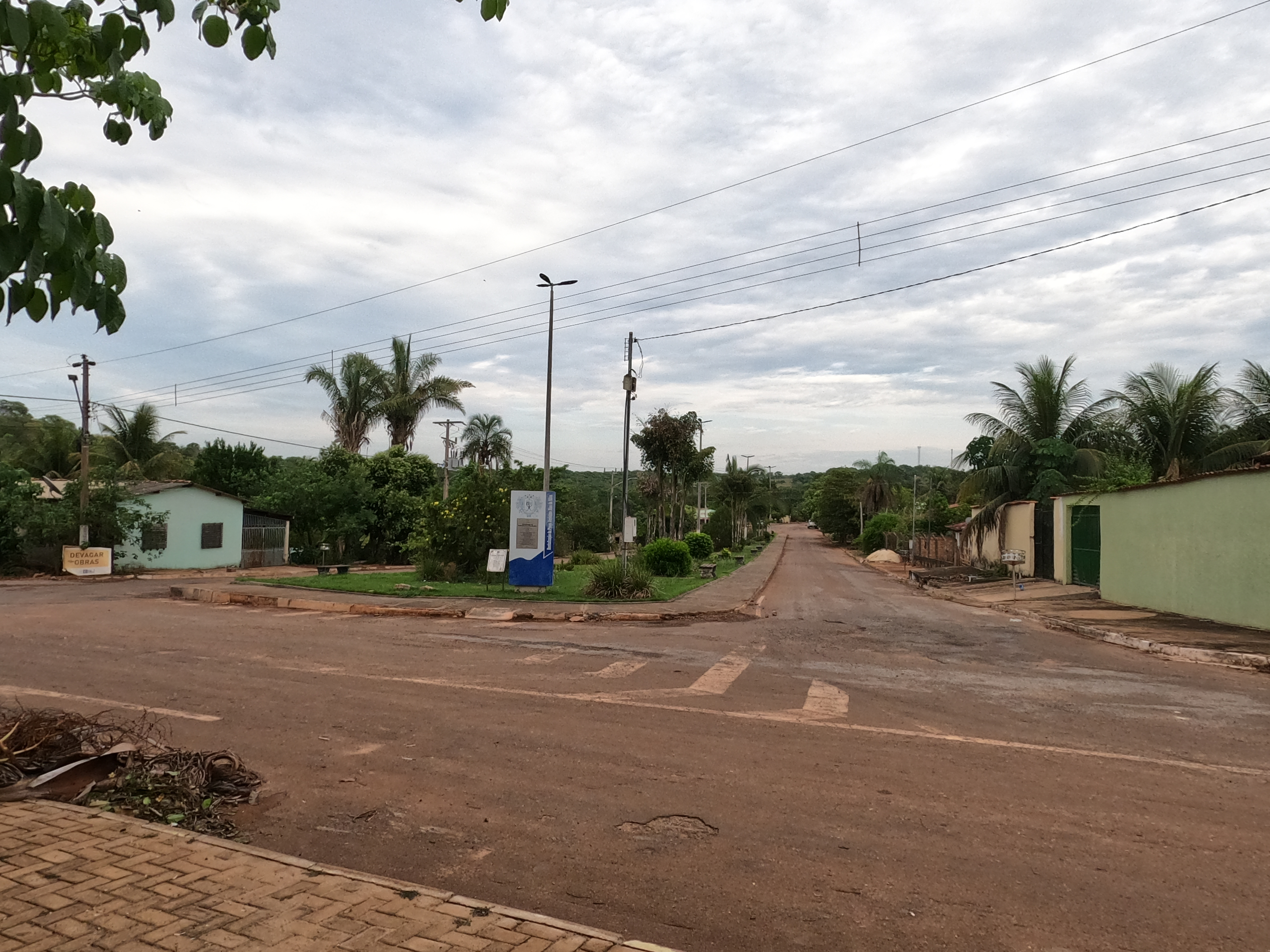

- Location of General Carneiro state
- Coordinates: 15°42′39″S 52°45′18″W
- Country: Brazil
- Region: Central-West
- State: Mato Grosso
- Founded: November 18, 1958

Government
  - Mayor: Juraci Rezende da Cunha (PT)

Area
  - Total: 3,721.078 km^{2} (1,436.716 sq mi)
- Elevation: 343 m (1,125 ft)

Population (2020)
  - Total: 5,592
  - Density: 0.3/km^{2} (0.78/sq mi)
- Time zone: UTC−3 (BRT)
- HDI (2000): 0.695 – medium

General Carneiro is a municipality in the Brazilian state of Mato Grosso. It has an area of 4,514.917 km^{2} and its population was estimated at 6037 inhabitants, according to IBGE data from 2022.
