= António de Mariz Carneiro =

17th century Portuguese cosmographer

António de Mariz Carneiro (15?? in Lisbon – 1669) was a Portuguese nobleman who served as the official cosmographer to the Portuguese crown.

== Biography ==
Mariz Carneiro was educated at the University of Osuna and the University of Coimbra, gaining a bachelor's degree in 1623. He came from the noble Mariz family, which had long been employed as judges and high officials at the Portuguese court.

In 1631, Carneiro was appointed as Royal Cosmographer by Philip III of Portugal. This post had previously been occupied by Pedro Nunes. Mariz Carneiro published several books and was the first to include precise drawings, with coastal hydrology.

Married first time with Angela de Menezes that died in 1642 in Porto, while he was nominated to be the judge of Porto court house. Married second time with his cousin Antonia Luisa de Menezes.

== Works ==
- Descrição da Fortaleza de Sofala e das mais da Índia (1639)
- Regimento de pilotos, e roteiro das navegaçoens da India Oriental : agora novamente emendado & acresentado co[m] o Roteiro da costa de Sofala, ate Mo[m]baça : & com os portos, & barras do Cabo de Finis taerra ate o Estreito de Gibaltar, com suas derrotas, sondas, & demonstraçoens (1642)
- Regimento de pilotos e roteiro da navegaçam, e conquistas do Brasil, Angola, S. Thome, Cabo Verde, Maranhão, Ilhas, & Indias Occidentais (5a. ed., 1655)
- Roteiro da India Oriental : com as emmendas que novamente se fizeraõ a elle : e acresentado com o Roteiro da costa de Sofala, atè Mombaça, & com os portos, & barras do Cabo de Finis terrae atè o Estreito de Gibaltar, com suas derrotas, & demonstraçoens (1666)

== See also ==
- Pedro Nunes
- Portuguese Empire
