= Biblical literalist chronology =

Religious concept

Biblical literalist chronology is the correlation of historical dates used in the Bible with the chronology of actual events, typically starting with creation in Genesis 1:1. Some of the better-known calculations include Archbishop James Ussher, who placed it in 4004 BC, Isaac Newton in 4000 BC (both from the Masoretic Hebrew Bible), Martin Luther in 3961 BC, the traditional Hebrew calendar date of 3760 BC, and lastly the dates based on the Septuagint, of roughly 5500 BC. The dates between the Septuagint and Masoretic are conflicting by 650 years between the genealogy of Arphaxad to Nahor in Genesis 11:12-24. The Masoretic Text, which lacks the 650 years of the Septuagint, is the text used by most modern Bibles. There is no consensus of which is right; however, without the additional 650 years in the Septuagint, according to Egyptologists the great Pyramids of Giza would pre-date the Flood (yet show no signs of water erosion) and provide no time for Tower of Babel event.

== Background ==
The Jewish Bible (the Christian Old Testament) dates events either by simple arithmetic taking the creation of the world as the starting point, or, in the later books, by correlations between the reigns of kings in Israel and Judah. The data it provides falls into three periods:

1. From the Creation to Abraham's migration to Canaan, during which events are dated by adding the ages of the patriarchs;
2. From Abraham's migration to the foundation of Solomon's Temple, in which the chronology in Genesis continues to be arrived at by adding ages, but from Exodus on is usually given in statements;
3. From the foundation of the temple onward, which gives the reigns in years (sometimes shorter periods) of kings in Israel and Judah.

Some believe that for the biblical authors the chronology was theological in intent, functioning as prophecy and not as history. Biblical literalism, however, does not treat it this way, because literalists have a profound respect for the Bible as the word of God. This way of thinking had its origins in Christian fundamentalism, an early-20th-century movement which opposed then-current non-supernatural interpretations of the life of Jesus by stressing, among other things, the verbal inspiration of scripture. The underlying concept or reasoning was that if anything in the Bible were not true, everything would collapse.

== Literalist chronologies ==
The creation of a literalist chronology of the Bible faces several hurdles, of which the following are the most significant:

- There are different texts of the Jewish Bible, the major text-families being: the Septuagint, a Greek translation of the original Hebrew scriptures made in the last few centuries before Christ; the Masoretic Text, a version of the Hebrew text curated by the Jewish rabbis but the earliest manuscripts of which date from the early years of the 2nd millennium CE; and the Samaritan Text, restricted to the five books of the Torah plus the Book of Joshua. The three differ quite markedly from each other.
- Literalists prefer the Masoretic Text, on which Protestant Bibles are based, but the Masoretic Text sometimes contains absurdities, as when it states that Saul came to the throne at the age of one and reigned for two years. Such obvious errors can be corrected by reference to other versions of the Bible (in this case the Septuagint, which gives more realistic numbers), but their existence calls into question the fundamentalist idea that the Masoretic Text is the inspired word of God. Most fundamentalists, with the notable exception of the King James Only movement, avoid this by holding that only the authors of the original autographs (the very first copies written by Moses and others) were inspired by God.
- Very few events in the Bible are mentioned in outside sources, making it difficult to move from a relative chronology (X happened before Y happened) to an absolute one (X happened in a known year).

== Tables ==
The Bible measures events from the year of God's creation of the world, a type of calendar called Anno Mundi ("Year of the World"), shortened as AM. The task of a literal biblical chronology is to convert this to dates in the modern chronology expressed as years before or after Christ, BC and AD. There have been many attempts to do this, none of them universally accepted. The following tables (derived from Thomas L. Thompson, The Mythic Past; notes within the table as cited) divide the Bible's AM dates by the three periods into which they most naturally fall.

=== Creation to Abraham's migration to Canaan ===
Masoretic Date (AM)	Event	Note
AM 1 AM 1656; AM 1946; AM 2021	Creation; Flood; Birth of Abraham; Entry into Canaan	From Creation to the birth of Abraham time is calculated by adding the ages of the Patriarchs when their first child is born. It seems possible that the period of the Flood is not meant to be included in the count – Shem, born 100 years before the Flood, "begot" his first son two years after it, which should make him 102, but Genesis 11:10–11 specifies that he is only 100, suggesting that time has been suspended. Rashi explains that Japheth was born 100 years before the flood, and Shem was born two years later, solving the discrepancy. A literal chronology would put the creation of the world about 4000 BC and the Flood about 2300 BC. The best-known attempt to provide a date for Creation is probably that of Archbishop James Ussher, who placed it 4004 BCE, but there are many alternatives, including Isaac Newton in 4000 BCE, Martin Luther in 3961 BCE, the traditional Jewish date of 3760 BCE, and the traditional Greek Orthodox date, based on the Septuagint, of 5509 BCE. The dates given to subsequent events such as the Flood will depend on this initial date.

=== Abraham's entry into Canaan to the foundation of Solomon's Temple ===
Masoretic Date (AM)	Event	Note
AM 2236; AM 2666; AM 3146	Entrance into Egypt; The Exodus; Foundation of Solomon's Temple	The 215 years between Abraham's call to enter Canaan (AM 2021) and Jacob's entry into Egypt (AM 2236) are calculated from the ages of Abraham, Isaac and Jacob provided in Genesis; the 430 year period in Egypt is stated in Exodus 12:40, although St. Paul in the New Testament says that the 430 years covers the entire period from Abraham to the exodus. The Exodus (AM 2666) occurs exactly two-thirds of the way through the 4,000 years from the Creation to the rededication of the Temple in 164 BCE, marking it as the pivotal event of the chronology. It is also two-thirds of the way through the 40 notional "generations" of 100 years each making up the 4,000 years, with Aaron, the first High Priest, being the 26th generation from Adam. A literal reading of the Biblical chronology would place the Exodus about 1446 BCE, on the basis of the statement in 1 Kings 6:1 that the Temple was founded 480 years after the Exodus. From this a literal chronology can deduce dates for the entry into Canaan 40 years later and the birth of Moses 80 years earlier. It seems impossible, however, to reconcile the 430 years in Egypt with the Bible's information (Exodus 12:40) that this involved only four generations.

=== After Solomon's Temple ===
Masoretic Date (AM)	Event	Note
AM 3146 to AM 3576; AM 3626; AM 4000	Foundation of the Temple (Kings of Israel and Judah); Siege of Jerusalem and destruction of the Temple; Re-foundation of the Second Temple; Re-dedication of the Temple	The period from the foundation of the Temple to its destruction, 430 years, is found by adding the reigns of the kings of Judah from the fourth year of Solomon (the year of the Temple's foundation). The fourth year of Solomon came exactly 1,200 years after the birth of Abraham (Abraham was born in AM 1946 if the two years of the Flood are excluded), and there were exactly 20 kings in both Judah and Israel following Solomon, despite Judah lasting more than a century longer than Israel. The complete chronology seems to point towards the re-dedication of the Temple by the Maccabees in 164 BCE bringing the chronology to AM 4000, from which the entire cycle is calculated backwards. The chronology of the monarchy, unlike that of earlier periods, can be checked against non-Biblical sources and seems to be correct in general terms. This raises the prospect that the Books of Kings can be used to reconstruct a chronology for the monarchy, but the task has in fact proven intractably difficult. The problem is that the books contain numerous contradictions: to take just one example, since Rehoboam of Judah and Jeroboam of Israel began to rule at the same time (1 Kings 12), and since Ahaziah of Judah and Joram of Israel were killed at the same time (1 Kings 9:24, 27), the same amount of time should have elapsed in both kingdoms, but the count shows 95 years passing in Judah and 98 in Israel. In short, "[t]he data concerning the synchronisms appeared in hopeless contradiction with the data as to the lengths of reigns." Possibly the most widely followed attempt to resolve the problems is Edwin R. Thiele's The Mysterious Numbers of the Hebrew Kings (three editions between 1951 and 1983), but his work has been widely criticised for, among other things, introducing "innumerable" co-regencies, constructing a "complex system of calendars", and using "unique" patterns of calculation; as a result his following is largely among scholars "committed ... to a doctrine of scripture's absolute harmony" (the criticism is to be found in Brevard Childs' Introduction to the Old Testament as Scripture). Subsequent scholars continue to propose alternative chronologies, but, in the words of a recent commentary on Kings, there is "little consensus on acceptable methods of dealing with conflicting data."

== Example of literalist chronology ==
The following tabulation of years and dates is according to the literal letter of the text of the Bible alone. Links to multiple translations and versions are provided for verification. For comparison, known historically dated events are associated with the resultant literal dates. Dates according to the famous Ussher chronology appear in small type italics "A.M." (Latin: "Year of the World"), "Ante C." (Latin: "Before Christ"). In ancient Israel a part year was designated as the previous king's last year and the new king's 1st year. The arithmetic can be checked by starting at the bottom of the table with the date of the destruction of the Temple in 587 and adding the number of years in the Scriptures (books of the Prophets and Chronicles through Genesis) back up to the beginning. Dates with events in italics appearing in small type for historical comparison are according to Bernard Grun's The Timetables of History. For the period after 587 BCE known historical dates are used as referents. Biblical source texts for stated numbers of years are referenced and linked. Reference sources are the RSVCE, The New American Bible The Timetables of History by Bernard Grun, and the Holman Illustrated Bible Dictionary (2003).

This table is not definitive. It is a column of known numbers in the Bible sequentially added together. It is not a Biblical harmony. It is not the result of any kind of research and is not here presented as research. The details and dates of events in tables derived by the method of mechanical arithmetic tabulation from the text of the Bible alone are not relied upon by scholars and historians as representing established historical facts. (Note: As with the literalist reckoning of the Ussher Chronology, the dates associated with the literalist reckoning of the Seder 'Olam Rabbah (A.M.) should not be relied upon as fact. —Source: Jenkins, Everett, (The Creation: secular, Jewish, Catholic, Protestant, and Muslim perspectives: The Seder Olam Chronology, p. 330)) See Prooftext. Problems are briefly noted. This table is an illustrative demonstration only. It is not a recognized reliable resource for a Bible Quiz or a paper.

=== Adam to the Flood 4246–2590 BC ===
Before Christ (BC)	Event	Bible texts
4246; Ante C. 4004	The year Adam was formed."4246 BC." Reckoning the years (beginning with the Exodus from Egypt as 1577 BC) in Egypt 430 years, Israel/Jacob (before 17 years in Egypt) 130 years, Isaac 60, Abraham 100, Terah 70, Nahor 29, Serug 30, Reu 32, Peleg 30, Eber 34, Shelah 30, Arpachshad 35, Shem 100 (2 years after the flood), Noah 503 (601 years old when the flood ended and Shem was 98 – he was 503 years old when Shem was born – 503 years), Lamech 182, Methuselah 187, Enoch 65, Jared 162, Mahalalel 65, Kenan 70, Enosh 90, Seth 105, Adam 130 = 2669 years back to 4246 BC (1577–4246). He lived 930 years (4246–3316).: Ubaid period in Northern Mesopotamia 5300–4300 BC.; Ubaid 3 from 4500–4000 BC. see Neolithic, Bronze Age and Chalcolithic	Genesis 2:7; Genesis 5:5
4116; Ante C. 3874	The year Seth was born.: Adam was 130 years old.	Genesis 5:3
4011; Ante C. 3769	The year Enosh was born.: Seth was 105, Adam 235 years old.	Genesis 5:6
3921	The year Kenan was born.: Enosh was 90, Seth 195, Adam 325 years old.	Genesis 5:9
3851	The year Mahalalel was born.: Kenan was 70, Enosh 160, Seth 265, Adam 395 years old.	Genesis 5:12
3786	The year Jared was born.: Mahalalel was 65, Kenan 135, Enosh 225, Seth 330, Adam 460 years old.	Genesis 5:15
3624	The year Enoch was born.: Jared was 162, Mahalalel 227, Kenan 297, Enosh 387, Seth 492, Adam 622 years old.	Genesis 5:18
3559	The year Methuselah was born.: Enoch was 65, Jared 227, Mahalalel 292, Kenan 362, Enosh 452, Seth 557, Adam 687 years old.; Disastrous floods in Mesopotamian region near end of –4000 to –3501 period.	Genesis 5:21
3372	The year Lamech was born.: Methuselah was 187, Enoch 252, Jared 414, Mahalalel 479, Kenan 549, Enosh 639, Seth 744, Adam 874 years old.	Genesis 5:25
3316	The year Adam died. He was 930 years old (4246–3316).: Lamech was 56, Methuselah 243, Enoch 308, Jared 470, Mahalalel 535, Kenan 605, Enosh 695, Seth 800 years old.; Testament of Adam. See Pseudepigrapha.	Genesis 5:5
3259; Ante C. 3017	The year Enoch was taken by God. He was 365 years old (3624–3259).: Lamech was 113, Methuselah 300, Jared 527, Mahalalel 592, Kenan 662, Enosh 752, Seth 857 years old.; See Book of Enoch and Second Book of Enoch	Genesis 5:23–24
3204	The year Seth died. He was 912 years old (4116–3204).: Lamech was 168, Methuselah 355, Jared 582, Mahalalel 647, Kenan 717, Enosh 807 years old.	Genesis 5:8
3190; Ante C. 2948	The year Noah was born.: Lamech was 182, Methuselah 369, Jared 596, Mahalalel 661, Kenan 731, Enosh 821 years old.	Genesis 5:28–29
3106	The year Enosh died. He was 905 years old (4011–3106).: Noah was 84, Lamech 266, Methuselah 453, Jared 680, Mahalalel 745, Kenan 815 years old.	Genesis 5:11
3011	The year Kenan died. He was 910 years old (3921–3011).: Noah was 179, Lamech 361, Methuselah 548, Jared 775, Mahalalel 840 years old.	Genesis 5:14
2956	The year Mahalalel died. He was 895 years old (3851–2956).: Noah was 234, Lamech 416, Methuselah 603, Jared 803 years old.	Genesis 5:17
2824	The year Jared died. He was 962 years old (3786–2824).: Noah was 366, Lamech 548, Methuselah 735 years old.; See Second Dynasty of Egypt c. 2890–2686 BC Gilgamesh, legendary king of Uruk (Erech) (c. –2750)	Genesis 5:20
2690	Noah was 500 years old.: Lamech was 682, Methuselah 872 years old.; See Sumer Sumer: Early Dynastic Period Old Kingdom of Egypt beginning 2700–2200 BC or 2686–2181 BC See Mastaba	Genesis 5:32
2687	The year Shem was born. He was 100 years old 2 years after the Flood, when Noah was 603.: Noah was 503, Lamech 685, Methuselah 875 years old.; See Third Dynasty of Egypt 2686–2613 BC Pharaoh Djoser reigned 19 or 28 years c. 2670 BC Pyramid of Djoser 2630–2611 BC	Genesis 7:11; Genesis 8:13; Genesis 11:10
2595	The year Lamech died. He was 777 years old (3372–2595).: Shem was 92, Noah 595, Methuselah 964 years old.	Genesis 5:31
2590; Ante C. 2348	The year Methuselah died. He was 969 years old (3559–2590).: The Flood began.; Shem was 97, Noah 600 years old.; See Fourth Dynasty of Egypt Pharaoh Khufu (reigned c. 2589–2566 BC)	Genesis 5:27; Genesis 7:11

=== The Flood to Abram 2589–2211 BC ===
Before Christ (BC)	Event	Bible texts
2589	The Flood waters dried up, and the ark came to rest on the Mountains of Ararat.: Shem was 98, Noah 601 years old.	Genesis 8:4; Genesis 8:13
2587; Ante C. 2204	The year Arpachshad was born, 2 years after the Flood.: Shem was 100, Noah 603 years old.; The Great Pyramid of Giza (Khufu), built over a period of 20 years c. 2580–2560 BCE	Genesis 11:10
2552	The year Shelah was born.: Arpachshad was 35, Shem 135, Noah 638 years old.	Genesis 11:12
2522	The year Eber was born.: Shelah was 30, Arpachshad 65, Shem 165, Noah 668 years old.; Mis-anni-padda, king of Ur, first recorded ruler in Mesopotamia.	Genesis 11:14
2488	The year Peleg was born. "...in his days the earth was divided.": Eber was 34, Shelah 64, Arpachshad 99, Shem 199, Noah 702 years old.; See Tower of Babel and Nimrod.; Settlement of Aramean nomads from Euphrates area and of Semitic Canaanite tribes in Palestine. –2500 to –2001.	Genesis 10:25; Genesis 11:9
2458	The year Reu was born.: Peleg was 30, Eber 64, Shelah 94, Arpachshad 129, Shem 229, Noah 732 years old.	Genesis 11:18
2426	The year Serug was born.: Reu was 32, Peleg 62, Eber 96, Shelah 126, Arpachshad 161, Shem 261, Noah 764 years old.	Genesis 11:20
2396	The year Nahor was born.: Serug was 30, Reu 62, Peleg 92, Eber 126, Shelah 156, Arpachshad 191, Shem 291, Noah 794 years old.; Lugalzaggisi, king of Uruk, defeats the Lagash empire and becomes "King of the Countries" (–2400 to –2350).; Puzur-Suen king of Sumer reigned 25 years c. 24th–23rd century BCE	Genesis 11:22
2367	The year Terah was born.: Nahor was 29, Serug 59, Reu 91, Peleg 121, Eber 155, Shelah 185, Arpachshad 220, Shem 320, Noah 823 years old.; Sargon, first king of Akkadian dynasty, defeats Lugalzaggisi, and creates a vast Semitic empire in Mesopotamia, and calls himself "King of the Four Quarters" (–2350 to –2100).	Genesis 11:24
2297	The year Abram was born.: Terah was 70, Nahor 99, Serug 129, Reu 161, Peleg 191, Eber 225, Shelah 255, Arpachshad 290, Shem 390, Noah 893 years old.	Genesis 11:26; Genesis 11:32; Acts 7:4
2287	The year Sarai was born, half-sister of Abram.: Abram was 10, Terah 80, Nahor 109, Serug 139, Reu 171, Peleg 201, Eber 235, Shelah 265, Arpachshad 300, Shem 400, Noah 903 years old.; Sargon of Akkad reigned c. 2334–2279 BCE Pharaoh Pepi I Meryre c. 2332–2283 BCE; Naramsin, ruler of Babylon (-2270 to -2205).	Genesis 17:17; Genesis 20:12–13
2249	The year Peleg died. He was 239 years old (30 + 209) (2488–2249).: Sarai was 38, Abram 48, Terah 118, Nahor 147, Serug 177, Reu 209, Eber 273, Shelah 303, Arpachshad 338, Shem 438, Noah 941 years old.; Ur, Kush, and Uruk	Genesis 11:18–19
2248	The year Nahor died. He was 148 years old (29 + 119) (2396–2248).: Sarai was 39, Abram 49, Terah 119, Serug 178, Reu 210, Eber 274, Shelah 304, Arpachshad 339, Shem 439, Noah 942 years old.	Genesis 11:24–25
2240	The year Noah died. He was 950 years old (3190–2240 BCE).: Sarai was 47, Abram 57, Terah 127, Serug 186, Reu 218, Eber 282, Shelah 312, Arpachshad 347, Shem 447.	Genesis 9:29
2222; Ante C. 1921	The year Abram departed from Haran. He was 75 years old (2297–2222).: Sarai was 65, Terah 145, Serug 204, Reu 236, Eber 300, Shelah 330, Arpachshad 365, Shem 465 years old.	Genesis 12:4
2219	The year Reu died. He was 239 years old (32 + 207) (2458–2219).: Abram was 78, Terah 148, Serug 207, Eber 303, Shelah 333, Arpachshad 368, Shem 468 years old.	Genesis 11:20–21
c. 2219–2211; Ante C. 1912	"And in the 14th year..." The Battle of the kings in the Valley of Siddim.: Abram defeated Chedorlaomer and rescued Lot.; Melchizedek king of Salem brought forth bread and wine and blessed Abram by God Most High. Genesis 14:19.	Genesis 14:1–20
2212–2211; Ante C. 1911	"After Abram had dwelt ten years in the land of Canaan..." (2221–2211); Sarai gave her handmaid Hagar to Abram as a wife.: 2211. The year Ishmael was born to Abram and Hagar, Sarai's handmaid.; Sarai was 76, Abram 86, Terah 156, Serug 215, Eber 311, Shelah 341, Arpachshad 376, Shem 476 years old.; Hyksos "Shepherd Kings" rule in Egypt began (-2200 to –1700 BCE).	Genesis 16:3–16

=== Abraham to Joseph 2198–1936 BC ===
Before Christ (BC)	Event	Bible texts
2198; Ante C. 1897	The Covenant of circumcision.: Ishmael was 13, Sarai/Sarah 89, Abram/Abraham 99, Terah 169, Serug 228, Eber 324, Shelah 354, Arpachshad 389, Shem 489 years old.; Brimstone and fire rained down on Sodom and Gomorrah. See Zoara, Meteor shower, Impact event, Firestorm	Genesis 17:1–19:29
2197; Ante C. 1896	The year Isaac was born.: Ishmael was 14, Sarah 90, Abraham 100, Terah 170, Serug 229, Eber 325, Shelah 355, Arpachshad 390, Shem 490 years old.	Genesis 21:5
2196	The year Serug died. He was 230 years old (2426–2196).: Isaac was 1 year old, Ishmael 15, Sarah 91, Abraham 101, Terah 171, Eber 326, Shelah 356, Arpachshad 391, Shem 491 years old.	Genesis 11:22–23
c. 2195–2192; Ante C. 1891	Isaac was weaned about 2–5 years old. Abraham made a great feast.: The next morning Hagar and Ishmael were cast out.; Ishmael was 17–20 years old, a "child". Genesis 21:14. (Note: The King James Version of Genesis 21:14 translates ילד yeled as "child". According to Strong's Concordance of the Bible Hebrew and Chaldee Dictionary of the Old Testament (Strong's number 3206) this word also means "young man".)	Genesis 16:16; Genesis 21:8–14
no date A.M. 2135, Ante C. 1869	The binding of Isaac.: The testing of Abraham. "...now I know that you fear God, seeing you have not withheld your son, your only son, from me."; Isaac was between the ages of 12 and 20 years, a "lad" (KJV, RSV), a "boy" (NRSV, REB, NAB, NJB), a youth. (Note: "lad": According to Strong's Concordance of the Bible, Hebrew and Chaldee Dictionary of the Old Testament, number 5288. נער na'ar, a boy (as active) from the age of infancy to adolescence; by implication, a servant: – babe, boy, child, lad, servant, young (man). The same term is also applied (by interchange of gender) to a girl, a damsel, of similar latitude in age. Ishmael 17–20 years old by the reckoning in this table was also נער na'ar (Genesis 21:17–20), a "lad", a "boy", young (man), youth, when he and his mother Hagar were cast out after Isaac was weaned.) He was old enough and strong enough to carry on his shoulders the wood for the burnt offering.	Genesis 22:1–19
2162	The year Terah died in Haran. He was 205 years old (2367–2162).: Isaac was 35, Ishmael 49, Sarah 125, Abraham 135, Eber 320, Shelah 390, Arpachshad 425, Shem 525 years old.	Genesis 11:32
2160; Ante C. 1859	The year Sarah died at Hebron. She was 127 years old (2287–2160). Abraham bought the field and the cave in Machpelah. The first possession of the promised land in Palestine.: Isaac was 37, Ishmael 51, Abraham 137, Eber 322, Shelah 392, Arpachshad 427, Shem 527 years old.	Genesis 23:1; Genesis 23:10–20
2149	The year Arpachshad died. He was 438 years old (35 + 403) (2587–2149).: Isaac was 48, Ishmael 62, Sarah 138, Abraham 148, Eber 373, Shelah 403, Shem 538 years old.	Genesis 11:12–13
2137; Ante C. 1836	The year Esau and Jacob were born.: Isaac was 60, Ishmael 74, Sarah 150, Abraham 160, Eber 385, Shelah 415, Shem 550 years old.; See Eleventh Dynasty of Egypt Mentuhotep I reigned at Thebes c. 2135 BCE	Genesis 25:24–26
2122; Ante C. 1821	The year Abraham died. He was 175 years old (2297–2122).: Esau and Jacob were 15, Isaac 75, Ishmael 89, Eber 400, Shelah 430, Shem 565 years old.; Intef I reigned 4–16 years c. 2120 BCE	Genesis 25:7–8
2119	The year Shelah died. He was 433 years old (30 + 403) (2552–2119).: Esau and Jacob were 18, Isaac 78, Ishmael 92, Eber 403, Shem 568 years old.; Intef II reigned almost 50 years 2112–2063 BCE	Genesis 11:14–15
c. 2100	Abraham leaves Ur in Chaldea (c. -2100)	Genesis 11:31
2087	The year Shem died. He was 600 years old (2687–2087).: Esau and Jacob were 50, Isaac 110, Ishmael 124, Eber 435 years old.	Genesis 11:10–11
2074	The year Ishmael died. He was 137 years old (2211–2074).: Esau and Jacob were 63, Isaac 123, Eber 448 years old.	Genesis 25:17
2060; Ante C. 1759	Jacob was sent away to Paddan-aram to take a wife from the daughters of Laban.: Jacob was 77, Esau 77, Isaac 137, Eber 462 years old.; Jacob began to serve Laban 7 years for Rachel (2060–2053).	Genesis 28:2–5; Genesis 29:20
2058	The year Eber died. He was 464 years old (34 + 430) (2522–2058).: Jacob was 79, Esau 79, Isaac 139 years old.	Genesis 11:16–17
2053; Ante C. 1752	The year Jacob completed 7 years of service to Laban for Rachel (2060–2053). He was given Leah instead.: Rachel was given to Jacob in return for another 7 years of service (2053–2046).; Jacob was 84, Esau 84, Isaac 144 years old.	Genesis 29:21–30
c. 2051–2050	The approximate time when Levi was born (about 30–33 months after Jacob married Leah).: Beginning of the Middle Kingdom of Egypt (2050–1650 BCE)	Genesis 29:31–34; Wisdom 7:1–6
2046; Ante C. 1746	The year Joseph was born.: Jacob began to serve Laban another 6 years for his flocks (2046–2040).; Jacob was 91, Esau 91, Isaac 151 years old.	Genesis 30:22–34; Genesis 31:41
2040; Ante C. 1739	God commanded Jacob to return to the land of his fathers and to his kindred.: Jacob was named "Israel".; Joseph was 6, Jacob/Israel 97, Esau 97, Isaac 157 years old.	Genesis 31:3–55; Genesis 32–33
2029; Ante C. 1728	The year Joseph was 17 years old, a mere lad, a boy, he was sold, and taken into Egypt.: Jacob/Israel was 108, Isaac 168 years old.	Genesis 37:2–28
2018; Ante C. 1717	11 years had passed. Joseph was 28 years old.: In prison he interpreted the dreams of Pharaoh's chief butler and chief baker.; The chief butler forgot Joseph for 2 whole years (2018–2016).	Genesis 40:1–41:1
2017	The year Isaac died. He was 180 years old (2197–2017).: Joseph was 29, Jacob 120 years old.	Genesis 35:28–29
2016; Ante C. 1715	Joseph was 30 years old when he was brought out of prison and interpreted Pharaoh's dreams. He entered Pharaoh's service, was placed over the whole land of Egypt, and was married to Asenath.: The 7 years of plenty began (2016–2009).; Jacob/Israel was 121 years old.; See Mentuhotep II (reigned 2061–2010 BCE)	Genesis 41:25–32; Genesis 41:46–49
c. 2010	Manasseh and Ephraim were born before the year of famine came.: Joseph was 36, Israel 127 years old.	Genesis 41:50–52
2009; Ante C. 1708	The 7 years of famine began.: Joseph was 37, Israel 128 years old.	Genesis 41:53–54
2007; Ante C. 1706	The year Israel entered Egypt.: Joseph settled his father and his brothers in Egypt, "and gave them a possession in the land of Egypt, in the best of the land, in the land of Rameses", also called Avaris, and Qantir. (Note: Ra-amses/Rameses was the site of the new Hyksos capital (1638–1530 BCE) called Avaris before they were driven out by the Theban pharaoh Ahmose I, the first pharaoh of the Eighteenth Dynasty, who then established a fortress and settlement on this site. Ahmose I's successors, down to Thutmose III, built and used a large royal compound just south of this site, which was in use until the reign of Amenhotep II. However, Pharaoh Raamses II/Ramesses II also built near this site. Source: "Pithom and Rameses", Holman Illustrated Bible Dictionary, p. 1301.) See Land of Goshen.; Joseph was 39, Israel 130 years old.; 5 more years of famine remained (2007–2002).; Israel and his sons, families and servants, dwelt in Egypt 17 years (2007–1990).; The people of Israel dwelt in the land of Egypt a total of 430 years (2007–1577).	Genesis 46:1–5; Genesis 46:29–31; Genesis 47:9–11; Genesis 47:28; Exodus 12:40
1990; Ante C. 1689	The year Israel died. He was 147 years old (2137–1990).: Joseph was 55 years old (2045–1990).	Genesis 47:28
1977	30 years after Israel entered Egypt, the Egyptians began to enslave the Israelites. Abraham's "posterity would be aliens in a land belonging to others, who would enslave them and ill-treat them 400 years" (1977–1577 BCE).: Joseph was 69 years old (2046–1977). He lived another 41 years.; Ephraim and Manasseh were about 39, Levi about 74 years old.; See Amenemhat I (reigned 1991–1962 BCE); also Senusret I (coregency 1971–1962, reigned 1971–1926 BCE)	Genesis 15:13–16; Acts 7:6–7
1936; Ante C. 1635	The year Joseph died. He was 110 years old (2046–1936).: See Testaments of the Twelve Patriarchs; The beginning of the peak period of Hyksos rule in Egypt (500 years –2200 to –1700 BCE).	Genesis 50:26

=== Egypt to the Exodus 1914–1577 BCE ===
Before the Common Era (BCE)	Event	Bible texts
c. 1914	The approximate year that Levi died. He was 137 years old (c. 2051–1914).	Exodus 6:16
18th century c. 1848–1686	Hammurabi, king of Babylonia, reunited the kingdom (18th century BCE). Hammurabi began reign in 1848, 1792, or 1736 BCE – he reigned 1792 BCE to 1750 BCE according to the middle chronology, 1728 BCE to 1686 BCE according to the short chronology.: Amraphel cannot be equated with Hammurabi or any other king of whom records are available from the ancient Near East.; The Code of Hammurabi c. 1750, has much in common with the other cuneiform collections of Ur-Nammu (21st century BCE), Lipit-Ishtar (19th century BCE), the kingdom of Eshnunna (c. 1800 BCE), the Hittite laws (16th or 15th century BCE), the Middle Assyrian laws (15th or 14th century BCE), and the Neo-Babylonian laws (7th century).; Egypt prospered under the pharaohs of the Twelfth Dynasty and conducted extensive trade with all the nations of the Near East.; Merneferre Ay, 1700–1677 BCE, reigned 23 years, 18 months, and 18 days.; Salitis ?–1674 BCE; Yaqub-Har reigned during the 17th or 16th century BCE, during Egypt's fragmented Second Intermediate Period.; See List of Thirteenth Dynasty pharaohs Fourteenth Dynasty	Genesis 14:1–16; Acts 7:22
1660	The year Aaron was born. Miriam's age is not given.: See Apepi/Apophis and Khamudi List of pharaohs of the Fourteenth Dynasty	Exodus 7:7; Numbers 20:1; Numbers 33:39
c. 1659	The cities of Pithom and Ra-amses/Rameses were built (c. 1659–1638).	Exodus 1:8–11
c. 1659–1657; Ante C. 1571	Pharaoh decreed that every son born to the Hebrews be thrown into the Nile.: Apepi (reigned 35–40 years 1675–1640 BCE); Wazad; Sekheperenre (reigned 2 mo./2 yrs between 1690 and 1649 BCE) See List of pharaohs and Chronology of the Second Intermediate Period The current state of Egyptian chronology cannot identify with certainty the sequence, and the length and years, of reigns of pharaohs of the Second Intermediate Period.	Exodus 1:22
1657; Ante C. 1571	Moses was born, and hidden 3 months. —interval between death of Joseph 1936 BCE and birth of Moses 1657 BCE = 279 years literal count. (1936 – 1657 = 279 years.): Aaron was 3 years old and was not affected by Pharaoh's decree. It is possible, by no means certain, that Miriam was older than her brother Aaron. Compare Exodus 2:4–8.; Apepi and Khamudi – to c. 1648 BCE (?) See Salitis, reign began around 1648 BCE Sakir-Har Second Intermediate Period of Egypt Fifteenth Dynasty of Egypt	Exodus 2:1–9; Exodus 7:7; Numbers 20:1; Deuteronomy 34:7
1617; Ante C. 1531	Moses was 40 years old (1657–1617) when he killed the Egyptian. Pharaoh sought to kill him, and Moses fled.: Aaron was 43 years old.; Moses stayed in the land of Midian 40 years (1617–1577).; reigning pharaohs (uncertain) 1650–1550 BCE: Khyan (?) Apepi I (?) Apepi II (?) The current state of Egyptian chronology cannot identify with certainty the sequence, and the length and years, of reigns of pharaohs of the Second Intermediate Period.	Exodus 2:11–15; Acts 7:23–30
1615	The year Joshua was born (if like Caleb he was 40 years old when he was sent forth as a leader with the spies from the wilderness of Paran to spy out the land 2 years after the Exodus).: Moses was 42, Aaron 45 years old.; See Khyan 1600–1580 BCE Rahotep c. 1585 BCE	Exodus 7:7; Numbers 13:2–16; Deuteronomy 2:14; Joshua 14:6–13; Joshua 24:29
1577; Ante C. 1491	Moses was 80 years old (1657–1577) when he was sent back to Egypt. Aaron was 83 years old.: The Ten Plagues and the Passover.; 1577. The Exodus – "And at the end of 430 years...all the hosts of the LORD went out from the land of Egypt." Exodus 12:40. 1577 BCE is the resultant date of the Exodus according to the literal counting of 559 years before Solomon laid the foundation of the Temple in the 4th year of his reign (in 1018 BCE by literal reckoning 1018 + 559 = 1577). (The age of Miriam is not given, Exodus 2:1–4, Numbers 20:1); Beginning with the destruction of the temple in Jerusalem in 587 BCE, and mechanically counting backward all the numbers of years stated in all the Bible texts Exodus through Chronicles (provided by links to Bible texts in the right-hand margin), gives the resultant dates shown in the left-hand margin of this table. The resulting tabulated total count of 990 years before the destruction of the temple in 587 BCE, a date tabulated as 559 years before Solomon's 4th year here tabulated as 1018 BCE when he laid the foundation of the temple, gives 1577 BCE as a literalist date for the Exodus from Egypt. However, literalists' reckonings of the dates still disagree with each other, even with all of the numbers of the years given in the texts.: Joshua was 38 (?), Moses 80, Aaron 83 years old. *See Sobekemsaf and Sobekemsaf II c. 1570s BCE Seventeenth Dynasty of Egypt 1580–1550 BCE Turin King list; The liberation of Egypt from Hyksos rule by Amosis I in 1575 BCE marked the beginning of the New Kingdom –1575 to –1200.; See Minoan eruption and Tempest Stele.	Exodus 7:7–12:51

=== The Wilderness Period to the Conquest of Canaan 1576–1505 BC ===
Before Christ (BC)	Event	Bible texts
1576; Ante C. 1490	The Tabernacle was erected 1 year after the people of Israel came out of the land of Egypt, in the first month, on the first day, at the beginning of the second year.: Joshua was 39 (?), Moses 81, Aaron 84 years old.; According to Exodus 33:11, Joshua was a "young man", not yet 20 years old.	Exodus 33:11; Exodus 40:17; Numbers 9:1–5
1575	Moses sent out Hoshea/Joshua the son of Nun and 11 other leaders in Israel from the wilderness of Paran to spy out the land of Canaan. Caleb was 40 years old. At their report the congregation cried out, and God decreed the people would wander in the wilderness 40 years.: Joshua was 40 (?), Moses 82, Aaron 85 years old.; Joshua 14:7 plainly says that Caleb and the brethren who went up with him to spy out the land were sent from Kadesh-barnea, not the wilderness of Paran. Deuteronomy 2:14 plainly says that the time from their leaving Kadesh-barnea until the entire generation, the men of war, had perished was 38 years, "as the LORD had sworn to them." (1575–1537); See Eighteenth Dynasty of Egypt Seqenenre Tao reign began 1560/1558 BCE Kamose c. 1555–1550 BCE Amenhotep I 1555–1530 BCE	Numbers 12:16–13:3; Numbers 13:25–14:37; Numbers 20:1; Deuteronomy 2:14–15; Joshua 14:6–7
c. 1538/7	Miriam died (age not given) 1537 (?) – see the interval of time in Numbers between the death of Miriam and the death of her brother Aaron. Numbers 20:1–33:38.	Numbers 20:1; Numbers 33:38
1537; Ante C. 1452	The 40th year after the people of Israel had come out of Egypt (1577–1537). Aaron died. He was 123 years old (1660–1537). Moses also died. He was 120 years old (1657–1537).: Joshua was 78 (?) years old (40 + 38) (if he like Caleb was 40 years old when he was sent forth with the spies from the wilderness of Paran to spy out the land.); See Apocalypse of Moses and Assumption of Moses	Numbers 20:1; Numbers 33:38–39; Deuteronomy 34:7; Joshua 14:6–7; Psalms 90
1537–1505 —→Ante C. 1434	The conquest of Canaan, a period of 32 (?) years, beginning with Jericho (1536). The Bible does not state the number of the years of the conquest of Canaan during the lifetime of Joshua, only that Joshua was 110 years old when he died.: See Ai and Hazor John Garstang and Kathleen Kenyon (Note: According to carbon-dating, Jericho (Jericho City IV) was destroyed between 1617 and 1530 BCE. The site remained uninhabited (Joshua's curse ? 6:26) until the city was refounded in the 9th century BCE. John Garstang determined that Jericho was destroyed by fire around 1400 BCE, corresponding to the biblical dating of the Israelite conquest current at that time. Kathleen Kenyon's findings disagreed with Garstang and the accepted biblical dating, and she dated the destruction and the city wall to a much earlier time, in the 1600–1500s, c. 1550. But she believed that the Exodus and the conquest under Joshua took place in the 1200s and declared that, since the city had already been long uninhabited through the entire 13th century, it was impossible that Jericho had been destroyed by Joshua according to the biblical account. "While critical scholars underline the conflict between archaeological data and the biblical conquest narrative, in reality there is no conflict here."—Karen Joines and Eric Mitchell. —Source: "Jericho", Karen Joines and Eric Mitchell, Holman Illustrated Bible Dictionary, pp. 885–88. Israeli-Canadian journalist Simcha Jacobovici (The Exodus Decoded, 2006) pointed out that if researchers of the future insisted that the American Civil War took place at the time of the Civil Rights Movement in the United States in the 1960s at the time of the Vietnam War, and then looked for evidence supporting occurrence of the Civil War at that time, they would find none, and the presidency of Abraham Lincoln would be regarded as only legendary. If chronological dating provided by a more literal reading of the Tanakh were taken seriously, then concrete archaeological evidence for the historical accuracy of the biblical text would become more evident: "It's staring them in the face, and they don't recognize it."); See Mesopotamian dynasties: mid-second millennium	Deuteronomy 2:14; Joshua 6:2; Joshua 6:20–21; Joshua 6:26; Joshua 8:21–29; Joshua 11:10–22; Joshua 14:7–10
1505; Ante C. 1434	The year Joshua died. He was 110 years old (1615–1505). "...Israel served the LORD all the days of Joshua, and all the days of the elders who outlived Joshua..." (Joshua 24:30–31).: Joshua added statutes and ordinances to the Book of the Law. Joshua 24:25–26. See Deuteronomy 34:1–9. (Note: The account of Moses' death in the Book of Deuteronomy, among other texts in the Torah, suggests that Moses did not write the whole of what is contained in the Five Books of Moses. —Source: "Deuteronomy, book of", Daniel I. Block, Holman Illustrated Bible Dictionary, pp. 415–19 [417a].); A plain, explicit number representing the remaining days of life of the elders who outlived Joshua cannot be drawn from the text of the Bible; the Bible does not tell the period of time elapsed between the burial of Joshua and the day when "all that generation also were gathered to their fathers." Judges 2:10.	Deuteronomy 34:1–9; Joshua 14:7–10; Joshua 24:25–26; Joshua 24:29–30

=== The Judges to the United Monarchy 1505–1018 BCE ===
Before the Common Era (BCE)	Event	Bible texts
1505	"...the people served the LORD...all the days of the elders who outlived Joshua...and there arose a generation after them, who did not know the LORD....": A plain, explicit meaning for the exact period of "the days of the elders" and of the "generation after them" cannot be drawn from the text of the Bible alone; the Bible text does not explicitly state the number of days of that generation. The "300 years" of Judges 11:26 is not useful here in determining the period of that generation and does not correspond to the literal numbering of the years stated plainly in all the chronological texts of the Bible tabulated from David back to Joshua, from 2 Samuel through Joshua (Jephthah 1186 BCE back to Cushan-Rishathaim 1505 BCE: 1505–1186 BCE = 319 years). The "450 years" of Acts 13:19–20 for the period of the judges exactly corresponds to the literal tabulation of the years in this table, from 1505 BCE, after Joshua, to 1055 BCE, when David began to rule over all Israel and Judah (1505 – 1055 = 450), but it does not correspond to the literal tabulation of the years of the "judges until Samuel the prophet" 1115/1075 BCE. (1505–1115 BCE = 390 years, and 1505–1075 BCE = 430 years.) This text too is not useful in determining the number of days and length of years of the 2 generations after Joshua.; "...whenever the judge died, they turned back and behaved worse than their fathers..." (Judges 2:18–19)	Judges 2:7; Judges 2:10; Judges 2:18–19; Judges 11:26; Acts 13:19–20 "about 450 years" to c. 1055 BCE (1505 – 450 = 1055)
1505–1497	Israel served Cushan-Rishathaim king of Mesopotamia 8 years.: See Kassites and Aram-Naharaim; 1498. The Exodus – "And at the end of 430 years...all the hosts of the LORD went out from the land of Egypt." 1498 BCE is the resultant date of the Exodus according to the literal counting of 480 years (1 Kings 6:1) before Solomon laid the foundation of the Temple in the 4th year of his reign (1018 BCE by literal reckoning 1018 + 480 = 1498 BCE). (Note: "1498. The Exodus." See The Exodus Decoded: Simcha Jacobovici's arguments. Simcha Jacobovici coincidentally argues for a similar literalist date of c. 1500 BCE without directly adverting to the arithmetically derived textually based chronological date used in this table. His use of extra-biblical archæologically dated evidence in support of his arguments for a 16th/15th century date for the Exodus has been criticised and rejected by a majority of mainstream researchers (critical sources cited in article The Exodus Decoded#References).); See Thutmose I, Thutmose II, Hatshepsut pharaohs of Egypt about this time.	Judges 3:8
1497–1457	Othniel, son of Kenaz the younger brother of Caleb, judged Israel.: The land had rest for 40 years 1497–1457, then Othniel died. Judges 3:9–11.; The ages of Othniel and Kenaz are not given in the Bible.; 1486. Moses and Joshua defeat Sihon king of the Amorites. (Jephthah in the Book of Judges calls them "Ammonites".) See Judges 11:4–28 and Numbers 21:21–31. Jephthah (1186–1180 BCE) declared that 300 years before him (in 1486 BCE literal count), Israel took the land of Sihon king of the Ammonites, from the Arnon to the Jabbok and from the wilderness to the Jordan, and during 300 years (1486–1186) the Ammonites had not taken it back. Moses and Joshua took the land of Sihon before Israel had crossed over the Jordan and taken Jericho. (Note: Harmonizing the 300 years of Judges 11:4–28 back to the time of Israel in the wilderness, and the 450 years of Acts 11:19–20 as the period of time between Joshua and King Saul, is an apparent inconsistency which is resolved simply by proposing the speculative possibility that one or both of these numbers is/are figures of speech used by the speakers, and/or that many of the saving actions of the "governors" שופטים shoftim ("judges") in Israel could have occurred simultaneously or overlapped in time. This is not explicitly stated in the Book of Judges, which "plainly" relates their exploits solely as a sequential series of events, so that taking the texts literally, without recourse to the method of grammatico-historical exegesis, confronts uninstructed readers of the Bible with what appears to them to be an impossible inconsistency which can be unsettling. See Chronology of the Bible.)	Numbers 21:21–31; Deuteronomy 2:16–37; Judges 3:9–11; Judges 11:428
1457–1439	Israel served Eglon king of Moab 18 years.	Judges 2:19; Judges 3:12–14
1439–1359	Ehud delivered Israel and the land had rest for 80 years.: Amenhotep IV (Iknaten, –1385 to –1358) builds his new residence Amarna.	Judges 3:15–30
1359	After Ehud died, Shamgar delivered Israel.	Judges 3:31–4:1
1359–1339	Jabin king of Canaan cruelly oppressed the people of Israel for 20 years.: Sisera was slain. Jabin was subdued and finally destroyed.	Judges 4:1–7; Judges 3:31
1339–1299	The land of Israel had rest 40 years.	Judges 5:31
1299–1292	Israel was in the hand of Midian 7 years.	Judges 6:1
1292–1252; Ante C. 1245→	Gideon/Jerubbaal delivered Israel (1292). The land of Israel had rest 40 years in the days of Gideon (1292–1252).: Pharaoh Ramesses II reigned 1279–1213 BCE; The Israelites, led by Moses, leave Egypt, reach Canaan.	Judges 6:11–14; Judges 8:28
1252–1249; Ante C. 1235→	Abimelech ruled over Israel 3 years.	Judges 9:1–6; Judges 9:22
1249–1226	Tola judged Israel 23 years.	Judges 10:1–2
1226–1204	Jair judged Israel 22 years. (Note: Pharaoh Merneptah (1224–1214 BCE) mounted a campaign against Canaan in the 5th year of his reign (about 1220). In his record of that campaign, he records that, among others, Israel was utterly destroyed, evidence that the people of Israel were already a recognized group in Canaan. —Source: "Chronology of the Biblical Period", Joel F. Drinkard, Jr. and E. Ray Clendenen, Holman Illustrated Bible Dictionary, p. 293b.)	Judges 10:3
1204–1186	Israel was crushed and oppressed in the hand of the Philistines and in the hand of the Ammonites 18 years.: Crossing of the Jordan by the Israelites.; Destruction of Troy during the Trojan War (–1193, sixth level).	Judges 10:7–9
1186–1180; Ante C. 1187→	Jephthah judged Israel 6 years.: Ruth 1:1 Ante C. 1298. A period of famine began (10 years, c. 1183 – c. 1173). (Note: 1183 BCE – from 1092 BCE back to 1183 BCE, 2 generations plus 10 years. Counting back literally 2 generations, mechanically allotting the traditional 40 years each (total 80), from the birth of David reckoned as 1092 BCE, literal count, plus 10 years according to Ruth 1:1 (total 90 years) = 1182 BCE (1092 + 90), a time of famine during the historically documented Bronze Age collapse 1206–1150 BCE. Such a literalist calculation is pure speculation and has no recognized historical value. The Ussher chronology places the famine in 1298 BCE. The Book of Ruth is not dated by reference to a ruler or specific event, other than a famine. The totalled numbers of the years of the 2 generations (80 years) cannot be drawn from the letter of the text of the Bible; the Bible does not give the ages and years of the 2 generations, only the genealogy of Boaz, father of Obed (1st generation), the father of Jesse (2nd generation), the father of David. Many dismiss the genealogy in 4:18–22 as irrelevant. —Source: "Ruth, book of", Daniel I. Block, Holman Illustrated Bible Dictionary, pp. 1422–24.) Elimelech and Naomi, with their two sons Mahlon and Chilion went into the country of Moab. Elimelech died, and Naomi and her sons remained there about 10 years (Ruth 1:4). Mahlon and Chilion took Moabite wives, Ruth and Orpah.; See Bronze Age collapse (1206–1150 BCE)	Judges 12:7; Ruth 1:1–4
1180–1173	Ibzan judged Israel 7 years.: The famine in Israel continued. Mahlon and Chilion died childless.; Eli was born (1173).	Judges 12:8–10; Ruth 1:3–6
1173–1163	Elon judged Israel 10 years 1173–1163: c. 1172. The famine in Israel ended. Orpah went back to her people. Naomi returned with Ruth, and Boaz took Ruth as his wife. c. 1172 Obed, son of Boaz, was born about this time – the 1st generation, c. 40 years 1172–1132 – the 1st of 2 generations (80 years, literalist estimate) before the birth of David 1092.	Judges 12:11–12; Ruth 1:6–18; Ruth 4:13–17; 1 Samuel 4:15–18
1163–1155	Abdon judged Israel 8 years.	Judges 12:13–15
1155–1115	Israel was in the hand of the Philistines 40 years. This can be divided into 2 periods: 1155–1135. First, Israel was in the hand of the Philistines 20 years 1155–1135. c. 1132 Jesse, son of Obed, was born about this time, 2nd generation, c. 40 years 1132–1092, literalist estimate, before the birth of David 1092.; 1135–1115. (beginning Ante C. 1137→) Then Samson judged Israel 20 years during the latter half of the same period "in the days of the Philistines" (1135–1115 BCE).	Judges 13:1–5; Judges 15:20; Judges 16:31
no date	Unknown period of time (from Samson to Eli): for the outrage at Gibeah and the sending out of the messengers; for the calling out of the men of Israel for the war with Benjamin and the months that followed; for the smiting of Jabesh-gilead afterward; for the subsequent taking of wives for the survivors during the yearly feast of the LORD at Shiloh and diplomatic negotiation and settlement of grievance; for the repair of the cities. Judges 19–21.	Judges 19:30; Judges 20:8–11; Judges 21:5–12; Judges 21:16–23
1115	Eli was 59 years old (1174–1115), and he judged Israel 40 years (1115–1075).: Hannah brought her son Samuel to Eli, as soon as the child was weaned (about 2 to 5 years old), to "lend him to the LORD".; Samuel grew and the LORD was with him. "And all Israel from Dan to Beersheba knew that Samuel was established as a prophet of the LORD...And the word of Samuel came to all Israel."	1 Samuel 1:1–18; 1 Samuel 3:19–4:1; 1 Samuel 4:18
1115–1105	Eli was 68 years old (1173–1105) and judge of Israel 40 years (1115–1075). Saul was anointed king over Israel by Samuel the prophet "when Samuel became old" and Samuel was judge over Israel. 1 Samuel 6–10. Saul reigned 42 years (1105–1063/2), according to 1 Samuel 13:1. (Note: The text of the manuscript, translation or version of the Bible being consulted will affect the calculation and tabulation of the years in a literalist chronology based on the Old Testament texts/translations of 1 Samuel 13:1. Saul's age when he began to reign and the number of years he reigned according to published texts vary and remain uncertain (the variant Bible versions in English are here abbreviated): Saul was 30 years old when he began to reign, and he reigned 42 years (1105–1063/2). NIV, NLT, NASB, HCSB, ISV, NIRV Saul was [30] years old when he began to reign, and he reigned [42] years (1105 ? – 1063/2). GOD'S WORD Saul was [30] years old when he began to reign, and he reigned [40] years (1103 ? – 1063/2). NET Saul was 30 years old when he began to reign, and he reigned (?) years (unknown). Hexaplar Saul was 40 years old when he began to reign, and he reigned 32 years (1095–1063/2). NLV Saul was 40 years old when he began to reign, and he reigned (?) years (unknown). ASV, WEB, Amplified (est.) Saul was 30 years old when he began to reign, and he reigned 2 years (1065–1063/2). ERV Saul was (?) years old when he began to reign, and he reigned 2 years (1065–1063/2). CEV, Darby, Complete Jewish Bible (chabad.org), with Rashi commentary (chabad.org), Latin Vulgate, Luther Bibel 1545, MT (Masoretic) and JPS (1917) Jewish Hebrew-English, NRSV (Oremus) Saul was a son/child of one (1) year in his reigning/when he became king/began to reign, and he reigned 2 years over Israel. DR, Jubilee Bible 2000, Wycliffe Bible, YLT): According to 1 Samuel 4:10–10:24, Eli the high priest and judge at Shiloh died 98 years old, when the ark of the covenant was captured by the Philistines, after he had judged Israel 40 years – Eli seems to have died years before Samuel anointed Saul king over Israel. A literal reckoning of a 42-year reign has Saul anointed king 30 years before the ark was captured by the Philistines and Eli died, 50 years before David brought the ark up to Jerusalem after it had been in the house of Abinadab 20 years. (Note: Compare 1 Samuel 14:18 in multiple English translations together. Bible versions based on the Masoretic Text state that "the ark" was with Saul and the people as they went into battle. Bible versions based on the Septuagint state that "the ephod" was with Saul and the people as they went into battle – this reading is supported by the statement in the text (v. 19) that Saul told the high priest Ahijah "withdraw your hand" (from within the ephod). The possibility that after the death of Eli the ark was brought out of the house of Abinadab by Saul to go before the people in battle is only a speculation when the text of 1 Samuel 7:2 plainly states that the ark remained in the house of Abinadab in Kiriath-jearim for 20 years, "a long time", after the death of Eli. The possibility that Saul was king for 30, 28, 20 years (literal reckoning) as commander of 3,000 men of Israel (1 Samuel 13:2 and 14:52) before and during the battle with the Philistines when the ark was captured appears unlikely, when 1 Samuel 4–8 does not mention Saul and only long afterward in chapter 8 do the elders of the people say to Samuel, "Give us a king.")	1 Samuel 4:10–18; 1 Samuel 6:1–3; 1 Samuel 7:2; 1 Samuel 8:1; 1 Samuel 8:22; 1 Samuel 9:25–10:1; 1 Samuel 10:17–26; 1 Samuel 13:1; 1 Samuel 14:52
1103	Eli was 70 years old and judge of Israel 40 years (1115–1075). 1 Samuel 4:15–18. Saul son of Kish, of the tribe of Benjamin, was anointed king over Israel by Samuel the prophet "when Samuel became old" and Samuel was judge over Israel. 1 Samuel 6–10. Saul reigned 40 years (1103–1063/2), according to Acts 13:21, (Note: See Acts 13:21 multiple text comparison and commentaries (biblehub.com).) (Note: Acts 13:21. "...God gave them Saul son of Kish, a man of the tribe of Benjamin, for 40 years." Saul was anointed king of Israel by the prophet Samuel long after the high priest Eli died (1 Samuel 4:10–8:10) "when Samuel became old" and Samuel was judge over Israel (1 Samuel 7:15–16). The subsequent 7 months after Eli died, and the 20-year period during which the ark of the covenant remained in the house of Abinadab after the death of Eli, until David removed it to Jerusalem, does not allow a literal 40-year reign after Eli died, plus a literal 7 years 6 months for David's reign over the house of Judah before he was crowned king over all Israel and Judah, after which he brought the ark up to Jerusalem: a total of at least 48 years 1 month. Taking literally the numerical data of 40 years at face value as presented by the letter of the text of Acts 13:21, together with the 20 years of 1 Samuel 7:2, plus the 7 years 6 months of 2 Samuel 5:4–5 after Saul died and before David brought the ark up to Jerusalem, Saul would thus have been king 28 years before the death of Eli when the Philistines captured the ark, returned it to Israel after 7 months, and it was placed in the house of Abinadab for 20 years: therefore (strictly according to a reading of the letter of the text) long after the death of Eli, when Samuel was old, Saul was anointed king and reigned 28 years before Eli died. This apparent paradox is resolved by literalist researchers using the literal letter of the text (letterism) as a beginning, and applying the historical-grammatical method of exegesis, following the rules of sound interpretation, to uncover what they believe to be the real sensus litteralis historicus, the true "literal sense" of the text – the actual meaning intended by the biblical author. See below Historical-grammatical method in Biblical literalist chronology See above Apparent textual inconsistencies See also Figure of speech and Hyperbole —Sources: Catechism of the Catholic Church (CCC) n. 116 Martin Anstey, Romance of Bible Chronology Edwin Thiele, Mysterious Numbers of the Hebrew Kings) and according to some readings of 1 Samuel 13:1.: A literal reckoning of the beginning of the 40-year reign of Saul according to Acts 13:21 gives a resultant date of 1103 BCE: – beginning of David's reign over all Israel 1055 BCE – beginning of David's prior 7 year 6 month reign over the house of Judah 1063/2 (1055 BCE + 7 years 6 months = 1063/2 BCE) – beginning of Saul's 40-year reign over Israel 1103 (1063/2 BCE + 40 years = 1103 BCE) See Translations and versions: variant readings of the reign of Saul	1 Samuel 4:8–10; 1 Samuel 6:1–3; 1 Samuel 7:2; 1 Samuel 8:1; 1 Samuel 8:22; 1 Samuel 9:25–10:1; 1 Samuel 10:17–26; 1 Samuel 13:1; Acts 13:21
1095	Eli was 88 years old and judge of Israel (1115–1075). Saul was anointed by Samuel the prophet "when Samuel became old" and Samuel was judge over Israel. 1 Samuel 6–10. Saul reigned 32 years (1095–1063/2) according to 1 Samuel 13:1.: According to 1 Samuel 4:10–10:24 Eli the high priest and judge over Israel died 98 years old when the ark of the covenant was captured by the Philistines, and after he had judged Israel 40 years – Eli seems to have died years before Samuel anointed Saul king over Israel. A literal reckoning of a 32-year reign has Saul anointed 20 years before the ark was captured by the Philistines and Eli died (1075), 40 years (1095–1055) before David removed it from the house of Abinadab and brought it up to Jerusalem 8 years after Saul died (32 + 8 = 40).	1 Samuel 6–10
1092	The year David son of Jesse was born. Eli was 82 years old and judge of Israel (1115–1075). Saul had been king over Israel 13 years (1105–1092), 11 years (1103–1092), 3 years (1095–1092).	1 Samuel 13:1; 2 Samuel 5:4–5; 2 Samuel 6:1–2
1075; Ante C. 1116	The Ark of the Covenant was captured by the Philistines. Eli died. He was 98 years old (1173–1075); he had judged Israel 40 years (1115–1075). The Ark remained in the land of the Philistines 7 months.: David was 17 years old (1092–1075).; Samuel judged all Israel after Eli died. 1 Samuel 4:10–7:17; Saul had remained king over Israel 30 years (1105–1075), 28 years (1103–1075), 20 years (1095–1075), and he continued to reign 12 more years (he reigned a total of 42 years 1105–1063/2, 40 years 1103–1063/2, 32 years 1095–1063/2).	1 Samuel 4:10–6:1; 1 Samuel 7
1075	The Ark of the Covenant was sent back to Israel, and it remained in the house of Abinadab 20 years at Kiriath-Jearim (1075–1055).	1 Samuel 6:2–16; 1 Samuel 7:1–2; 2 Samuel 5:4–6:11
1075–1064; Ante C. 1096–1057	Samuel judged Israel 11 years after Eli died (1075–1064).: He made his sons judges (Ante C. 1096).; He anointed Saul king (Ante C. 1095).; 1065. Saul was one year old when he began to reign (1066–1065 BCE). (Note: Several literalist Bible translators present Saul as being one year old when he became king (1 Samuel 13:1): "Saul was a child of one year when he began to reign..." Douay–Rheims Bible "Saul was a son of one year when he became king..." Jubilee Bible 2000 "Saul was a son of one year..." Wycliffe Bible "A son of a year [is] Saul in his reigning..." Young's Literal Translation See 1 Samuel 13:1 – multiple translations. Some versions state in footnotes that the "Hebrew text is defective", and "The number is lacking in Heb." Some Bible footnotes and commentaries offer additional speculative interpretations of the meaning of "one year" according to what their authors as researchers see as the actual "literal sense" according to the rules of sound exegesis (for example, Douay–Rheims Bible, Young's Literal Translation).) He reigned 2 years (1065–1063/2). 1 Samuel 13:1.; When Saul was rejected Samuel anointed David as king (Ante C. 1070).; David slew Goliath (Ante C. 1062), and entered Saul's service. Psalm 151; Saul began to fear David, and sought some way to kill him. Jonathan made a covenant with David. David fled into the wilderness (Ante C. 1060). Saul killed the priests at Nob.; Samuel died (c. 1064) (Ante C. 1057). Saul searched for David, to kill him.	1 Samuel 7:15–8:7; 1 Samuel 9–12; 1 Samuel 13:1; 1 Samuel 15:1; 1 Samuel 16:1–13; 1 Samuel 18:3; 1 Samuel 19:1; 1 Samuel 20:8–17; 1 Samuel 22:17–19; 1 Samuel 25:1; 1 Samuel 26:2; Psalm 151
1064–1063/2	David fled and dwelt at Ziklag 1 year 4 months.	1 Samuel 27:1–4; 1 Samuel 27:7
1063/2; Ante C. 1055	The year Saul was slain on Mount Gilboa with his sons. He died 72 years old, 70 years old, 32 years old, 3 years old, age unknown. Compare Acts 13:21, 1 Samuel 7:2; 13:1 and 2 Samuel 5:4–6:11: David departed from Ziklag, and went to Hebron.; David was 30 years old (1092–1062).	1 Samuel 7:2; 1 Samuel 13:1; 1 Samuel 31; 2 Samuel 1:1–2:3; 2 Samuel 5:4–6:11; Acts 13:21
1062–1055	David at Hebron was anointed king over the house of Judah (1062).: He reigned over Judah 7 years 6 months (1062–1055).	2 Samuel 2:4–7; 2 Samuel 5:4–5
1055; Ante C. 1044	David was anointed king over Israel by all the elders of Israel.: David took Jerusalem, and brought the ark up to Jerusalem from the house of Abinadab where it had been kept 20 years (1075–1055).; When Uzzah died, David placed the ark in the house of Obed-edom 3 mo. After Obed-edom was blessed, David brought the ark into the city of David.; David was 37 years old.	2 Samuel 5:3–10; 2 Samuel 5:17–6:11
1055–1022	David reigned over all Israel and Judah 33 years. According to 2 Samuel 15:1–12 (Hebrew text) during the period of David's 33-year reign over Israel (long before David had become "old and advanced in years" 1 Kings 1:1, see 2 Samuel 3–24) – years after David had exiled his son Absalom – 2 years after Absalom had been brought back Absalom gradually "stole the hearts of the men of Israel" and "It came to pass after forty years / At the end of forty years" Absalom then made final preparations to be declared king at Hebron. He and his forces were defeated, Absalom was killed, and David continued to reign – through the rebellion of Sheba son of Bichri, through a subsequent 3-year famine, through another war with the Philistines, and afterward through his census of the nation and the plague following which ended with the purchase of the threshing floor for sacrifice, and through the entire period when Adonijah moved to usurp David as king (1 Kings 1–2). It is evident that a literal 40-year period cannot be inserted as being only one of the many episodes which marked David's literal 33-year reign. Some translations "speculatively" render the number as four years based on the Greek and Syriac translations as against the Hebrew text which some commentaries declare to be in error. See ScriptureText.com multilingual 2 Samuel 15:7 multiple text comparison with multiple commentaries on the number "forty" in the Hebrew text of 2 Samuel 15:7.: Book of Psalms. See Psalms of Asaph	2 Samuel 5:4–5; 2 Samuel 15:7; 1 Kings 2:10–11; 1 Chronicles 16:4–37
1022; Ante C. 1014	The year David died. He was 70 years old (30 + 40) (1092–1022).: Solomon sat upon the throne of David, and he reigned 40 years (1022–982).; Rehoboam was born (1022).	1 Kings 2:11–12; 1 Kings 11:42–43; 1 Chronicles 29:26–28; 2 Chronicles 1:1
1018; Ante C. 1012	Solomon began to build the house of the LORD the 4th year of his reign (1022–1018).: From the end of the reign of Zedekiah and the burning of the temple, back to the 4th year of the reign of Solomon, the literal biblical total is 431 years.; The 4th year of Solomon (1018) according to a literal reading of 1 Kings 6:1 was the 480th year after the people of Israel came out of the land of Egypt, giving the date of the Exodus as 1498 BCE (431 + 480 = 911 years, 1498–587 BCE).; The literal biblical sum of the years 2 Chronicles through Exodus from the 4th year of Solomon (1018) back to the Exodus is 559 years, giving the date of the Exodus as 1577 BCE (431 + 559 = 990 years, 1577–587 BCE).	1 Kings 6:1; Psalm 72; Psalm 127
1011	Solomon finished building the house of the LORD the 11th year of his reign (1022–1011). He was 7 years building it (1018–1011).: See Book of Proverbs and Song of Songs Proverbs of Agur and The Words of King Lemuel Psalms of Solomon and Odes of Solomon The Bible does not give the name of the author of Ecclesiastes or the name of the author of The Wisdom of Solomon; the name of Solomon does not appear in the texts of those books of the Bible. The Odes of Solomon should not be confused with the Book of Odes.	1 Kings 6:37–38
1002	Saul becomes first king of Israel (-1002 to -1000) and is defeated by Philistines.	1 Samuel 8–31
1000	Accession of David as king of united kingdom of Judah and Israel (-1000 to -960).	2 Samuel 5:3–5

=== The Divided Monarchy to the Destruction of the Temple 982–587 BCE ===
Before the Common Era (BCE)	Event	Bible texts
982; Ante C. 975	The year Solomon died (age not given). He had reigned 40 years (1022–982).: Rehoboam began to reign.; Beginning of the Divided Monarchy: the Kingdom of Judah and the Kingdom of Israel.	1 Kings 11:42–12:20; 2 Chronicles 9:30–10:17
982–965/4	Rehoboam reigned 17 years (982–965), and he died. He was 58 years old (41 + 17) (1022–964): 977. The 5th year of the reign of Rehoboam. Shishak king of Egypt came up against Jerusalem: "he took away everything".; 965. According to 1 Kings 14:21 Rehoboam died the 17th year of his reign.; 964. According to 1 Kings 15:1 he died the 18th year of the reign of Jeroboam, who had begun his own reign shortly after the beginning of Rehoboam's reign.	1 Kings 12:1–2; 1 Kings 12:20; 1 Kings 14:21; 1 Kings 14:25–15:1; 2 Chronicles 12:2–13
964–961; Ante C. 958→	Abijam reigned 3 years.	1 Kings 15:1–2; 2 Chronicles 13:1–2
961–920; Ante C. 955→	Asa reigned 41 years.: 933. King Solomon dies (-933), succeeded by his son Rehoboam I as king of Judah (to -917).	1 Kings 15:9–10; 2 Chronicles 16:13–17:1
920–895 →Ante C. 889	Jehoshaphat reigned 25 years, and he died. He was 60 years old (35 + 25).: Micaiah was prophet.; 917. The 3rd year of Jehoshaphat. Micaiah was sent with others to teach in the cities of Judah. 2 Chronicles 17:7–9.; 895. Micaiah foretold the death of Jehoshaphat. (Note: Micah is an abbreviated form of Micaiah. Micah was prophet during reigns of Jotham, Ahaz, Hezekiah (758–697). The interval of years from last year of Jehoshaphat through 1st year of Hezekiah 895 through 726, 170 years inclusive, makes it unlikely that Micaiah and Micah are the same. Compare 1 Kings 22:28 "Hear, all you peoples!" and Micah 1:2 "Hear, you peoples, all of you!". —Source: "Micah", Holman Illustrated Bible Dictionary, p. 1117, "Micaiah", p. 1119.)	1 Kings 22:8–28; 1 Kings 22:42; 2 Chronicles 17:7–9; 2 Chronicles 18:7–27; 2 Chronicles 20:31
895–887	Jehoram/Joram reigned 8 years, and he died. He was 40 years old (32 + 8).	2 Kings 8:16–17; 2 Chronicles 21:5
887–886	Ahaziah reigned 1 year, and he died. According to 2 Kings, he was 23 years old when he died (22 + 1). According to 2 Chronicles, he was 43 years old when he died (42 + 1).	2 Kings 8:25–26; 2 Chronicles 22:2
886–879	Athaliah reigned 6/7 years, and was slain.	2 Kings 11:1–16; 2 Chronicles 22:10–23:15
879–839; Ante C. 878→	Jehoash/Joash reigned 40 years, and he died. He was 47 years old (7 + 40).	2 Kings 11:21–12:1; 2 Chronicles 24:1
839–810 →Ante C. 810	Amaziah reigned 29 years, and he died. He was 54 years old (25 + 29).: Hosea and Jonah were prophets.; 824. The 15th year of Amaziah's reign. Jeroboam II (reigned 824–783) restored the borders of Israel according to the word of the LORD which he had spoken by Jonah son of Amittai. 2 Kings 14:23–25.; Hosea's prophetic ministry began during the reign of Jeroboam II.	2 Kings 14:1–2; 2 Kings 14:23–25; 2 Chronicles 25:1; Hosea 1:1; Jonah 1:1
810–758; Ante C. 810→	Azariah/Uzziah reigned 52 years, and he died. He was 68 years old (16 + 52).: Hosea, Jonah, Amos were prophets.; Nineveh, capital of Assyria, flourished 800–612 BCE.; Jonah son of Amittai was sent to Nineveh to cry against it.; Hosea continued his prophetic ministry during the reigns of Uzziah, Jotham, Ahaz, Hezekiah (c. 783–726).; Amos the prophet from Judah exercised his ministry during the reign of Uzziah beginning c. 767–762 BCE. "In the days of Uzziah...2 years before the earthquake." Amos 1:1; Zechariah 14:5 Traces of a major earthquake (dated 765–760 BCE) have been found at Hazor.; c. 761–758. During the reign of Menahem over Israel (reigned 771–761), Tiglath-pileser/Tiglath-pilneser/Pul king of Assyria came against the land. According to current historical dating based on Assyrian chronology, Tiglath-pileser reigned 745–727 BCE.	2 Kings 15:1–2; 2 Kings 15:17–20; 1 Chronicles 5:6; 1 Chronicles 5:26; 2 Chronicles 26:3; Hosea 1:1; Amos 1:1; Jonah 1:1; Jonah 3 Zechariah 14:5
758–742; Ante C. 758→	Jotham reigned 16 years, and he died. He was 41 years old (25 + 16).: Hosea, Jonah, Amos, Isaiah, Micah were prophets.; 758. The year of Isaiah's vision of the LORD in the Temple, and his call. Isaiah 6:1–8 "Here am I! Send me!" Isaiah exercised his prophetic ministry during the reigns of Uzziah, Jotham, Ahaz, Hezekiah (c. 759–697 inclusive). (Note: Many scholars divide the Book of Isaiah among 2 or more authors, but other scholars hold a single authorship. —Source: "Isaiah, book of", Harold Mosley and Steve Bond, Holman Illustrated Bible Dictionary, pp. 837b–41b.) He was told to prophesy until the land was utterly desolate and men were moved far away, which did not occur until the beginning of the Exile (587).; c. 742. Micah of Moresheth exercised his prophetic ministry during the reigns of Jotham, Ahaz, Hezekiah (c. 742–697 inclusive). Micah was a contemporary of Isaiah, Hosea and possibly Amos.	2 Kings 15:32–33; 2 Chronicles 26:23–27:1; 2 Chronicles 27:9; Isaiah 1:1; Isaiah 6:1–13; Micah 1:1
742–726	Ahaz reigned 16 years, and he died. He was 36 years old (20 + 16).: Hosea, Jonah, Amos, Isaiah, Micah were prophets.; 733. The 9th year of the reign of Ahaz. Isaiah foretold the sign of Immanuel when Rezin king of Syria and Pekah king of Israel came up to wage war against Jerusalem and besieged it.; 732. Ahaz sent messengers to Tiglath-pileser/Tiglath-pilneser/Pul king of Assyria asking for rescue from Rezin and Pekah.; Pul carried away the Reubenites, Gadites and the half-tribe of Manasseh into exile.	2 Kings 16:2–9; 2 Kings 17:1–6; 2 Kings 17:24; 1 Chronicles 5:6; 1 Chronicles 5:25–26; 2 Chronicles 27:9–28:1; 2 Chronicles 28:20
726–697; Ante C. 727→	Hezekiah reigned 29 years, and he died. He was 54 years old (25 + 29).: Hosea, Jonah, Amos, Isaiah, Micah, Joel were prophets.; 726. Joel was the name of a Levite who helped Hezekiah cleanse the Temple 1st year of his reign (726).; 725–722. Shalmaneser V king of Assyria (726–722 BCE) came against Hoshea king of Israel (who reigned 730–721), and besieged Samaria 3 years (725–722). The position of the Book of Joel among the early prophets in the Hebrew canon is considered evidence for an early date.; "A nation from the north", "the northerner", had come up against the land in a time of drought like a plague of locusts, "their appearance like the appearance of horses, like war horses they ran, as with the rumbling of chariots, like a powerful army drawn up for battle." Joel 2:4–5. An unprecedented plague of locusts was a metaphor and symbol of the Day of the Lord. (Tobit 1:1–2, 11–13; Judith 2:20; Joel 1:6–12, 1720; 2:2–11; Nahum 3:15–17.) Joel 1:17–20 does not mention locusts, only "seed shrivels under the clods", "fire has devoured the pastures", "the water courses are dried up", a time of severe drought. The drought is also mentioned in Jeremiah 14:1–6 and Amos 7:1–6. The LORD plainly told Amos the plague would not be locusts: "This shall not be.". Tobit and his fellow Naphtalites were taken captive into the land of the Assyrians to Nineveh into exile. Tobit 1:2–3.: 722. Sargon II king of Assyria began to reign 722. He sent his commander-in-chief to take Ashdod. Sargon finished the destruction of Samaria begun by his brother Shalmaneser V. Sargon was succeeded by his son Sennacherib. Tobit 1:18.; 714. The 14th year of Hezekiah (714), Sennacherib king of Assyria took all the fortified cities of Judah, and came against Jerusalem. The angel of the LORD slew 185,000 in the camp of the Assyrians, and Sennacherib went back to Nineveh. Sennacherib commanded the death of Tobit. Tobit 1:21–24.; c. 704. Merodach-baladan (reigned 721–711 and 704) sent a gift and envoys to Hezekiah. During the reign of Sargon II, Merodach-Baladan was little more than a puppet of Assyria, answering to Sargon.	2 Kings 18:1–2; 2 Kings 18:13; 2 Kings 19:20–36; 2 Kings 20:12; 2 Chronicles 28:27–29:1; 2 Chronicles 29:12–19; Tobit 1:1–22; Judith 2:11 DR; Judith 2:20 NRSV; Isaiah 6:9–13; Isaiah 7:10–20; Isaiah 36:1; Isaiah 37:33–37; Isaiah 39:1; Jeremiah 14:1–6; Joel 1:6–20; Joel 2:2–11; Amos 7:1–6; Nahum 3:15–17
697–642; Ante C. 698→	Manasseh reigned 55 years, and he died. He was 67 years old (12 + 55).: Isaiah and Nahum were prophets.; 681. The 16th year of Manasseh. Sennacherib king of Assyria was killed by his sons (681 BCE). 2 Kings 19:37; 2 Chronicles 32:21; Tobit 1:21. Esarhaddon then reigned (681–669 BCE). Ahikar immediately interceded for Tobit, who then became blind. Tobit was 56 years old (DR), 58 years old (RSV), 62 years old (NRSV, REB, NAB, NJB) when he became blind. Tobit 1:22–2:10; 14:2.; Prophets warn that the LORD will cast off Jerusalem like Samaria and the house of Ahab. 2 Kings 21:10–15. The LORD brought upon them the commanders of the army of the king of Assyria.; 673. After 8 years (681–673) Tobit was cured of his blindness. He was 64 years old, 66 years old, 68 years old. Tobit 14:2.; Manasseh was taken with hooks, bound, and brought to Babylon. He repented, and was brought back to Jerusalem, returning from exile. He then purified the house of the LORD. 2 Chronicles 33:10–16; Judith 4:3. (Note: In the 1899 edition of the Douay–Rheims Bible, prefatory notes correlate the period of the Book of Judith with the reign of Manasseh and state that the writer of this book was "generally believed to be the high priest Eliachim (also called Joachim)".) Prayer of Manasseh; Nahum exercised his prophetic ministry sometime after 650 BCE, before the death of Manasseh (642). Nahum 3:8–10 refers to the destruction of the Egyptian capital No-amon or Thebes (663) which had already occurred.; 642. Manasseh died. His son Amon succeeded him.	2 Kings 19:36–37; 2 Kings 21:1–2; 2 Kings 21:16–18; 2 Chronicles 32:21; 2 Chronicles 33:1; 2 Chronicles 33:10–16; 2 Chronicles 33:20; Tobit 1:22–2:11; Tobit 14:3; Judith 2:20; Judith 4:3; Isaiah 7:18–20; Isaiah 37:36–38; Joel 1:6–12; Micah 1:1; Micah 5:1; Nahum 3:8–10; Nahum 3:15–17; Prayer of Manasseh
642–640; Ante C. 643→	Amon reigned 2 years, and he died. He was 24 years old (22 + 2).: Isaiah and Nahum were prophets.	2 Kings 21:19; 2 Chronicles 33:21–25
640–609; Ante C. 641→	Josiah reigned 31 years, and he died. He was 39 years old (8 + 31).: Isaiah, Jeremiah, Nahum, Habakkuk, Huldah, Zephaniah were prophets.; 637. The year Tobit died 102 years old (DR). (Note: The text of the manuscript, translation or version of the Bible being consulted will affect the calculation and tabulation of the resulting numbers of the years in a literalist chronology. Tobit died 102 years old according to online Douay–Rheims Bible 1899 (American edition) – in 637 BCE, during the reign of Josiah. And his son Tobiah died 82 years later 99 years old in 555 BCE. Tobit died 112 years old according to online New Revised Standard Version (OREMUS)—in 627 BCE, during the reign of Josiah. And his son Tobiah died 100 years later 117 years old in 527 BCE. Tobit died 112 years old according to the 4 versions in The Complete Parallel Bible with the Apocryphal/Deuterocanonical Books: New Revised Standard Version NRSV, Revised English Bible REB, New American Bible NAB, New Jerusalem Bible NJB, © 1993, Oxford University Press, New York, Oxford. Tobit died 158 years old according to standard printed editions of RSVCE and KJV with Apocrypha Bibles – in 581 BCE, during the Exile, 31 years after Nineveh was destroyed. And his son Tobiah died 110 years later 127 years old in 471 BCE.); 630. The Book of Zephaniah.; 628. The 12th year of the reign of Josiah, he purged the land, and broke down the idols and altars of the Baals.; 627. The 13th year of Josiah son of Amon (627), the word of the LORD came to Jeremiah (1:2). The year Tobit died 112 years old (NRSV, REB, NAB, NJB).; 623. The 17th year of Josiah (623). The year Ezekiel was born (in 593 BCE he was 30 years old, the 5th year of Jehoiachin's exile). Ezekiel 1:1.; "I am rousing the Chaldeans, that bitter and hasty nation." Habakkuk 1:6–11. Habakkuk was a prophet of the late 7th century before the fall of Nineveh. In the Book of Habakkuk the Babylonians are called Chaldeans, so named for the region from which their rulers came.; 622. The 18th year of the reign of Josiah (622). The Temple was repaired, the Book of the Law was found, and the Jews were gathered (2 Kings 23:4–25; 2 Chronicles 34:3–18, 33; 35:17–19; Judith 4:1–3). Josiah in Jerusalem was king over Israel, "and made all who were in Israel serve the LORD their God". He gathered קהל qahal (Note: Strong's Exhaustive Concordance, Hebrew and Chaldee Dictionary of the Old Testament, 6950. קהל qahal, to convoke, assemble, gather. Qahal is the root of the word Qoheleth (Greek Ecclesiastes), translated "preacher", one who assembles or gathers the people.) the elders, priests and people together, and preached the book of the law to all the people both great and small, exhorting them to join in the covenant with the LORD (2 Kings 23:15–23; 2 Chronicles 34:29–33; 35:18; Ecclesiastes 1:12). (Note: The Bible shows Josiah greater and wiser than Solomon, which is not the popular tradition. 2 Kings 23:25 and Sirach 49:1–5. Josiah's wisdom did not depart from him as it departed from Solomon in his old age. 1 Kings 11:4, 6, 11, 33; Ecclesiastes 2:9. Both Qoheleth (Hebrew) and Ecclesiastes (Greek) denote one who presides over an assembly, that is, a preacher or teacher (cf. 2 Kings 23:1–3 and 2 Chronicles 34:29–32). Traditionally, Solomon has been identified as the author of Ecclesiastes/Qoheleth, "but in modern times many, including a large number of conservative scholars" assign the book to an author and a period later than Solomon. The Bible does not state that Solomon ever read the Book of the Law, the Law of Moses, or the Torah, to the assembly of Israel. cf. 1 Kings 8 and 10:24, and 2 Chronicles 5:2–7:10 and 9:22–23 —Sources: "Josiah", M. Stephen Davis, Holman Illustrated Bible Dictionary, pp. 954–56. "Ecclesiastes, book of", Stephen R. Miller, Holman Illustrated Bible Dictionary, pp. 452b–55a.) The Pesach that year surpassed all those celebrated in the days of the judges and the days of all the kings of Israel and Judah. 2 Kings 23:15–23. Josiah was told all the evil that would befall the people and all the inhabitants of Judah and Jerusalem after his death. 2 Kings 22:15–20; 2 Chronicles 34:23–28. The Book of Ecclesiastes. "Vanity of vanities, saith the Preacher [Qoheleth], vanity of vanities; all is vanity." (Note: Strong's Exhaustive Concordance, Hebrew and Chaldee Dictionary of the Old Testament, 1892. הבל hebel, heh'-bel; or (rarely in the abstract) הבל hab-ale'; from 1891; emptiness or vanity; figuratively something transitory and unsatisfactory; often used as an adverb: – (in KJV from an idiom peculiar to the Hebrew) altogether, vain, vanity.) 1:2; 612. The 28th year of Josiah (612). Nineveh the Assyrian capital fell to Nabopolassar and Cyaxares. Nahum 2.; 609. The 39th year of Josiah (609). 3 years after the fall of Nineveh, Pharaoh Neco/Necho/Nechoh, Second Pharaoh of the Twenty-sixth Dynasty, began to reign (reigned 609–594 BCE). When Neco advanced toward Carchemish, Josiah met him in battle and was killed (609).	2 Kings 22:1; 2 Kings 22:15–23:25; 2 Kings 23:29–30; 2 Chronicles 34:1–3; 2 Chronicles 34:8–18; 2 Chronicles 34:23–33; 2 Chronicles 35:16–25; Tobit 14:2–11 DR; Tobit 14:2–11 NRSV; Judith 4:3; Ecclesiastes 1:12; Ecclesiastes 2:9; Sirach 49:1–5; Jeremiah 1:1–2; Ezekiel 1:1; Nahum 2 Habakkuk 1:6–11; Zephaniah 1:1; Zephaniah 2:13–15
609; Ante C. 610	Jehoahaz reigned 3 months, and Pharaoh Neco took him away.: Neco installed Eliakim/Jehoiakim as king of Judah.; Isaiah, Jeremiah and Zephaniah were prophets.	2 Kings 23:31–34; 2 Chronicles 36:1–3
609–598; Ante C. 610→	Eliakim/Jehoiakim reigned 11 years, and he died. He was 36 years old (25 + 11).: Isaiah, Jeremiah, Zephaniah and Daniel were prophets.; 609. Jeremiah 26. Jeremiah spoke in the Temple, and was threatened with death.; Pharaoh Neco seized Gaza as a base. Jeremiah 47:1.; 606. The 3rd year of Jehoiakim. Daniel 1:1–5. Jehoiakim and the treasures of the Temple were taken to Babylon, and Daniel, Hananiah, Azariah, Mishael, young men, were taken with them. (see below – 598. The 11th year of the reign of Jehoiakim. Nebuchadnezzar bound Jehoiakim in fetters to take him to Babylon and carried off with him part of the vessels of the Temple. 2 Chronicles 36:4–7.); In Babylon, young Daniel saved Susanna from the false witness of the elders. Daniel 13:41–51, 60–62.; 605. The 4th year of Jehoiakim. Jeremiah called Baruch, who wrote on a scroll the words of the LORD. Jeremiah 46:2. Pharaoh Neco was defeated at Carchemish by Nebuchadnezzar. Nabopolassar died. The 1st year of Nebuchadnezzar II king of babylon (605). He reigned 43 years, 605–562 BCE. Jeremiah declared the decree of the LORD that peoples will serve the king of Babylon 70 years. (Reckoning from this date 605 – 70 years = 535 BCE.) Nebuchadnezzar defeated Pharaoh Neco at Carchemish, completing Babylon's conquest of Palestine. 2 Kings 24:7; Jeremiah 46:2.; 603. The 6th year of Jehoiakim (603). Daniel 1:5, 17–20. Nebuchadnezzar in Babylon found Daniel, Hananiah, Azariah and Mishael ten times better than all magicians and enchanters in his kingdom. He gave them Babylonian names, "Belteshazzar", "Shadrach", "Meshach" and "Abednego".; 601. The 8th year of Jehoiakim (601). Darius the Mede was born (he was 62 years old in 539).; 599. The 10th year of Jehoiakim (599), the 7th year of Nebuchadnezzar. Jeremiah 52:28. The king of Babylon carried away 3,023 persons. (See below 591 BCE – 3,023 persons carried away "In the 7th year" of Ezekiel 20:1.); 598. The 11th year of the reign of Jehoiakim, the 7th year of Nebuchadnezzar. According to 2 Kings 24:6 Jehoiakim died (598) and slept with his fathers. According to 2 Chronicles 36:4–7 Nebuchadnezzar bound Jehoiakim in fetters to take him to Babylon and carried off with him part of the vessels of the Temple. (see above – 606. The 3rd year of Jehoiakim. Jehoiakim and the treasures of the Temple were taken to Babylon. Daniel 1:1–5.); The Bible does not say that Nebuchadnezzar released Jehoiakim during or after his 3rd year to allow him to return to Jerusalem and then took him away a second time to Babylon in his 11th year – such a conclusion, however reasonable, is speculative only and cannot be drawn solely from a plain reading of the strict letter of the text of the Bible alone according to the method of letterism, which only presents an apparent inconsistency, but which entirely accords with the grammatico-historical method of exegesis which a priori presumptively takes both texts as reliable, consistent and historically factual, and as such, provides an illustrative example of the difference in the two literalist methodologies. See Inference.	2 Kings 23:36; 2 Kings 24:6; 2 Chronicles 36:5–7; Isaiah 6:9–13; Jeremiah 25:1–12; Jeremiah 26; Jeremiah 46:2; Jeremiah 47:1; Daniel 1:1–7; Daniel 13:41–51; Daniel 13:60–62
598; Ante C. 590	Jehoiachin/Jeconiah/Coniah reigned 3 months and ten days. Isaiah, Jeremiah, Zephaniah and Daniel were prophets.: Ezekiel was taken to Babylon along with King Jehoiachin and 10,000 others, including political and military leaders and skilled craftsmen. Mordecai was one of the captives taken to Babylon with Jeconiah. Esther 11:4.; According to 2 Kings 24:6–17 Jehoiachin was 18 years old when he was carried away to Babylon. According to 2 Chronicles 36:9–10 he was 8 years old.	2 Kings 24:6–17; 2 Chronicles 36:9–10; Esther 11:2–4; Jeremiah 22:24–30; Jeremiah 24:1; Jeremiah 29:1–2; Jeremiah 37:1
598–588; Ante C. 590→588	Mattaniah/Zedekiah was 21 years old (598) when he was made king of Judah by Nebuchadnezzar. He reigned 11 years, until he was 32 years old (587).: Isaiah, Zephaniah, Jeremiah and Daniel were prophets.; 598. In the beginning of the reign of Zedekiah (598/7) Jeremiah put yoke-bars on his neck, and warned the envoys of Edom, Moab, Sidon, and the court of Judah. Jeremiah 27:1–3. Hananiah broke the bars, and died the same year. Zedekiah sent Elasah and Gemariah to Babylon to Nebuchadnezzar. Jeremiah sent word by them to the elders and to the priests that 70 years must be completed (598/7 – 70 = 528/7 BCE). Zephaniah reported to Jeremiah the false prophesy from Babylon, and Jeremiah declared Shemaiah of Nehelam in Babylon to be a false prophet, to be punished by God. Jeremiah 29:1–3, 8–10, 24–32.; 597. The siege of Jerusalem in the 9th year of Nebuchadnezzar, the 2nd year of Zedekiah.; 594. The 4th year of Zedekiah king of Judah, the 12th year of the reign of Nebuchadnezzar over the Assyrians in Nineveh. Nebuchadnezzar made war against King Arphaxad/Cyaxares who ruled over the Medes in Ecbatana. Judith 1:1–6.; 593. The 5th year of Zedekiah king of Judah, the 5th year of the exile of Jehoiachin/Jeconiah/Coniah. "in the 5th year at the time when the Chaldeans took Jerusalem and burned it with fire", Baruch read to Jeconiah son of Jehoiakim "this book". Baruch took the vessels that had been carried away from the Temple to return them to the land of Judah. Offerings could still be made on the "altar of the Lord our God", and prayer for "Nebuchadnezzar king of Babylon, and for the life of Belshazzar his son". Baruch 1:1–12. Ezekiel's vision of the LORD and his call at the age of 30, the age priests normally were inducted into office (593). Ezekiel 1:1; Numbers 4:30.; 592. The 6th year of Zedekiah king of Judah, the 6th year of Jehoiachin (592). Ezekiel's vision of the appearance of a man clothed in linen. Ezekiel 8:1.; 591. The 7th year, the word of the LORD when the elders came to query Ezekiel. Ezekiel 20:1. 3,023 persons were carried away by Nebuchadnezzar. Jeremiah 52:28. (See above 599 BCE "the 7th year of Nebuchadnezzar" Jeremiah 52:28 – 6 years before the call of Ezekiel in "the 5th year of the exile of King Jehoiachin" 593 BCE Ezekiel 1:2.); 589. The 9th year, 10th month, 10th day. "The king of Babylon has this day laid siege to Jerusalem." 2 Kings 23:31–24:1; Ezekiel 24:1–2. The 9th year of Zedekiah, Nebuchadnezzar besieged Jerusalem. Jeremiah 39:1. Zephaniah was the priest whom Zedekiah sent to Jeremiah asking him to pray for the nation. Jeremiah 21:1–7; 37:3–21. Pharaoh Hophra began his 19-year reign in Egypt (589–570 BCE). At the beginning of his reign he tried to drive the Babylonian army away from its siege of Jerusalem. Jeremiah 37:5; 46:17. Jeremiah was imprisoned.; 589/8. Jeremiah continued in prison, in the court of the guard, then the princes lowered him into the cistern to die. Ebed-melech interceded for Jeremiah, drew him out, and Jeremiah was put back into the court of the guard. Jeremiah 38.; 588. The 10th year of Zedekiah, the 17th year of Nebuchadnezzar of Babylon. Nebuchadnezzar overthrew and utterly destroyed Arphaxad, and plundered Ecbatana. Judith 1:13–15. Ezekiel prophesied against Pharaoh and all Egypt. Ezekiel 29:1–2; 2 Kings 24:7. Jeremiah in prison bought the field. Jeremiah 32:1–15. Zedekiah freed the slaves, but they were taken back. Jeremiah 34:8–11	Numbers 4:30; 2 Kings 23:36; 2 Kings 24:17–25:7; 2 Chronicles 36:11–20; Judith 1:1–6; Judith 1:12–15 NRSV; Judith 2:1–14 NRSV compare Judith 2 DR; Jeremiah 21:1–7; Jeremiah 27:1–3; Jeremiah 28:1–29:3; Jeremiah 29:24–32; Jeremiah 32:1–15; Jeremiah 34:8–11; Jeremiah 37:3–21; Jeremiah 38:1–13; Jeremiah 39:1; Jeremiah 46:17; Jeremiah 52:28; Baruch 1:1–12; Ezekiel 1:1; Ezekiel 20:1; Ezekiel 24:1–2; Ezekiel 29:1–2; Daniel 5:18–22
587	The 11th year of Zedekiah, the 18th year of Nebuchadnezzar. Isaiah, Zephaniah, Jeremiah, Daniel and Ezekiel were prophets.: 587. Nabuchodonosor/Nebuchadnezzar sent his general Holofernes to take revenge on the whole territory of Cilicia, Damascus, Syria, Moab, Ammon, all Judea, and Egypt. Judith 2:1. The Jews had only recently returned from the captivity (2 Chronicles 34–35), and all the people of Judea were newly gathered together, and the sacred vessels and the altar had been newly consecrated after their profanation. Judith 4:1–3. (Note: Judith 4:1–3 (DR) citation is placed here according to a literal reading of the text which uncritically takes "Nabuchodonosor" as one of the forms of the name of Nebuchadnezzar II (as noted in the Douay–Rheims preface to Judith, and as used in Baruch 1:11–12 Douay–Rheims), also called Nebuchadrezzar in the books of Jeremiah and Ezekiel; just as Tiglath-pileser is also called Tiglath-pilneser and Pul, and Azariah king of Judah is also called Uzziah, and Jehozadak the high priest is called Jozedech and Jozadak in 1 Chronicles (6:14–15), Ezra and Nehemiah. —Source: articles "Jehozadak", "Tiglath-Pileser", "Uzziah", Holman Illustrated Bible Dictionary, pp. 879, 1595, 1644.); Judith beheaded Holofernes, the Assyrian army was dismayed and they fled. Judith 14:18–15:2. "no one ever again spread terror among the people of Israel in the days of Judith or for a long time after her death." Judith 16:25. Ezekiel declared that Pharaoh of Egypt will be brought down. Ezekiel 31:1.; The Siege of Jerusalem.; The 11th year of Zedekiah, the 4th month, the wall was breached. Zedekiah was captured, his sons and the nobles were put to death (Jeremiah 39:2–9). Zephaniah, the Second Priest, was put to death (Jeremiah 52:24–27). Zedekiah, 32 years old, was blinded and taken to Babylon. The Temple was burned, and the people taken into exile. 832 persons were taken captive. Jeremiah 52:29.; Jeremiah prophesied "until the captivity of Jerusalem in the 5th month." Jeremiah 1:3; 52:29.; Esau/Edom rejoiced and gloated over the destruction of Jerusalem, looted the city, cut off the fugitives, and handed over the survivors. Lamentations 4:21–22; Ezekiel 36; Obadiah 10–14. (Note: The prophetic author of Obadiah in verses 10–14 refers to the past. The book itself belongs to the early postexilic period. —Source: "Obadiah 10.", "Obadiah, book of", Leslie C. Allen, Holman Illustrated Bible Dictionary, pp. 1204b–05.); Gedaliah was appointed ruler of Judah by Nebuchadnezzar of Babylon.; 587 BCE marked the beginning of the 70 years of serving the king of Babylon according to Jeremiah 25:8–12 (70 years = 587–517 BCE). The 19th year and 1st year of the reign of Nebuchadnezzar (587 BCE).	2 Kings 25:2–9; 2 Kings 25:22; 2 Chronicles 34–35; 2 Chronicles 36:17–19; Judith 2:1–14; Judith 4:1–3; Judith 13:4–10; Judith 14:8–15:2; Jeremiah 39:2–9; Jeremiah 52:24–29; Lamentations 4:21–22; Baruch 1:11–12 DR; Ezekiel 31; Ezekiel 36; Obadiah 10–14

=== The Babylonian Captivity to the Decree of Cyrus 586–539 BCE ===
Before the Common Era (BCE)	Event	Bible texts
586; Ante C. 588	The 19th year and 2nd year of the reign of Nebuchadnezzar. The 12th year of the exile of Jehoiachin/Jeconiah/Coniah. Isaiah, Jeremiah, Daniel and Ezekiel were prophets.: Ezekiel 32:1. Lamentation over Pharaoh king of Egypt.; Jeremiah 52:12–16. Nebuzaradan burned the house of the LORD and every great house, the army broke down all the walls around Jerusalem. Isaiah 6:13; Jeremiah 37:8–10; 2 Kings 25:8–9.; Gedaliah was appointed governor of Judah. 2 Kings 24:22; Jeremiah 40:1–12.; Daniel 2. In the 2nd year Daniel interpreted the dream of the great image. Daniel was made ruler over the whole province of Babylon.; Daniel 3. Nebuchadnezzar made an image of gold. Hananiah, Azariah, Mishael (Shadrach, Meshach, Abednego) were thrown into the furnace. They came out unharmed, and were promoted.	2 Kings 25:8–9; 2Kings 25:22; Isaiah 6:11–13; Jeremiah 37:8–10; Jeremiah 39:2–9; Jeremiah 40:1–12; Jeremiah 52:12–16; Ezekiel 32:1–16; Daniel 2–3
582; Ante C. 587	The 23rd year and 6th year of the reign of Nebuchadnezzar. Isaiah, Jeremiah, Daniel and Ezekiel were prophets.: Jeremiah 52:30. Nebuzaradan carried away captive 745 persons.; The book of Lamentations was written about this time by an eyewitness – similarities between Lamentations and Jeremiah in tenor, theology, themes, language, and imagery favor authorship by Jeremiah.; Ishmael son of Nethaniah murdered Gedaliah the appointed governor (Ante C. 587).	2 Kings 25:23–25; Jeremiah 40:13–41:10; Jeremiah 52:30
582/1	The 24th year and 7th year of the reign of Nebuchadnezzar. Isaiah, Jeremiah, Daniel and Ezekiel were prophets.: Johanan son of Kareah and the forces with him fought against Ishmael, but Ishmael escaped. Johanan led the people to Egypt against God's word, to escape Babylonian retaliation, and forced Jeremiah to go with them.; The end of Isaiah's prophetic ministry. Isaiah 6:9–13.; Jeremiah in Egypt foretold the capture and exile of Pharaoh Hophra (reigned 589–570 BCE); See Martyrdom of Isaiah	Isaiah 6:11–12; Jeremiah 41:11–44:30
581	Tobit, 158 years old (RSVCE, KJV), told his son to "leave Nineveh, because what the prophet Jonah said will surely happen", and then he died. (The destruction foretold by Jonah, described by Nahum and Zephaniah, occurred in 612 BCE.): Nebuchadnezzar II burns Jerusalem (-581). Historians do not agree precisely on the date Jerusalem was burned and destroyed by the Babylonians under Nebuchadnezzar II, who ended the reign of Zedekiah king of Judah (see section "Archaeological dates" above; also Zedekiah and Siege of Jerusalem (Note: There has been some debate as to when the second siege of Jerusalem took place. Though there is no dispute that Jerusalem fell the second time in the summer month of Tammuz (Jeremiah 52:6), William F. Albright dates the end of Zedekiah's reign (and the fall of Jerusalem) to 587 BCE, whereas Edwin R. Thiele offers 586 BCE, and Bernard Grun proposes 581 BCE (The Timetables of History). • Thiele, Edwin, The Mysterious Numbers of the Hebrew Kings, (1st ed.; New York: Macmillan, 1951; 2nd ed.; Grand Rapids: Eerdmans, 1965; 3rd ed.; Grand Rapids: Zondervan/Kregel, 1983). ISBN 082543825X, 9780825438257. • Hughes, Jeremy, Secrets of the Times (Sheffield: Sheffield Academic Press, 1990) 229. • McFall, Leslie, "A Translation Guide to the Chronological Data in Kings and Chronicles", Bibliotheca Sacra 148 (1991) 45. • Strand, Kenneth, "Thiele's Biblical Chronology as a Corrective for Extrabiblical Dates", Andrews University Seminary Studies 34 (1996) 310, 317. • Finegan, Jack, Handbook of Biblical Chronology (rev. ed.; Peabody, MA: Hendrickson, 1998) 257–259. • Young, Rodger C., "When Did Jerusalem Fall?" Journal of the Evangelical Theological Society 47 (2004) 21–38.)). Taking Bernard Grun's proposed 581 BCE as the key historical base date in a literalist table moves forward by 6 years all the dates above in this table, as well as all those dates below which are arithmetically calculated therefrom. Given that a secure historical date has not been established, the choice of a particular base date from among the range of various dates proposed by archaeologists, scholars and historians is substantially arbitrary.	Tobit 14:1–4 DR; Tobit 14:1–4 NAB; Tobit 14:1–4 NRSV; Tobit 14:2–11 RSVCE, KJV; Jonah 3 Nahum 2 Zephaniah 2:13–15
571	The 27th year of the exile of Jehoiachin/Jeconiah (598–571). The word of the LORD to Ezekiel that Nebuchadnezzar will be given the land of Egypt and its wealth for his army as recompense for his labor for the LORD.	Ezekiel 29:17–21
562; Ante C. 562	Nebuchadnezzar II died (reigned 605–562 BCE). He was succeeded by his son Evil-merodach/Awel-marduk. Daniel was prophet.	2 Kings 25:27
561–560	Evil-merodach/Awel-marduk began to reign in 561. Daniel was prophet.: Jehoiachin was freed from prison the 37th year of his exile (598–561), the first year of the reign of Evil-Merodach/Awel-marduk (reigned 561–560).; Evil-merodach died 560 BCE.	2 Kings 25:27–30; Jeremiah 52:31–34
560–539	From the reign of Neriglissar (560) to the 1st year of Cyrus (539). Daniel was prophet.: 560. Neriglissar, king of Babylon 560–558; c. 559. Cyrus organized the Persians into an army, revolted, defeated his father Astyages and grandfather Cambyses I, and assumed the throne (reigned 559–530 BCE).; 557. Labashi-Marduk ruled Babylon briefly.; 556. Nabonidus, king of Babylon 556–539.; 555. The year Tobiah, son of Tobit, died 99 years old, 82 years after the death of his father (637). Tobit 14:16 (DR).; 553. Belshazzar son of Nabonidus was made co-regent, and given charge of the defense of Babylon (553–539). The Bible plainly says that Belshazzar was the son of Nebuchadnezzar. Daniel 5:1, 10–11, 22; Baruch 1:11–12. The names of Neriglissar, Labashi-Marduk and Nabonidus are not in the Bible.; 553. The 1st year of Belshazzar (553). Daniel's vision of 4 beasts and the Ancient of Days.; 550. The 3rd year of Belshazzar (550). Daniel's vision of the ram and the he-goat. Gabriel interpreted the vision.; 539. The last year of Nabonidus, and of Belshazzar.	Tobit 14:16 DR; Baruch 1:11–12; Daniel 5:1–22; Daniel 7:1–14; Daniel 8:1–17
539; Ante C. 536	The 17th year of Nabonidus, and the 14th year of Belshazzar. Belshazzar's feast. Daniel interpreted the writing on the wall. Belshazzar proclaimed Daniel/Belteshazzar the 3rd ruler in the kingdom.: 539. The Persian Cyrus II the Great entered Babylon without a fight. Belshazzar was slain, and Darius the Mede, son of Ahasuerus, a Mede, received the kingdom 62 years old (601–539). Daniel 5:30; 8:3–4. Daniel 6:28 seems to indicate that Cyrus and Darius ruled simultaneously.; 539. The 1st year of Darius the son of Ahasuerus, by birth a Mede. Daniel 9. Daniel's prayer regarding the 70 years of Jeremiah. Gabriel came and revealed that 70 weeks of years are decreed. Daniel 9:1–2, 21–25. The identity of Darius cannot be drawn from the text of the Bible alone; the Bible does not say that Darius the Mede and Darius I Hystaspes are different persons, the text does not say they are the same. (see below—522. The 1st year of Darius the son of Ahasuerus, by birth a Mede.); 539. The 1st year of King Cyrus (reigned 559–530 BCE). The Decree of Cyrus (539) freed the captives Babylon had taken. The first group of about 50,000 exiles, led by Sheshbazzar prince of Judah, departed and came to the house of God at Jerusalem. The literal reading of Ezra 1–7 does not say that Cyrus issued a decree that the city of Jerusalem was to be restored and rebuilt, but only the house of God. After their arrival in Jerusalem, Sheshbazzar was replaced by Zerubbabel, a leader of the people together with Jeshua/Joshua the high priest.; 539. Daniel continued until the 1st year of King Cyrus, and prospered during the reign of Darius and the reign of Cyrus the Persian. Daniel was a companion of Cyrus the king, and the most honored of his friends. Daniel 1:21; 6:28; 14:1–2.	2 Chronicles 36:22–28; Ezra 1 Ezra 2:1–2; Ezra 3:1–2; Ezra 4:1–3; Daniel 1:21; Daniel 5:30–31; Daniel 6:28; Daniel 8:3–4; Daniel 9:1–2; Daniel 9:21–25; Daniel 14:1 DR; Daniel 14:2 NAB

=== The Second Temple to Alexander the Great 538–334 BCE ===
Before the Common Era (BCE)	Event	Bible texts
538; Ante C. 535	The beginning of the 2nd year of the coming to the house of God at Jerusalem. Daniel was prophet.: The builders laid the foundation of the Temple of the LORD. Ezra 3:8–13.; The people of the land intimidated the Jews, brought accusations against them.; Work on the house of God ceased (18 years, 538–520). Ezra 4:4–5, 24.	Ezra 3:8–13; Ezra 4:1–5; Ezra 4:24
536; Ante C. 536	The 3rd year of Cyrus king of Persia. Daniel was prophet.: Daniel's vision of a man in linen, who revealed what was to befall his people in the latter days. Daniel 10–12.; In –536 Cyrus II, the Great, of Persia (–553 to –529) freed the Jews from the Babylonian Captivity and aided their return to Israel. 536 BCE.	2 Chronicles 36:22–23; Ezra 1:1–4; Daniel 10:1–14
530–520	Cyrus the Great died 4 December 530. He was succeeded by Cambyses II son of Cyrus (reigned 530–522).: 527. The year that Tobiah, son of Tobit, died 117 years old, 100 years after the death of his father (627). "Before dying he rejoiced over Nineveh's destruction" (612 BCE), and he praised God. Tobit 14:14–15 (NRSV, REB, NAB, NJB).; 522. Cambyses was killed. Following the death of Cambyses II, Darius I Hystaspes the Great seized power (reigned 18 years, 522–486).; 522. The 1st year of Darius the son of Ahasuerus, by birth a Mede. Daniel 9. Daniel's prayer regarding the 70 years of Jeremiah. Gabriel came and revealed 70 weeks of years are decreed. The identity of Darius cannot be drawn from the text of the Bible alone; the Bible does not say that Darius the Mede and Darius I Hystaspes are different persons, the text does not say they are the same. (see above—539. The 1st year of Darius son of Ahasuerus, by birth a Mede.); During this period work on the Temple had stopped (538–520), until the 2nd year of Darius (520).	Ezra 4:24; Tobit 14:14; Daniel 9:1–3; Daniel 9:23–27
520–519; Ante C. 519	520. The 2nd year of Darius the king (520).; Haggai and Zechariah were prophets.: The Jews resumed rebuilding the house of God with the support of the prophets Haggai and Zechariah. Ezra 5:1–2.; 29 August 520, 2nd year, 6th month, 1st day of the month. Haggai's 1st message. Haggai 1:1–11. See Book of Haggai; 21 September 520, 2nd year, 6th month, 24th day of the month. Temple building resumed. Haggai 1:12–15; 17 October 520, 2nd year, 7th month, 21st day of the month. Haggai's 2nd message. Haggai 2:1–9; October–November 520, 2nd year, 8th month. Zechariah's ministry began. Zechariah 1:1–6. See Book of Zechariah; 18 December 520, 2nd year, 9th month, 24th day of the month. Haggai's 3rd and 4th messages. Haggai 2:10–23; 15 February 519, 2nd year, 11th month, 24th day of the month. Zechariah's night visions. Zechariah 1:7–6:8. Literally, "the going forth of the word of the LORD to restore and rebuild Jerusalem" (Daniel 9:24–27) was announced by Zechariah in Jerusalem in the 2nd year, 11th month, 24th day of the month. Zechariah 1:14–17. 70 weeks of years = 490 years, from 519 to 29 BCE. See Herod the Great.; Zechariah was also a leading priest at the time of Joiakim's high priesthood, possibly the same as the prophet. Nehemiah 12:16.	Daniel 9:23–27; Haggai 1:1–2:23; Zechariah 1:1–6:8
518–517	The 4th year of Darius the king (reigned 522–486 BCE). Zechariah and Obadiah were prophets.: 518. Zechariah continued his prophetic ministry. He removed 3 corrupt leaders. The people rejected his leadership, and weighed out 30 pieces of silver as his wages. Zechariah chapters 7–14.; 517. The end of the 70 years of serving the king of Babylon (587–517 BCE) according to Jeremiah 25:8–13. The Jews began rebuilding the city, finishing the walls and repairing the foundations. Ezra 4:12; The Book of Obadiah historically belongs to the early postexilic period at the end of the 6th century (c. 525–501). The Nabataeans infiltrated Edom and Moab from a homeland southeast of Petra (which later became their capital). Indications that this was already happening at the time the book was written can be seen in Obadiah 1, 6–7; See Darius I: early reign Behistun Inscription Achaemenid Empire	Ezra 3:12; Jeremiah 25:12–13; Obadiah 1 Obadiah 6–7; Zechariah 7:1; Zechariah 11:4–14
486	"...and in the reign of Ahasuerus in the beginning of his reign they wrote an accusation against the inhabitants of Jerusalem." Ezra 4:6.: The Hebrew name Ahasuerus is usually identified with Xerxes I who reigned 486–465/4, known in Esther as "Ahasuerus" and as "The Great King Artaxerxes", son of Darius the Great and grandson of Cyrus the Great.	Ezra 4:4–6; Esther 1:1–2; Esther 11:2; Esther 13:1; Esther 16:1
484–483; Ante C. 519	The 2nd year of the reign of "Artaxerxes the Great"/Ahasuerus.: Mordecai's dream. Esther 11:2–12:6.; Mordecai reported the plot of eunuchs Gabatha and Tharra to kill Artaxerxes. Haman son of Hammedatha in great honor with the king, sought injury to Mordecai and his people because of the eunuchs. Esther 11:2–12:6.; 483. The 3rd year of the reign of Ahasuerus (483), Vashti was deposed. Beautiful young virgins were sought, and Hadassah/Esther was made queen. Esther 1:1–3, 12–21; 2:1–4, 8, 16–17.	Esther 11:2–12:6; Esther 1:1–2:17
479–478; Ante C. 515	The 7th year of Ahasuerus (reigned 486–465/4 BCE).: Ezra went up from Babylon to Jerusalem, from the 1st month to the 5th month.; At his word, from the 9th month to the 1st month (479–478), the Jews separated from the people of the land and put away their foreign wives and children.	Ezra 7:1–7; Ezra 10:10–12
474–473; Ante C. 510→508	The 12th year of Ahasuerus.: 474. The pur ("lot", plural purim, "lots") was cast before Haman in the 1st month. An edict was issued in the king's name to annihilate all the Jews on the 14th day of the 12th month (473 BCE).; Haman was exposed, and executed. Mordecai was given Haman's position. He issued a decree authorizing the Jews to defend themselves and destroy those who hated them.; 473. They smote their enemies, and the days of Purim were fixed.	Esther 3:7–13; Esther 13:1–7; Esther 7:5–8:12; Esther 16:1–24; Esther 9:11–32
471	The year that Tobiah, son of Tobit, died 127 years old, 110 years after the death of his father (581). "But before he died he heard of the destruction of Nineveh" (612 BCE), and he rejoiced.	Tobit 14:14–15 RSVCE, KJV
c. 460–445	The Book of Malachi is not dated by a reference to a ruler or specific event.: Internal evidence (Malachi 1:6–11; 2:1–3; 3:1, 10) as well as its position in the canon favors a postexilic date. The social and religious problems Malachi addressed reflect the situation in Ezra 9 and 10 and Nehemiah 5 and 13, suggesting dates either before Ezra's return (c. 460) or just before Nehemiah's second term as governor (Nehemiah 13:6–7) (c. 435).	Malachi 1:6–11; Malachi 2:1–3; Malachi 3:1; Malachi 3:10
c. 446/5	"...and in the days of Artaxerxes..." (Artaxerxes I who reigned 465–424): Bishlam, Mithredath and Tabeel, and Rehum and Shimshai, obtained in writing from Artaxerxes king of Persia authorization to make a decree that the men rebuilding the wall and the city of Jerusalem cease.; They went in haste and by force and power made them cease.	Ezra 4:7–23
445; Ante C. 454	The 20th year of Artaxerxes.: Hananiah came to Susa. He told Nehemiah, cup-bearer to the king, that the wall of Jerusalem was broken down and the gates had been burned with fire.; Nehemiah obtained a decree from the king that Jerusalem be rebuilt. He went to Jerusalem, and inspected the wall. Nehemiah 1:1–2:15. 490 years from the decree of Artaxerxes (445 BCE) through Nehemiah to the governors of province Beyond the River that "the city may be rebuilt", according to Daniel 9:25, gives a date of 45 CE (445 + 45 = 490) during the reign of the Roman emperor Claudius (reigned 41–54 CE).; The wall was rebuilt in 52 days and finished in the 7th month, 1st day. Nehemiah 6:15.; Nehemiah the governor gave his brother Hanani and Hananiah, governor of the cattle, charge over Jerusalem. Nehemiah 7:2.; The people were enrolled by genealogies. 1 in 10 volunteered to live in Jerusalem.; When the 7th month came Ezra read the Law before the Water Gate, to an assembly of 42,360 persons and 7,337 servants. Nehemiah 7:5, 66–67; 8:1–2. The 24th day of the 7th month the Israelites separated themselves from all foreigners. Nehemiah 9:1–2.	Nehemiah 1:1–2:15; Nehemiah 6:15; Nehemiah 7:2–5; Nehemiah 7:73–8:1; Nehemiah 7:66–67; Nehemiah 8:1–2; Nehemiah 9:1–2; Nehemiah 12:27–45; Nehemiah 13:1–3
445–433 →Ante C. 442	Nehemiah was governor of Judah 12 years, from the 20th year to the 32nd year of Artaxerxes (reigned 465–424, 41 years).: 433. Nehemiah returned to Artaxerxes in the 32nd year of Artaxerxes.; After some time (date not stated in the Bible) he received leave to return to Jerusalem, and he cleansed the Temple. The sabbath rest was enforced.	Nehemiah 5:14; Nehemiah 13:6–12
c. 445–333	High priests recorded in Book of Nehemiah 12:10–11: Jeshua, father of Joiakim (c. 586–537 BCE) Ezra 2:2, 36, 40; Joiakim, father of Eliashib (c. 510 BCE) Nehemiah 12:10, 12, 26; Eliashib, father of Joiada, Nehemiah 3:1, 20; 12:10; 13:28; Ezra 10:6; Joiada, father of Jonathan (c. 425 BCE) Nehemiah 12:10–11, 22; 13:28; Jonathan, father of Jaddua, Nehemiah 12:11, 14	Nehemiah 12:1–26
c. 7th–5th century	See: Book of Job; The author of the book of Job is not known; it was composed some time between the 7th and 5th centuries BCE. "There was a man in the land of Uz..."	Job 1:1–3; Obadiah 8
356–334	Alexander was born in 356 BCE, son of Philip of Macedon.: 336 BCE. Philip of Macedon was assassinated, and Alexander at the age of 20 became king of the Greeks (reigned 336–323 BCE).; 334 BCE. Alexander won a series of victories over the Persians. Daniel 8:5–7.	Daniel 7:7; Daniel 7:23; Daniel 8:5–7; Daniel 11:3; 1 Maccabees 1:1–4

=== Jaddua the high priest to John Hyrcanus 333–104 BCE ===
Before the Common Era (BCE)	Event	Bible texts
c. 333	Jaddua, son of Jonathan, was high priest probably at the end of the Persian period when Alexander the Great approached Jerusalem about 333 BCE.	Nehemiah 12:1–11; Nehemiah 12:22
	See: First Book of Maccabees (333–124 BCE)	
333–323 →Ante C. 323	Alexander, son of Philip of Macedon defeated Darius, and became king of the Persians and Medes (333 BCE). 1 Maccabees 1:1.: 333. Alexander continued his victorious military march into Syria, Egypt, Persia, Media, northern India. Daniel 7:7, 23; 8:6–7.; 323 (Ante C. 323). He returned to Babylon where he died at the age of 33.	Daniel 7:7; Daniel 7:23; Daniel 8:6–7; 1 Maccabees 1:1–7
323–217	"Then his officers began to rule, each in his own place. They all put on crowns after his death, and so did their sons after them for many years; and they caused many evils on the earth" (323–175). 1 Maccabees 1:8–9. Compare Daniel 8:5–7; 11:3–44. (Note: Daniel 11:3–44. When read literally these verses plainly describe the dynastic histories of the Ptolemies in Egypt (the king of the south) and the Seleucids in Syria (the king of the north), the two divisions of the Hellenistic empire that were of interest to the author (verse 6). In verses 10–20 is described the struggle between the two kingdoms for control of Palestine, in which the Seleucids were eventually victorious. The reference in verse 20 is to Seleucus IV, who sent Heliodorus to plunder the temple treasure in Jerusalem (2 Maccabees 3). Finally, verses 21–45 describe the career of Antiochus IV and his persecution. —Source: New American Bible, Daniel 11:5–45 "The Hellenistic Age", footnotes. —Rulers and battles are listed individually by name with dates.): 323. Onias I became high priest (323–300 or 290).; c. 309–300. (Ante C. 187) A letter was sent to Onias I the high priest from Arius I king of the Spartans (reigned 309–265 BCE) stating that the Spartans and the Jews are brothers. 1 Maccabees 12:7, 19–23.	Daniel 8:8; Daniel 11:3–44; 1 Maccabees 1:8–9; 1 Maccabees 12:7; 1 Maccabees 12:19–23
281–246	Reign of Ptolemy II Philadelphus: His marriage to Arsinoe I. Her line afterward was not recognized. Daniel 11:5–6.; c. 250. The marriage of Antiochus II Theos and Berenice Syra of Egypt which ended in tragedy. Daniel 11:6; Establishment of the Library of Alexandria; Letter of Aristeas: Greek translation of the Torah.; See Ptolemaic rulers	Daniel 11 NAB literalist footnotes Daniel 11:5–6
219	Simon, son of Jochanan/Onias, became high priest (219–196 BCE).: The house of God was renovated, the Temple was reinforced, the wall was built with turrets for the Temple precincts, and the reservoir was dug vast like a sea.	Sirach 50:1–4; 1 Maccabees 12:7
	See: Third Book of Maccabees (217 June–c. 216/215)	
217–c. 215	Persecution under Ptolemy IV Philopator: 22 June 217 BCE. Ptolemy IV Philopator defeated Antiochus III at the Battle of Raphia. 3 Maccabees 1:1–5; Daniel 11:11.; c. 216. Philopator issued a decree condemning all Jews to be destroyed.; c. 215. He reversed his command and freed them, and ordered that no one harm them. Those who had renounced Judaism to save themselves were executed.	Daniel 11:11; 3 Maccabees 1:1–5; 3 Maccabees 3:1–5; 3 Maccabees 3:12–29; 3 Maccabees 6:38–7:16
200	Syria defeated Egypt at the Battle of Paneas. Daniel 11:13. The siege of Sidon after the Battle of Paneas. Daniel 11:15	Daniel 11:13–15
197	Antiochus III betrothed his daughter to Ptolemy V Epiphanes.	Daniel 11:17
	See: Second Book of Maccabees (c. 196–161 BCE)	
196–175	Onias III became high priest (196–175 BCE).: 190. Roman general Scipio defeated Antiochus at Magnesia. Daniel 11:18.; Seleucus, the king of Asia (187–175 BCE), defrayed from his own revenues the expenses connected with the sacrificial services in the Temple.	Daniel 11:18; 2 Maccabees 3:1–3
177 or 78–77; Ante C. 177	"The 4th year of the reign of Ptolemy and Cleopatra, Dositheus, who said that he was a priest and a Levite, and Ptolemy his son brought to Egypt the...Letter of Purim...": The specific identities of this particular Ptolemy and his co-regent Cleopatra together with the period of their reign cannot be drawn from the Bible. Two dates have been proposed for the 4th year of the reign of the otherwise unspecified Ptolemy and Cleopatra. The New American Bible annotation suggests that Ptolemy refers to Ptolemy XII Auletes and Cleopatra to Cleopatra V Tryphaena, and the date referred to as 78–77 BCE during their reign; the Douay–Rheims Bible (1899 American edition) suggests in its footnote annotation to Esther 11:1 "Ante C. 177" (177 BCE). This date falls within the reign of Ptolemy VI Philometor, who ruled jointly with his mother, Cleopatra I Syra, until her death in 176 BCE.; See Ptolemaic rulers and consorts. List of Ptolemies. Letter of Purim Rabbinic Greek translation of the Jewish scriptures	Esther 11:1
no date	During the high priesthood of Onias III 196–175 BCE.: Seleucus, the king of Asia (187–175), sent Heliodorus "a collector" to Jerusalem to take the treasures of the Temple. When he entered he was struck down and flogged. Onias interceded in prayer with an offering for his life, he lived, and with his forces went back to the king.	Daniel 11:20; 2 Maccabees 3:1–35
175	Seleucus IV Philopator king of Syria died. He was succeeded by Antiochus IV Epiphanes.	Daniel 8:9; Daniel 11:21; 1 Maccabees 1:10; 2 Maccabees 4:7
175–170; Ante C. 175→	175. Antiochus Epiphanes began to reign in the 137th year of the kingdom of the Greeks (175 BCE). 1 Maccabees 1:10; Daniel 7:8.; 175. Onias III, son of Simon II, high priest (196–175 BCE), was deposed by Jason (175 BCE), who had obtained the office of the high priesthood by corrupt means. 2 Maccabees 4:7.; Jason introduced Hellenism, and built a Greek gymnasium in sight of the Temple.; Menelaus obtained the high priesthood by outbidding his brother Jason. He was high priest until his execution in 162 BCE. 2 Maccabees 4:1–14. "Jason and his company revolted from the holy land and the kingdom and burned the gate and shed innocent blood." 2 Maccabees 1:7–8; 4:26.; 174. Onias III "the prince of the covenant" was murdered by Andronicus at the request of Menelaus. 2 Maccabees 4:23–35; Daniel 11:22.	Daniel 7:8; 1 Maccabees 1:10; 2 Maccabees 4:7; 2 Maccabees 4:23–35
169–167; Ante C. 170→168	The persecution under Antiochus Epiphanes.: 169. Antiochus invaded Egypt with a strong force, engaged Ptolemy in battle, captured the fortified cities, and plundered Egypt. 1 Maccabees 1:16–19; Daniel 7:24; 11:22.; 169. (Ante C. 170) Antiochus returned in the year 143 (169 BCE). He went up against Israel, and entered the Temple. He murdered many. 1 Maccabees 1:20–24; Daniel 11:28.; 168. Antiochus sent his 2nd expedition into Egypt. 2 Maccabees 5:1; Daniel 11:29–30.; 167. (Ante C. 168) A chief collector of tribute came from Antiochus. He killed many, plundered the city, burned it, and fortified the city of David (the citadel) against the Jews. By decree of the king Judaism was forbidden. Daniel 7:25; 8:10–12.; Early in December, 167 BCE, on the 15th day of the month Chislev in the year 145, "they erected a desolating sacrilege upon the altar of burnt offering." 1 Maccabees 1:29–54; Daniel 11:31; 12:11.; In Modein, Mattathias slew the king's officer who was monitoring the sacrifices, tore down the pagan altar, fled with many, and revolted. They received "a little help" when the Hasideans joined him. 1 Maccabees 2:15–44; Daniel 11:33–35.	Daniel 7:24; Daniel 7:25; Daniel 8:10–12; Daniel 11:20–22; Daniel 11:28–31; Daniel 11:33–35; Daniel 12:11; 1 Maccabees 1:16–19; 1 Maccabees 1:20–24; 1 Maccabees 1:29–54; 1 Maccabees 2:15–44; 2 Maccabees 5:1
166–164	The Maccabean revolt: 166. Mattathias died in the 146th year of the kingdom of the Greeks (166 BCE). 1 Maccabees 2:70.; Judas Maccabeus took command and led the revolt against the Greeks (166–160 BCE). 1 Maccabees 3–9; 2 Maccabees 5:27–15:37; Daniel 11:32–35; 12:1–3.; 165. The Greek generals Apollonius and Seron were crushed by Judas. Antiochus sent Lysias to wipe out Judea and Jerusalem, and crossed over the Euphrates river in the 147th year (165 BCE) to collect revenues from Persia. Lysias, Ptolemy, Nicanor and Gorgias, also Philip, Timothy and Bacchides, were repeatedly defeated in battle (165–164). 1 Maccabees 3:10–4:35; 2 Maccabees 8:8–9:1; 164. The Dedication of the Temple (Hanukkah) in the 148th year (164 BCE). 1 Maccabees 4:36–56; 2 Maccabees 10:1–9; Daniel 12:12.	Daniel 8:13–14; Daniel 11:32–35; Daniel 12:1–3; Daniel 12:12; 1 Maccabees 2:65–3:1 1 Maccabees 3:10–4:35; 1 Maccabees 4:36–56; 2 Maccabees 5:27; 2 Maccabees 8:8–9:1; 2 Maccabees 10:1–9
163–160	The death of Antiochus IV to the death of Judas Maccabeus.: 163. Antiochus the king died in the 149th year (163 BCE) in the mountains somewhere between mount Zion "the glorious holy mountain" and "the sea" in Persia. (Note: Zagros Folded Zone with Zagros Mountains between the Caspian Sea and Babylon where Antiochus IV Epiphanes died according to 1 Macc. 6 and 2 Macc. 9, and Daniel 11:45. "between the sea and the glorious holy mountain...he shall come to his end with none to help him."—"...among the mountains in a strange land." A majority of Biblical scholars maintain that Daniel wrongly prophesied that Antiochus would die in Palestine. Daniel's prophesy of the death of Antiochus IV Epiphanes "among the mountains in a strange land" (2 Maccabees 9:28; Daniel 11:44–45) is controverted. Daniel 11:45 does not specify which "sea". Some students of the Bible [source: "Daniel", S. Miller, Holman Illustrated Bible Dictionary] identify Antiochus literally with Daniel 11:21–44, which accords with the description of his policies and actions in 1 and 2 Maccabees. 1 Maccabees 6:1–16 and 2 Maccabees 9:1–16, 28 shows that Antiochus died travelling on the great east-west highway running through Persia, northeast of Judea and Mount Zion and southwest of the southern shores of the Caspian Sea, in the mountainous Zagros region of Persia between Ecbatana and Babylon. It is evident that he did not die in Palestine between Mount Zion and the Mediterranean Sea. Traditionally, "the sea" and "the great sea" in the Bible is the Mediterranean (Joshua 1:4; 9:1; 15:12 and 15:47; 23:4;Isaiah 11:11; Jeremiah 25:19–22; Ezekiel 47:19;Daniel 7:2–3; compare Joel 2:20 "eastern sea" and "western sea", and Micah 7:12 "from sea to sea"). This is the understanding of a majority of Old Testament Biblical scholars such as C. L. Seow [Daniel, 2003, Westminster John Knox Press, Louisville, Kentucky, ISBN 9780664256753], and John J. Collins, Peter W. Flint, and others [The Book of Daniel: Volume 1 Composition and Reception, 2000, Brill, ISBN 9789004116757] who hold that Daniel 11:45 refers to the mountains of Judea between Mount Zion and the Mediterranean Sea, or more specifically to Mount Zion, and conclude that the prophesy that Antiochus would die in Palestine "is totally inaccurate" since he died in Persia. Bible translations of this passage differ: some have Antiochus pitching his pavilion "between the seas", others have it "on the glorious holy mountain", while others more literally have it "between the glorious holy mountain and the sea" (see variant translations at Daniel 11:44–45). The conclusion of most Old Testament scholars is that the account in Daniel 11 is completely accurate through verse 44, but wrong in verse 45, and therefore it must have been completed near the end of the reign of Antiochus but before his death in December 164, or at least before news of it reached Jerusalem. But this scholarly reading of "the sea" as the Mediterranean, and those translations having Antiochus' pavilion "on/in the glorious holy mountain (Zion)" in Palestine, are simply dismissed as wrong by a literalist plain reading of the Biblical text (context) as it relates to the death of Antiochus among the mountains of Persia "in a strange land" between the Caspian Sea and Mount Zion. —Sources: "Mediterranean Sea", Philip Lee, Holman Illustrated Bible Dictionary, pp. 1097–98. "Daniel, book of", Stephen R. Miller, Holman Illustrated Bible Dictionary, pp. 386–88. "Antiochus", Holman Illustrated Bible Dictionary, pp. 76–77. New American Bible, Daniel 11:5–45 and footnote; 1 Maccabees 6:1 and footnote; 2 Maccabees 9:1–28 and footnote.) He had departed from Ecbatana and was driving furiously toward Jerusalem when he was struck down. See Zagros Mountains. 1 Maccabees 6:1–16; 2 Maccabees 9:1–28; Daniel 7:26; 11:44–45; 12:11.; Antiochus Eupator was set up as king (163 BCE). He invaded Judea. Antiochus ordered Menelaus executed. He was thrown into a tower full of ashes and suffocated to death. 2 Maccabees 9:1–10, 28; 13:1–8.; 162. Judas besieged the citadel in the 150th year (162). 1 Maccabees 6:19–20.; 161. (Ante C. 162) Demetrius began to reign in the 151st year (161–152 BCE). Alcimus presented a large bribe to Demetrius, and incited the king against Judas. Demetrius set up Alcimus as high priest. Nicanor was sent to kill Judas, but he hesitated. When Judas avoided him, Nicanor threatened to destroy the Temple.; Judas' vision of the high priest Onias and the prophet Jeremiah. Nicanor was slain in battle and beheaded (161 BCE). "And from that time the city has been in the possession of the Hebrews." 1 Maccabees 7:1, 26–35, 43–50; 2 Maccabees 14:3–4, 12–14; 15:12–16, 25–37; 160. Bacchides and Alcimus encamped against Jerusalem in the 152nd year (Ante C. 161). Judas Maccabeus was slain at the Battle of Elasa (160 BCE). 1 Maccabees 9:1–18.	Daniel 11:44–45; Daniel 12:11–12; 1 Maccabees 6:1–16; 1 Maccabees 6:19–20; 1 Maccabees 7:1; 1 Maccabees 7:26–35; 1 Maccabees 7:43–50; 2 Maccabees 2:1–10; 1 Maccabees 9:1–18; 2 Maccabees 9:28; 2 Maccabees 13:1–8; 2 Maccabees 14:3–4; 2 Maccabees 14:12–14; 2 Maccabees 15:12–16; 2 Maccabees 15:25–37
159–140; Ante C. 160→140	Jonathan Apphus accepted the leadership and took the place of his brother Judas (160/159 BCE). 1 Maccabees 9:28–31.: 159. (Ante C. 160) Alcimus gave orders to tear down the wall of the inner court of the sanctuary in the 153rd year (159 BCE). He was stricken with paralysis and died in great agony. 1 Maccabees 9:54–56.; 152. (Ante C. 153) In the 160th year (152 BCE) Alexander Epiphanes landed and occupied Ptolemais. Demetrius marched out to meet him, and was killed. Alexander appointed Jonathan Apphus, brother of Judas Maccabeus, high priest. October 23–30, 152 BCE, Jonathan discharged his office as high priest. 1 Maccabees 10:1–21.; 150. Ptolemy set out from Egypt with his daughter Cleopatra, came to Ptolemais in the 162nd year (150 BCE), and gave her to Alexander in marriage. Jonathan was given honor, and clothed in purple. 1 Maccabees 10:55–62.; 147. (Ante C. 148) Demetrius son of Demetrius came from Crete, and appointed Apollonius governor of Coelesyria. He came against Jonathan with a large force in the 165th year (147 BCE), and was defeated. 1 Maccabees 10:67–85.; 145. (Ante C. 145) Alexander was beheaded by Zabdiel the Arab, Ptolemy died 3 days later, and Demetrius became king in the 167th year (145 BCE). 1 Maccabees 11:14–19.; 143. (A.M. 3861, Ante C. 143) Trypho treacherously shut up Jonathan and his men in the city of Ptolemais and slew them. 1 Maccabees 12:39–48. In the reign of Demetrius in the 169th year (143 BCE), the Jews in Jerusalem wrote to the Jews in Egypt in the critical distress which came upon them in the years after Jason and his company had revolted from the holy land and burned the gates and shed innocent blood. 2 Maccabees 1:7–8.; 142. (Ante C. 143) In the 170th year (142 BCE) the yoke of the Gentiles was removed from Israel. The 1st year of Simon, great high priest and commander and leader of the Jews. The land had rest all the days of Simon. 1 Maccabees 13:41–42; 14:4.; 141. (Ante C. 142–141) The citadel was cleansed, and the Jews entered it with praise in the 171st year (141 BCE). Simon made his son John commander with his residence at Gazara. 1 Maccabees 13:51–53; 140. (Ante C. 140) The 3rd year of Simon the great high priest, he agreed to be high priest, and commander and ethnarch of the Jews and priests and protector. Demetrius marched into Media to make war against Trypho in the 172nd year (140 BCE). Arsaces sent a commander, who defeated and took him. 1 Maccabees 14:1–3; 14:47.	1 Maccabees 9:28–31; 1 Maccabees 9:54–56; 1 Maccabees 10:1–21; 1 Maccabees 10:55–62; 1 Maccabees 10:67–85; 1 Maccabees 11:14–19; 1 Maccabees 12:39–48; 1 Maccabees 13:41–42; 1 Maccabees 13:51–53; 1 Maccabees 14:1–4; 1 Maccabees 14:47; 2 Maccabees 1:7–8
138–104; Ante C. 139→124	The 5th year of Simon the great high priest to the death of John Hyrcanus son of Simon.: 138. (Ante C. 139→138) In the 174th year (138 BCE), Antiochus son of Demetrius I and younger brother of Demetrius II besieged Dor, and shut Trypho in.; Antiochus broke off relations with Simon, Trypho escaped, and Cendebeus invaded Judea. Judas and John, sons of Simon the high priest, took Simon's place at the head of the army and defeated Cendebeus. 1 Maccabees 15:10–14, 37–41; 16:1–10.; 134. (Ante C. 135→133) In the 177th year, Ptolemy son of Abubus and son-in-law of the high priest killed Simon and 2 of his sons at Dok. John Hyrcanus son of Simon killed the assassins sent against him and became high priest of an independent Judea in the 177th year (134 BCE). Daniel 7:27; 1 Maccabees 16:14–24.; 132. The 38th year of the reign of Ptolemy VIII Physcon Book of Sirach/Ecclesiasticus: "I arrived in Egypt in the 38th year of the reign of King Euergetes, and while there, I found a reproduction of our valuable teaching. I therefore considered myself in duty bound to devote some diligence and industry to the translation of this book." Sirach Foreword (Sirach 1:1).; 124. (Ante C. 124) The Jews in Jerusalem and Judea in the 188th year (124 BCE) sent a letter to the Jews in Egypt that they are to see that the Hanukkah is kept, but referred to as "Sukkot of Kislev". 2 Maccabees 1:9.; 104. John Hyrcanus died. John was ruler and high priest from 134 BCE until his death in 104.; The Book of Wisdom has been dated to about a hundred years before the coming of Christ, written by a devout Jew as an admonition to his fellow rulers and kings.; The Book of Judith – "The unknown author composed this edifying narrative of divine providence at the end of the second or the beginning of the first century BCE." – c. 100 BCE. "During the life of Judith and for a long time after her death, no one again disturbed the Israelites." Judith 16:25 (NAB). (Note: The Book of Judith is an oblique parabolic tale of the Maccabean triumph over the hostile forces of the enemies of God: Judith beheaded Holofernes and Judas Maccabeus beheaded Nicanor. See Judith 14:11: "As soon as it was dawn they hung the head of Holofernes on the wall..." (RSVCE) See 2 Maccabees 15:35–37: "...he hung Nicanor's head from the citadel, a clear and conspicuous sign to every one of the help of the Lord.... And from that time the city has been in the possession of the Hebrews." (RSVCE) See Judith 16:25: "And no one ever again spread terror among the people of Israel in the days of Judith, or for a long time after her death." See Hasmoneans.); See Book of Jubilees	Sirach 1:1; Daniel 7:27; 1 Maccabees 15:10–14; 1 Maccabees 15:37–41; 1 Maccabees 16:1–10; 1 Maccabees 16:14–24; 2 Maccabees 1:1–9

=== Esther 11:1 – the 4th year of Ptolemy and Cleopatra as possibly 78–77 BCE ===
Before the Common Era (BCE)	Event	Bible texts
177 or 78–77	"The 4th year of the reign of Ptolemy and Cleopatra, Dositheus, who said that he was a priest and a Levite, and Ptolemy his son brought to Egypt the...Letter of Purim...": See above entry at "177 or 78–77 BCE"; See List of Old Testament Pseudepigrapha	Esther 11:1

=== 2 Maccabees 1:10–12 – Aristobulus II 66–63 BCE ===
Before the Common Era (BCE)	Event	Bible texts
66–63	"...To Aristobulus, (Note: Aristobulus II (son of Alexander Jannaeus [ruled 103–76 BCE] son of John Hyrcanus). It is unlikely that the earlier Aristobulus I is indicated, who imprisoned his mother, killed his brother, and ruled less than one year 104–103 BCE as ethnarch and high priest. Ant. 13:11:1–3 (§§ 301–317).) who is of the family of the anointed priests, teacher of Ptolemy the king...Having been saved by God out of grave dangers we thank him greatly for taking our side against the king. For he drove out those who fought against the holy city.": See Josephus, Antiquities of the Jews, Book 14, Chapters 2–4; 2 Maccabees 1:13–16 relates the death of Antiochus X Eusebes and his men, during the course of a military expedition, as locked inside the temple of Nanea in Persia, stoned to death and beheaded by the priests. (Note: Mahlon H. Smith states that Antiochus X Eusebes died fighting the Parthian Empire (which included Persian territory). See Antiochus X Eusebes: Mahlon H. Smith.) (This Antiochus should not be confused with the earlier Antiochus IV Epiphanes, who failed to take Elymais and its temple, and afterward died of parasitic infection and decay in the mountains of Persia. 1 Maccabees 6:1–16; 2 Maccabees 9:1–10, 28. (Note: Some scholars (The New American Bible for example) believe that the Antiochus referred to in this text of 2 Macc. 1:14 was Antiochus IV Epiphanes: "1, 14–17: A different account of the death of Antiochus IV is given in 2 Mc 9, 1–29 and another variant account in 1 Mc 6, 1–16. The writer of this letter [2 Macc. 1:10–2:18 one copy to Aristobulus in Jerusalem, one copy to the Jews in Egypt] probably heard a distorted rumor of the king's death. This fact and other indications show that the letter was written very soon after Antiochus IV died, hence in 164 BCE. —New American Bible, 2 Maccabees 1:14–17, footnote. As with the text of Daniel 11:45, a literalist interpretation of 2 Maccabees rejects the scholarly view of a "distorted rumor" in favor of an "inerrant" reading that takes the narrative as an accurate report, and therefore as not referring to the death of Antiochus IV Epiphanes, but to the actual death of another Antiochus who was slain by Parthians in the (Syrian) region of Persia/the Parthian Empire in the temple of Nanaya. The extra-biblical evidence cited by Mahlon H. Smith and others regarding the circumstances of the death of Antiochus X tends to support this literalist view, but this is currently a minority opinion.)); Pompey besieged Jerusalem, and took it (63 BCE). End of Jewish independence until 1948, with the Modern Israel State's declaration.	2 Maccabees 1:10–16

== See also ==
- Council of Jamnia
- Dating creation
- History of ancient Israel and Judah
- Intertestamental period
- Universal history
- Young Earth creationism
