= Ussher chronology =

17th-century chronology of the history of the world

Annals of the World; click to access PDF

Annales Veteris Testamenti Vol I (Latin); click to access PDF

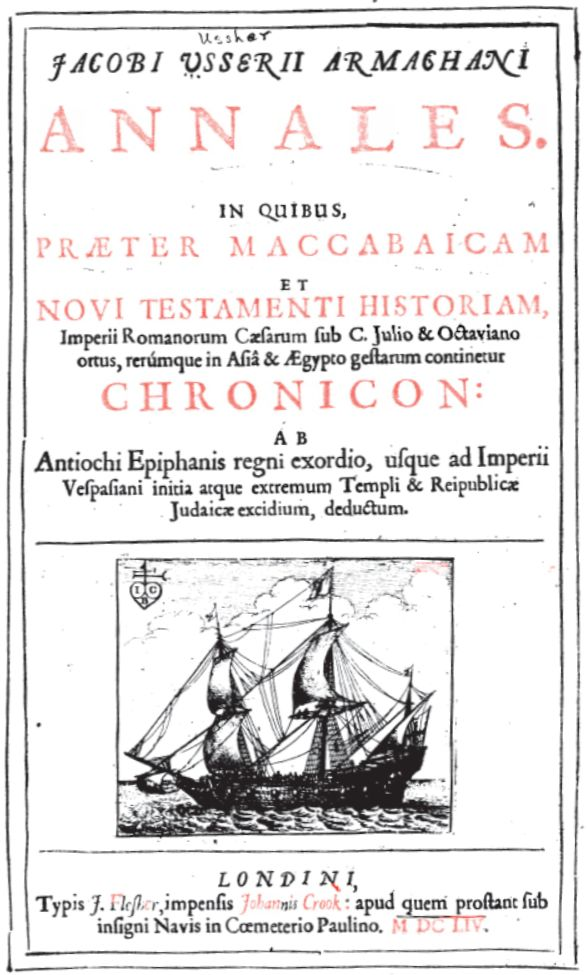
Annales Novi Testamenti Vol II (Latin); click to access PDF

The Ussher chronology is a seventeenth-century chronology of the history of the world formulated from a literal reading of the Old Testament by James Ussher, the Archbishop of Armagh and Primate of All Ireland. The chronology is sometimes associated with young Earth creationism, which holds that the universe was created only a few millennia ago by God as described in the first two chapters of the biblical book of Genesis. Ussher's work fell into disrepute in the 19th century.

Published in 1650, the full title of Ussher's work in Latin is Annales Veteris Testamenti, a prima mundi origine deducti, una cum rerum Asiaticarum et Aegyptiacarum chronico, a temporis historici principio usque ad Maccabaicorum initia producto (Annals of the Old Testament, deduced from the first origins of the world, the chronicle of Asiatic and Egyptian matters together produced from the beginning of historical time up to the beginnings of Maccabees). Ussher's work was his contribution to the long-running theological debate on the age of the Earth. This was a major concern of many Christian scholars over the centuries.

The chronology is sometimes called the Ussher–Lightfoot chronology because John Lightfoot published a similar chronology in 1642–1644; however, this is a misnomer, as the chronology is based on Ussher's work alone and not that of Lightfoot. Ussher deduced that the first day of creation was October 23, 4004 BC on the proleptic Julian calendar, near the autumnal equinox. Lightfoot similarly deduced that Creation began at nightfall near the autumnal equinox, but in the year 3929 BC.

== Proposed date of Creation ==
Ussher's proposed date of 4004 BC differed little from other biblically based estimates, such as those of Lightfoot, mentioned above, Jose ben Halafta (3761 BC), Bede (3952 BC), Ussher's near-contemporary Scaliger (3949 BC), Johannes Kepler (3992 BC),. Martin Luther (3960 BC) Ussher was influenced by the same account as the apocryphal Book of Jasher dating the worldwide flood to 2349 BC and the birth of Terah in 2127 BC. The date of 4000 BC as the creation of Adam was at least partially influenced by the widely held belief that the Earth was approximately 5600 years old (2000 from Adam to Abraham, 2000 from Abraham to the birth of Christ, and 1600 years from Christ to Ussher), corresponding to the six days of Creation, on the grounds that "one day is with the Lord as a thousand years, and a thousand years as one day" (2 Peter 3:8). This tradition was believed to indicate that Jesus would return in AD 2000, more than six thousand years after 4004 BC. Modern proponents of this interpretation hold that the creation date 4004 BC could be inaccurate.

== Ussher's methods ==
The chronologies of Ussher and other biblical scholars corresponded so closely because they used much the same method to calculate key events recorded in the Bible. Establishing the chronologies is complicated by the fact that the Bible was compiled by different authors over several centuries with lengthy chronological gaps, making it difficult to do a simple totaling of Biblical ages and dates. In his article on Ussher's calendar, James Barr has identified three distinct periods that Ussher and others had to tackle:

1. "Creation to Abraham's migration." This section is fairly easy to calculate, using the chronological data in Genesis 5 and 11, which gives an unbroken male lineage, with numbers of years, from the creation to Abraham being called out of Ur of the Chaldeans. Ussher used the chronology found in the Masoretic text instead of the alternative chronologies found in the Septuagint and Samaritan Pentateuch. Ussher fixed this period as 2082 years, from 4004 to 1922 BC.
2. "Abraham's migration to Solomon's temple." Ussher wrote that the time from Abraham leaving Haran to the Exodus was 430 years (based on Abraham's descendants suffering a period of 400 years of persecution, commencing 30 years after Abraham left Haran) 1 Kings 6 states that 480 years elapsed from the Exodus to the beginning of construction of Solomon's temple in the fourth year of Solomon's reign. Thus the temple foundations were laid 910 years after Abraham left Haran; these 910 years spanned from 1922 to 1012 BC.
3. "Period of the temple laid to the Babylonian captivity." This period is the most difficult to calculate, due to repeated difficulties in correlating the regnal years of the kingdoms of Judah and Israel. The simple addition of the reigns of Judah's kings results in a total of 430 years, but by positing a few overlapping reigns, Ussher shortened this to 424 years: 1012 to 588 BC.

After reckoning the years from creation to the last kings of Judah, Ussher used 2 Kings 25:27 to establish the length of time from the creation to the accession of Babylonian king Amel-Marduk. (Note: Amel-Marduk is also romanised in some Bible translations as Awel-Marduk or Evil-Merodach.) He then used information from Babylonian, Greek, and Roman sources to fix the date of Amel-Marduk's enthronement at 562 BC (after Nebuchadnezzar's death), from which he was able to deduce a creation in 4004 BC.

In fixing the date of Jesus' birth, Ussher took account of an error perpetrated by Dionysius Exiguus, the founder of the Anno Domini numbering system. Ussher chose 5 BC as Christ's birth year because Josephus indicated that the death of Herod the Great occurred in 4 BC. Thus, Jesus could not have been born after that date.

The season in which Creation occurred was the subject of considerable theological debate in Ussher's time. Many scholars proposed it had taken place in the spring, the start of the Babylonian, Chaldean and other cultures' chronologies. Others, including Ussher, thought it more likely that it had occurred in the autumn, largely because that season marked the beginning of the Jewish year.

Ussher further narrowed down the date by using the Jewish calendar to establish the "first day" of creation as falling on a Sunday near the autumnal equinox. The day of the week was a backward calculation from the six days of creation with God resting on the seventh, which in the Jewish calendar is Saturday—hence, Creation began on a Sunday. The astronomical tables that Ussher probably used were Kepler's Tabulae Rudolphinae (Rudolphine Tables, 1627). Using them, he would have concluded that the equinox occurred on Tuesday, October 25, only one day earlier than the traditional day of its creation, on the fourth day of Creation week, Wednesday, along with the Sun, Moon, and stars Genesis 1:16. Modern equations place the autumnal equinox of 4004 BC on Sunday, October 23 (by the Julian calendar).

Ussher's understanding of creation placed the first day referred to in Genesis 1:5 on October 23, but with a "pre-creation" event, which he identified as the "beginning of time" occurring the previous night. Ussher referred to his dating of creation on the first page of Annales in Latin and on the first page of its posthumous English translation Annals of the World (1658). In the following extract from the English translation, the phrase "in the year of the Julian Calendar" refers to the Julian Period, of which year 1 is 4713 BC, and therefore year 710 is 4004 BC.

In the beginning God created the heaven and the earth. Ge. 1:1 This beginning of time, according to our chronology, happened at the start of the evening preceding the 23rd day of October in the year of the Julian Calendar, 710.

Ussher provides a slightly different time in his "Epistle to the Reader" in his Latin and English works:

I deduce that the time from the creation until midnight, January 1, 1 AD was 4003 years, seventy days and six hours." Six hours before midnight would be 6 pm.

== Ussher's chronology today ==
By the middle of the nineteenth century, at least the early part of Ussher's chronology came under increasing attack from supporters of uniformitarianism, who argued that Ussher's "young Earth" was incompatible with the increasingly accepted view of an Earth much more ancient than Ussher's. It became generally accepted that the Earth was tens, perhaps even hundreds of millions of years old. Ussher fell into disrepute among theologians as well; in 1890, Princeton professor William Henry Green wrote a highly influential article in Bibliotheca Sacra entitled "Primeval Chronology" in which he strongly criticised Ussher. He concluded:

We conclude that the Scriptures furnish no data for a chronological computation prior to the life of Abraham; and that the Mosaic records do not fix and were not intended to fix the precise date either of the Flood or of the creation of the world.

The similarly conservative theologian B. B. Warfield reached the same conclusion in "On The Antiquity and Unity of the Human Race", commenting that "it is precarious in the highest degree to draw chronological inferences from genealogical tables".

Archbishop Ussher's chronology has been subject to artistic criticism: in the 1955 play Inherit the Wind (based on the Scopes Monkey Trial), and the fantasy novel Good Omens - which reports that 'One of his aides took the calculation further [but] this too was incorrect. By almost a quarter of an hour.'

A different viewpoint comes from Stephen Jay Gould, who, while totally disagreeing with Ussher's chronology, nevertheless wrote:

I shall be defending Ussher's chronology as an honorable effort for its time and arguing that our usual ridicule only records a lamentable small-mindedness based on mistaken use of present criteria to judge a distant and different past. Ussher represented the best of scholarship in his time. He was part of a substantial research tradition, a large community of intellectuals working toward a common goal under an accepted methodology.

== See also ==
- Chronology of the Bible
- Anno Mundi – Calendar era based on the biblical account of creation
- Anno Lucis – Dating system used in Freemasonry
- Martin Anstey
