= Sobekemsaf =

sbk m V16 f
Sobekemsaf
in hieroglyphs
Era: 2nd Intermediate Period
(1650–1550 BC)

Sobekemsaf (sbk-m-z3=f; “Sobek is his protection”) is an ancient Egyptian theophoric name, popular during the Second Intermediate Period (mainly in the 17th Dynasty). Although it is grammatically masculine, it was also used for women; it was common during this era that the gender of a name did not correspond to that of its bearer.

== Notable bearers ==
- Pharaoh Sobekemsaf I
- Pharaoh Sobekemsaf II
- official of the 13th Dynasty Sobekemsaf
- Queen Sobekemsaf, wife of Nubkheperre Intef
- Princess Sobekemsaf C, daughter of Queen Sobekemsaf
- [Sobek?]emsaf A, mother of Pharaoh Rahotep
