= Avner Cohen =

Israeli-American academic

- אבנר כהן
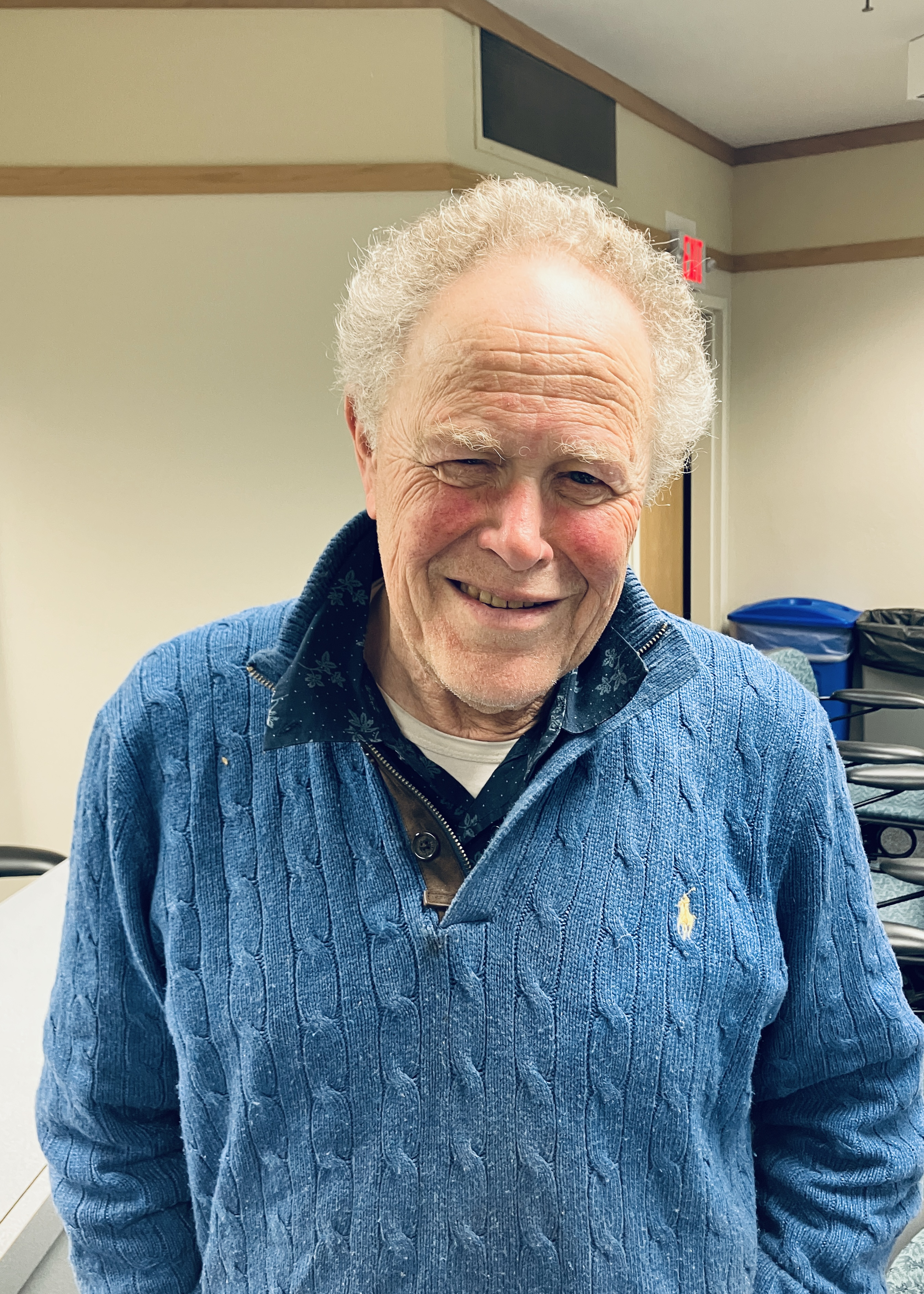
- Born: 1951 (age 74–75)
- Occupations: Professor and Senior Research Fellow

Academic background
- Education: Tel Aviv University; York University; University of Chicago
- Doctoral advisor: Stephen Toulmin

Academic work
- Discipline: Historical, philosophical, and policy of issues related to the nuclear age
- Institutions: Washington University; Ben-Gurion University; Tel Aviv University; Hobart and William Smith; Middlebury College
- Notable works: Israel and the Bomb, 1998 & The Worst-Kept Secret, 2010
- Website: www.nonproliferation.org/experts/avner-cohen/

Avner Cohen (Hebrew: אבנר כהן; born 1951) is an Israeli-American writer, historian, and professor. He is a prominent figure in the nonproliferation and nuclear history academic communities, well known for his works on Israel's nuclear history and global nuclear history. He is currently a professor at the Nonproliferation and Terrorism Studies (NPTS) Program at the Middlebury Institute of International Studies, where he also serves as a senior affiliate at the James Martin Center for Nonproliferation Studies.

== Early life and education ==
Cohen grew up north of Tel Aviv in Ramat HaSharon. He received a B.A. in philosophy and history from Tel Aviv University in 1975. He then studied philosophy at York University where he received his M.A. in philosophy in 1977. Four years later, in 1981, he earned his Ph.D. from the University of Chicago. His dissertation advisor was Stephen Toulmin.

== Career ==
His early academic career started at Washington University in St. Louis (philosophy, 1981–1982), then at Ben-Gurion University of the Negev (philosophy, 1982–1984), Tel Aviv University (1983–1990), and Hobart and William Smith Colleges (1986–1987).

Cohen started his work on nuclear weapons issues in the early 1980s from the perspective of a philosopher exploring the dilemmas of the nuclear age: acquisition, deterrence, and proliferation. It was motivated by the anti-nuclear protest of the early 1980s. Much of his early work, in the early-mid 1980s, focused on the moral dilemmas of the nuclear age. It was only in the mid-late 1980s, in part in the wake of the 1986 Vanunu Affair, that Cohen started to be intrigued by the peculiarities of the unique Israeli nuclear predicament.

During Cohen's research fellowship in 1987–1988 at the Center of Science and International Affairs (CSIA, now renamed the Belfer Center) of the Kennedy School of Government at Harvard, he developed and coined (in collaboration with Benjamin Frankel) the concept of "opaque proliferation", originally conceptualized as a generic reference to the features of second-generation clear proliferation (the cases of Israel, India, Pakistan, and South Africa).

Cohen previously held research and fellowship positions at Massachusetts Institute of Technology, the Kennedy School of Government at Harvard, the Center for International and Security Studies at Maryland (CISSM), the National Security Archive, the Woodrow Wilson International Center for Scholars, the Jennings Randolph Program for International Peace (USIP), and the American Academy of Arts and Sciences.

In 1990, after he was awarded the MacArthur Foundation Research and Writing grant, Cohen resigned his position at Tel Aviv University and took a research position at the Center of International Studies at MIT. With physicist Dr. Marvin Miller as a partner, they initiated a new project aimed to study the nuclear issue in the Middle East. Cohen's seminal work, Israel and the Bomb, which chronicled the political history of the Israeli nuclear program, was researched and written while he was at MIT. While researching for the book, Cohen encountered a series of confrontations with the Israeli security apparatus that ultimately resulted in an unprecedented criminal investigation against him. This unprecedented decade-long struggle over the research and publication of Israel and the Bomb is detailed in the following section.

In 1997, Cohen left MIT to become a Jennings Senior Fellow at the United States Institute of Peace. In the following years, he held a series of short-term research positions with the National Security Archive, the Center for International and Security Studies at the University of Maryland (CISSM), the Woodrow Wilson Center, and the Center for Nonproliferation Studies (CNS). Cohen also taught at the George Washington University (adjunct 2001–04), the Hebrew University of Jerusalem (visiting professor, 2004) and the University of Haifa (visiting professor, 2005). Since 2011, Cohen has been a professor at MIIS.

Dr. Cohen is a member of the Editorial Board of the Nonproliferation Review, a fellow and contributing editor to many Electronic Briefing Books at the National Security Archive at the George Washington University, and the owner of the "Avner Cohen Collection" at the Digital Archive of the Woodrow Wilson Center. He is also a regular contributor to Israel's daily, Haaretz.

== Research ==
Dr. Cohen has authored and edited eight books. Some of his books have been translated in Hebrew, French, and Persian (an illegal publication). Cohen was also the co-editor of two special-issues of academic journals in 2018 and 2019. He co-edited more than half a dozen Electronic Briefing Books with Dr. William Burr of the National Security Archive, all posted on the Archive's website. Cohen has authored nearly one hundred academic items, including journal articles, book chapters, and others.

During the research for Israel and the Bomb, Cohen conducted tens of taped historical interviews with key individuals who were involved in the Israeli nuclear program. The transcripts of some of these interviews – including Bertrand Goldschmidt, Yitzhak "Ya'tza" Yaakov, Arnan "Sini" Azaryahu, Avraham Hermoni, Edwin E. Kintner, Elie Geisler, Myer Feldman, and Walt Rostow – are now part of the "Avner Cohen Collection" and were posted with annotation in the Digital Archive of the Woodrow Wilson Center.

Some of the distinct historical insights of Israel and the Bomb include:

- The exact circumstances of the Dimona site discovery in 1959–1960.
- The details of the exchanges between John F. Kennedy and David Ben-Gurion and Levi Eshkol on nuclear issues, and the possible connection between Kennedy's pressure on the nuclear issue and Ben-Gurion's eventual resignation.
- Details of how US visits to Dimona were conducted (1964–1969) and how Israel was able to conceal its real purpose, preventing US discovery.
- Intricate relations between various US government auxiliaries in the effort to decode the Dimona project, and US intelligence failures. The CIA ultimately understood Israel's ambitions in an approximate sense.
- The cat-and-mouse U.S.-Israeli game over the Dimona project throughout the 1960s.
- Details on the series of exchanges over the Israeli nuclear issue between US Assistant Secretary of Defense, Paul Warnke, and Israeli Ambassador in the United States, Yitzhak Rabin, also known as the Warnke-Rabin exchange.
- The secret birth of nuclear opacity as a symbiotic American-Israeli bargain under President Richard Nixon and Prime Minister Golda Meir in 1969–70 (the issue is elaborated further in Cohen's 2010 book, The Worst-Kept Secret)

== The Struggle Over Israel and the Bomb ==
The preliminary work that would eventually become Israel and the Bomb began in 1991–1992, shortly after Cohen's arrival at MIT. Traveling back and forth from the United States and Israel to conduct historical interviews on the formative years of the Israeli nuclear program, Cohen was eventually confronted by auxiliaries of the Israeli Military Censor.

In the revised introduction to the French edition of Israel and the Bomb (2020) and in a lengthy interview with the Atomic Heritage Foundation, Cohen describes the complex tale of the struggle over the publication of Israel and the Bomb. He states, "…to do work on the Israeli case was not a simple thing. I had to struggle and to address very powerful forces that did not want the story to be out…some top bureaucrats." Cohen initially (1993) submitted a short manuscript, the precursory document of Israel and the Bomb, to the Israeli Military Censor. After rounds of back-and-forth disputes about what details could have posed a breach of security, Cohen eventually filed a formal petition (BAGATZ) in 1994 with the Israeli Supreme Court against the Israeli Chief Military censor, Brig. General Yitzhak Shani, and Israel's Minister of Defense, Yitzhak Rabin. The Supreme Court had one closed-door session on the case in September 1994, in which at its end the three justices pleaded both sides to find a compromise.

The two main Israeli security institutions that were opposing the research and publication of Cohen's work were the Military Censor, known in Israel as the censora, and the Office of Security of the Defense Establishment, also known by its Hebrew acronym, MALMAB. In 1995, Cohen eventually withdrew his Supreme Court BAGATZ as it became evident that no practical compromise was acceptable to the security establishment, concerned that a verdict striking down the manuscript could have set a dangerous legal precedent and may have decreased the likelihood of eventual publication of the work. Cohen continued working on his research at MIT, determined to publish it as a book in the United States. The English edition was ultimately published in 1998 by Columbia University Press, and soon after Israeli publisher Schocken Publishing House purchased the rights to publish the book in Hebrew in Israel.

Meanwhile in Israel, the security chief of MALMAB, Yechiel Horev, was building a case against Cohen, insisting that he should be arrested and stand trial if he returned to Israel. It has been suggested that Horev raised the Cohen case with at least four prime ministers: Yitzhak Rabin, Benjamin Netanyahu, Ehud Barak, and Ariel Sharon, claiming that Israel and the Bomb signified a direct affront to Israel's policy of nuclear opacity, and therefore the state must take legal action against Cohen.

In early 2001, Cohen was invited by the Israeli Society for History and Philosophy of Science to deliver the keynote speech at its annual meeting in Jerusalem. Unsure of what might transpire upon his arrival, Cohen decided to accept the invitation and face the challenge of a criminal investigation, risking a possibility of arrest and trial. Despite warning, Cohen was not detained at the Ben Gurion Airport upon his arrival in March, 2001, as had happened on a previous trip, but was summoned to face a criminal investigation, conducted by both MALMAB and the Israeli police, regarding whether the publication of Israel and the Bomb in the United States was indeed a violation of Israel's national security laws, especially Israeli Espionage act(113/c). That investigation included nearly 60 hours of interrogation in March and April 2001. In 2004, the case against him was officially closed.

Because the research for the book was based, in part, on hundreds of oral interviews – with Israeli, American, French and Norwegian sources – some of the book's contents were never in the public domain before. In his 2020 introduction to the French edition of Israel and the Bomb, Cohen adds that "…the writing of the book was not just the intellectual issue of doing history, but it was also struggling with institutions and forces who were committed to do their best not to let the story come out."

The book's 1998 (American) publication was notable, perhaps unprecedented, because it was the first time in Israel's history when a product of legitimate academic historical research that had been banned in its entirety by an administrative ruling of the Israeli military censor was defied and published in the United States. Once the book was published in the United States, the Israeli Military Censor had no mandate to ban its Hebrew translation. It was also the first time in Israel's history that a criminal investigation was initiated for alleged espionage charges against a legitimate academic researcher who had never been a government employee. Cohen attributes the extreme conduct to Israel's interest in preserving its biggest national taboo – its nuclear program. Specifically, the Israeli security authorities saw this book as a direct threat against the country's untouched policy of nuclear opacity which relies heavily on that national taboo.

Comprehensive accountings of the struggle against the censor are available in the French edition of Israel and the Bomb, in a C-SPAN interview, and the aforementioned Atomic Heritage Foundation interview.

== Views ==
Cohen has been a critical voice of what he considers Benjamin Netanyahu's deployment of the Holocaust for political ends. His various op-eds reveal a deep concern over the state of Israeli democracy under the Netanyahu government, citing a hubristic mishandling of the Joint Comprehensive Plan of Action (Iran nuclear deal) and a refusal to take responsibility for what Cohen calls "the recklessness that led to Hamas' massacre" on October 7, 2023. Cohen actively publishes op-eds regarding the conflict and its implications.

In other previous publications, Cohen has expressed his opinion that the policy of nuclear opacity that Israel has pursued for decades is anachronistic and utterly undemocratic, and "created an ignorant, cowardly public, a public that in a certain sense betrayed its democratic civic duties," and that "it is not possible to maintain healthy processes of making decisions in democracy, or beware of groupthink failures, while committing to ambiguity." At the same time, Cohen recognizes that the political success of this policy, via American long-held support, along with its domestic support, makes it practically difficult to revise anytime soon. Cohen develops his views on the policy of opacity, or amimut, in his 2010 book The Worst-Kept Secret: Israel's Bargain with the Bomb (Columbia University Press).

As an historian, Cohen maintains, and has written about using historical evidence, that Israel has reached the nuclear threshold on the eve of the 1967 Six-Day War. He draws comparisons from this event to contemporary issues regarding the Iranian nuclear program.

== Appearances in Media ==
Cohen is commonly referred to as the leading historian on the Israeli nuclear program, and as such he has often contributed in media as a content advisor. He has appeared in many documentaries such as BBC's "Israel, Vanunu, and the Bomb", PBS's "A Nuclear Requiem", and various other historical productions by academic institutions. Many of his historical interviews are archived and are accessible on the Wilson Center digital archive, and some of his CNS interview and discussion panels are available on the CNS website and on YouTube. Recently, Cohen has become a regular contributor on the largest Indian English TV network, WION.

== Awards ==
Cohen received the MacArthur Foundation research and writing award twice, first in 1990 and second in 2004.

== Op-Eds and Other Media Publications ==
Since the 1980s, Cohen has published extensively in well-known global media outlets such as The New York Times, The Washington Post, Los Angeles Times, The Boston Globe, The Jerusalem Post, The Washington Times, Haaretz, The Jerusalem Report, and Yedioth Ahronoth. Cohen has written hundreds of journal articles, book chapters, op-eds, and magazine articles over his career.

== Reception ==
Israel and the Bomb:

"A scholarly treatise that includes over 1,200 footnotes, yet reads like a novel.... [Cohen] analyzes in rich detail how this policy of 'nuclear opacity' evolved and what made it possible." – Lawrence Kolb, New York Times Book Review "Cohen's work will necessitate the rewriting of Israel's history, wars, international relations, domestic political crises, economy, psychology, national pride--everything will have to be viewed in a different light." – Tom Segev, Ha'aretz

"... Avner Cohen's book stands in a class of its own. It is the first scholarly study of the history of this project, it is richly documented, and it unveils some of the major mysteries surrounding events by tapping a large body of previously untouched sources.... It can only be assumed that when this national mood of 'nuclear' ignorance changes, Cohen's book will serve as a solid foundation for this debate." – Uri Bar-Joseph, Jewish History

The Worst Kept Secret: Israel's Bargain with the Bomb:

"Cohen's second outstanding book on Israel's nuclear project, and the veil of ambiguity that has swathed it from inception, provides a richly detailed account of its history and a provocative analysis of its future. Cohen shows how Israel's beleaguered national existence and persistent Holocaust memories led to the taboo on any acknowledgment of its nuclear weapons program, which cannot, in his view, any longer serve Israel's interests. This is a splendid work of historical research as well as a thought-provoking challenge for both current and future Israeli and American policymakers." – Samuel W. Lewis, U.S. Ambassador to Israel, 1977–1985

"This important book should be read by anyone interested in understanding the changes that Israel will need to make in its nuclear program as the world reduces reliance on nuclear weapons. Cohen makes a compelling case for why it is in Israeli's interest to confirm its nuclear weapons program and participate in efforts to reduce reliance on nuclear weapons." – Morton Halperin, senior advisor, Open Society Institute

== Works ==
- Doubt, Anxiety, and Salvation: A Study of Metaphilosophical and Psychological Themes in the History of Scepticism. 1981. (Ph.D. thesis in The Committee on History of Culture, the University of Chicago)
- The Nuclear Age: A Chapter in Moral History (in Hebrew). Tel Aviv: Ministry of Defense. 1989.
- Nuclear shadows in the Middle East : prospects for arms control in the wake of the Gulf Crisis. Cambridge, Mass: Defense and Arms Control Studies Program, Center for International Studies, Massachusetts Institute of Technology. 1990. (with Marvin Miller)
- Israel and the Bomb. New York: Columbia University Press. 1998. ISBN 0-231-10482-0.
- Israel's Last Taboo (in Hebrew). Tel Aviv: Kinneret Zmora-Bitan Dvir Publishing House. 2005.
- The Worst-Kept Secret: Israel's Bargain with the Bomb. New York: Columbia University Press. 2010. ISBN 978-0-231-13698-3.
- Israël et la bombe: L'histoire du nucléaire israélien. Paris: Editions Demi Lune. 2020. ISBN 9782917112489.

Co-Edited Books and Special Edition Journals:

- Nuclear Weapons and the Future of Humanity: The Fundamental Questions (Co-edited with Steven Lee. Totowa, NJ: Rowman & Allanheld. 1986.
- Humanity Under the Shadow of the Bomb (in Hebrew). Tev Aviv: Hakibbutz Ha-meuchad Publishing House. 1987.
- The Institution of Philosophy: a Discipline in Crisis? (Co-edited with Marcelo Dascal). La Salle, Ill: Open Court. 1989. ISBN 9780812690934. (with Marcelo Dascal) (reprint ISBN 978-0-8126-9094-1)
- Rublee, Maria Rost; Cohen, Avner (2018). "Nuclear Norms in Global Governance: A Progressive Research Agenda". Contemporary Security Policy. 39 (3): 317–340. doi:10.1080/13523260.2018.1451428.
- Nuclear Dimensions of the 1967 Arab-Israeli War. The Nonproliferation Review. 2018. doi:10.1080/10736700.2018.1605042.
