= Azaria (surname) =

Azaria is a surname. Notable people with the surname include:

- Alexandre Azaria (born 1967), French composer, songwriter, and musician
- Aristaces Azaria (1782–1854), Armenian Catholic abbot and archbishop
- Aviv Azaria (born 1991), Israeli footballer
- Death of Azaria Chamberlain, an Australian baby girl who was killed by a dingo on the night of 17 August 1980
  The Disappearance of Azaria Chamberlain, Australian TV movie about the Azaria Chamberlain case
- Eitan Azaria (born 1983), Israeli retired footballer and Football Mental Consultant
- Elor Azaria, Israeli soldier
- Hank Azaria (born 1964), American actor, voice actor, comedian, and producer
- Nati Azaria (born 1967), Israeli footballer
- Rachel Azaria (born 1977), Israeli politician

== See also ==
- Azaria, a moshav in central Israel
- Azria (surname)
- Azariah (disambiguation)
- Azarian (surname)
- Azaryan (surname)
- Azarias (given name)
