= Azariahu =

Azariahu or Azariahu (Hebrew: עזריהו) is a Hebrew surname. Notable people with the surname include:

- Arnan Azaryahu
- Sarah Azariahu, Zionist and feminist educator in pre-state Israel
- Yosef Azariahu (1873–1945), Zionist activist, educator, and writer

== See also ==
- Azariah
