= Sarah Azariahu =

Zionist and feminist educator in pre-state Israel

- שרה עזריהו
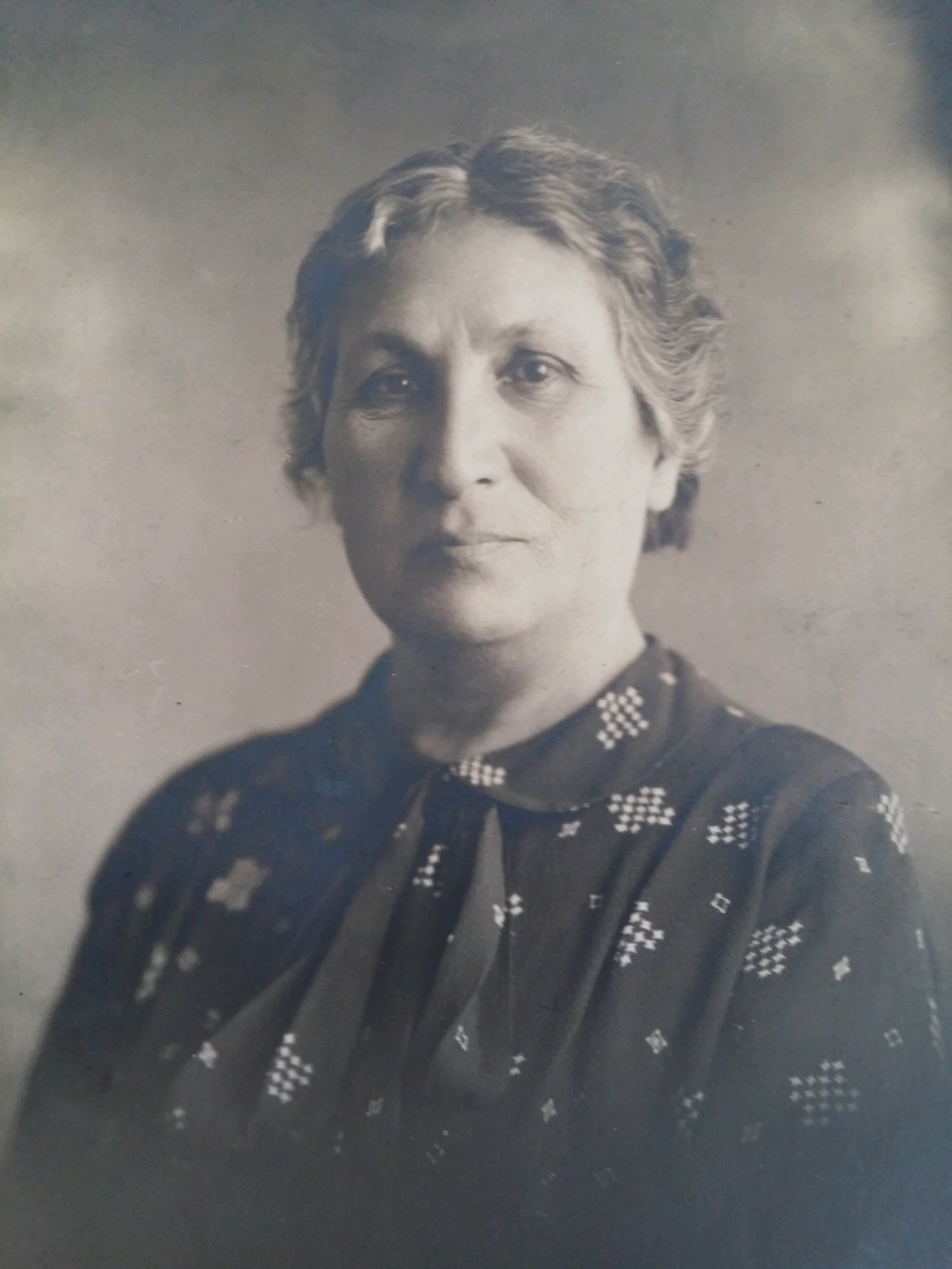
- Born: 17 July 1873; Daugavpils
- Died: 22 October 1962 (aged 89); Afikim
- Occupation: teacher
- Spouse: Yosef Ozerkowsky (later Azaryahu)

Sara Azaryahu or Sarah Azariahu; Hebrew: שרה עזריהו; Sarah Azaryahu; Sarah Meirov; Sarah Ozrakovski (17 July 1873 – 22 October 1962) was a Latvian-born Zionist, elected political official, and feminist educator in pre-state Israel.

== Early life ==
Azariahu was born in 1873 in Daugavpils (then known as Dvinsk and Dinaburg) which was then part of Russia and is today part of Latvia. Her parents were Bluma (born Eisenstein) and Shmaryahu Meirov. Her grandfather was the Chief Rabbi of the city, Aharon Shaul Zelig Gurion-Meirov. She learned Russian, German and French. She was taught Hebrew, the first prophets and about Judaism with a private teacher as the public schools would require violating the Sabbath, and she attended a gymnasium.

At this time, the Russian Enlightenment was spreading through the Jewish youth of Russia. Through this, Azariahu became familiar with revolutionary Russian literature, making contact with the Bund movement and spreading Russian language among Jewish Yeshiva students. Ultimately, her attachment to Zionism and Zionist ideology kept her away from fully subscribing to the Bund movement. In her writings, she noted that she was greatly influenced by Ahad Ha'am, Yehuda Leib Pinsker, Moshe Leib Lilienblum, and others. Following a wave of Pogroms in the Russian Empire in the 1880s, her attachment to Zionism grew stronger.

== Studies ==
In 1893 at the age of 20, Azariahu had to quit school to care for her younger sister for three years. In 1899 she became qualified to teach, and a year later decided to fulfill her dream to study at university. At this time it was becoming possible for women to study in Saint Petersburg, even if they were Jewish, if they had a resident's permit. Azariahu decided to lodge with friends in the city and to attend one of the new girl's medical schools. As she was nearing the end of her studies, due to putting her friends at risk and rising antisemitism she decided to leave school. This pushed her to move to Warsaw as it had a larger Jewish community. There, she worked as a substitute teacher at a Jewish school of Y. Ravitz.

== Zionist work ==
=== Daughters of Zion ===
In the early 1890s, Azariahu began to get more connected to Zionists in Dinaburg, but did not find a common ground with the movement's businessmen in the city. In 1892, with a friend, she began to add women to the national movement, founding the "Daughters of Zion" Union. The group was engaged in studying Israel's history and culture, providing news about what was happening in Israel and spreading Hebrew language.

When Theodor Herzl founded the Zionist movement, Azariahu was impressed by, her perception of, his progressive attitude towards women. In her memoir, Azariahu notes that she had been troubled by two major issues: the inferior status of the Jewish people, and the inferior status of women. She believed that the solution for both of these problems could be found in Israel.

=== First visit to Israel ===
In 1897, Azariahu took her first visit to Israel, then Ottoman Palestine, with her sister who was sick from Malaria. She stayed there for two months. There, she was surprised to find a flourishing society in the Jewish colonies, noting:

"Well, there really is a Jewish settlement in Israel and not just in letters. And there are living and existing Jewish workers sitting in their vineyards and gardens ... The first meeting with the reality of the Jewish village shook every fiber of my soul ... and standing by the open window in the stillness of the Israeli night, I devoted myself entirely to the experience of the first contact with the buds of the new Jewish life on the land of our ancestors."

There, Azariahu began to focus on the importance of women's economic independence. In her book, she noted that financial independence is essential for women to improve their situation for themselves, their families, and to advance in public life.

=== Fifth Zionist Conference ===
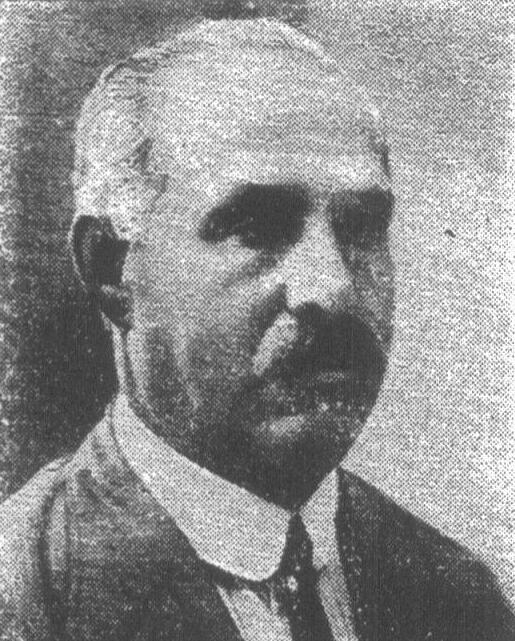
Yosef Azariahu

In 1901, she married Yosef Ozerkowsky (later Yosef Azariahu) and they both went to Switzerland where they studied education. The couple participated in the fifth Zionist conference held in Basel as delegates. There, she advocated that the Zionist movement would operate on a broad scale and adopt popular and democratic foundations, especially in the fields of education and culture. Azariahu took part in the debates on the new statute for the Zionist Organization, and the establishment of a fund to start buying land in Israel. After the congress, due to financial troubles, the couple returned to Russia and settled in Golta (now part of Pervomaisk, Ukraine), where she taught a Hebrew school for girls.

=== Immigration to Israel ===
In 1905, Yosef moved to Rehovot, Israel teaching in the settlement. Azariahu waited to finish out the school year in Russia and in 1906, with their eldest son Yaakov (then four years old), joined him. In preparing to leave she was stopped by Russian law stating that a married woman is not allowed to leave without her husband's official consent. Yosef, already in Israel, was refused by the Russian consul to sign the approval documents. Following the Russian Revolution of 1905, severe riots broke out in Southern Russia and Goleta where they were living. Despite the danger, Azariahu went to Kherson, and from there to Odesa to speed up the immigration process. After several weeks, they were able to sail to Israel.

She saw her immigration to Israel as a revolutionary act writing in her memoir:

"Here under these skies I was born and also grew up ... However, now my heart and soul are subject to another "revolution" ... I am going to join a small group of passionate and brave revolutionaries, who are already sitting and working in our ancient homeland, and like them I am now burning behind me all the bridges that once connected me to this country."

The couple taught at a school for girls in Jaffa, where men and women earned equal pay. Azariahu taught mathematics and geography, traditionally seen as a masculine role.

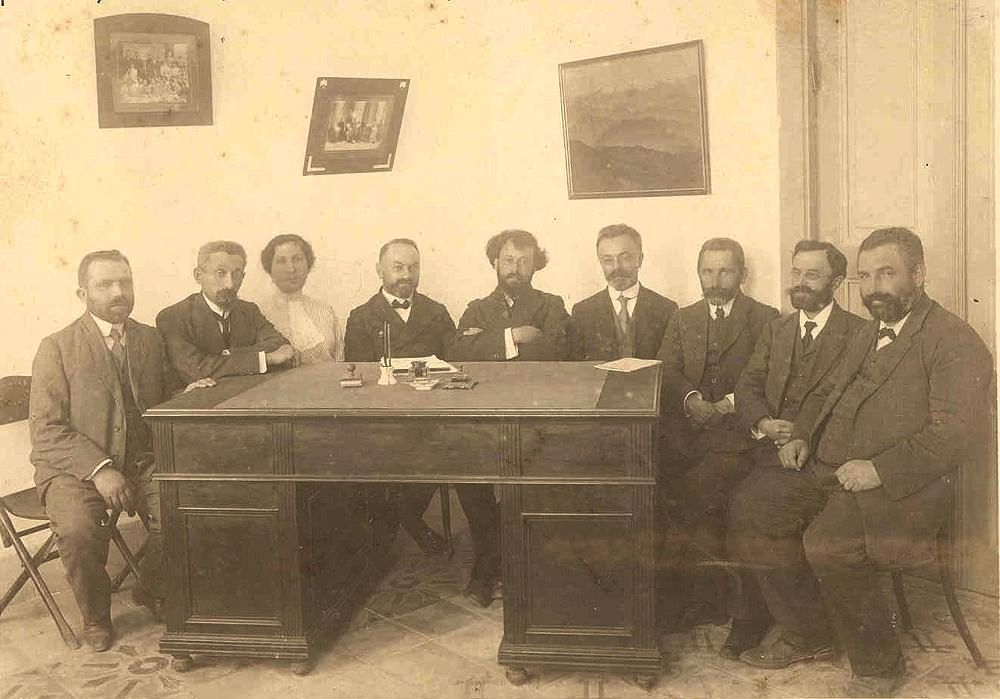
Azariahu (third from left) at the meeting of the supervisory committee of the girls' school in Neve Tzedek, 1913.

In 1909, through the land lottery, they were one of 66 founding families that would become the Tel Aviv-Yafo Municipality. Their house was at 14 Aham Ha'am Street, until 1943 when it was sold to pay off debts.

== The fight for women's rights ==
=== Women's suffrage in Haifa ===
During World War I, the family moved to Haifa. Azariahu was a teacher and Yosef was the Director of the Reali School (the permanent director Arthur Biram was drafted into the army). Again Azariahu waited to finish the school year in Jaffa, joining her husband about a year later in the summer of 1915.

Once in Haifa, Azariahu joined the right for women's right to vote for the city community committee. She declared:

"We, the women of the last immigration which has been going on for over 30 years, did not come here as 'pleasant' creatures, but as daughters of the people who wanted to fulfill the national duty that fate has imposed on this generation. We are ready and willing to do any hard and arduous work and we do not hesitate. Of all the sacrifices that the cruel conditions of our lives here will demand from us ... in this house, for the restoration of which we came to Israel, freedom and equality will prevail for all its citizens and residents, for men and women alike. As loyal partners in the duties that we strive to fulfill with all our hearts and minds, we women demand our share equal to that of the man also has rights. We demand the right to vote actively and passively for all the elected institutions of the settlement."

Azariahu and the women's suffrage movement faced harsh criticism. She noted:

"The attitude of rejection and disdain towards the Jewish woman who immigrated to Israel out of a sincere aspiration to give all her strength to the building of the renewed homeland fell on me like a blow. Feelings of rebellion against the deprivation of women's rights that filled my heart since the days of my youth ... reawakened in my soul in the face of the threat to discriminate against women in our country; It is these feelings that drive me to revolt and act against any reduction in the civil and political rights of women in the Land of Israel."

Ultimately, the women of Haifa obtained the right to vote.

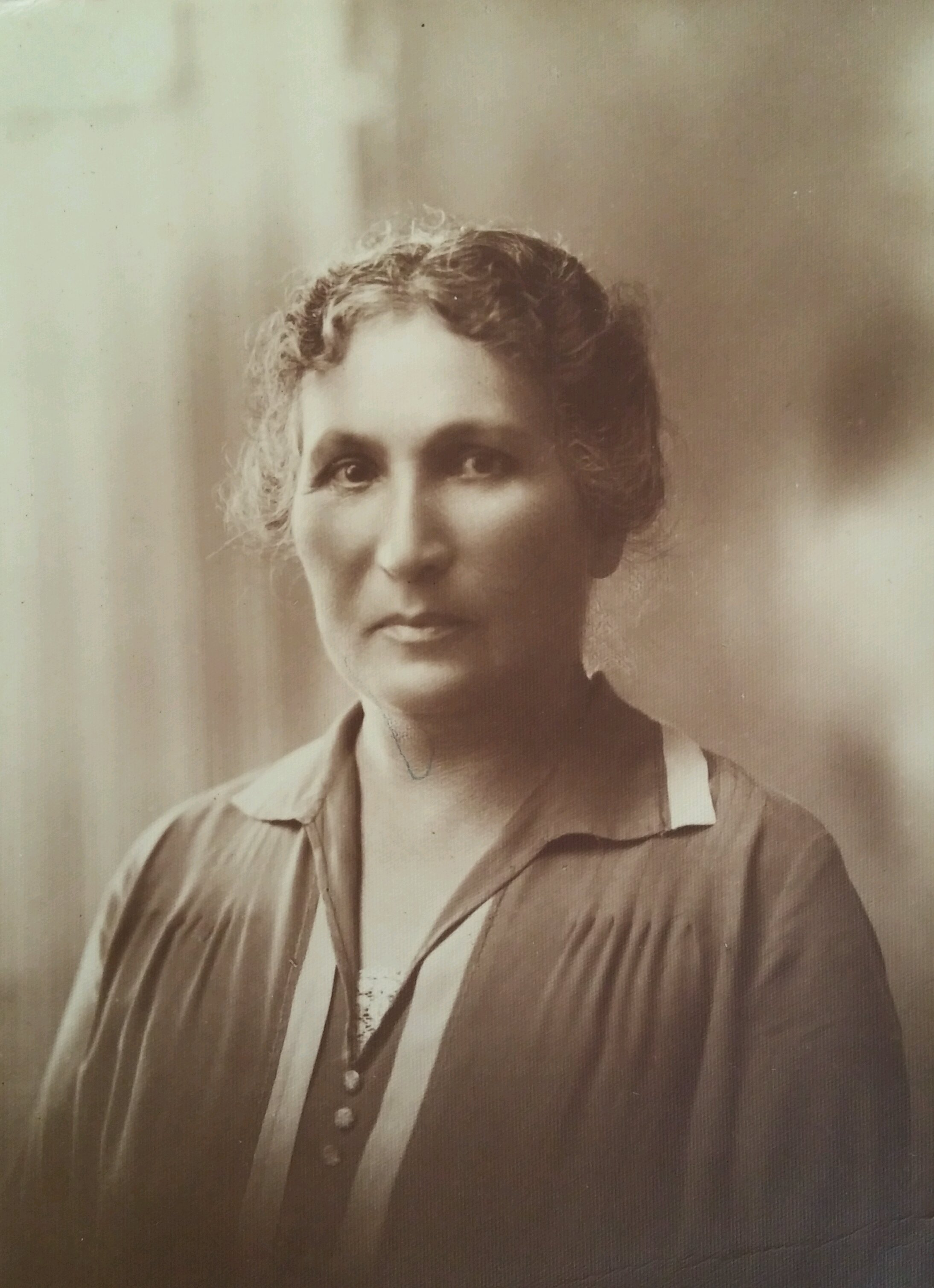
Azariahu, 1928

=== Union of Hebrew Women for Equal Rights in Eretz Israel ===
In 1919 the family moved to Jerusalem. There, Azariahu ran the girls' school and Yosef was appointed Supervisor of all schools in Jerusalem. There, Azariahu was one of the founders and leaders of the Union of Hebrew Women for Equal Rights in Eretz Israel. She then began to fight for women's right to vote for the settlement's elected assembly, particularly against the ultra-orthodox community attempting to exclude women from civil and political life.

In what Azariahu described as a "unique ploy without precedent in women's movements in other countries," the women's union established an independent campaign ticket to contest the elections for the elected assembly.

The union stressed that their goal was not only the right to vote, but overall equality of rights. In 1920, the Union joined the International Alliance of Women, an international alliance of women's unions, headquartered in London and including 53 other countries.

=== Assembly of Representatives ===
On the one-year anniversary of the union, Azariahu was elected to the first committee, managing daily activities of the organization with Rosa Welt-Straus, Miriam Nofach, Penia Matman-Cohen, and Hasia Feinsud Suknik. Azariahu was elected Secretary of the organization and was a leading figure for the Union on the national stage.

Elections were held in the settlement on April 19, 1920, following a strong campaign by the union. Seven women were elected to the first elected assembly, including Azariahu. She was chosen to sit in the honorary secretariat of the first session of the assembly but, as her presence as a woman bothered the ultra-Orthodox representatives, all honorary secretaries were asked to leave the stage. In the following assemblies, she ran on the Women for Equal Rights ticket.

In 1925, Azariahu participated in the second session of the Assembly of Representatives, and was a member of the National Committee dedicated to implementing the decisions of the Assembly of Representatives. In this role, she devoted time to the fight against discrimination against women in family matters including inheritance and guardianship. On her election she noted:

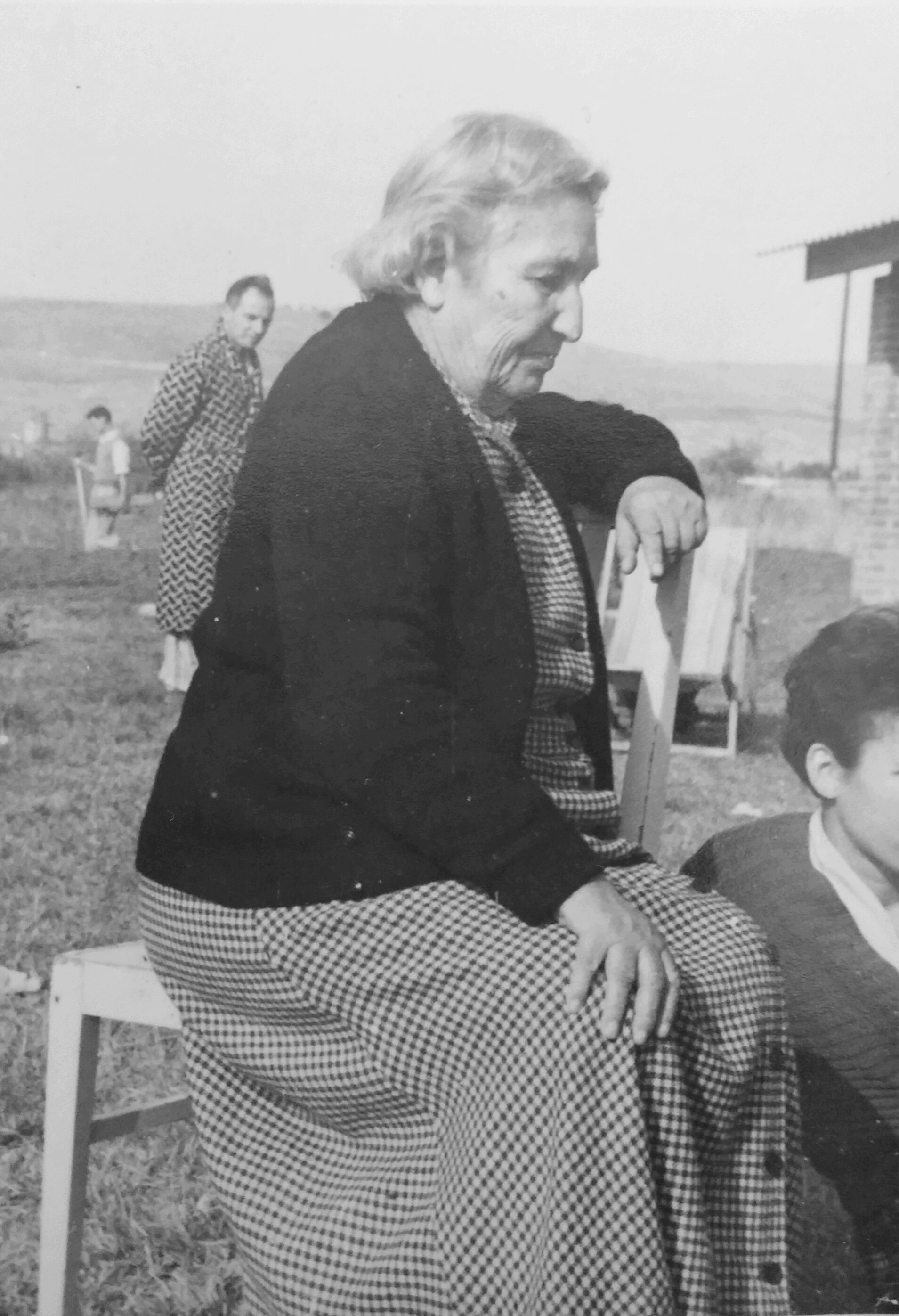
Azariahu, 1956

"I remember very well the elation that filled my whole being when I crossed the threshold of the hall where the second assembly of elected representatives was convened. With a light heart, I took my place among the delegates, as an equal among equals and from an inner feeling that in the future no one within these walls will have the pleasure of casting an improper and reprehensible right to my participation in this institution. In my soul, the sharpness of the recognition that one of the stormy and urgent episodes in the war of the Hebrew woman for her equal rights has ended. The woman rightfully occupied her place in the highest institution of the settlement and under conditions equal to those of the man. This big and important chapter has been completed."

=== Legal battles for Women's Rights ===
In conjunction and following her work in the Assembly of Representatives, she continued to fight for rights for women. For a decade she worked in the Union's legal offices, defending rights of married women and their children in cases of family conflict. She also served as a "lawyer for women" which included representing women in Rabbinical Court. She worked to establish secular courts in Israel because she opposed the fact that only men had rights in Rabbinical Courts.

=== Child marriage and bigamy ===
Azariahu fought against child marriage, something she was exposed to as an educator many times. Through the Union, she worked to enact a law establishing a minimum age for marriage. She frequently spoke about this issue on the Assembly of Representatives, particularly in light of the frequency of this practice in the Yemenite Jewish community.

In 1930 she served as a judge of the Hebrew Peace Court.

== Family ==
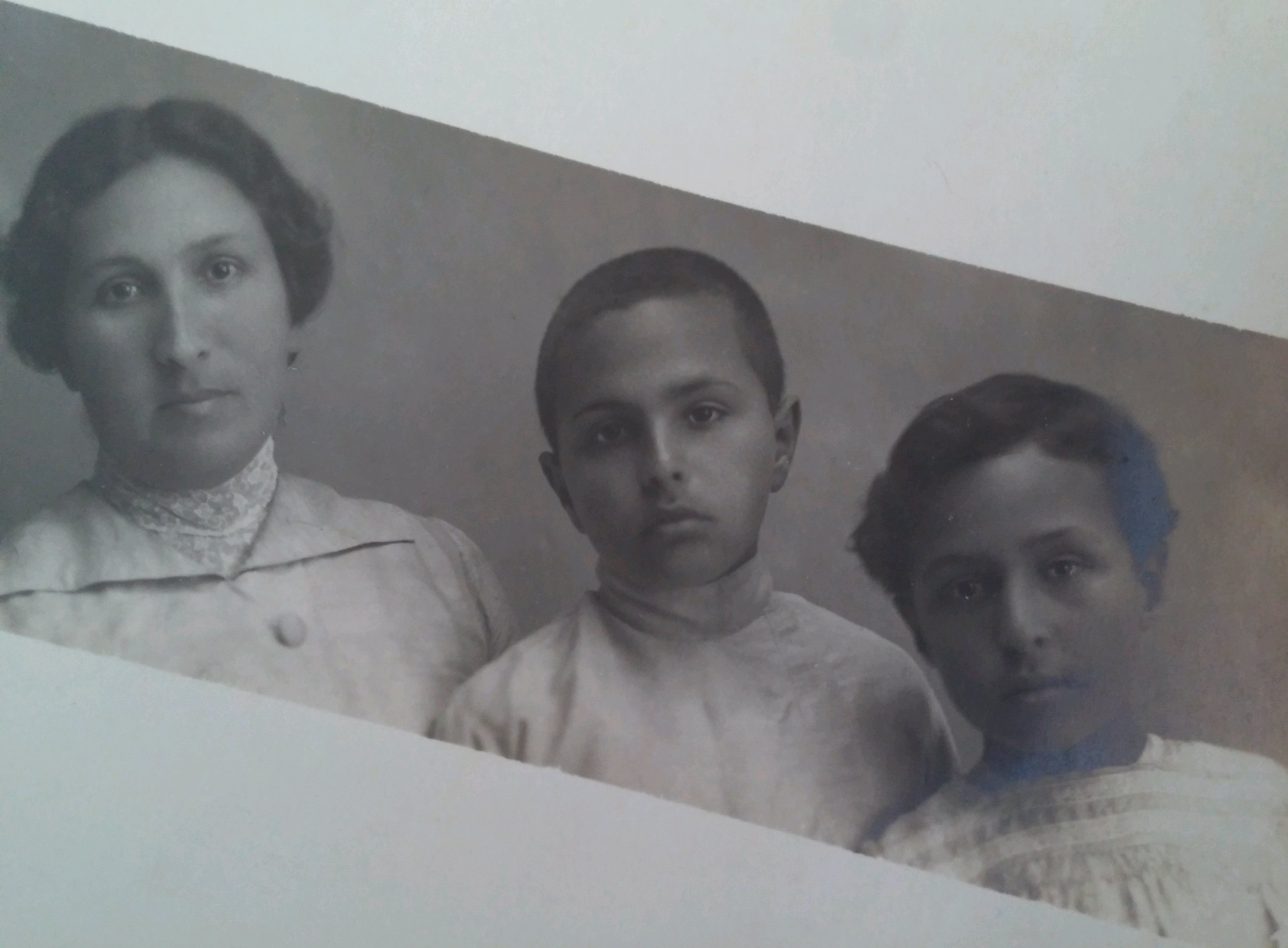
Azariahu and her children Tahia and Yaakov, 1914

The family lifestyle of Sarah and Yosef Azarihu was based on equality, their youngest son Arnan Azariahu said that family relations were based on respect and equality, both between the couple and between the parents and the children.

In 1926 the family returned to live in Tel Aviv and she retired from teaching. She traveled frequently to committee meetings in Jerusalem and took part in all four sessions of the Assembly of Representatives until the establishment of the state.

In 1954 she moved to Kibbutz Afikim with her daughter Tahia, who was one of its founders. She was the mother of four: Yaakov Ezriahu (1901), Tahia Gilboa (1907), Gideon Ezriahu (1912–1914) and Arnan (Sini) Ezriahu (1917), a veteran of the Palmach and a member of the Labor movement.

== Death and legacy ==
Azariahu died in Afikim in 1962. She is buried in the Trumpeldor Cemetery in the writers and public figures section next to her husband.

In 2018 Jerusalem's city council's naming committee decided to name a street in their city after Sarah Azariahu.
