= Azaryan =

Azaryan or Azarian (Armenian: Ազարյան) is an Armenian surname. Notable people with the surname include:

- Albert Azaryan (1929–2023), Soviet Armenian artistic gymnast
- Eduard Azaryan (born 1958), Soviet Armenian artistic gymnast
- Krikor Azaryan (1934–2009), Bulgarian theatre director
- Mary Azarian (born 1940), American woodcut artist and children's book illustrator
- Mihran Azaryan (1876–1952), Ottoman Armenian and Turkish architect
- Mina Azarian (born 1959), Swedish actress
- Onnik Der Azarian (1883–1935), Ottoman Armenian painter

== See also ==
- Azaria (surname)
- Azariah (disambiguation)
- Azarias (given name)
