= Einsatzkommando Egypt =

Nazi SS unit

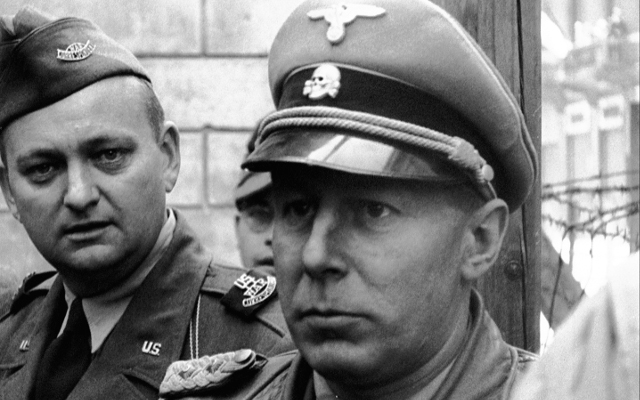
Walther Rauff, 1945

Einsatzkommando Egypt (German: Einsatzkommando Ägypten) was the name assigned to an SS unit led by SS-Obersturmbannführer Walther Rauff, which was formed in occupied Greece during World War II awaiting deployment to North Africa, once the Afrika Korps had conquered Egypt and moved into Mandatory Palestine. Einsatzkommandos ("deployment commandos") were paramilitary death squads that operated within German occupied territories.

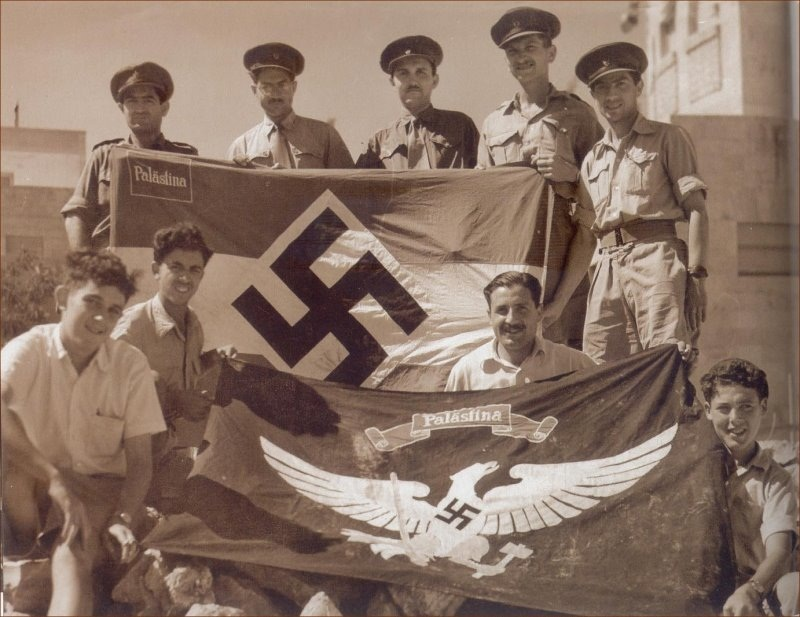
Palestine Nazi Party

Historians Klaus-Michael Mallmann and Martin Cüppers, based on archival research, state that the unit's purpose was to carry out a mass killing of the Jewish populations in Mandatory Palestine and Egypt. The researchers state that the unit's objective was to go there in order to enact systematic mass murder of Jews. Given its small staff of only 24 men, Mallmann and Cüppers theorize the unit would have needed help from local residents and from the Afrika Korps to complete their assignment. On 20 July 1942, Rauff was sent to Tobruk to report to Rommel, Commander of the Afrika Korps. But since Rommel was 500 km away at the First Battle of El Alamein, it is unlikely that the two were able to meet.

The plans for Einsatzkommando Egypt were set aside after the Allied victory at the Second Battle of El Alamein. According to Mallmann and Cüppers, "the history of the Middle East would have been completely different and a Jewish state could never have been established if the Germans and Arabs had joined forces."

== See also ==
- 200 days of dread
- Palestine Final Fortress
