= Ben Azariah =

Ben Azariah may refer to:

- Daniel ben Azariah (11th-century), the gaon of the Land of Israel from 1051 till 1062
- Eleazar ben Azariah, a 1st-century CE Jewish tanna, i.e. Mishnaic sage

== See also ==
- Azariah
