= Azariah =

Azariah (Hebrew: עֲזַרְיָה ‘Ǎzaryāh, "Yah has helped") is the name of several people in the Hebrew Bible and Jewish history, including:

- Azariah, the name that archangel Raphael uses as companion of Tobias in the Book of Tobit.
- Azariah (guardian angel), the guardian angel of Maria Valtorta to whom one of her handwritten books is dedicated
- Azariah (prophet), a prophet (2 Chronicles 15:1–8)
- Azariah (high priest) high priest of Israel (1 Kings 4:2)
- Azariah II, another high priest, in the reign of Uzziah (2 Chronicles 26:17–20)
- Eleazar ben Azariah, the Mishnaic sage
- Abednego, the new name given to Azariah, who is the companion of Daniel, Hananiah, and Mishael in the Book of Daniel (Daniel 1:6–7)
- Uzziah, King of Judah, also known as Azariah
- Two "commanders of the hundreds" who formed part of Jehoiada's campaign to restore the kingship to Joash in 2 Chronicles 23: Azariah, son of Jeroham and Azariah son of Obed.

== Other people named Azariah ==
- Azariah Flagg (1790–1873), New York politician
- Azariah S. Partridge (1834–1901), Michigan state representative
- Azariah Wart (1822–1900), New York assemblyman
- Vedanayagam Samuel Azariah (1874–1945), Anglican bishop of Dornakal, India

== See also ==
- Azahriah
- Azaria (surname)
- Azarian (surname)
- Azaryan (surname)
- Azarias (given name)
- Ben Azariah (disambiguation)
- Prayer of Azariah and Song of the Three Holy Children
- Azariahu
