= Azarias =

Azarias is a given name. Notable people with the name include:

- Azarias Friton, Roman Catholic prelate
- Azarías Pallais, Nicaraguan poet
- Azarias Ruberwa, Congolese politician, lawyer, and public figure
- Brother Azarias, Irish-American educator, essayist and littérateur

== Other ==
- The Prayer of Azariah and Song of the Three Holy Children, also named Prayer of Azarias

== See also ==
- Luka Azariashvili
- Azaria (surname)
- Azariah (disambiguation)
- Azarian (surname)
- Azaryan (surname)
