= 200 days of dread =

World War II event in British Palestine

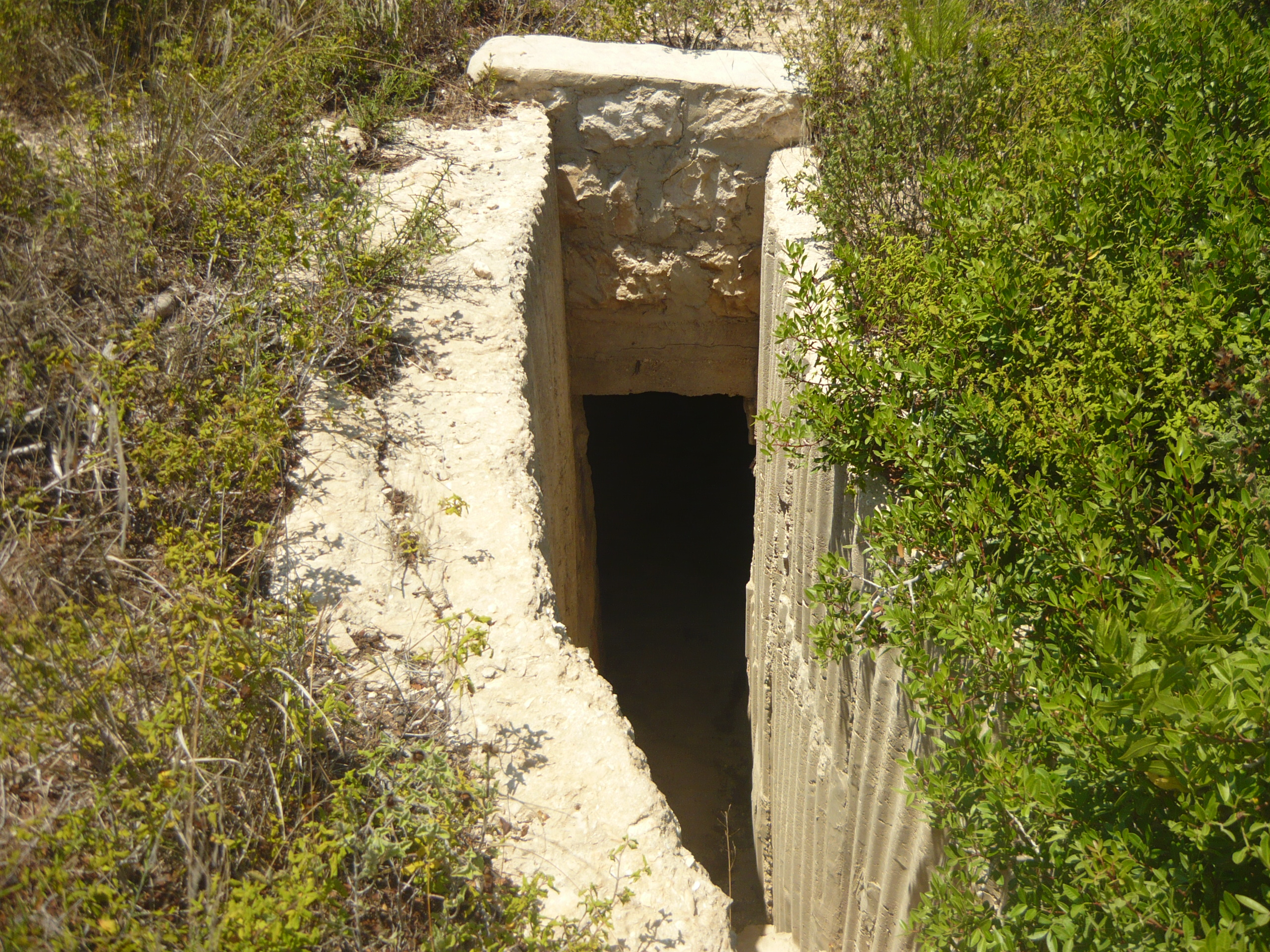
British bunker on Mount Carmel

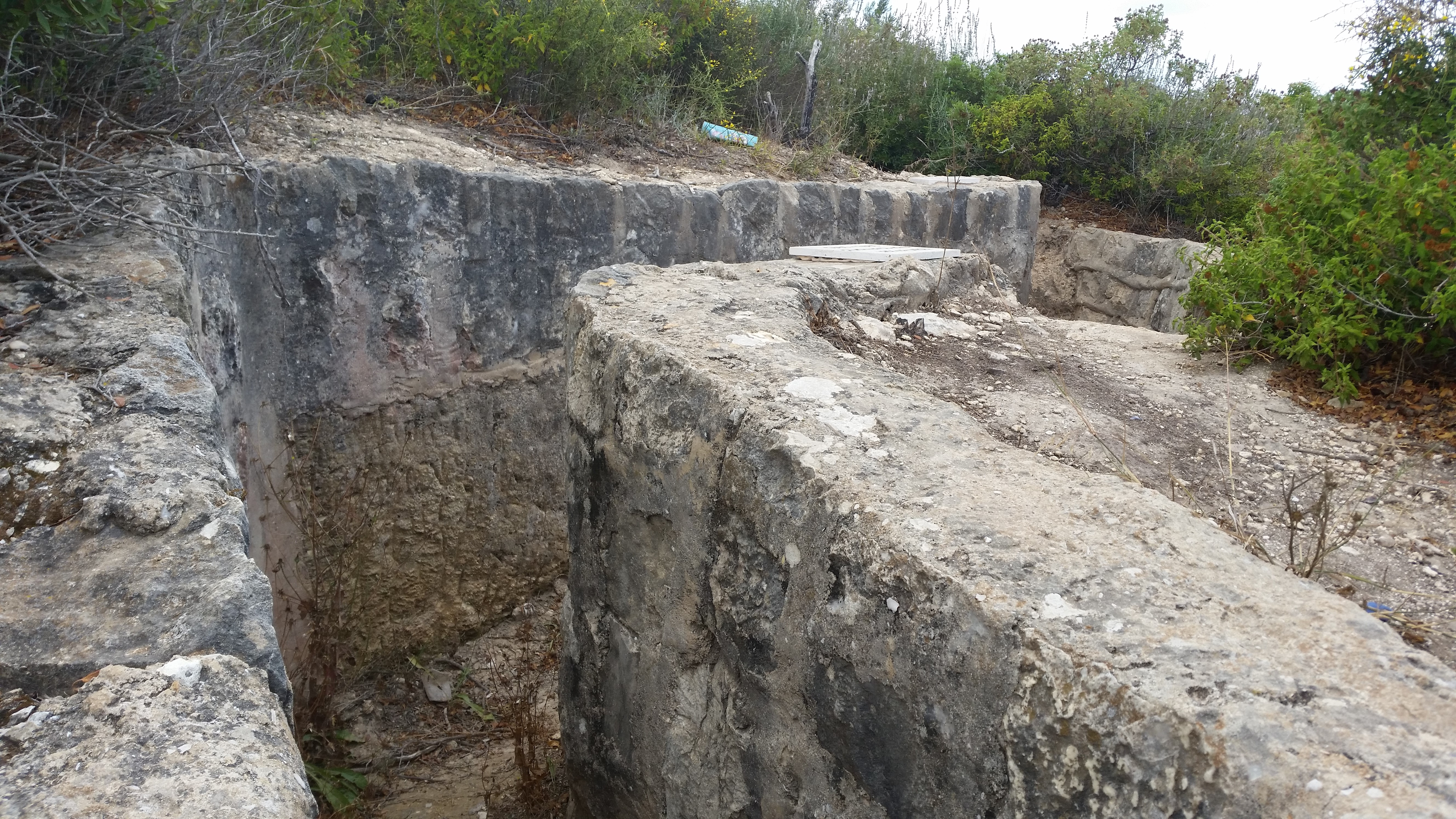
British trench on Mount Carmel

The 200 days of dread (Hebrew: מאתיים ימי חרדה; matayim yamei kharada) was a period of 200 days (almost 7 months) in the history of the Yishuv in British Palestine, from the spring of 1942 to November 1942, when the German Afrika Korps under the command of General Erwin Rommel was heading east towards the Suez Canal and Palestine.

== History ==
The question of whether the Yishuv would need to defend itself against a possible German invasion rose twice during the Second World War. The first major threat was a German invasion from the north, from the pro-Nazi Vichy regime in control of Syria and Lebanon. This danger ended after Operation Exporter, the Allied invasion of these countries on 8 June 1941, and their liberation from Vichy control.

In 1942 a more serious threat emerged as the German Afrika Korps, under the command of Erwin Rommel, threatened to overrun British possessions in the Middle East. The "200 days of dread" ended after the Allied victory in the Second Battle of El Alamein.

According to historians Klaus-Michael Mallmann and Martin Cüppers, based on archival research, Einsatzgruppe Egypt was to carry out a mass killing of the Jewish population in Palestine and Egypt. Despite the word "Palestine" never being mentioned in the archival documents, the researchers state that the unit's objective was to go there in order to enact systematic mass murder of Jews. The unit was standing by in Athens and was ready to disembark for Palestine in the summer of 1942, to be attached to the Afrika Korps. Given its small staff of only 24 men, Mallmann and Cüppers theorize the unit would have needed help from local residents and from the Afrika Korps to complete their assignment.

According to historian Haim Saadon, Director of the Center of Research on North African Jewry in World War II, there was no extermination plan: Documents of the SS commander in Tunisia, Walter Rauff, show that his foremost concern was assisting the Wehrmacht, and his plan for this was to place the Jews in forced labour camps. In relative terms, the North African Jews escaped the Final Solution.

The Hebrew term "200 days of dread" was coined only later by the contemporary journalist Haviv Canaan, as taken from the title of his 1974 book on this period. In 1941–42 the Haganah was preparing a last stand in the event that the British would retreat from the German army as far as Syria and Iraq. The "Plan of the North" was also called "Masada on the Carmel", and "Haifa–Masada–Musa Dagh". It was based on a British plan called the Palestine Final Fortress.

== See also ==
- Einsatzgruppe Egypt
- History of Palestine
- Holocaust
