= Union of Hebrew Women for Equal Rights in Erez Israel =

Hebrew Women's Organisation

Union of Hebrew Women for Equal Rights in Erez Israel was a women's organization in Israel, founded in 1919.

The organization was co-founded by a nonpartisan group of Jewish women, Dr. Rosa Welt-Straus, Dr. Miriam Nofach, Esther Yevin, Hasya Sukenik-Feinsod, and Sara Azaryahu, who wished to assure women's equal rights within the Zionist movement and the future envisioned state of Israel. They advocated for women's suffrage, along with several other issues within gender equality, such as a ban on child marriage, women's right to citizenship and immigration to Israel separately and without the need for approval from their husbands.

The Union put forward their list of women candidates in the elections to the Constituent Assembly in 1920 and demanded women's suffrage; a several-year conflict followed with the Orthodox parties. In 1926, the National Assembly declared that women would have equal rights (including suffrage) in the future state, and the Union succeeded in its struggle for women's suffrage, which was indeed introduced when Israel became a state in 1947.

The Union was affiliated with the International Alliance of Women, and its representatives participated in the congresses of the IWSA in Geneva, 1920; Rome, 1923; Paris, 1926 and Berlin, 1929.
