= Esther Yeivin =

Israeli politician (1877–1975)

Esther Yeivin (1877–1975) was an Israeli political activist and feminist.

== Early life ==
She was born Esther Yunis in Bessarabia in 1877. Her parents were Shlomo and Feige Yunis. She received a comprehensive Hebrew education, giving her a proficient knowledge of Hebrew and an expert background in foundational texts on women's rights. She was childhood friends with Joseph Klausner, who later became a prominent historian. She married Nisan Yeivin in 1894 and worked as a Hebrew teacher in Odessa. They had three children, including Shemuel Yeivin. She emigrated to Palestine in 1905 with her children after the Odessa pogroms of 1905. Her husband Nisan joined them in Israel three years later.

She lived in Gedera with her family for many years before relocating to Tel Aviv so that her children could attend the Herzliya Hebrew Gymnasium in the city. She became involved in public work and political activism after moving to Tel Aviv.

== Career ==
Yeivin was an important figure in the struggle for women's suffrage in Israel. Yeivin was a founding member of the Union of Hebrew Women for Equal Rights in Erez Israel in 1919. She ran as a candidate from the Women's Union in the 1920 Assembly of Representatives election and was elected as a delegate.

In 1944, reflecting on the 25th anniversary of the union, Yeivin wrote that:

"In this battle [for voting rights for women in Eretz Israel] women have learned an important lesson, namely, that the solution of important problems cannot be postponed, and that one cannot depend on others, always remembering the [the sayin], 'If I am not for myself who will be fore me? And if not now, when?'"

She was chair of the Tel Aviv Women's Association.

She died in 1975.
