= Yishuv =

Jews in Palestine before 1948

ישוב

Total population
- 1880s: 25,000
- 1948: 630,000

Regions with significant populations
- Palestine (Ottoman Syria, OETA South, Mandatory Palestine)

Languages
- Hebrew, Ladino, Judeo-Arabic, Yiddish

Religion
- Judaism

Related ethnic groups
- Old Yishuv, New Yishuv

The Yishuv (Hebrew: ישוב, lit. 'settlement'), HaYishuv Ha'ivri (Hebrew: הישוב העברי, lit. 'the Hebrew settlement'), or HaYishuv HaYehudi Be'Eretz Yisra'el (lit. 'the Jewish Settlement in the Land of Israel'), was the community of Jews residing in Palestine prior to the establishment of the State of Israel in 1948. The Yishuv was also referred to as the Palestinian Jewish community. The term Yishuv came into use in the 1880s, when there were about 25,000 Jews living in that region, and continued to be used until 1948, by which time there were some 630,000 Jews there. The term is still in use to denote the pre-1948 Jewish residents in Palestine, corresponding to the southern part of Ottoman Syria until 1918, OETA South in 1917–1920, and Mandatory Palestine in 1920–1948.

A distinction is sometimes drawn between the Old Yishuv and the New Yishuv. 'Old Yishuv' refers to all the Jews living in Palestine before the first Zionist immigration wave (aliyah) of 1882, and to their descendants until 1948. The Old Yishuv residents were religious Jews, living mainly in Jerusalem, Safed, Tiberias, and Hebron. There were smaller communities in Jaffa, Haifa, Peki'in, Acre, Nablus, Shfaram, and until 1799 in Gaza. In the final centuries before modern Zionism, a large part of the Old Yishuv spent their time studying the Torah and lived off charity (halukka), donated by Jews in the diaspora.

The term 'New Yishuv' refers to those who adopted a new approach, based on economic independence and various national ideologies, rather than strictly religious reasons for settling in the "Holy Land". The precursors began building homes outside the Old City walls of Jerusalem in the 1860s, followed soon after by the founders of the moshava of Petah Tikva, with growth in full swing during the First Aliyah of 1882, followed by the founding of neighbourhoods and villages until the establishment of the State of Israel in 1948.

== Ottoman rule ==
=== Old Yishuv ===
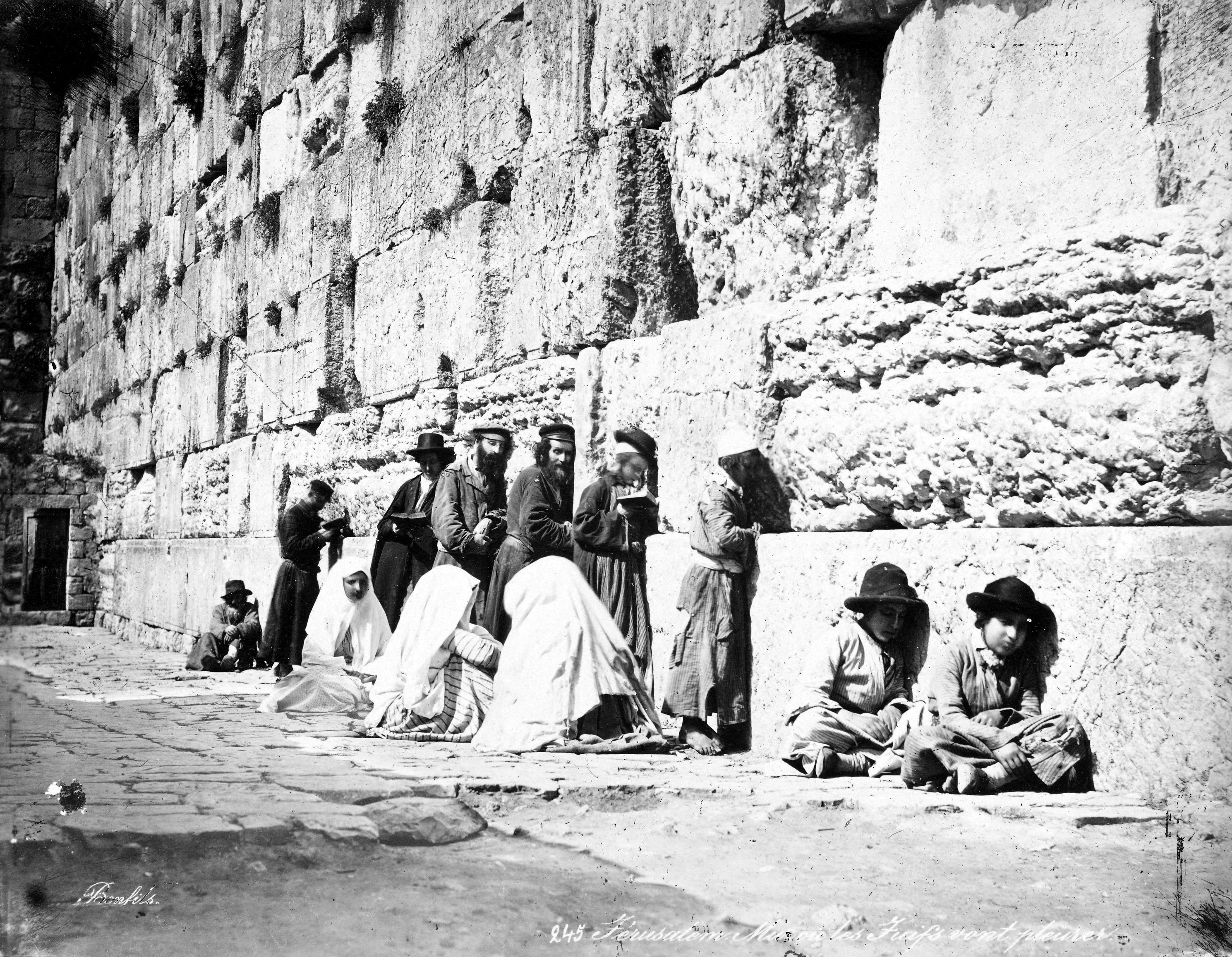
Jews at the Kotel, 1870s

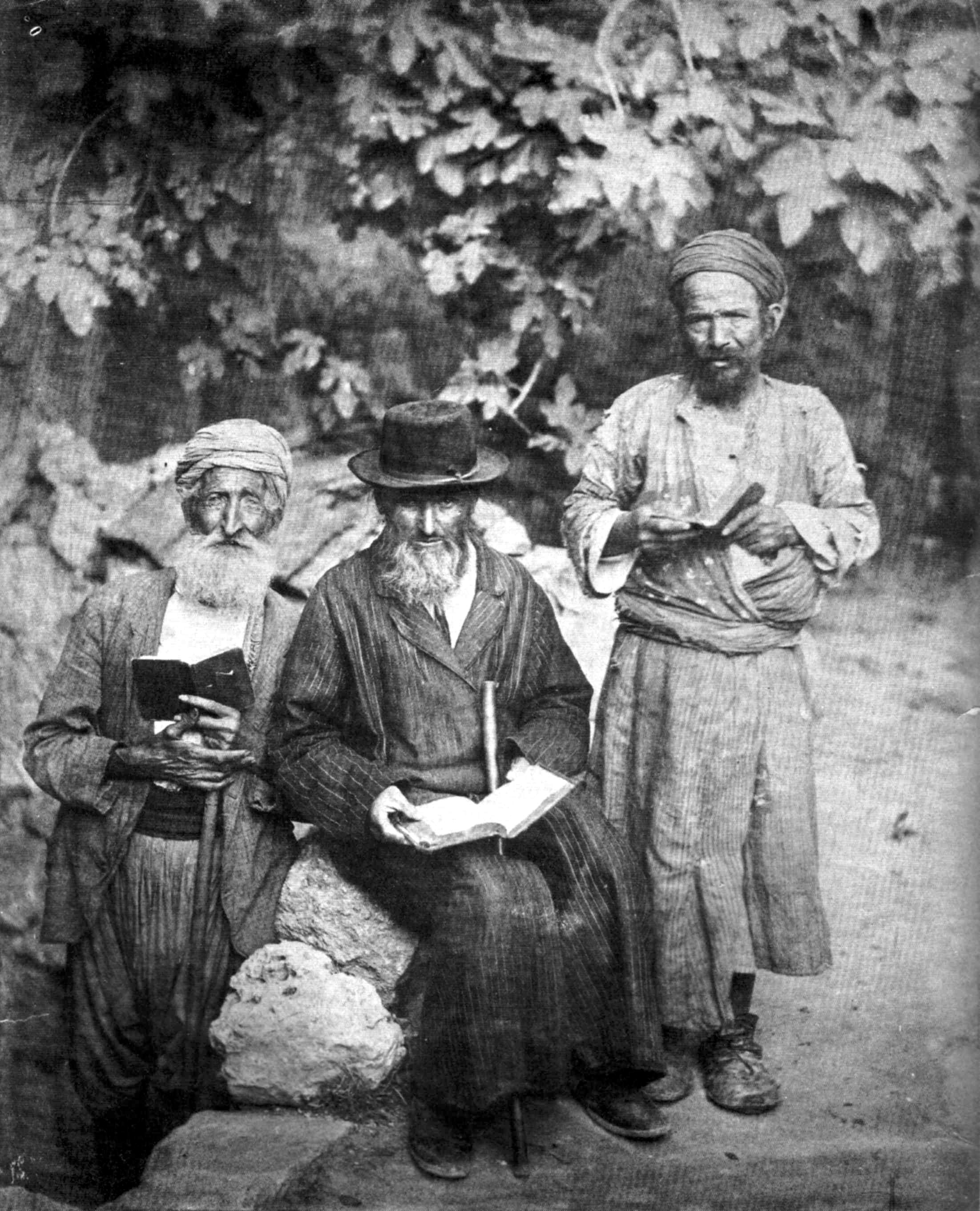
Jewish community in the Mutasarrifate of Jerusalem under Ottoman rule, 1895

The Old Yishuv were the Jewish communities of southern Ottoman Syria in the Ottoman Empire, up to the onset of Zionist aliyah and the consolidation of the New Yishuv by the end of World War I in 1918 and the establishment of the British Mandate for Palestine. The Old Yishuv had continuously resided in Palestine and was largely made up of ultra-Orthodox Jews dependent on external donations (Halukka) for living, as opposed to the later Zionist aliyah and the New Yishuv, who were more socialist-leaning and secular, emphasizing labor and self-sufficiency.

The Old Yishuv developed after a period of severe decline in Jewish communities of the Southern Levant during the early Middle Ages, and was composed of three clusters. The oldest group consisted of the Ladino-speaking Sephardic Jewish communities in Galilee and the Judeo-Arabic speaking Musta'arabi Jews who settled in Eretz Yisrael in the Ottoman and late Mamluk period. A second group was composed of Ashkenazi and Hasidic Jews who had emigrated from Europe in the 18th and early 19th centuries. A third wave was constituted by Yishuv members who arrived in the late 19th century. The Old Yishuv was thus generally divided into two independent communities – the Sephardi Jews (including Musta'arabim), mainly constituting the remains of Jewish communities of Galilee and the Four Holy Cities of Judaism, which had flourished in the 16th and 17th centuries; and the Ashkenazi Jews, whose immigration from Europe was primarily since the 18th century.

The Old Yishuv term was coined by members of the 'New Yishuv' in the late 19th century to distinguish themselves from the economically dependent and generally earlier Jewish communities, who mainly resided in the four holy cities, and unlike the New Yishuv, had not embraced land ownership and agriculture. Apart from the Old Yishuv centres in the four holy cities of Judaism, namely Jerusalem, Hebron, Tiberias, and Safed, smaller communities also existed in Jaffa, Haifa, Peki'in, Acre, Nablus, and Shfaram. Petah Tikva, although established in 1878 by the Old Yishuv, nevertheless was also supported by the arriving Zionists. Rishon LeZion, the first settlement founded by the Hovevei Zion in 1882, could be considered the true beginning of the New Yishuv.

=== Beginning of modern Aliyah (New Yishuv) ===
The Ottoman government was not supportive of the new settlers from the First and Second Aliyah, as the Ottoman government officially restricted Jewish immigration. The Yishuv relied on money from abroad to support their settlements.

In 1908, the Zionist Organization founded the Palestine Office, under Arthur Ruppin, for land acquisition, agricultural settlement and training, and later for urban expansion. The first Hebrew high schools were opened in Palestine as well as the Technion, the first institution for higher learning. Hashomer, a Zionist self-defence group, was created to protect the Jewish settlements. Labor organizations were created along with health and cultural services, all later coordinated by the Jewish National Council. By 1914, the old Yishuv was a minority, and the New Yishuv began to express itself and its Zionist goals.

The First Aliyah was the very beginning of the creation of the New Yishuv. More than 25,000 Jews immigrated to Palestine. The immigrants were inspired by the notion of creating a national home for Jews. Most of the Jewish immigrants came from Russia, escaping the pogroms, while some arrived from Yemen. Many of the immigrants were affiliated with Hovevei Zion. Hovevei Zion purchased land from Arabs and other Ottoman subjects and created various settlements such as Yesud HaMa'ala, Rosh Pinna, Gedera, Rishon LeZion, Nes Tziona and Rechovot. These agricultural settlements were supported by philanthropists from abroad, chiefly Edmond James de Rothschild and Alphonse James de Rothschild.

Eliezer Ben-Yehuda also immigrated during the first Aliyah. Ben-Yehuda took it upon himself to revive the Hebrew language, and along with Nissim Bechar started a school for teaching Hebrew, later on founding the first Hebrew newspaper.

During the Second Aliyah, between 1903 and 1914, there were 35,000 new immigrants, primarily from the Russian Empire.

During World War I, the conditions for Jews in the Ottoman Empire worsened. All those Jews who were of an enemy nationality were exiled and others were drafted into the Ottoman army. Many of those exiled fled to Egypt or the United States. Those who remained in Ottoman Palestine faced hard economic times. There was disagreement whether to support the British or the Turks. A clandestine group, Nili, was established to pass information to the British in the hope of defeating the Ottomans and ending their rule over Palestine. The purpose and members of the Nili were discovered. All involved were executed by the Ottomans except its founder, Aaron Aaronsohn, who escaped to Egypt. During World War I, the Jewish population in Palestine diminished by a third due to deportations, immigration, economic trouble and disease. In 1915, the British Army recruited Yishuv Jews who had been exiled to Egypt into the Zion Mule Corps, which provided logistical support during the Gallipoli campaign. Subsequently, the British established the Jewish Legion, which participated in the British conquest of Ottoman Syria (including Palestine), leading to the Turkish surrender. The Jewish Legion's soldiers were predominantly diaspora Jews, but after British forces entered Palestine, a battalion of local Jews was recruited, which carried out support roles and guarded prisoners.

=== Paramilitary forces ===
See Bar-Giora, Hamagen, Hanoter, and Hashomer.

== During the British Mandate ==
World War I saw the dissolution of the Ottoman Empire and the division of its territory. The Sykes–Picot Agreement led to a division of Ottoman territory between British and French rule, and the McMahon–Hussein correspondence "ambiguously omitted" the region of Palestine from what was promised to become an Arab state to the Hashemite sharif. The British then worked to follow through on the Balfour Declaration of 1917, that announced British support for the Zionist aspiration to establish "a national home for the Jewish people" in Palestine. The Jewish population was variously estimated at less than 10% of the population of Palestine before the beginning of British Mandatory rule (1920–1948) to slightly more at the beginning.

Under British rule Jewish immigration, the majority from Europe, led to the rapid growth of the Yishuv. It referred to this immigration in Hebrew as aliyah, meaning "going up", giving it an ideological and religious connotation unlike immigration to other places. Additional Jewish land purchases in Palestine enabled the establishment of more farming communities known as moshavim and kibbutzim. The League of Nations codified support for the eventual "establishment in Palestine of a national home for the Jewish people" into the foundational document of the British Mandate in Palestine, thereby facilitating what detractors later regarded not as aliyah, or the flight of refugees from Nazi and Fascist atrocities, but as the Zionist colonization of Palestine. The Yishuv had a level of international recognition that the Arab Higher Committee, the governing body of the Arab majority in Mandatory Palestine did not have. At times the British referred to the Arabs only as "non-Jewish communities".

=== Parliamentary representation and self-government ===
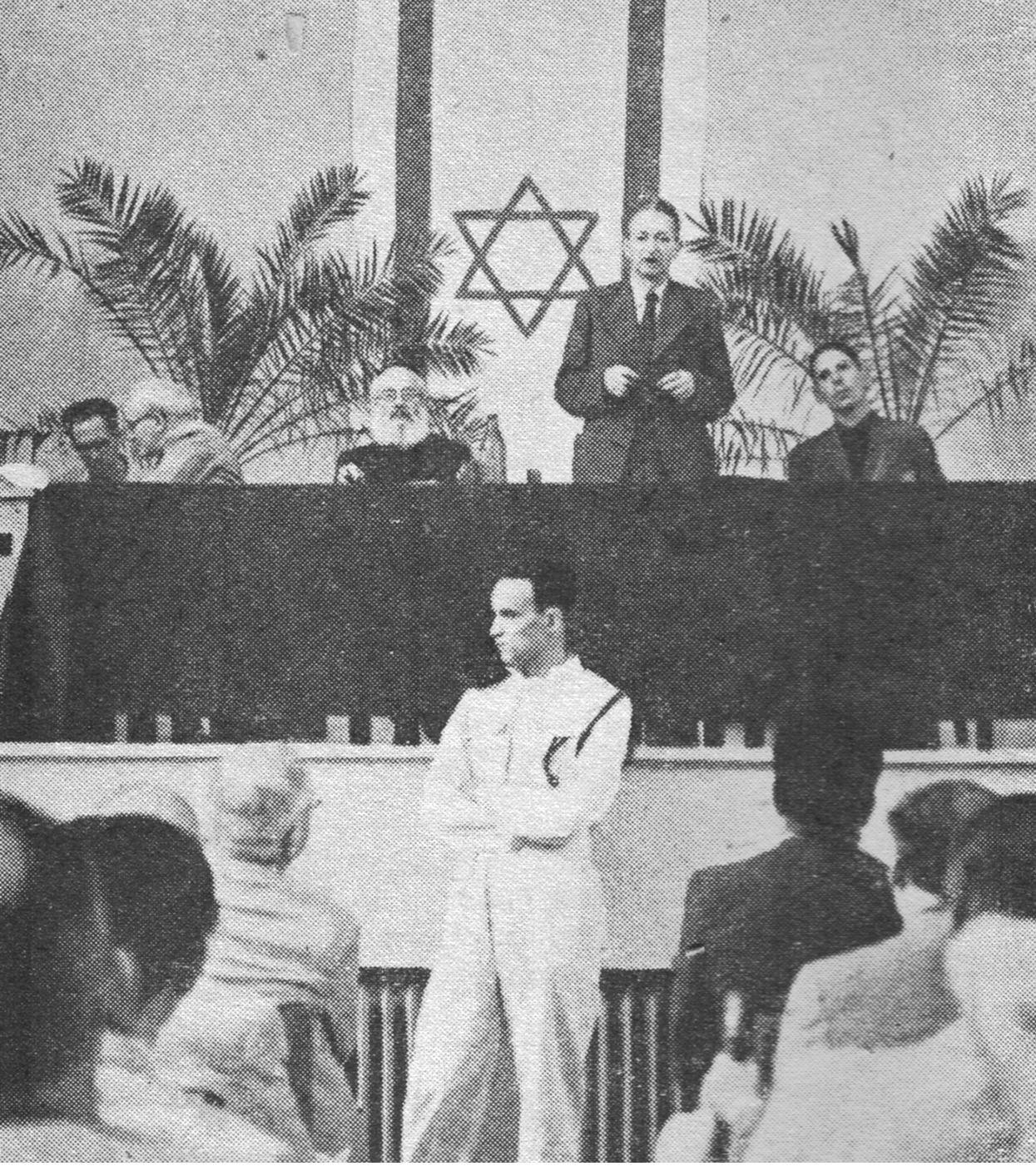
Yitzhak Ben-Zvi at the Yishuv's Assembly of Representatives, September 1944

A department of the World Zionist Organization became the Jewish Agency for Palestine, and later the Jewish Agency for Israel. The agency and representative bodies were set up to enable self government. The Assembly of Representatives was the elected parliamentary assembly of the Jewish community in Mandatory Palestine. It was established on 19 April 1920, and functioned until 13 February 1949, the day before the first Knesset, elected on 25 January, was sworn in. The Assembly met once a year to elect the executive body, the Jewish National Council, which was responsible for education, local government, welfare, security and defense. It also voted on the budgets proposed by the Jewish National Council and the Rabbinical Council. The Jewish National Council (ועד לאומי Va'ad Le'umi) was also known as the General Council of the Jewish Community of Palestine.

Yishuv governing institutions were recognized by the British government and created a quasi state as well as a structure of self-governing institutions that legitimately represented the Jewish population. It was "recognized as a public body for the purpose of advising and cooperating with the Administration of Palestine", and it was entitled to diplomatic representation in the League of Nations Permanent Mandates Commission in Geneva, as well as in London and elsewhere. These were given quasi-official diplomatic status by Britain and the League of Nations, giving the Yishuv's governing bodies international legitimacy.

=== Paramilitary forces ===
The most notable Jewish paramilitaries in the British Mandate of Palestine were the Haganah, the Irgun and Lehi. In October 1945, during the Jewish insurgency in Mandatory Palestine, those organizations joined to form the Jewish Resistance Movement. It was established by the Jewish Agency and activated for some ten months, until August, 1946. The alliance coordinated acts of sabotage and attacks against British authorities.

=== Women's rights ===
Many women who immigrated to Israel came out of national Zionist motives; they wanted the same rights as men and wanted to rebuild their land. In 1919 the first nationwide women's party in the New Yishuv (the Union of Hebrew Women for Equal Rights in Eretz Israel) was created, and Rosa Welt-Straus, who had immigrated there that year, was appointed its leader, as which she continued until her death. The constituent assembly was voted upon in 1920, and 14 women were elected out of the three hundred and fourteen delegates. As well as the increase in the number of women filling public positions, the rate of women participating in the labor force increased steadily during the British mandate period in the Yishuv. With that being said, the employment opportunities at the beginning of the mandate period were very limited and women were mainly restricted to typical female occupations because the only other option would be to work in construction, which only pioneer women committed to as part of their feminist-nationalist outlook because those roles were considered inappropriate for women. Women were consistently more unemployed when compared to their male counterparts, regardless of cyclical fluctuations. The wages for working women were consistently lower than the wages of their male counterparts, and throughout the Yishuv period, the average wage for women were 50 to 70 percent of male's wage.

Not only were non-religious women fighting for equality, but so were religious women. Female religious Zionists were faced with double the amount of barriers of non-religious female Zionists because they were rejected from religious society because of their gender and they were rejected from secular society because of their religiosity. In 1926, the haredim, who preferred not to face the possibility of a plebiscite, left the Yishuv's Assembly of Representatives. That year, an official declaration was made (ratified by the mandate government in 1927) confirming "equal rights to women in all aspects of life in the yishuv – civil, political, and economic". In 1935, the establishment of the national organization of religious pioneer women emerged. Its main goal was to improve the material status and spiritual welfare of the religious women workers and gain admittance to the Ha-Po'el ha-Mizrachi. This organization grew from eight-hundred members in 1935 to six-thousand members in 1948. Women gained rights with the establishment of the religious kibbutz movement by participating in Torah studies with men and by taking part in the activities that the kibbutz offered.

=== History ===
There were Arab riots throughout 1920–21 in opposition to the Balfour Declaration. The Arabs tried to show the British the instability of Palestine and that a Jewish homeland was ungovernable. Riots increased in 1929 after the fourth Aliyah – 133 Jews were killed by Arab mobs during the 1929 Palestine riots. Arabs claimed that Jewish immigration and land purchases were displacing them and taking their jobs away. These riots were also instigated by false rumours that the Jews were planning on building a synagogue near the Western Wall. These riots led to the evacuation of Hebron's indigenous – largely non-Zionist – Jewish population. The Sursock Purchases led to the eviction of around nine thousands Palestinian Arab tenant farmers. They became a focus of the Shaw Commission search for causes of the riots. The 1936 Arab general strike against British colonial rule and its support for Zionism led to the Peel Commission, which recommended the partition of Palestine, leading to the peasant-led 1936–1939 Arab revolt in Palestine also known as the Palestinian Revolt.

==== The 1936–1939 Arab revolt ====
The increasing numbers of Jewish immigrants and land purchases, unchallenged by the British Mandate, angered and radicalized many Arabs. In April 1936, Arabs attacked a Jewish bus, leading to a series of incidents that escalated into a major Arab rebellion. The British were caught by surprise and were unable to prevent the deaths of thousands of Arabs and hundreds of Jews in the revolt. The Haganah protected the Yishuv's settlements while the Irgun, a radical splinter group, launched a campaign of attacks against Arabs. A coalition of recently formed Arab political parties formed the Arab Higher Committee (AHC). It declared a national strike in support of three basic demands: cessation of Jewish immigration, an end to all further land sales to the Jews, and the establishment of an Arab national government. The Arabs threatened that if the British did not comply with their demands then they would join the adversaries of the British. This concerned the British for World War II was just beginning and they knew they would need Middle Eastern oil.

The British worked with their Arab allies to bring a halt to the AHC riots. The Peel Commission reported, in July 1937, that the British obligations to the Arabs and Zionists were irreconcilable and the mandate unworkable. It suggested the partition of Palestine into Arab and Jewish states, with the British mandate governing over Nazareth, Bethlehem, and Jerusalem along with a corridor from Jerusalem to the coast. The Jews accepted the general principle of a partition while the Arabs refused any partition plan. The British government sent a technical team called the Woodhead Commission to detail the plan. The Woodhead Commission considered three different plans, one of which was based on the Peel plan. Reporting in 1938, the Commission rejected the Peel plan primarily on the grounds that it could not be implemented without a massive forced transfer of Arabs (an option that the British government had already ruled out). With dissent from some of its members, the Commission instead recommended a plan that would leave the Galilee under British mandate, but emphasised serious problems with it that included a lack of financial self-sufficiency of the proposed Arab State. The British Government accompanied the publication of the Woodhead Report by a statement of policy rejecting partition as impracticable due to "political, administrative and financial difficulties".

The Arab Revolt broke out again in the autumn of 1937. The British ended the revolt using harsh measures, deporting many Palestinian Arab leaders and shutting down the AHC. In the Yishuv, the Arab Revolt reinforced the already firm belief in the need for a strong Jewish defence network. Finally, the Arab agricultural boycott that began in 1936 forced the Jewish economy into even greater self-sufficiency. The Haganah during this period changed from being a small clandestine militia to a large military force. The British security forces at this time cooperated with the Haganah to respond to the Arabs.

In 1938 Captain Orde Wingate created the Special Night Squads (SNS) that were composed mostly of Haganah members. SNS used the element of surprise in night raids to protect the Jewish settlements and attack the Arabs.

==== White paper of 1939 ====
The British responded to the Arab riots with the White Paper of 1939. It was based on the Hope Simpson Report, which stated that Palestine after economic development could support only 20,000 more immigrant families without infringing on the Arab population's placement and employment. It therefore attempted to curtail immigration to Palestine. Upon Jewish criticism of this policy, it was clarified that immigration would not be stopped entirely but would be restricted by quotas.

There were many Jewish immigrants that arrived throughout the 1930s in the fifth Aliyah, despite the immigration quotas. Many who came were fleeing persecution in Eastern Europe. Those that came from Nazi Germany were able to come because of the Haavara Agreement. This allowed Jews to escape from Germany to Palestine in return for paying a ransom to the Reich. By then, the Yishuv had a population of about 400,000.

==== During World War II ====
The Yishuv wanted to help their fellow Jews, who were being murdered by the Nazis in Europe. Many Jews from Europe were prevented from fleeing to Mandatory Palestine by strict immigration quotas established by the white papers. The Jewish Agency organized illegal immigration from 1939 through 1942 with the help of the Haganah. Those who arrived illegally to Israel during this time were part of the Aliyah Bet. This was a dangerous operation, for these illegal immigrants arrived by boat and had to be careful not to be caught by the British or Nazis. Many of these ships sank or were caught, such as the Patria, Struma and Bulgaria. Compared with the number of attempts, few ships actually arrived successfully to Mandatory Palestine, but tens of thousands of Jews were saved by the illegal immigration.

The Yishuv also wanted to directly participate in the war effort and try to save Jews from the Nazi atrocities. About 30,000 Jews of the Yishuv enlisted in the British Armed Forces during the war, serving in the British Army, Royal Navy, and Royal Air Force. Additional volunteers joined the British Merchant Navy. The Yishuv's economy was also mobilized to support the war effort, with its factories producing weaponry for the British military. In 1942 the Jewish Agency turned to the British to offer their assistance by sending Jewish volunteers to Europe as emissaries of the Yishuv to organize local resistance and rescue operations among the Jewish communities. The British accepted the proposal but on a much smaller scale than the Jewish agency had hoped. They only took Jewish parachutists who were recent immigrants from certain targeted countries that they wanted to infiltrate. The British Special Forces and military intelligence both consented to the volunteers' dual role as British agents and Jewish emissaries. 110 Yishuv members were trained; however only 32 were deployed. Many of them succeeded in helping the POWs and uprisings in the Jewish communities, while others were caught. After lobbying for an all-Jewish fighting force, the Jewish Brigade was established in 1944 as a brigade group of the British Army composed of volunteers from the Yishuv led by Anglo-Jewish officers. The brigade fought in the closing stages of the Italian campaign and its soldiers assisted Holocaust survivors afterward.

There were two periods during the war when the Yishuv faced a direct threat from Nazi forces. The first occurred following Germany's conquest of France in 1940, since the pro-Nazi Vichy regime controlled the northern Levant, from which an invasion of Palestine could take place. Amid the threat of invasion, British cooperation with the Haganah deepened and the Palmach was established as the Haganah's elite strike force with British assistance in 1941. Allied forces successfully fought Vichy forces for control of Syria and Lebanon in 1941, and Palmach forces participated in the campaign alongside Allied troops. The defeat of Vichy French forces in Syria and Lebanon removed the threat of invasion from the north, at least as long as German armies in Eastern Europe could be held back by the Red Army and thus unable to easily advance towards the Near East from the north. In 1942 however, as Erwin Rommel's Afrika Korps swept across North Africa with the intent of capturing the Suez Canal, the likelihood of a German invasion from the south became a real possibility, causing great anxiety in the Yishuv and prompting plans to be drawn for its defense. Knowing that Nazi control of Palestine meant certain annihilation of the Yishuv, a debate raged among Yishuv leadership whether, in the event Nazi occupation was to take place, the inhabitants of the Yishuv should evacuate together with British forces eastwards towards British possessions in Iraq and India or undertake a Masada-like last stand in Palestine, likely doing so in a fortified zone to be hastily constructed around the Carmel Mountains. This military operation was officially named Palestine Final Fortress. Fortunately for the Yishuv, the advance of German forces eastwards in Egypt was halted during the Second Battle of El Alamein, thus lifting the threat of invasion from the south. The anxious time leading to the Nazi loss at El Alamein became known as the 200 days of dread. With the threat of invasion having passed, the British moved to dismantle the Palmach, which subsequently went underground.

===== The Biltmore declaration =====
Despite the reports of Nazi atrocities and the desperation of Jews needing a safe haven the British kept the gates of Palestine almost closed to Jewish immigration. The Zionist leaders met at the Biltmore Hotel in New York in May 1942 and called for unrestricted Jewish immigration and the establishment of a Jewish commonwealth.

==== Mandatory Palestine post World War II ====
Hundreds of thousands of Holocaust survivors were being held in Displaced Persons Camp (DP Camps) aching to go to Mandatory Palestine. The British received much international pressure, specifically from U.S. president Harry Truman, to change their policy on immigration. Despite Britain's dependence on American economic aid, the British refused, claiming that they were experiencing too much resistance from the Arabs and Jews already in Palestine and feared what would happen if more were allowed to enter. The refusal to remove the white paper policy angered and radicalized the Yishuv. The Yishuv's militia groups set out to sabotage the British infrastructure in Palestine and continue in their illegal immigration efforts. In 1946, the British responded to the Yishuv's efforts and began a two-week search for Jews suspected of anti-British activities, arresting many of the Haganah's leaders. While the British were busy looking for the Haganah, the Irgun and Lehi carried out attacks on British forces. The most famous of their attacks was on the King David Hotel, the site of the British military command and the British Criminal Investigation Division. This location was chosen because a few weeks before a large quantity of documents was confiscated from the Haganah and brought there. Despite being warned by the Yishuv and told to evacuate the building the British officials decided not to cave in to the pressure. The Yishuv attacked anyway, resulting in 91 deaths, 28 of who were British and 17 who were Palestinian Jews.

By 1947 the British had 100,000 troops in Palestine trying to maintain order and protect themselves. The British mandate was a major expense to the Exchequer, forcing them to present the Palestine problem to the United Nations on 15 May 1947. The United Nations proposed a partition of the British Mandate for Palestine into two states—Arab and Jewish (UN Resolution 181). The Jews accepted it, while the Arabs stated that they would do everything in their power to prevent it.

The AHC, determined to prevent Resolution 181 from coming into effect, began to attack and besiege the Jews. The British sided with the Arabs in an attempt to prevent the Yishuv from arming themselves. Jerusalem was held under a siege with no access to weapons, food or water. The Provisional Government seemed helpless until it received a large shipment of arms from Czechoslovakia. The Haganah started fighting offensively from April through May. The Haganah mounted a full-scale military plan, Operation Nachshon. After much fighting and the crucial construction of a new road from Tel Aviv to Jerusalem, the siege of Jerusalem was broken, allowing supplies to be brought into the city.

This operation's success helped Harry S. Truman recognize that the Jews would be able to protect themselves. The United States decided therefore, it would support the establishment of a Jewish state. On 14 May 1948, the Jews proclaimed the independent state of Israel and the British withdrew from Palestine.

=== Evacuations and expulsions of Jews under the British Mandate ===
The 1920 Nabi Musa riots left four Arabs and five Jews killed, with 216 Jews and 23 Arabs wounded. The majority of the victims were members of the old Yishuv. About 300 Jews from the Old City were evacuated following the riots.

During the Jaffa riots in 1921, thousands of Jewish residents of Jaffa fled for Tel Aviv and were temporarily housed in tent camps on the beach. Tel Aviv, which had previously been lobbying for independent status, became a separate city due in part to the riots. However Tel Aviv was still dependent on Jaffa, which supplied it with food and services, and was the place of employment for most residents of the new city.

Following the 1929 Palestine riots, which left 133 Jews dead, the Jewish community members of Gaza and Hebron were ordered to evacuate by the British forces, in fear of their security.

During the Arab revolt of 1936–1939, the Jewish residents of Akko were ousted from the city by local Arab residents. The same fate was forced on the ancient Jewish community of Peki'in.

== See also ==
- Eastern Sephardim
- History of Israel
- Jewish exodus from Arab countries
- Mizrahi Jews
- Palestine Final Fortress
- Palestinian Jews
- Violent conflicts involving the Yishuv
