= Edwin E. Kintner =

American nuclear pioneer & engineer (1920–2010)

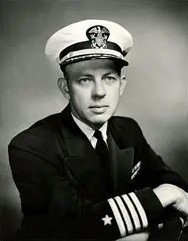
Capt. Edwin E. Kintner

Edwin Earl Kintner (May 1, 1920 – May 7, 2010) was an American nuclear pioneer and engineer and a U.S. Navy captain who was in charge of de-contamination of the Three Mile Island accident.

== Biography ==
Kintner was born on May 1, 1920, in Paris, Ohio.

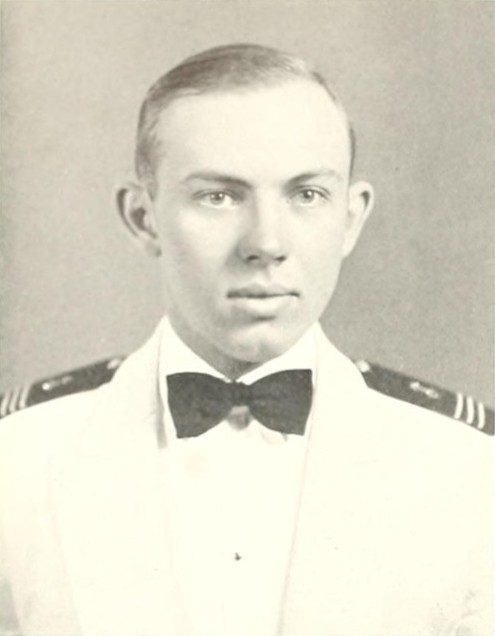
Kintner as a Naval Academy midshipman

Kintner graduated with a B.S. degree from the United States Naval Academy in Annapolis with the Class of 1942 on December 19, 1941. He subsequently earned a series of master's degrees in naval construction, ocean engineering, and physics at the Massachusetts Institute of Technology. Kintner completed his first M.S. degree in naval architecture and marine engineering advised by Ascher H. Shapiro in 1946.

After World War II, Kintner was selected by Vice Admiral Hyman G. Rickover to serve on a secret Navy team that developed the experimental reactor used in the first nuclear-powered submarine, the Nautilus. He completed his second M.S. degree in physics focused on nuclear engineering advised by Clark Goodman in 1950. Kintner was promoted to captain effective July 1, 1951.

After he retired from the Navy in August 1963, Kintner had a distinguished career in the public sector, serving on the senior staff of the U.S. Atomic Energy Commission (AEC) and later as the head of the Department of Energy's fusion program, where he oversaw the construction of reactors and the development of nuclear power as an alternate source of energy.

His scientific role at the AEC led to his involvement in the Israeli nuclear program. On at least two occasions between 1968 and 1969, Kintner was member of the U.S. inspection teams sent to Israel to ascertain the nature of the Israeli nuclear reactor at Dimona. During the inspection process, he earned a reputation as a no-nonsense inspector.

In 1983, Kintner was appointed the executive vice president of General Public Utilities Nuclear Corporation, which owns the Three Mile Island nuclear power plant. In his capacity as executive vice president, Kintner oversaw the remaining cleanup of the damaged reactor and worked to standardize nuclear reactor training and operations. In 1990, Kinther was elected to the National Academy of Engineering "for significant contributions to the development of nuclear submarine propulsion, nuclear power operation, and management of magnetic fusion programs."

Kintner died from prostate cancer in Exeter, New Hampshire on May 7, 2010. He was interred at Arlington National Cemetery on September 10, 2010.

== Bibliography ==
Cohen, Avner. "The Avner Cohen Collection." Edwin E. Kintner. NPIHP, The Woodrow Wilson Center for International Scholars, 03 Oct. 2013. Web. 05 Nov. 2013. <http://www.wilsoncenter.org/edwin-e-kintner>.

== Additional Sources ==
Interview with Edwin Kintner by Avner Cohen at The Nuclear Proliferation International History Project.
