= Aristaces Azaria =

Armenian Catholic abbot and archbishop

Aristaces Azaria, M.O.M.V. (b. at Constantinople, 18 July 1782; d. at Vienna, 6 May 1854), was an Armenian Catholic abbot and archbishop.

== Life ==
Azaria was sent at the age of fifteen to the Collegio Urbano of Propaganda Fidei in Rome, but his studies were interrupted in 1798 by the invasion of Italy by the French Revolutionary Army. He fled Rome and took refuge at the monastery of the Armenian Mechitarists of Trieste, and entered their Order in 1801. In the same year he was ordained a Catholic priest.

The authorities of the short-lived Kingdom of Illyria, set up as a client state of the Austrian Empire, confiscated the property of his monastery in 1810. After futile attempts to obtain restitution, the monks moved to Austria and established the Mekhitarist Monastery of Vienna. There they lived by the instruction of Armenian youth and the revenue from a printing press they set up to provide liturgical and scholarly books in the Armenian language. Azaria was henceforth active as a missionary among his compatriots and a servant of the Holy See.

In 1826 he was made Abbot General of the Order, and in 1827 he was named the Titular Archbishop of Caesarea. Under him the Mechitarist community in Vienna prospered, its library was increased, a bookstore added to the printing press, and an abundant religious literature created, in Armenian and in German. Azaria opened houses of his community in Rome, Triest, and Stamboul, founded the Armenian journal Europa, established an academy for the literary and political improvement of his people, and in 1830 obtained from the Holy See the creation of an independent Catholic Armenian patriarchate. After a visit to Rome (1850) in the interest of monastic reform, he returned to Vienna (1852) where he died after the celebration of his golden jubilee.

== Works ==
Azaria wrote several works, among them De Vitâ Communi Perfecta Religiosorum Utriusque Sexus, in which he criticizes the condition of many Austrian religious houses, and Die Erziehung im Geiste des Christenthumes (Vienna, 1839).
