= Rosa Welt-Straus =

Suffragist and feminist

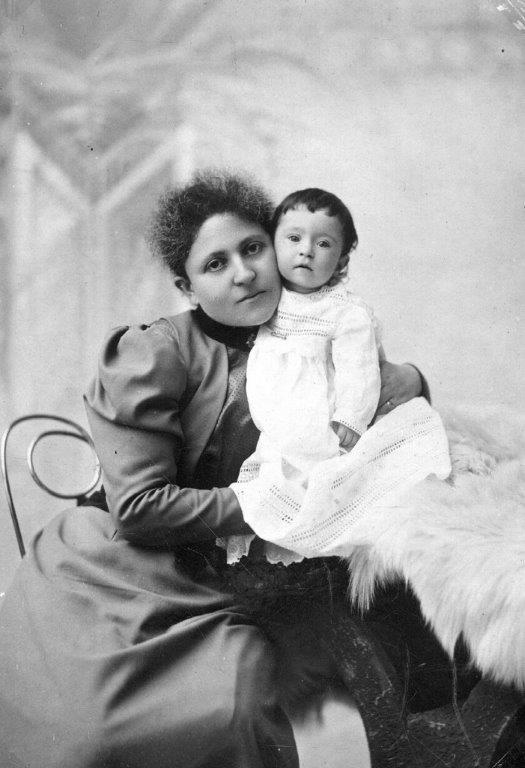
- Rosa Welt-Straus, 1893
- Born: 24 August 1856; Austrian Empire
- Died: 15 December 1938 (aged 82); Geneva, Switzerland
- Education: University of Bern
- Occupations: Ophthalmologist, Suffragist
- Spouse: Louis Straus

Rosa Welt-Straus (1856–1938) was a suffragist and feminist. Born in the Austrian Empire, she was the first girl in that country to graduate from high school, and the first Austrian woman to earn a medical degree, as well as the first female eye doctor in Europe.

She earned her medical degree in 1878 from the University of Bern. She had three sisters, Ida, Leonora, and Sara. After she and one of her sisters came to America, she worked as an eye surgeon in the eye hospital and the Women's Hospital in New York. She married businessman Louis Straus and had a daughter, Nellie Straus-Mochenson. In 1904, she participated in the first congress of the International Woman Suffrage Alliance as a member of the American delegation. She continued to participate as such for some time, and later represented the Union of Hebrew Women for Equal Rights in Eretz Israel at these assemblies.

In 1919 the first nationwide women's party in the New Yishuv (the Union of Hebrew Women for Equal Rights in Erez Israel) was created, and Welt-Straus, who had immigrated there that year, was appointed its leader, which she continued as until her death. In July 1920 she traveled to London to participate in the assembly at which the Women's International Zionist Organization (WIZO) was established, and later that year she represented the Union of Hebrew Women for Equal Rights in Eretz Israel at the International Woman Suffrage Alliance congress in Geneva. She represented the International Woman Suffrage Alliance on international committees, participated in all its Congresses, and was often included in delegations to the prime ministers of the countries which held the congresses.

In 1926 the haredim, who preferred not to face the possibility of a plebiscite, left the yishuv's Assembly of Representatives, and that year an official declaration was made (ratified by the mandate government in 1927) confirming "equal rights to women in all aspects of life in the yishuv – civil, political, and economic." Welt-Straus died in Geneva in 1938.
