= Avraham Hermoni =

Israeli chemist

Avraham Hermoni (Hebrew: אברהם חרמוני; May 10, 1926- June 24, 2006) was an Israeli chemist, government official, scientific counselor in the Israeli embassy in Washington, and a senior technical director at RAFAEL, Israel's national center for weapons development.

== Biography ==
Hermoni's involvement in the Israeli nuclear program was instrumental to its ultimate success. Between 1959 and 1969 he served as technical director (equivalent to vice president) at RAFAEL. His main duties included overseeing and planning RAFAEL's work on Israel's nuclear weapons.

== Bibliography ==
- Cohen, Avner. "The Avner Cohen Collection." Avraham Hermoni. The Woodrow Wilson Center for International Scholars, 03 Oct. 2013. Web. 05 Nov. 2013.
