= Onnik Der Azarian =

Ottoman Armenian painter (1883–1935)

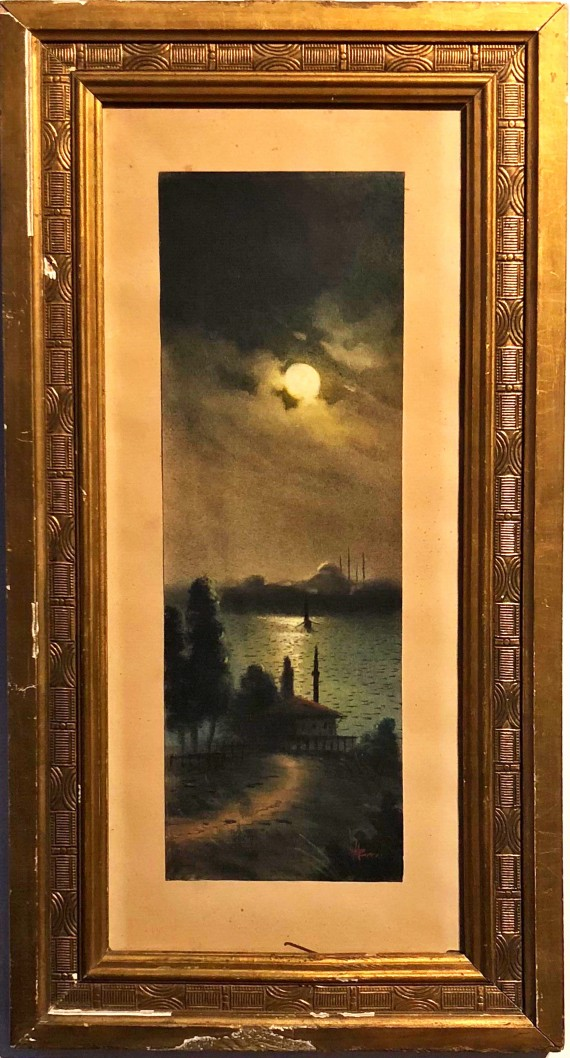

Onnik Der Azarian (Armenian: Օնիկ Տեր Ազարյան; 1883–1935) was an Ottoman Armenian painter.

Born in İzmit, Azarian's father Hagop Der Azarian owned a printing house and bindery and was well known in the area. The painter Sarkis Der Azarian was his paternal uncle. After working at his father's printing house for some time, he moved to Istanbul in April 1914 and worked at the Gazmararyan printing house during the 1920s, meanwhile working at his painting in his spare time. He married the artist Eugenie Telyan. With whom he had a child Samuel Der Azarian who married Marguerite Balian. They will have two children, Annie and Jean Pierre Der Azarian who had a daughter (Mélanie Der Azarian) and a son (Thomas Der Azarian). Mélanie had 3 children, Lucas, Romane, Johan. Thomas had 3 children Léna, Raphaël, Alexandre. His paintings and those of his friend Zareh Moskofyan were exhibited or placed on sale in various shops, including that of Max Fruchtermann on Grand rue de Pera (today Istiklal Caddesi) in Galatasaray, and during the 1930s at Foto iskender near Inci Cinema in Pangalti. For commercial reasons he signed some of his watercolours 'O. Azaroff'. He died in 1935 and was buried in the Nisan Yorganciyan burial ground in Uzuncayir Cemetery in Kadıköy.
