= Palestine Final Fortress =

British plan for the defence of Palestine during World War II

Coordinates: 32°44′57″N 35°01′39″E

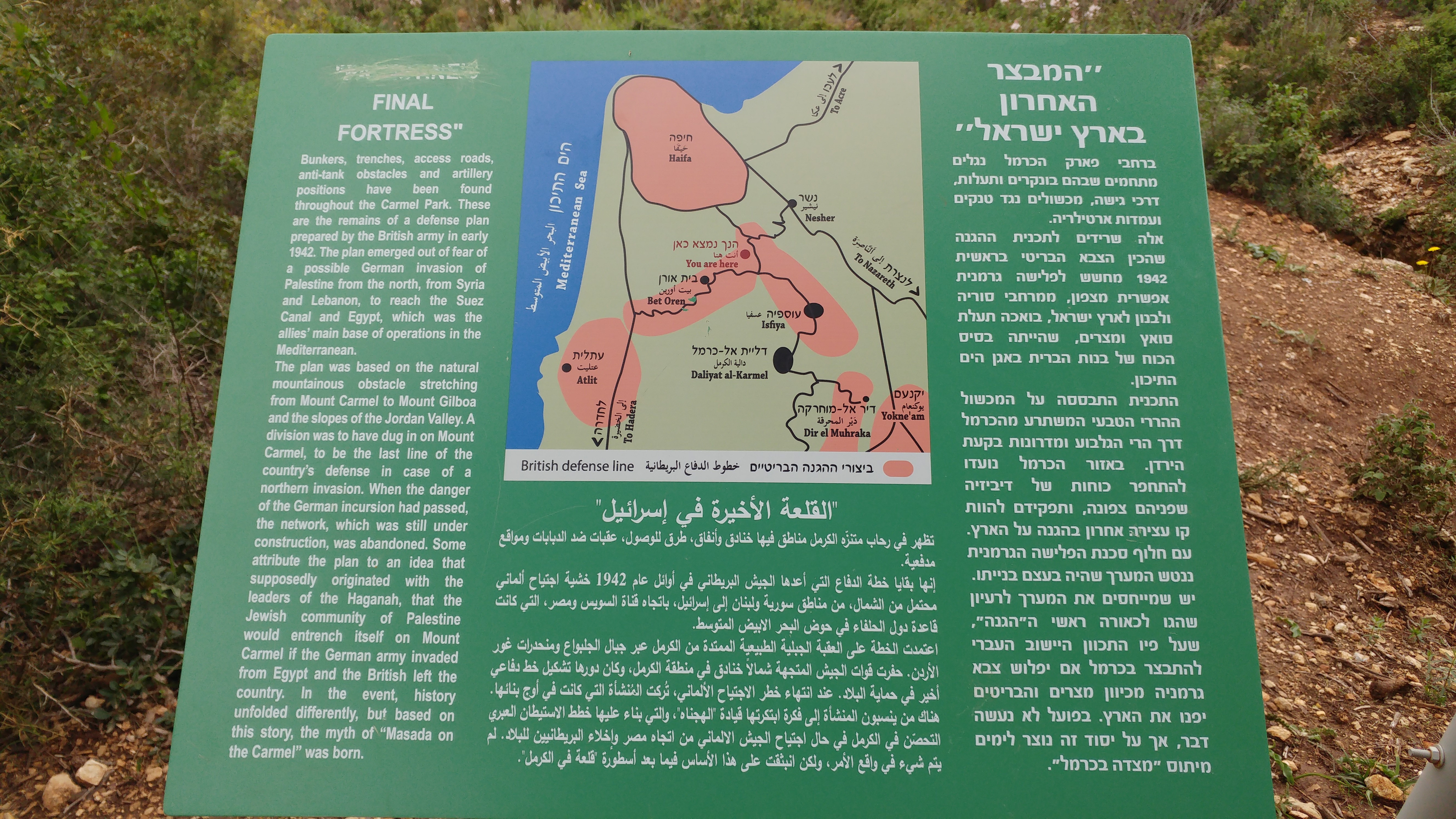
Final Fortress map (with the word Palestine vandalised)

Palestine Final Fortress (Hebrew: תוכנית המבצר האחרון לארץ ישראל or Final Fortress For The Land Of Israel) was the British 1942 defence plan for Mandatory Palestine at World War II against a possible German invasion from the north.

== History ==
During World War II, Mandatory Palestine twice faced the danger of invasion by the German army and its allies. The first began when Nazi Germany conquered France in June 1940 and the rise of the pro-Nazi regime of Vichy France, which controlled Lebanon and Syria. This made the possibility of a German invasion from the north highly probable. That summer, the British armed forces started preparing a defence line against invasions from the north.

The following year, between June and July 1941, the British captured Lebanon and Syria from Vichy France. However, this had not removed the threat of a major German invasion from the north, as the British believed that the Red Army might not hold the line against Nazi Germany. Even though the defence line in the Soviet Union had been stabilized, the British made a strategic plan for the retreating troops out of Syria to be assembled in the mountainous region between Mount Carmel and the Jordan Rift Valley. This topography was believed to be effective against the Nazi German tank force (Panzerwaffe). This plan was referred to as Palestine Final Fortress (PFF) of "Defence of the Last Position Palestine". In early 1942, the British declared the Mount Carmel region a closed military area and began massive infrastructure work.

In 1942, the threat of a German invasion from the south increased with the Afrika Korps advance into Egypt. Yishuv leaders discussed plans to defend against genocide of the Jewish population by the German army and by local Nazi supporters among the Arab population, which was expected in the event of British retreat from Palestine. The Haganah's "Plan of the North" included use of Palestine Final Fortress structures. The Yishuv also called their plan "Masada on the Carmel" and "Haifa-Masada-Musa Dagh". Although the Yishuv had cause for worry during the 200 days of dread, no further actions were taken by the British nor by the Yishuv to prepare against possible invasion by the Axis powers. In late 1942, the threat of invasion from the south was lifted following the Allied victory in the Second Battle of El Alamein and the subsequent German retreat westwards across North Africa.

== See also ==
- 200 days of dread
- History of Palestine
