= Azria =

Azria is a surname. Notable people with the surname include:

- Lubov Azria (born 1967), French fashion designer
- Max Azria (1949–2019), Tunisia-born fashion designer
- René-Pierre Azria (born 1956), French businessman

== See also ==
- Aria (name)
