= Arnan Azaryahu =

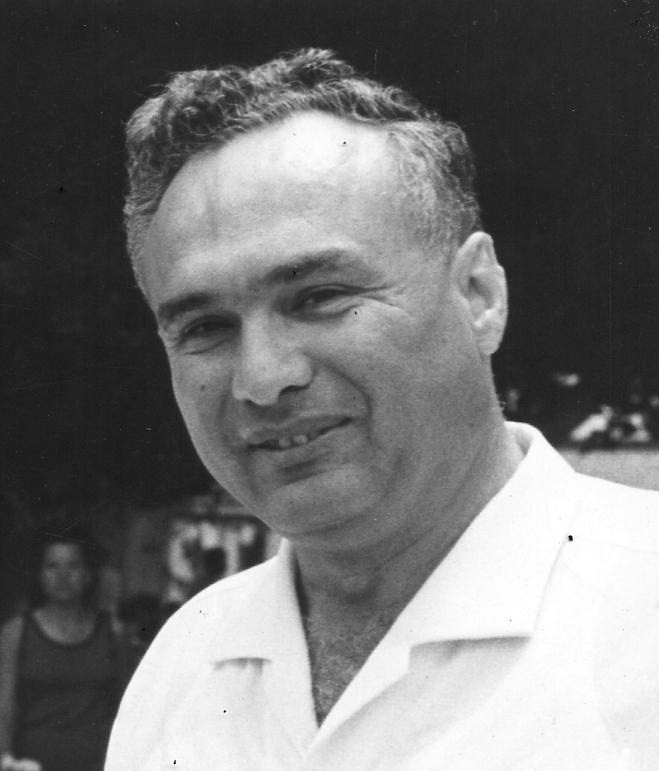
Arnan Azaryahu

Arnan "Sini" Azaryahu (26 June 1917 – 26 November 2008) was a long-time political insider within the Israeli government, where he served as a trusted aide and confidant to Minister Yisrael Galili, a close ally and advisor to Israeli prime minister Golda Meir.

== Biography ==
Arnan "Sini" Azaryahu was an officer in the general staff of the Palmach, a leader in the HaKibbutz HaMeuhad movement, and later a senior aide and confidant to Minister Yisrael Galili.

Sini was born in 1917 in Haifa to Sarah and Yosef Azaryahu, teachers and Zionists who were among the founders of Tel Aviv. In 1941, Sini was recruited by the Palmach, a Mandate-era Jewish fighting force. He was cultural and education officer just two years later, a position that he held until the Palmach's dissolution in 1949. Sini also served as Galili's adjutant officer while he was head of the national headquarters of the Haganah, a Jewish defense organization during the British Mandate that became the backbone of the Israeli Defense Force after independence. He held the same position under General Yigal Allon along the southern front of the 1948 Palestine war. After independence, Sini joined the secretariat of the Hakibbutz Hameuchad, a part of the Kibbutz Movement associated with the Ahdut HaAvoda party. He became an envoy to the United States in this capacity in the late 1950s.

Though Sini was not a member of the narrow group around Prime Minister Ben Gurion that had given birth to the Israeli nuclear program, his close relationship with many top Israeli security officials, especially Meir Mardor and Galili, gave him an inside look at some key junctions in Israel's nuclear history. In 1962 Sini prepared a memo for Galili for the first closed-door Israeli top-level strategic conference on the nuclear program that Ben Gurion conducted. The compromise policy that Ben Gurion ultimately adopted in the wake of that conference may have planted the seeds of Israel's nuclear opacity policy. Sini also often discussed nuclear issues in meetings with officials, such as his conversations with Munya Mardor, the director of RAFAEL, after the Six-Day War, and with Galili before and after the Yom Kippur War of 1973.

After the Likud party gained power in 1977, Sini left his role in the government. Two years later, he founded the Galilee Center in Yad Tabenkin, which focused on security issues. Sini died in November 2008.

== Bibliography ==
- Cohen, Avner. "The Avner Cohen Collection." Arnan "Sini" Azaryahu. The Woodrow Wilson Center for International Scholars, 3 Oct. 2013. Web. 05 Nov. 2013. .
