= Chinese name =

- "Xingming" in Chinese characters
- Chinese: 姓名
- Hanyu Pinyin: xìngmíng
- Literal meaning: family name – given name
Transcriptions
Standard Mandarin
- Hanyu Pinyin: xìngmíng
- Bopomofo: ㄒㄧㄥˋ ㄇㄧㄥˊ
- Gwoyeu Romatzyh: shinqming
- Wade–Giles: hsing^{4}-ming^{2}
- IPA: [ɕîŋmǐŋ]
Yue: Cantonese
- Yale Romanization: sing-mìhng
- Jyutping: sing3-ming4
Southern Min
- Tâi-lô: sènn-miâ

Chinese names are names used by individuals from Greater China and other parts of the Sinophone world. Sometimes the same set of Chinese characters could be chosen as a Chinese name, a Hong Kong name, a Japanese name, a Korean name, a Han Taiwanese name, a Malaysian Chinese name, or a Vietnamese name, but they would be spelled differently due to their varying historical pronunciation of Chinese characters.

Modern Chinese names generally have a one-character family name (姓氏; xìngshì) followed by an individual name (名; míng), which may be either one or two characters in length. In recent decades, two-character individual names are much more commonly chosen; studies during the 2000s and 2010s estimated that over three-quarters of China's population at the time had two-character individual names, with the remainder almost exclusively having one character.

Prior to the 21st century, most educated Chinese men also used a courtesy name ("style name"; 字; zì) by which they were known among those outside their family and closest friends. Respected artists or poets will sometimes also use a professional art name (号; 號; hào) among their social peers.

From at least the time of the Shang dynasty, the Chinese observed a number of naming taboos regulating who may or may not use a person's individual name (without being disrespectful), the use of which connoted the speaker's authority and superior position to the addressee. Peers and younger relatives were barred from speaking it. Owing to this, many historical Chinese figures, particularly emperors, used a half-dozen or more different names in different contexts and for different speakers. Those possessing names (sometimes even mere homophones) identical to the emperor's were frequently forced to change them. The normalization of personal names after the May Fourth Movement has generally eradicated aliases such as the school name and courtesy name, but traces of the old taboos remain, particularly within families.

== History ==
Although some terms from the ancient Chinese naming system, such as xìng (姓) and míng (名), are still used today, it used to be much more complex.

In the first half of the 1st millennium BC, during the Zhou dynasty, members of the Chinese nobility could possess up to four different names—personal names (míng 名), clan names (xìng 姓), lineage names (shì 氏), and "style" or "courtesy" names (zì 字)— as well as up to two titles: standard titles (jué 爵), and posthumous titles (shì 諡; 谥 or shìhào 諡號; 谥号).

Commoners possessed only a personal name (ming), and the modern concept of a "surname" or "family name" did not yet exist at any level of society. The old lineage (shi) and clan names (xing) began to become "family names" in the modern sense and trickle down to commoners around 500 BC, during the late Spring and Autumn period, but the process took several centuries to complete, and it was not until the late Han dynasty (1st and 2nd centuries AD) that all Chinese commoners had surnames.

== Family names ==
Although there are currently over 6,000 Chinese surnames including non-Han Chinese surnames (姓; xìng) in use in China, the colloquial expression for the "Chinese people" is Bǎixìng (百姓) "Hundred Surnames", and a mere hundred surnames still make up over 85% of China's 1.3 billion citizens. The three most common surnames, Wang (王), Li (李), and Zhang (張; 张), cover more than 20% of the population. This homogeneity results from the great majority of Han family names having only one character, while the small number of compound surnames is mostly restricted to minority groups. The most common compound surname still in use in ethnic Han families is Ouyang.

Chinese surnames arose from two separate prehistoric traditions: the xìng (姓) and the shì (氏). The original xìng were clans of royalty at the Shang court and always included the ⼥ 'WOMAN' radical. The shì did not originate from families, but denoted fiefs, states, and titles granted or recognized by the Shang court. Apart from the Jiang (姜) and Yao (姚) families, the original xìng have nearly disappeared but the terms ironically reversed their meaning. Xìng is now used to describe the shì surnames which replaced them, while shì is used to refer to maiden names.

The enormous modern clans sometimes share ancestral halls with one another, but actually consist of many different lineages gathered under a single name. As an example, the surname Ma (馬; 马) includes descendants of the Warring States–era bureaucrat Zhao She, descendants of his subjects in his fief of Mafu, Koreans from an unrelated confederation, and Muslims from western China who chose it to honor Muhammad.

Traditionally, a married woman keeps her name unchanged, without adopting her husband's surname. A child would inherit their father's surname. This is still the norm in mainland China, though the marriage law explicitly states that a child may use either parent's surname. It is also possible, though far less common, for a child to combine both parents' surnames. Due to Western influence, the tradition of a woman changing her surname, or prepending her husband's to her own, is reflected in some Hong Kong names and Macao names, such as Lam Cheng Yuet-ngor, whose original surname was Cheng and the surname Lam was legally added from her husband Lam Siu-por after marriage.

== Given names ==
Given names show much greater diversity than the surnames, while still being restricted almost universally to one or two syllables. Including variant forms, there are at least 106,000 individual Chinese characters, but as of 2006, in the People's Republic of China Public Security Bureau only approximately 32,000 are supported for computer input and even fewer are in common use. Given names are chosen based on a range of factors, including possession of pleasing sound and tonal qualities, as well as bearing positive associations or a beautiful shape. Two-character ming may be chosen for each character's separate meaning and qualities, but the name remains a single unit which is almost always said together even when the combination no longer 'means' anything.

Today, two-character given names are more common and make up more than 80% of Chinese given names. However, this custom has been consistent only since the Ming dynasty. About 70% of all given names were only one character long during the early Han and that rose beyond 98% after the usurping Wang Mang banned all two-character given names outright. Although his Xin dynasty was short-lived, the law was not repealed until 400 years later, when northern invasions and interest in establishing lineages revived interest in such longer names. The Tang and Song saw populations with a majority of two-character given names for the first time, but the Liao between them and the Yuan afterward both preferred single character given names. The restoration of Han dominance under the Ming, promotion of Han culture under the Qing, and development of generation names established the current traditions. A generation name is a single character, one of the two characters of a given name, and is shared by all siblings and paternal cousins of the same generation.

Given names resonant of qualities which are perceived to be either masculine or feminine are frequently given, with males being linked with strength and firmness and females with beauty and flowers. It is also more common for female names to employ diminutives like Xiǎo or doubled characters in their formal names, although there are famous male examples such as Deng Xiaoping and Yo-Yo Ma. People from the countryside previously often bore names that reflect rural life—for example, Daniu (大牛, lit. "Big Bull") and Dazhu (大柱, lit. "Big Pole")—but such names are becoming less common.

It is also considered bad form to name a child after a famous person, although tens of thousands might happen to share a common name such as "Liu Xiang". Similarly, owing to the traditional naming taboos, it is very uncommon in China to name a child directly after a relative, since such children would permit junior family members to inappropriately use the personal names of senior ones. Ancestors can leave a different kind of mark: Chinese naming schemes often employ a generation name. Every child recorded into the family records in each generation would share an identical character in their names. Sixteen, thirty-two, or more generations would be worked out in advance to form a generation poem. For example, the one selected in 1737 for the family of Mao Zedong read:

立顯榮朝士 Stand tall & display unstintingly before gentlemen,
文方運濟祥 And study & method will expand the borders of our fortune.
祖恩貽澤遠 Ancestral favors bequeath kindness through the ages,
世代永承昌 Descendants forever obliged for their prosperity.

This scheme was in its fourteenth generation when Mao rejected it for the naming of his own children, preferring to give his sons the generational name An (岸, lit. "Lofty", "Proud") instead. A similar practice was observed regarding the stage names of Chinese opera performers: all the students entering a training academy in the same year would adopt the same first character in their new "given name". For example, as part of the class entering the National Drama School in 1933, Li Yuru adopted a name with the central character "jade" (玉).

Depending on the region and particular family, daughters were not entered into the family records and thus did not share the boys' generation name, although they may have borne a separate one among themselves. Even where generation names are not used, sibling names are frequently related. For example, a boy named Song (松; 'pine tree') might have a sister named Mei (梅; 'plum'). In some families, the siblings' names have the same radical. For example, in the Jia (賈) clan in Dream of the Red Chamber, a novel mirroring the rise and decline of the Qing dynasty, there is Zheng (政), She (赦), and Min (敏) in the first generation, Lian (璉), Zhen (珍), and Huan (環) in the second, and Yun (芸), Qin (芹), and Lan (蘭) in the third.

More recently, although generation names have become less common, many personal names reflect periods of Chinese history. For example, following the victory of the Communists in the Civil War, many Chinese bore "revolutionary names" such as Qiangguo (強國; 强国; 'strong nation', 'strengthening the nation') or Dongfeng (東風; 东风; 'eastern wind'). Similarly, in Taiwan, it used to be common to incorporate one of the four characters of the name "Republic of China" (中華民國; 中华民国; Zhōnghuá Mínguó) into masculine names. Periodic fad names like Aoyun (奥运; 奧運; "Olympics") also appear. Owing to both effects, there has also been a recent trend in China to hire fortune tellers to change people's names to new ones more in accordance with traditional Taoist and five element practices. In creating a new Chinese name, it is sometimes the practice to analyze the number of strokes in the characters used in the potential name and attempt to use characters that produce specific totals of strokes.

== Spelling ==
The process of converting Chinese names into a phonetic alphabet is called romanization.

In mainland China, Chinese names have been romanized using the Hanyu Pinyin system since 1958. Although experiments with the complete conversion of Chinese to the Pinyin alphabet failed, it remains in common use and has become the transcription system of the United Nations and the International Organization for Standardization. Taiwan officially adopted Hanyu Pinyin as one of their romanisation schemes in 2009, although it continues to allow its citizens to use other romanisations on official documents such as passports, of which Hanyu Pinyin remains unpopular. The system is easily identified by its frequent use of letters uncommon in English, such as "q", "x", and "z"; when tones are included, they are noted via tone marks. In Pinyin, 毛泽东 is written as Máo Zédōng.

Proper use of Pinyin means treating the surname and given name as precisely two separate words with no spaces between the letters of multiple Chinese characters. For example, "王秀英" is properly rendered either with its tone marks as "Wáng Xiùyīng" or without as "Wang Xiuying", but should not be written as "Wang Xiu Ying", "Wang XiuYing", "Wangxiuying", and so on. In the rare cases where a surname consists of more than one character, it too should be written as a unit: "Sima Qian", not "Si Ma Qian" or "Si Maqian". However, as the Chinese language makes almost no use of spaces, native speakers often do not know these rules and simply put a space between each Chinese character of their name, causing those used to alphabetical languages to think of the xing and ming as three words instead of two. Tone marks are also commonly omitted in practice.

Many overseas Chinese, Taiwanese and historic names still employ the older Wade–Giles system. This English-based system can be identified by its use of the digraphs "hs" (pinyin x) and "ts" (pinyin z and c) and by its use of hyphens to connect the syllables of words containing more than one character. Correct reading depends on the inclusion of superscript numbers and the use of apostrophes to distinguish between different consonants, but in practice both of these are commonly omitted. In Wade–Giles, 毛泽东 is written as Mao Tse-tung, as the system hyphenates names between the characters. For example, Wang Xiuying and Sima Qian are written in Wade as "Wang^{2} Hsiu^{4}-ying^{1}" and "Ssu^{1}Ma^{3} Ch'ien^{1}".

Pinyin and Wade–Giles both represent the pronunciation of Mandarin, based on the Beijing dialect. In Hong Kong, Macau, and the diaspora communities in southeast Asia and abroad, people often romanize their names according to their own native language, for example, Cantonese, Hokkien, and Hakka. This occurs amid a plethora of competing romanization systems. During British colonial rule, some adopted English spelling conventions for their Hong Kong names: "Lee" for 李, "Shaw" for 邵, and so forth. In Macau, Chinese names are similarly sometimes still transliterated based on Portuguese orthography and Jyutping. It is common practice for the Chinese diaspora communities to use spaces in between each character of their name.

== Different names with the same spelling ==
Although they come from different Chinese characters, it is common for many different Chinese names to have the same transliteration whether tone is marked or not.

For example, English spelling of the Chinese given name Ming has many different associated Chinese characters, all of which have different meanings. Therefore, when the name is written in Chinese, a person called Ming can have a completely different name from another person who is also called Ming.

Most mings share the same form between simplified and traditional Chinese.

- 明 (meaning: bright, intelligent)
- 名 (meaning: reputation)
- 銘（铭）(meaning: poetic motto, inscribe)
- 茗 (meaning: tea)
- 命 (meaning: life, destiny)
- 鳴（鸣）(meaning: sing)

== Alternative names ==
From their earliest recorded history, the Chinese observed a number of naming taboos, avoiding the names of their elders, ancestors, and rulers out of respect and fear. As a result, the upper classes of traditional Chinese culture typically employed a variety of names over the course of their lives, and the emperors and sanctified deceased had still others.

Current naming practices are more straightforward and consistent, but a few pseudonyms or alternate names remain common.

When discussing Chinese writers, Chinese and Japanese scholars do not consistently use particular names, whether they are private names or alternative names.

Chinese names for prominent people Example: Sun Yat-sen
Official name	Sūn Démíng (孫德明)
Milk name	Sūn Dìxiàng (孫帝象)
School name:	Sūn Wén (孫文)
Caricatural name:	unknown
Courtesy names:	Sūn Zàizhī (孫載之)
Christian (baptised) name:	Sūn Rìxīn (孫日新, 1883, Hong Kong) = Syūn Yahtsān (Cantonese)
Pseudonym(s):	Sūn Yìxiān (孫逸仙, 1883, Hong Kong) = Syūn Yahtsīn (Cantonese); Sun Yat-sen (English, 1883, Hong Kong and the West); Nakayama Shō (中山樵, 1897, Japanese); Sūn Zhōngshān (孫中山, 1912, China)
Posthumous name:	Guófù (國父)
Temple name:	none (Note: Used only for royalty and Emperors)
Era name:	none (Note: Used only to distinguish years of royalty or Emperor's reigns)

=== Milk name ===
Traditionally, babies were named a hundred days after their birth; modern naming laws in the People's Republic of China grant the parents a month before requiring the baby to be registered. Upon birth, the parents often use a "milk name" (乳名; rǔmíng, 小名; xiǎomíng)—typically employing diminutives like 小; xiǎo (lit. 'little') or doubled characters—before a formal name is settled upon, often in consultation with the grandparents. The milk name may be abandoned but is often continued as a form of familial nickname. A tradition sometimes attached to the milk name is to select an unpleasant name, to ward off demons who might wish to harm the child.

=== Nickname ===
Nicknames (綽號; 绰号; chuòhào, 外號; 外号; wàihào) are acquired in much the same way they are in other countries. Not everyone has one. Most that do received theirs in childhood or adolescence from family or friends. Common Chinese nicknames are those based on a person's physical attributes, speaking style, or behavior. Names involving animals are common, although those animals may be associated with different attributes than they are in English: for example, Chinese cows are strong, not stupid; foxes are devious, not clever; pigs are lazy, but not dirty. Similarly, nicknames that might seem especially insulting in English—such as "Little Fatty" (小胖)—are more acceptable in Chinese. One especially common method of creating nicknames is prefixing Ā- (阿) or Xiǎo (小) to the surname or the second character of the given name. Ā- is more common in the south and abroad, while Xiǎo is common throughout China. Both Ā- and Xiǎo are distinguished from Lǎo (老, "old" but see below for usage). Nicknames are rarely used in formal or semi-formal settings, although a famous exception is A-bian.

=== English alias in mainland China ===
English is taught throughout China's secondary schools and the English language section is a required component of the Gaokao, China's college entrance examination. Many Chinese teenagers thus acquire Western names, commonly of English origin, which they may keep and use as nicknames even in Chinese-language contexts. Chinese may adopt English names for a variety of reasons, including foreigners' difficulty with Chinese tones and better integration of people working in foreign enterprises. Established English names chosen by Chinese may also be those rarely used by native English speakers.

=== English alias in Chinese diaspora ===
Hong Kong names often feature an English alias. 25.8% of Hongkongers have English given names as part of their legal names; a further 38.3% of Hongkongers go by English given names even though those are not part of their legal names; the two figures add up to a total of 64.1% of Hongkongers having English names, according to a survey of 2049 respondents in 2015. More unusual names made and adopted by Hongkongers are created by modifying normal English names – either by deleting, inserting or substituting specific letters (e.g. Kith, Sonija, Garbie), or by emulating the phonetic sounds of the Chinese name (e.g. Hacken Lee from Lee Hak-kan. English aliases are widely used at schools, at work, and in social circles. This is probably due to the influence from the prolonged British rule of Hong Kong from 1841 to 1997.

In Malaysia and Singapore, it is equally acceptable for Western names to appear before or after the Chinese given name, in Latin characters. Thus, the Singaporean President Tony Tan might see his name written as "Tony Tan Keng Yam" or "Tan Keng Yam Tony". Individuals are free to register their legal names in either format on their identity cards. In general use, the English name first version is typically preferred as it keeps the correct order for both systems; however, for administrative purposes, the government agencies tend to place the English name last to organize lists of names and databases more easily, similar to the Western practice of organizing names with the last name first followed by a comma ("Smith, John"). In Singapore, there is an option to include the Chinese characters on one's National Registration Identity Card.

In Indonesia, one of the countries with the largest Chinese diaspora population, the Indonesian Chinese in Indonesia and in diaspora has mostly adopted Indonesian-sounding variations of Chinese names due to decades of regulation and acculturation. Conversely, the usage of these Indonesian-sounding Chinese names are not restricted for surnames, and many are used liberally between other surnames since many Indonesian Chinese did not keep track of their Chinese (sur)names anymore, and even used by non-Chinese people (with some names being borrowing from regional languages and names).

Among Chinese diaspora residing in Western countries, it is becoming common practice for parents to give their children a Western name as their official first name, with the Chinese given name being officially recorded as a middle name.

=== School name ===
The school name (學名; xuémíng) was a separate formal name used by the child while they were at school.

As binomial nomenclature is also called xuémíng in Chinese, the school name is also sometimes now referenced as the xùnmíng (訓名) to avoid confusion.

=== Courtesy name ===
Upon maturity, it was common for educated males to acquire a courtesy name (字, zì or 表字, biǎozì) either from one's parents, a teacher, or self-selection. The name commonly mirrored the meaning of one's given name or displayed his birth order within his family.

The practice was a consequence of admonitions in the Book of Rites that among adults it is disrespectful to be addressed by one's given name by others within the same generation. The true given name was reserved for the use of one's elders, while the courtesy name was employed by peers on formal occasions and in writing. The practice was decried by the May Fourth Movement and has been largely abandoned.

=== Pseudonym ===
Pseudonyms or aliases (号; hào) or pen names (笔名; bǐmíng) were self-selected alternative courtesy names, most commonly three or four characters long. They may have originated from too many people having the same courtesy name.

Some—but by no means most—authors do continue to employ stylized pen names. One example is the poet Zhao Zhenkai, whose pen name is "Bei Dao" (北岛; 'North Island').

=== Posthumous name ===
Posthumous names (諡號; shìhào) were honorary names selected after a person's death, used extensively for royalty. The common "names" of most Chinese emperors before the Tang dynasty—with the pointed exception of Shi Huangdi—are their posthumous ones. In addition to emperors, successful courtiers and politicians such as Sun Yat-sen also occasionally received posthumous titles.

=== Temple name ===
The temple name (廟號; miàohào) of the emperor inscribed on the spiritual tablets of the imperial ancestral temple often differed from his posthumous name. The structure eventually became highly restricted, consisting of a single adjective and either zǔ (祖) or zōng (宗). These common "names" of the emperors between the Tang and the Yuan are their temple ones.

=== Era name ===
The era name (年號; niánhào) arose from the custom of dating years by the reigns of the ruling emperors. Under the Han, the practice began of changing regnal names as means of dispensing with bad luck and attracting better. Almost all era names were literary and employed exactly two characters. By the Ming and Qing dynasties, emperors had largely dispensed with the practice and kept a single era name during their reign, such that it is customary to refer to Ming and Qing emperors by their era names.

== Forms of address ==
Within families, it is often considered inappropriate or even offensive to use the given names of relatives who are senior to the speaker. Instead, it is more customary to identify each family member by abstract hierarchical connections: among siblings, gender and birth order (big sister, second sister, and so on); for the extended family, the manner of relationship (by birth or marriage; from the maternal or paternal side).

The hierarchical titles of junior relatives are seldom used except in formal situations, or as indirect reference when speaking to family members who are even younger than the person in question. Children can be called by their given names, or their parents may use their nicknames.

When speaking of non-family social acquaintances, people are generally referred to by a title, for example Mother Li (Chinese: 李夫人; pinyin: lǐ fūrén) or Mrs. Zhu (朱太太, pinyin: zhū tàitai). Personal names can be used when referring to adult friends or to children, although, unlike in the West, referring to somebody by their full name (including surname) is common even among friends, especially if the person's full name is only composed of two or three syllables. It is common to refer to a person as lǎo (老, old) or xiǎo (小, young) followed by their family name, thus Lǎo Wáng (老王) or Xiǎo Zhāng (小张). Xiǎo is also frequently used as a diminutive, when it is typically paired with the second or only character in a person's name, rather than the surname. Because old people are well respected in Chinese society, lǎo (old) does not carry disrespect, offense or any negative implications even if it is used to refer to an older woman. Despite this, it is advisable for non-Chinese to avoid calling a person xiǎo-something or lǎo-something unless they are so-called by other Chinese people and it is clear that the appellation is acceptable and widely used. Otherwise, the use of the person's full name, or alternatively, their surname followed by xiānsheng (先生; 'mister'), nǚshì (女士; 'mistress'), or xiǎojiě (小姐; 'miss') is relatively neutral and unlikely to cause offense.

Within school settings and when addressing former classmates, it is common to refer to them as older siblings, e.g. elder brother Zhao (赵哥; Zhào Gē) or e.g. elder sister Zhang (张姐; Zhāng Jǐe) if they were of senior classes, or simply to show respect or closeness. The opposite (e.g. younger brother Zhao) is rarely used. This custom spawns from traditional forms of respectful address, where it was considered rude to directly address your seniors.

Whereas titles in many cultures are commonly solely determined by gender and, in some cases, marital status, the occupation or even work title of a person can be used as a title as a sign of respect in common address in Chinese culture. Because of the prestigious position of a teacher in traditional culture, a teacher is invariably addressed as such by their students (e.g. 李老师; Lǐ Lǎoshī; 'Teacher Li'), and commonly by others as a mark of respect. Where applicable, "Teacher Surname" is considered more respectful than "Mr/Mrs/Miss Surname" in Chinese. A professor is also commonly addressed as "teacher", though "professor" is also accepted as a respectful title. By extension, a junior or less experienced member of a work place or profession would address a more senior member as "Teacher".

Similarly, engineers are often addressed as such, though often shortened to simply the first character of the word "engineer" – Chinese: 工; pinyin: gōng. Should the person being addressed be the head of a company (or simply the middle manager of another company to whom you would like to show respect), one might equally address them by the title "zǒng" (总), which means "general" or "overall", and is the first character of titles such as "Director General" or "general manager" (e.g. 李总; Lǐ zǒng), or, if they are slightly lower down on the corporate hierarchy but nonetheless a manager, by affixing Jīnglǐ (经理, manager).

== Variations ==
=== Unusual names ===
Because the small number of Chinese surnames leads to confusion in social environments, and because some Chinese parents have a desire to give individuality, some Chinese have received unusual given names. As of April 2009, about 60 million Chinese people have unusual characters in their names. A 2006 report by the Chinese public security bureau stated that of about 55,000 Chinese characters used in the People's Republic of China, only 32,232 of those are supported by the ministry's computers. The PRC government has asked individuals with unusual names to change them so they can get new computer-readable public identity cards, and the diversity prevents them from receiving new identity cards if they do not change their names.

Beginning in at least 2003, the PRC government has been writing a list of standardized characters for everyday usage in life, which would be the pool of characters to select from when a child is given their name. Originally the limits were to go in place in 2005. In April 2009, the list had been revised 70 times, and it still has not been put into effect.

Wang Daliang, a China Youth University for Political Sciences linguistics scholar, said that "Using obscure names to avoid duplication of names or to be unique is not good. Now a lot of people are perplexed by their names. The computer cannot even recognize them and people cannot read them. This has become an obstacle in communication." Zhou Youyong, the dean of the Southeast University law school, argued that the ability to choose the name of one's children is a fundamental right, so the PRC government should be careful when making new naming laws.

While the vast majority of Han Chinese names consist of two or three characters, there are some Han Chinese with longer names, up to 15 characters. In addition, transliteration of ethnic languages into Chinese characters often results in long names.

=== Taiwan ===
Han family names in Taiwan are similar to those in southeast China, as most families trace their origins to places such as Fujian and Guangdong. Indigenous Taiwanese have also been forced to adopt Chinese names as part of enforced Sinicization. The popularity distribution of family names in Taiwan as a whole differs somewhat from the distribution of names among all Han Chinese, with the family name Chen (陳) being particularly more common (about 11% in Taiwan, compared to about 3% in China). Local variations also exist.

Given names that consist of one character are much less common in Taiwan than in China.

A traditional practice, now largely supplanted, was choosing deliberately unpleasant given names to ward off bad omens and evil spirits. For example, a boy facing a serious illness might be renamed Ti-sái (豬屎, lit. "Pig Shit") to indicate to the evil spirits that he was not worth their trouble. Similarly, a girl from a poor family might have the name Bóng-chī (罔市, lit. "No Takers").

Nicknames (囝仔名, gín-á-miâ, "child names") are common and generally adopt the Southern Chinese practice of affixing the prefix "A-" (阿) to the last syllable of a person's name. Although these names are rarely used in formal contexts, there are a few public figures who are well known by their nicknames, including former president A-bian and the singer A-mei.

== Rendered in English ==
=== Word order ===
The English signature of Sun Yat-sen abided the Chinese naming order

For mainland Chinese, Western publications usually preserve the Chinese naming order, with the family name first, followed by the given name. This presentation of Chinese-character names is similar to those of Korean names; it differs from the presentation of Japanese names, which are usually reversed in English so they are family name last. For people with just a single given name or with compound surnames and a single given name, the western name order may add to the complication of confusing the surname and the given name.

The word order of Hong Kong names gets complicated when one has a legal English given name. For example, a person who has Kuo as his surname, Chi Yung as his Cantonese given name, and Peter as his legal English given name would have his name rendered as "KUO, Chi Yung Peter" on his Hong Kong identity card, however, the position and the use of a comma might be varied as "KUO Chi Yung Peter" or "KUO Chi Yung, Peter" on court papers. His name is much more likely to be printed as Peter Kuo Chi-yung (with a hyphen) or Peter Kuo on newspapers and academic journals.

=== Hyphen or spacing between given names ===
Traditional given names from Hongkonger, Macanese, Malaysian Chineses and Singaporean Chinese people in English usually expressed with spacing between characters (monosyllables), such as (Goh) Chok Tong, (Lee) Chong Wei,...

Unlike mainland Chinese, Taiwanese people usually place a hyphen between each two characters of the given name, similar to South Korean names. This is also the case for the standard styling of Hong Kong Chinese names, where the given name is hyphenated.

=== Comparison chart ===
Name	Mandarin (Pinyin)	Mandarin (Wade–Giles)	Non-Mandarin	Western ordering
Known by their Mainland pinyin names
汪精衛	Wang Jingwei	Wang Ching-wei	n/a	Jingwei Wang
Known by (or by derivatives of) their Wade–Giles names
胡適	Hu Shi	Hu Shih	n/a	Shih Hu
Known by native non-Mandarin romanised names
孫逸仙	Sun Yixian	Sun Yi-hsien	Sun Yat-sen	Yatsen Sun
胡文虎	Hu Wenhu	Hu Wen-hu	Aw Boon Haw	Boonhaw Aw
Known by their Western ordering names
邵仁枚	Shao Renmei	Shao Jen-mei	n/a	Runme Shaw
趙元任	Zhao Yuanren	Chao Yüan-jen	n/a	Yuen Ren Chao
Known by their initialized Western ordering names and/or native non-Mandarin romanization
顧維鈞	Gu Weijun	Ku Wei-chün	Koo Vi Kyuin	V. K. Wellington Koo
宋子文	Song Ziwen	Sung Tzu-wen	Soong Tse-vung	T. V. Soong
劉殿爵	Liu Dianjue	Liu Tien-chüeh	Lau Din Cheuk	D. C. Lau

According to the Chicago Manual of Style, Chinese names are indexed by the family name with no inversion and no comma, unless it is of a Chinese person who has adopted a Western name.

== In Japanese ==
In the Japanese language, Chinese names can be pronounced either approximating the original Chinese, the Local reading (現地読み) of the characters, or using a Sino-Japanese On'yomi reading (音読み) to pronounce the Chinese characters. Local readings are often written in katakana rather than kanji, but not always. For example, 毛泽东 (Mao Zedong) is pronounced Mō Takutō using an On'yomi reading, whereas Beijing (北京) is spelled with kanji but pronounced Pekin (ペキン), with a local reading (which may also be considered a post-Tōsō-on reading), rather than Hokkyō (which would be the Kan-on reading).

== See also ==
- Naming laws in the People's Republic of China
- Onomastics

Kinds of Chinese group-names:

- Chinese clan
- Generation name

Kinds of personal names:

- Art name
- Chinese given name
- Chinese surname
- Courtesy name

Kinds of Chinese monarchical names:

- Chinese era name
- Posthumous name
- Temple name

Other links and influences from Chinese names:

- Indonesian-sounding names adopted by Chinese Indonesians
- List of common Chinese surnames
- Japanese name
- Korean name
- Vietnamese name
