= Impurity of the land of the nations =

Rabbinic decree declaring land outside the Land of Israel to be ritually impure

Impurity of the land of the nations (Tumath eretz Ha'Amim טומאת ארץ העמים) is a rabbinic edict stipulating a specified degree of tumah (impurity) on all lands outside the Land of Israel. The demarcation lines of foreign lands effectually included all those lands not settled by the people of Israel during their return from the Babylonian exile during the Second Temple period, and was meant to dissuade the priests of Aaron's lineage from venturing beyond the Land of Israel where graves were unmarked, and who may inadvertently contract corpse uncleanness and thereby eat their bread-offering (Terumah), unawares, in a state of ritual impurity and becoming liable thereby to kareth. The declaration with respect to foreign lands includes also the "virgin soil" of those lands, and was, therefore, a safeguard meant to prevent the priests from inadvertently transgressing the Law of Moses.

== Decree of tumah ==
The decreed uncleanness in respect of the country of the heathens was first enacted by Jose b. Jo'ezer of Ẓeredah and Jose b. Joḥanan of Jerusalem, during the Hasmonean period. Their decree concerned the earth of such places being capable of rendering a suspected defilement to the Terumah if touched by such earth, which Terumah could neither be eaten by the priests, nor burnt as something unclean. Later, the rabbis who came after them in 12 BCE, some 80 years before the Temple's destruction, added further strictures, empowering the lands of the gentiles and their air-space to render suspected defilement to the bread-offering (Terumah) eaten by the priests, making it unfit for consumption by a priest had it merely passed through foreign lands, but not necessary for him to burn the Terumah. During the beginning of the 2nd-century CE, the rabbis of Usha, under the leadership of Rabban Shimon ben Gamliel, further augmented the earlier rabbinic decrees, making the air-space of foreign lands capable of disqualifying the Terumah insofar that it cannot be eaten, but the earth from the same lands capable rendering a defilement to the Terumah, requiring it to be burnt.

By rabbinic decree, the defilement of foreign lands was made to be tantamount to the defilement of a field where a grave had been ploughed (Beit ha-Peras), meaning, such lands suffer from a severe grade of uncleanness, or what is known as a "Father of uncleanness" (as if the land itself had the same defilement that comes with carrion, or with menstrual blood or with seminal fluid), and, therefore, being capable of rendering defilement at a further remove unto persons who enter therein (i.e. a first-grade level of uncleanness), while the person himself who was defiled by such lands, if he touched Terumah, renders it defiled at a further remove (i.e. a second-grade level of uncleanness), which level is enough to prevent its being eaten by the priests and must be burnt.

Although the priests of Aaron's lineage were discouraged from leaving the land of Israel because of the defilement of foreign lands, they were permitted to leave the land of Israel under certain circumstances, such as when they were needed to render a verdict or give evidence in cases involving monetary lawsuits or in cases involving the death penalty, or to sanctify the New moon, or to intercalate the year, or in cases of ejectment, by showing a deed of title to the land where a gentile had wrongly taken possession of the same field (because of its absent owner), and even if it only entailed presenting the deed of title in a gentile court of law, to show proof of ownership. Likewise, priests were permitted to go abroad to study the Torah or to take a wife in marriage. Since the proscription of leaving the land of Israel is only a rabbinic injunction, the rabbis were lenient in its observance in the above cases.

Rabbi Assi (Yessa), a man of the priestly stock, posed the question of whether or not the honour due to one's father and mother (Exodus 20:11) superseded the prohibition of a Kohen being defiled by the dead (Leviticus 21:1), and if so, was he permitted to leave the land of Israel in order to escort his aged mother from Busra to Israel, even though he ran the risk of contracting corpse uncleanness. Rabbi Yohanan, though uncertain if one commandment took precedence over the other, still permitted him to do so if the journey (embarked on by his mother) was fraught with danger, and she needed protection from bandits along the route. When R. Assi was reluctant to do so, Rabbi Yohanan forthwith gave to him permission to take leave of the country in order to greet his mother. He therefore left the country, only to find out later that it was not his aging mother, but rather her coffin that was en route to Israel. The Talmud concludes there that up to that time, the incident only involved a rabbinic prohibition, such as contracting a defilement declared by the rabbis (as in the impurity conveyed by setting foot in the land of the nations), but did not apply to any biblical prohibition.

Jewish women who were of the priestly stock were not under the general prohibition of leaving the land of Israel, and could venture outside the land of Israel, even if they were to contract corpse uncleanness, since only the male descendants of Aaron the High Priest were commanded to abstain from defilement by the dead (Leviticus 21:1).

The roads taken by Jewish pilgrims to the Land of Israel from places in Babylonia were made exempt from defilement decreed upon the lands of the nations, unless they deviated from those known roads.

== Historical review ==
The edict was enacted, at first in partiality, by Jose ben Joezer and Jose ben Jochanan of Jerusalem in either the 2nd century BCE or early 1st-century BCE. The edict enacted at the time was limited to a clump of soil originating outside the land of Israel that made its way into Israel and effectively branded that clump a safek tumah (perhaps impure but not impure for certain). The edict at the time did not include an edict on the airspace outside Israel.

Eighty years prior to the destruction of the Second Temple, the Sanhedrin, while still stationed in Jerusalem, added an edict deeming the airspace outside Israel to be tamei (impure).

The Sanhedrin, after its move to Usha, further added the restriction of a clump of earth originating from outside Israel be labeled tamei for certain.

== Reasoning and logic ==
From the specifics recorded in Mishnaic and Talmudic text, the reasoning and logic behind the apparently strict enactments seems to stem from concern of the burial practices of the non-Jews during the Second Temple era. The concern was that non-Jews did not always bury their dead in established cemeteries, but instead sometimes opted for burial at any opportune site - and without erecting a fixed and element-proof tombstone to mark the burial site. Jewish priests of Aaron's lineage who are required to eat their Terumah bread in a state of ritual cleanness were suspected of inadvertently making contact with such graves, and becoming defiled thereby unawares.

The Tosafists point out that another concern of the Sages was to discourage Israelites from leaving the Holy Land by pointing out its tahor ("pure") qualities and the merit of performing mitzvoth therein, as opposed to the lands outside Israel where not all the biblical commands (mitzvot) are mandatory or even applicable. By making the prohibition a "general prohibition" effecting all Israelites, the priests would also abstain from leaving the country.

== Application ==
The edict effectively limited the international travel of a Kohen (due to the Torah-law restriction of Kohen defiling himself to tumah of a corpse and paraphernalia). The rabbinic authorities of the era were somewhat lax on the edict if the purpose of the Kohen's trip was of notable purpose; such as marriage, Torah study (under tutelage of a renowned rabbi) or for certain mitzvah purposes.

=== Helena of Adiabene ===
A notable occurrence of strict application of the edict is quoted in the Mishnah;

(There happened) a story with Hilni the Queen that her son went to war. She said "if he will return from war in peace I will become a Nazirite for seven years", her son subsequently came from the war and she became a Nazirite for seven years. and at the end (of her seven-year period), she went up to the land (Judea). And Beit Hillel instructed her that she must observe her vow for seven more years (due to the edict of tumah placed on lands outside Israel)

— Mishna, Nazir 3:6

== Tumath Ohel ==
There is a Tannaic debate as to whether entry to lands outside Israel in a tent ("Ohel") - meaning the person exiting Israel would not physically touch the ground outside Israel - would render the person tamei (impure) or not.

== See also ==
- Mosaic of Rehov
- Laws and customs of the Land of Israel in Judaism
- Yom tov sheni shel galuyot
- From Dan to Beersheba
