= Taboo =

Societal or cultural prohibition

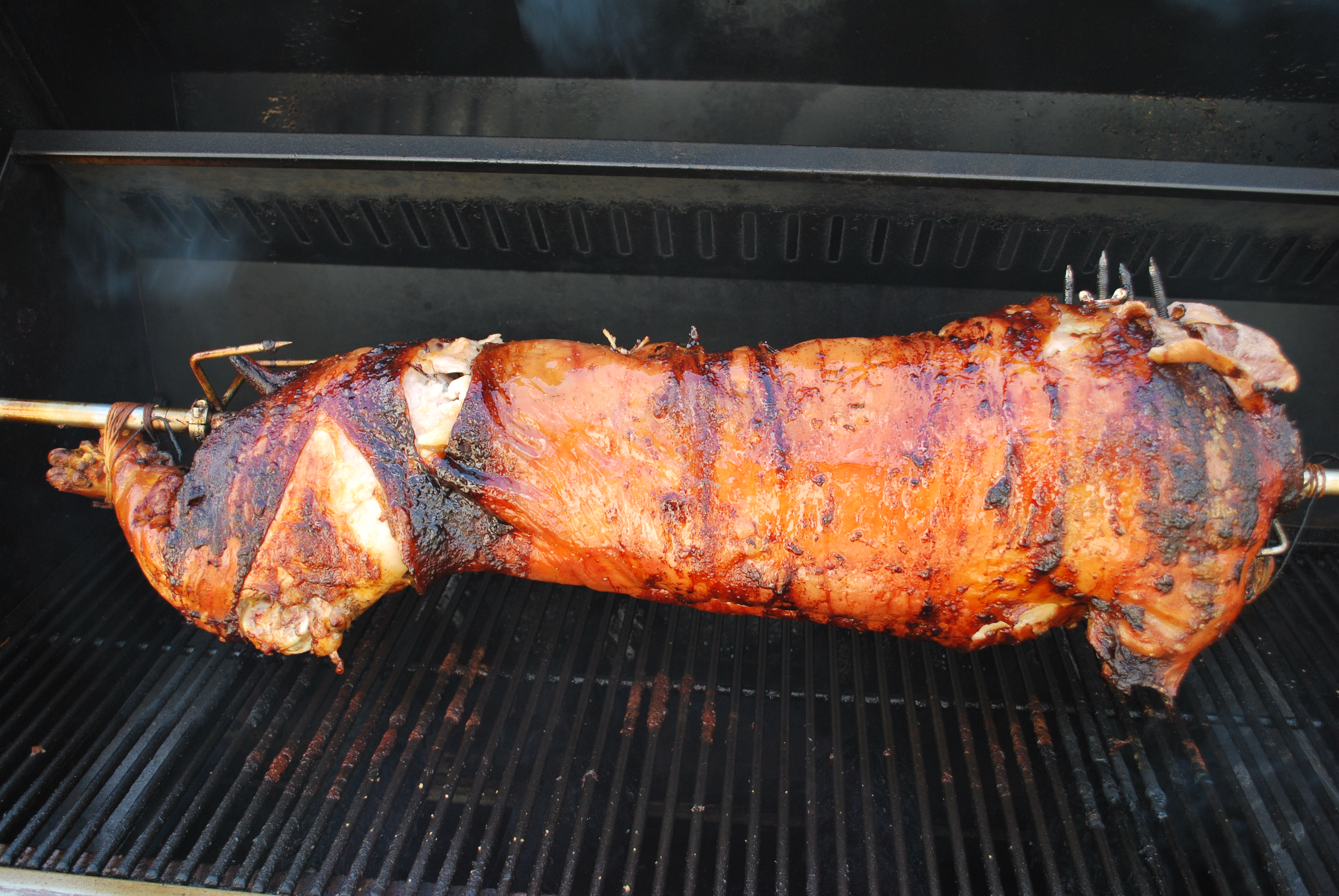
The consumption of pork is considered taboo in some cultures.

A taboo is a social group's ban, prohibition or avoidance of something (usually an utterance or behavior) based on the group's sense that it is excessively repulsive, offensive, sacred or allowed only for certain people. Such prohibitions are present in virtually all societies. Taboos may be prohibited explicitly, for example within a legal system or religion, or implicitly, for example by social norms or conventions followed by a particular culture or organization.

Taboos are often meant to protect the individual, but there are other reasons for their development. An ecological or medical background is apparent in many, including some that are seen as religious or spiritual in origin. Taboos can help use a resource more efficiently, but when applied to only a subsection of the community they can also serve to suppress said subsection of the community. A taboo acknowledged by a particular group or tribe as part of their ways aids in the cohesion of the group, helps that particular group to stand out and maintain its identity in the face of others and therefore creates a feeling of "belonging".

The meaning of the word taboo has been somewhat expanded in the social sciences to strong prohibitions relating to any area of human activity or custom that is sacred or forbidden based on moral judgment, religious beliefs, or cultural norms.

== Etymology ==
The English term taboo comes from tapu in Oceanic languages, particularly Polynesian languages, with such meanings as "prohibited" or "forbidden". That root tapu is reflected, among others, by Tongan or Māori tapu, and by Hawaiian kapu. Its English use dates to 1777 when the British explorer James Cook visited Tonga, and referred to the Tongans' use of the term taboo for "any thing that is forbidden to be eaten, or made use of". Having invited some of the Tongan aristocracy to dinner aboard his ship, Cook wrote:

Not one of them would sit down, or eat a bit of any thing. . . . On expressing my surprise at this, they were all taboo, as they said; which word has a very comprehensive meaning; but, in general, signifies that a thing is forbidden.

The term was translated to him as "consecrated, inviolable, forbidden, unclean or cursed". Tapu is usually treated as a unitary, non-compound word inherited from Proto-Polynesian *tapu. It also exists in other Oceanic languages outside Polynesian, such as Fijian tabu, or Hiw (Vanuatu) toq.

Those words descend from an etymon *tabu in the ancestral Proto-Oceanic language, whose meaning was reconstructed as "forbidden, off limits; sacred, due to a sentiment of awe before spiritual forces".

In its current use in Tongan, the word tapu means "sacred" or "holy", often in the sense of being restricted or protected by custom or law. On the main island, the word is often appended to the end of "Tonga" as Tongatapu, here meaning "Sacred South" rather than "Forbidden South".

== Examples ==
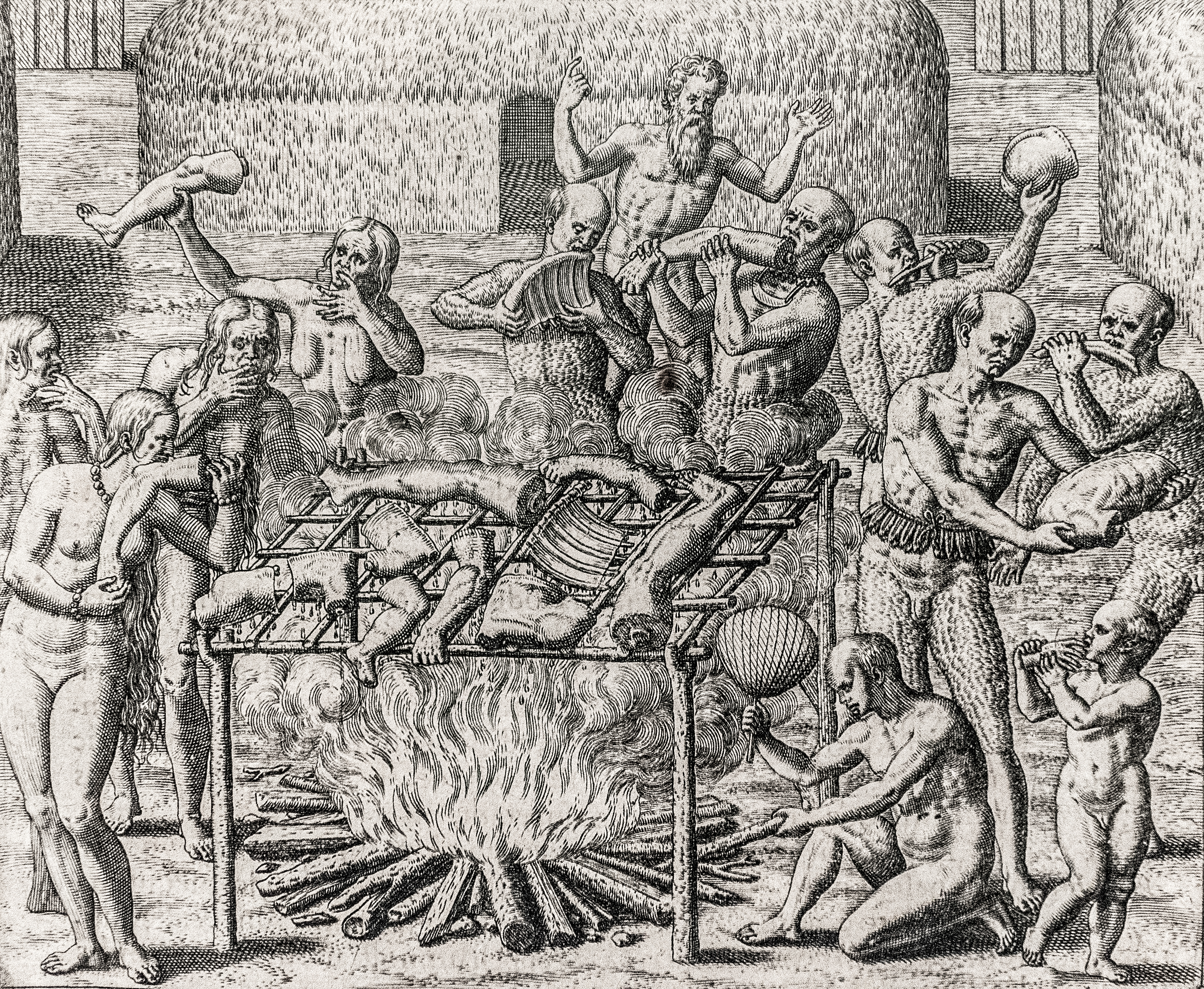
Cannibalism, Brazil. Engraving by Theodor de Bry for Hans Staden's account of his 1557 captivity.

Sigmund Freud speculated that incest and patricide were the only two universal taboos that formed the basis of civilization. Through an analysis of the language surrounding these laws, it can be seen how the policy makers, and society as a whole, find these acts to be immoral.

Common taboos involve restrictions or ritual regulation of killing and hunting; sex and sexual relationships; reproduction; the dead and their graves; as well as food and dining (primarily cannibalism and dietary laws such as vegetarianism, kashrut, and halal) or religious (treif and haram). In Madagascar, a strong code of taboos, known as fady, constantly change and are formed from new experiences. Each region, village or tribe may have its own fady.

The word taboo gained popularity at times, with some scholars looking for ways to apply it where other English words had previously been applied. For example, J. M. Powis Smith, in his book The American Bible (editor's preface 1927), used taboo occasionally in relation to Israel's Tabernacle and ceremonial laws, including Exodus 30:36, Exodus 29:37; Numbers 16:37–38; Deuteronomy 22:9, Isaiah 65:5, Ezekiel 44:19 and Ezekiel 46:20.

Albert Schweitzer wrote a chapter about taboos of the people of Gabon. As an example, it was considered a misfortune for twins to be born, and they would be subject to many rules not incumbent on other people.

== In religion and mythology ==
According to Joseph Campbell, taboos are used in religion and mythology to test a person's ability to withhold from violating a prohibition given to them. Should one fail the test and violate a taboo, they will be subsequently punished or face the consequences of their actions. Taboos are not societal prohibitions (such as incest); rather, the use of taboo in these stories relates to its original meaning of "prohibition": for example, a character could be prohibited from looking, eating, and speaking or uttering a certain word.

=== Greek ===
An example of an eating taboo in Greek mythology could be found in the tale of the abduction of Persephone. Hades, who had fallen in love with Persephone and wished to make her his queen, burst through a cleft in the earth and abducted Persephone as she was gathering flowers in a field. When Demeter, Persephone's mother, finds out of her daughter's abduction, she forbids the earth to produce (or she neglects the earth) and, in the depth of her despair, causes nothing to grow. Zeus, pressed by the cries of the hungry people and by the other deities who also heard their anguish, forced Hades to return Persephone. It was explained to Demeter that Persephone would be released, so long as she did not taste the food of the dead. Hades complies with the request to return Persephone to Demeter, but first, he tricks Persephone, forcing her to break the eating taboo by giving her some pomegranate seeds to eat. In other interpretations, Persephone is seen eating the pomegranate seeds as a result of temptation or hunger. In the end, Hermes is sent to retrieve her but, because she had tasted the food of the underworld, she was obliged to spend a third of each year (the winter months) there, and the remaining part of the year with the gods above. With the later writers Ovid and Hyginus, Persephone's time in the underworld becomes half the year.

The most notable looking taboo in Greek myth can be found in the story of Orpheus and Eurydice. Orpheus, the son of Apollo, was well-renowned as a legendary musician whose music could move anything and everything, living or not, in the world. While walking among her people in tall grass at her wedding, Eurydice was set upon by a satyr. In her efforts to escape the satyr, Eurydice fell into a nest of vipers and suffered a fatal bite on her heel. Her body was discovered by Orpheus who, overcome with grief, played such sad and mournful songs that all the humans, nymphs, and gods learnt about his sorrow and grief and wept with him. On the gods' advice, Orpheus traveled to the Underworld wherein his music softened the hearts of Hades and Persephone, who agreed to allow Eurydice to return with him to earth on one condition: he should guide her out and not look back until they both had reached the upper world. As he reached the upper world, Orpheus looked back toward Eurydice in his eagerness to reunite with her, tragically forgetting about the looking taboo given to him by Hades, and since Eurydice had not crossed into the upper world, she vanishes back into the Underworld, this time forever.

A speaking taboo in Greek myth can be found in the story of Anchises, the father of the Trojan warrior Aeneas. Aphrodite had fallen in love with the mortal Anchises after Zeus persuaded Eros to shoot her with an arrow to cause these emergent feelings. One interpretation recounts that Aphrodite pretended to be a Phrygian princess and seduced him, only to later reveal herself as a goddess and inform Anchises that she will bear him a son named Aeneas and warns him not to tell anyone that he lay with a goddess. Anchises does not heed this speaking taboo and later brags about his encounter with Aphrodite, and as a result, he is struck in the foot with a thunderbolt by Zeus. Thereafter, he is lame in that foot so that Aeneas has to carry him from the flames of Troy.

Another, albeit lesser-known, speaking taboo in Greek myth can be found in the story of Actaeon. Actaeon, whilst on a hunting trip in the woods, mistakenly and haplessly happened upon the bathing Artemis. When Artemis realized that Actaeon had seen her undressed, thus desecrating her chastity, she punished him for his luckless profanation of her virginity's mystery by forbidding him from speech. Whether it be due to forgetfulness or outright resistance, Actaeon defied his speaking taboo and called for his hunting dogs. Due to his failure in abiding by his speaking taboo, Artemis turned Actaeon into a stag and turned his dogs upon him. Actaeon was torn apart and ravaged by his loyal dogs who did not recognize their former master.

=== Abrahamic ===
Possibly the most famous eating taboo (if not taboo, in general) is in the story of Adam and Eve in the Abrahamic religions. In the Judeo-Christian telling, found in Genesis 3, Adam and Eve are placed in the Garden of Eden by God and are told not to eat from a tree lest they die, but Eve is promptly tempted by a serpent (often identified as Satan in disguise) to eat from the Tree of the knowledge of good and evil because they will surely not die, rather, they might become "like God". Eve violates the eating taboo and eats from the forbidden fruit of the tree, shortly giving some fruit to her companion, Adam. After eating the forbidden fruit, Adam and Eve are aware of their nakedness and cover themselves with fig leaves and hide from God. God realizes that they are hiding and interrogates them about having eaten from the tree whereupon Adam assigns the blame to Eve and Eve assigns it to the serpent. As a result, God condemns Eve with pain in childbirth and subordination to her husband, he condemns Adam to have to labor on the earth for his food and be reduced into the earth at death, and in the Christian tradition, he condemns all of humanity for this original sin. God then expels Adam and Eve from the Garden of Eden lest they eat from the Tree of Life and become immortal "like Him".

In Islam, the story of Adam and Eve is quite different, though it contains an eating taboo: the Quran mentions that Adam (Arabic: آدم), as the successive authority of earth by decree of Allah, is placed in a paradisal garden (not Jannah nor the Garden of Eden) therein along with his wife (unnamed in the Quran, though the Hadith gives her the name Ḥawwā’, Arabic: حواء); such a paradise this garden was, that they would never go hungry nor unclothed, nor would they ever thirst or be exposed to the sun's heat. Allah took a promise from Adam:

˹Allah said,˺ “O Adam! Live with your wife in Paradise and eat from wherever you please, but do not approach this tree, or else you will be wrongdoers.”

— Surah Al-A'raf 7:19

Iblis, angered at his expulsion from Jannah for refusing to bow to Adam at his inception, decided to trick Adam and his wife into being shunned by Allah, just as he was. Allah had warned Adam and his wife about Iblis, telling them that he was a "clear enemy". Iblis swore in the name of Allah that he was their sincere advisor, revealed unto Adam and his wife each other's nakedness, and convinced them to eat from the forbidden tree so that they may never taste death. After eating from the tree (thus breaking the eating taboo), Allah removes Adam and his wife from their paradisal garden, telling them that mankind will be condemned with some being enemies with others on the earth wherein they will be provided habitation and provision, for a while, and “There you will live, there you will die, and from there you will be resurrected.”^{[Quran 7:25]}

In the Gnostic telling of this story, the taboo is a plot by the archons to keep Adam in a state of ignorance by preventing him from eating the fruit, which allows him to attain gnosis after the serpent, who is viewed as representative of the divine world, convinces him and Eve to eat it.

A looking taboo can be found in the Judeo-Christian telling of the story of Lot found within the Book of Genesis. In Genesis 19, two angels in the form of men arrived in Sodom at eventide and were invited by Lot to spend the night at his home. The men of Sodom were exceedingly wicked and demanded Lot that he bring his two guests out so that they might "know" them; instead, Lot offered up his two daughters, who had not "known" man, but they refused. As dawn was breaking, Lot's visiting angels urged him to get his family and flee, so as to avoid being caught in the impending disaster for the iniquity of the city. The command was given, "Flee for your life! Do not look behind you, nor stop anywhere in the Plain; flee to the hills, lest you be swept away." Whilst fleeing, Lot's wife broke the looking taboo by turning to look back at the destruction of Sodom and Gomorrah and was turned into a pillar of salt as punishment for disobeying the angels' warning.

== Function ==
Communist and materialist theorists have argued that taboos can be used to reveal the histories of societies when other records are lacking. Marvin Harris explains taboos as a consequence of ecologic and economic conditions.

== Modernity ==
Some argue that contemporary Western multicultural societies have taboos against tribalisms (for example, ethnocentrism and nationalism) and prejudices (racism, sexism, homophobia, extremism and religious fanaticism).

Changing social customs and standards also create new taboos, such as bans on slavery; extension of the pedophilia taboo to ephebophilia; prohibitions on alcohol, tobacco, or psychopharmaceutical consumption (particularly among pregnant women), unmoderated discussions of politics and religion, sexual harassment and sexual objectification are increasingly becoming taboo in recent decades.

Incest itself has been pulled both ways, with some seeking to normalize consensual adult relationships regardless of the degree of kinship (notably in Europe) and others expanding the degrees of prohibited contact (notably in the United States). Although the term taboo usually implies negative connotations, it is sometimes associated with enticing propositions in proverbs such as forbidden fruit is the sweetest.

In medicine, professionals who practice in ethical and moral grey areas, or fields subject to social stigma such as late termination of pregnancy, may refrain from public discussion of their practice. Among other reasons, this taboo may come from concern that comments may be taken out of the appropriate context and used to make ill-informed policy decisions that would lead to (otherwise preventable) maternal death.

== See also ==
- Anathema
- Blasphemy
- Bullying
- Conspiracy of silence
- Deformity
- Desecration
- Desecration of graves
- Deviance
- Domestic violence
- Etiquette
- Food and drink prohibitions
- Gambling
- Geas
- Human cannibalism
- Humiliation
- Identity performance
- Incest
- Infidelity
- Kapu (Hawaiian culture)
- Mental disorders
- Morality
- Naming taboo
- Obscenity
- Pedophilia
- Profanity
- Prostitution
- Public morality
- Sexual ethics
- Sexual fetishes
- Social norms
- Social stigma
- Stalking
- Structural violence
- Suicide
- Taboo on rulers
- Taboo on the dead
- Treason
- Vulgarity
- Word taboo
- Zoophilia
