= Conservation and restoration of Judaica =

Preservation of Jewish heritage collections

Objects used in Jewish rituals are known collectively as Judaica. The conservation and restoration of Judaica takes into account the collective body of Jewish religious laws derived from the written and oral Torah known as halacha in order to properly care for these materials. This work involves identifying these objects and therefore knowing how any of these objects are traditionally handled, stored, exhibited, and generally cared for based on their use and significance.

== Definition of culturally sensitive objects ==
Traditional Judaism divides ritual objects into two main categories, those that carry holiness; and those that are essential to the performance of a particular ritual or commandment but that have no intrinsic quality that is defined as sacred or holy. Once they are no longer in ritual use and are in the possession of a museum, only some of the objects in the first category are traditionally treated differently from the way other collections are treated. For these pieces, repair or restoration done by a conservator is not common. It is common for almost all other objects, conservation, repair, or restoration to be carried out without restriction.

The way the culturally sensitive objects below are handled and preventively conserved is all based on the laws and thoughts of the most strict sect of Judaism as is recommended.

Below is a list of both types of objects with definitions and descriptions to aid in identifying and therefore knowing how any of these objects might be handled and cared for due to their uses and significance. Additionally, these descriptions will aid in understanding the care and handling methods listed below them.

References are made to Ashkenazi, Sephardi, and Mizrachi Jews in this article. Ashkenazi Jews trace their ancestry to communities in central and eastern Europe while Sephardi Jews are those who came originally from the Iberian Peninsula. These Jews were expelled in 1492 during the Spanish Inquisition and settled in places like Greece, Turkey, the Netherlands, and what is known as Israel today. Mizrachi Jews are those who trace their ancestry to the Arab world and Iran, as well as those whose families never left Palestine.

=== Types of sacred and non-sacred objects ===
Tashmishey Kedushah is the first category of ritual objects and is defined as "objects which carry holiness" or "accessories of holiness". The most common example of this is the Torah which is the Five Books of Moses.

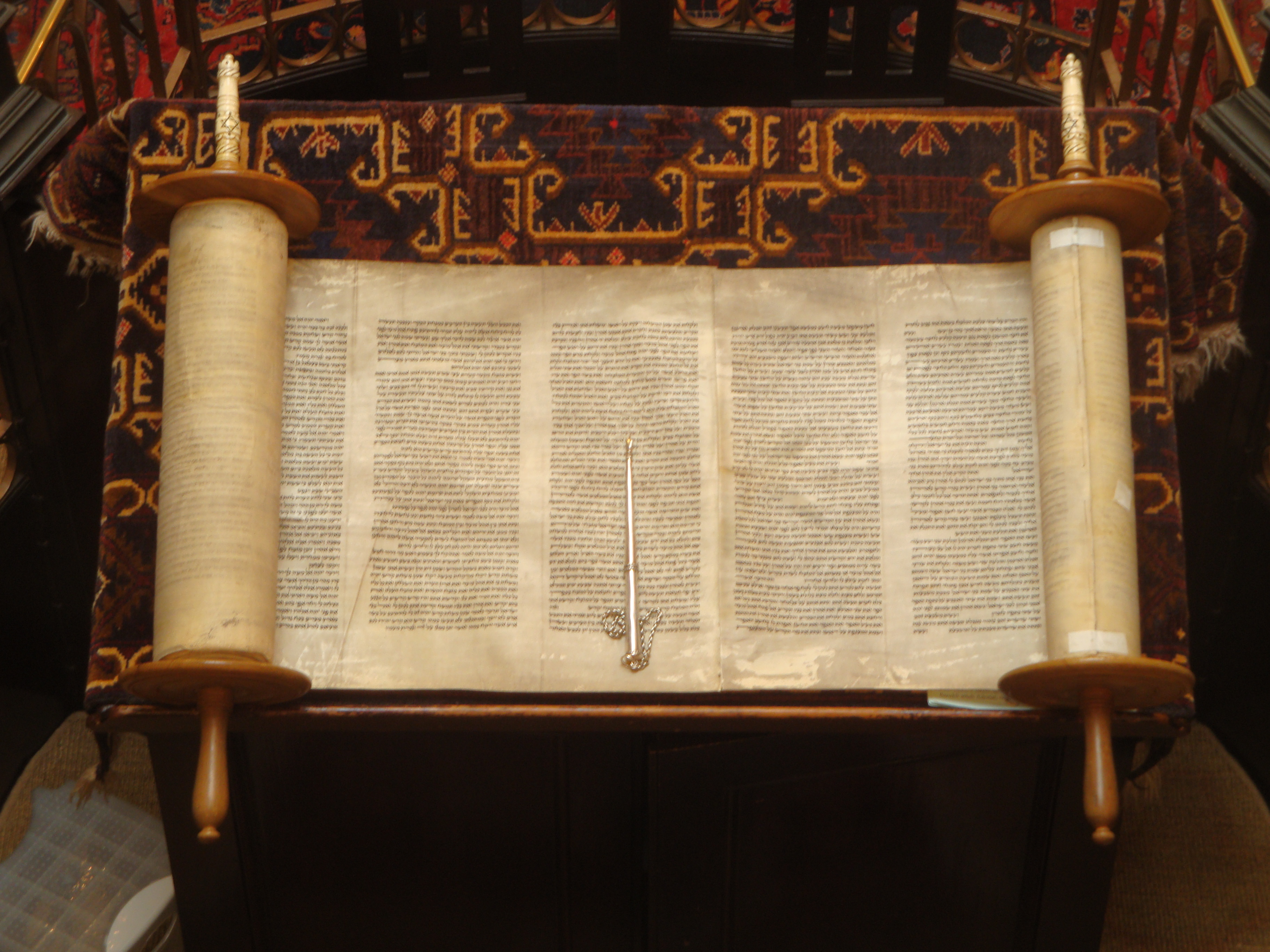
Open Torah scroll

The common feature of the objects in this group is that they contain words, specifically the name of God, but by extension, any words "divinely written" or inspired, from which the quality of holiness is derived. Because the nontextual objects surrounding these scrolls all come into contact with them, they also acquire some of the same quality of holiness. The transmission is not indefinite. It extends a maximum of two layers from the text.

Other objects in this category include:

- Torah curtains – Curtains that are in front of the Torah ark and are often decorative in nature but can also be plain.
- Mantle – A piece of fabric often used to cover a Torah scroll and often made of velvet or another soft material with some type of embroidery. This is used most often by Ashkenazi communities.
- Torah binder – A strip of soft fabric, similar to the mantle, that keeps the Torah scroll closed. In Italy and in the Sephardi communities, the binder is known as a "fascia"; it is made of a costly material or of linen embroidered in silk thread.
- Rimonim – Silver and gold ornaments that are placed on the wooden rollers or in Hebrew, "atzei chaim" (trees of life). Many times these are adorned with little bells and are very intricate.
- Breastplate – A metal shield placed in front of the mantle of the Torah scroll in Ashkenazi communities. This custom did not develop in Sephardi communities because their Torah scrolls were kept in a case (tik) which did not lend itself to such additional decoration. Symbolic of, and sometimes similar to, the breastplate prescribed for the high priest, the object is often called "ḥoshen mishpat", the Hebrew word for breastplate.
- Yad – The pointer used by the Torah reader to keep one's place is known as a "yad", in Hebrew, or "hand" in English, in Ashkenazi communities and as the "moreh" or "pointer/teacher" or "Kulmus" or "quill" in Sephardi and Eastern communities. The pointer was originally a narrow rod, tapered at the pointing end, usually with a hole at the other end through which a ring or chain could be passed to hang the pointer on the Torah scroll. Now it looks like a hand with one finger pointing out. This is used so that no hands touch the actual scroll and transfer oils or dirt. Pointers are made for the most part of silver or silver-plated brass, but in a few European communities, they used to be made of wood. In such cases, the pointers were carved in the local folk-art style.
- Wood Torah case – Used by Sephardic Jews instead of a fabric mantle allowing the Torah to sit upright when not in use and without the use of a chair or holder as mentioned above.
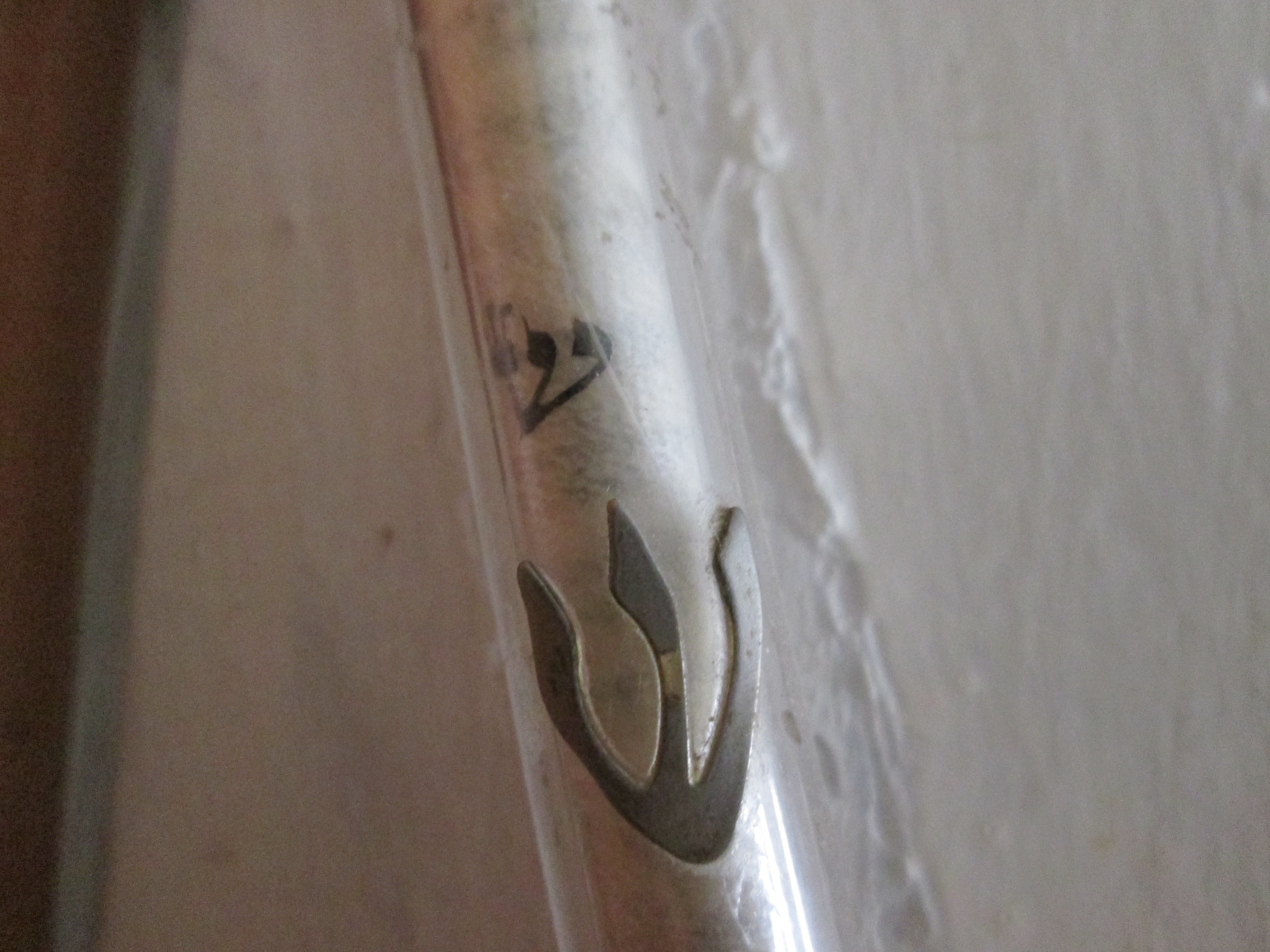
  ShinMezuzahJosephSherman
- Chair or holder on which the Torah is placed when it is removed from the ark and not being read.
- Tefillin – Known in English as "phylacteries", are worn by men in the Orthodox and Conservative movement during morning prayer and on weekdays. This includes a leather case, the biblical texts written on parchment that is inside, the leather straps used to fasten them to the head and arm during prayer (see image of soldier below), and any bag specifically made to hold them and used for that purpose on a regular basis.
- Mezuzah – A metal, ceramic, or glass casing in which the handwritten text on parchment or "klaf" in Hebrew, is held. This object is fastened to the doorpost of a house and, traditionally, to interior doorways as well and marks the home of a Jewish family.

Bibles, prayer books, volumes of the Talmud, law codes, and commentaries, in a variety of languages, are now also included in this list. In some communities, any document of any kind written in Hebrew letters is also included. This can sometimes also include anything written in Yiddish which uses the same alphabet.

==== Tashmishey Mitzvah ====
Tashminey Mitzvah is a category that includes most other ritual objects essential to Jewish life. Objects include:

- Wine or kiddush cups used on Sabbath and holidays
- Hanukkah menorah
- Seder plate
- Shofar
- Tallit with knotted fringes, called tzitzit.
- Lulav or a palm branch in English, tied together with willow and myrtle and etrog (citron) to be used on the Jewish harvest holiday of Sukkot,
- Etrog containers – That keep the etrog safe from the "pitam" or "pitom" breaking off making the fruit less valuable and possibly not kosher.
- Sabbath candlesticks – Used weekly during Shabbat
- Spice box and candle holder used for the Havdalah service that marks the end of the Jewish Sabbath, called Shabbat.
- Challah and matzah covers – Used to cover bread for Shabbat and the holiday of Passover which tells the story of the exodus from Egypt.
- Chuppah – or wedding canopy in English

== Preventive conservation ==
Once holy/sacred objects (tashmishey kedusha) leave the Jewish community and enter the care of a museum, it is common practice that this group of objects is divided into two sections. The first section contains the three written texts including the Torah scroll, tefillin, and klaf for the mezuza. (These all are, or contain, biblical texts that were handwritten on parchment, in a particular script, according to rigid rules, by men who are specially trained as scribes (sofrim)). The second section includes all other material, including printed or handwritten documents, Torah mantles, ark curtains, tefillin bags, Torah ornaments, and mezuza cases (see other section below).

In terms of preventive conservation and conservation itself, Torah scrolls, tefillin, and mezuza scrolls traditionally are left as they are. According to halacha, once they are no longer in use, there is no reason for them to be kosher—in proper condition to be used—and therefore no reason why missing or abraded letters are restored or minor repairs made to the parchment unless the museum wishes to do as they see it necessary for the safety of the object.

The repair of other books and documents has often been done with the respect that would characterize any professional conservation treatment. In Judaism, the study of traditional texts is considered to be the equivalent of prayer. To restore any text, whether of aesthetic or historical value or not, to a state in which it can be studied is considered an act of merit whatever the religious or cultural affiliation of the person doing the work. This includes when it will just be on view in an exhibition.

=== Torah, Klaf ===
If, for the safety of a Torah scroll, it is determined that repairs must be done to the rollers on which the scroll is mounted, traditionally, these repairs are done by a scribe, who will then remounts the parchment onto the roller in the traditional manner. It has been proven that a Torah scroll that has a tear in the parchment does best when it is kept rolled to another part of the scroll. According to tradition, if two pages are separated the two parts of the scroll are most often wrapped and stored separately. If it is considered both possible (considering the condition of the parchment) and essential to rejoin the separated leaves.

When Torah scrolls, prayer books, or volumes of the Talmud are in the possession of a Jewish institution, it is a common practice to only photograph (or making photocopies) of open scrolls or pages only for serious study or publication. Once the books and other documents are in an archive, or museum, the rules of the institution apply. These rules are usually based on condition and value, but restrictions on casual copying do exist in all cases.

=== Tefillin – phylacteries ===
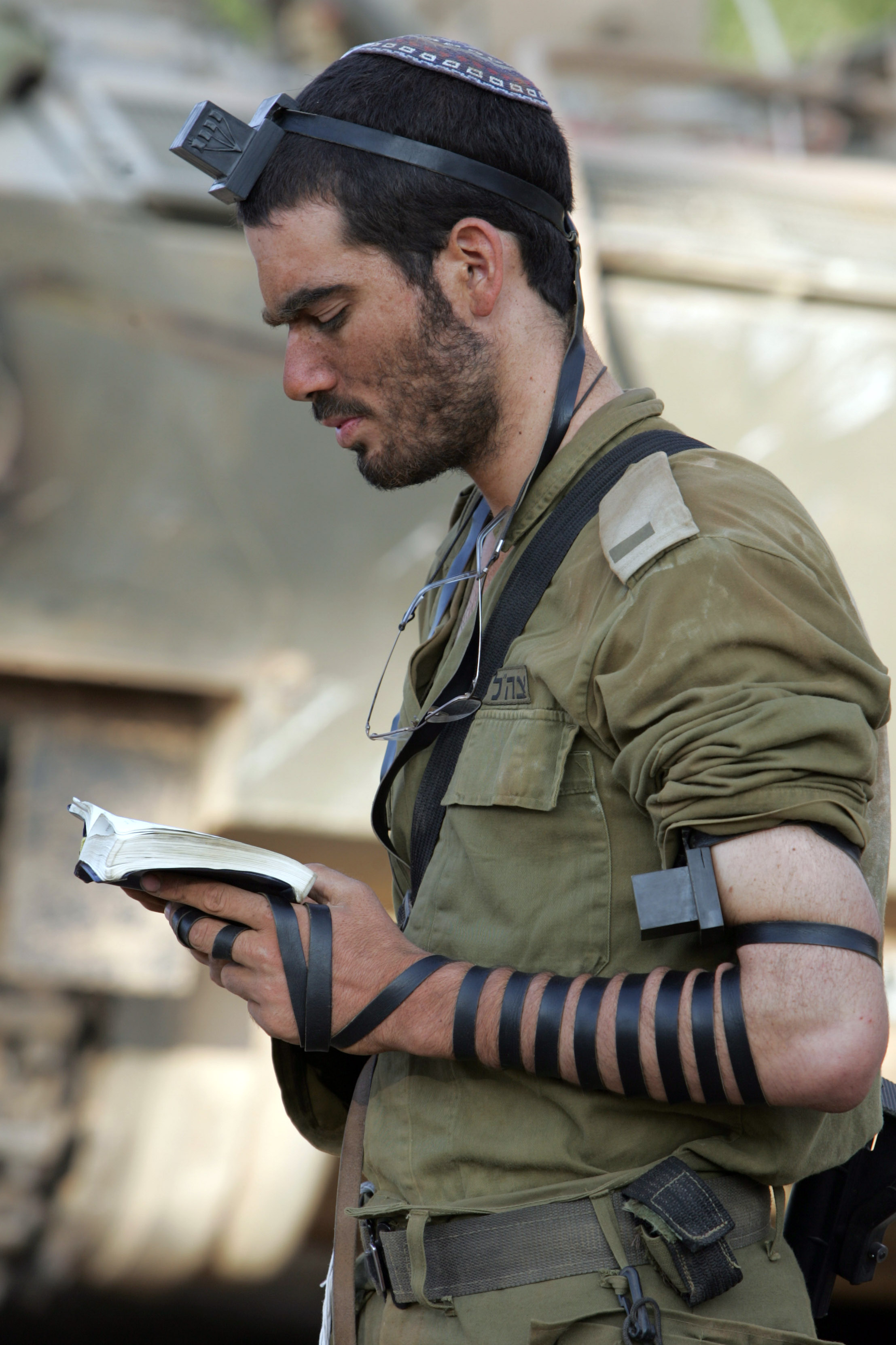
IDF field commander, Asael Lubotzky, during Second Lebanon War, prays with tefillin.

It is against halacha to open tefillin unless it is necessary. According to Jewish tradition, the removal and examination of the klaf within the tefillin only occurs when the tefillin are being repaired. The style of the writing can give clues to the registrar or conservator to the time and place in which they were written. Many institutions exhibit tefillin in damaged condition if there is a special reason such as its association with a famous person, or in an exhibit of Holocaust-related material.

=== Other materials ===
Objects in this group are commonly treated by any qualified conservator who will treat Jewish ritual material as anthropological material rather than as art, keeping conservation treatment to a minimum, and avoiding extensive restoration. Any ethical treatment is seen as permitted. It is noted that Conservators in private practice, who may not have the option of minimal treatment, may take on greater responsibility as a result of the above. Original fabric or trimming removed from an ark curtain have traditionally given to the owner for proper disposal. If the owner is unwilling to do this is it common for the responsibility to fall on the conservator to make other arrangements.

=== Holocaust related objects ===
Alterations of any kind to an object that survived the Holocaust, unless absolutely necessary to ensure its physical survival, are not made out of respect for the victims. Conservators and collections staff traditionally attempt to do the least amount of conservation on an object from the Holocaust as the damaged state is part of what is seen as telling of the history of the object. Any intervention can be seen as causing a loss of historic and perhaps even esthetic information, and the greater the intervention the greater the damage.

At Holocaust museums and other museums carrying objects from concentration camps including fragile items like prisoners' artwork and thousands of documents, shoes, and suitcases, teeth, hair, glasses, luggage, and more, preservation is viewed as an ethical and practical issue. Conservators and registrars alike wrestle with questions about the proper role of restoration. It has been noted that people coming to see these objects don't want to see a replica of how something might have once looked, but they are looking for what it looks like because of what it, and what its owner, went through.

The concentration camps themselves are also considered artifacts to be to preserved as close to how they originally looked while still conserving them. This includes the barracks and other buildings that are exposed to natural conditions like atmosphere, rain, cold, etc. When Auschwitz was liberated by the Soviet army in January 1945, it covered 40 square kilometers, with three camps, sub camps, and an additional area that was supervised by SS administration. While some were hesitant to leave the camp as it was because of difficult memories, it was upon the request of former prisoners that the local government keep the former concentration camp intact as a memorial and the Polish government began initiatives to preserve the site, giving the Ministry of Culture and Art the authority to preserve parts of it.

Alternatively, the conservation of audio or visual records (photographs, films, voice records) is different. The audio or visual recordings of past historical events that are caught as images or sound are not the original as there is no physical original. Because they are the only remaining representation of the events of the Holocaust, such as the Nazi book burnings in the Opernplatz in Berlin, this media is commonly conserved as much as possible.

== Overarching ethical concerns ==
Because of certain rules, restrictions, and traditions within the Jewish religion, certain ethical concerns are commonly top-of-mind when caring for sacred Judaica.

=== Kohen restriction ===
Many restrictions were designed to maintain what is referred to as ritual purity for Jews who are of the "Priest" holy order in the Temple of Jerusalem. Today, most Jews will know if they come from that Kohen line, and one might be able to tell from the last name of Cohen, Kohn, Kahn, etc. Many of the laws and practices are still maintained in traditional Judaism. One law that might affect the conservation of objects is that Kohanim are forbidden to be in contact with dead bodies, or be under the same roof as a corpse or any part of one, except in the case of the death of a close relative. This could prevent a conservator or registrar (doing preventive conservation) from caring for objects that are of the human remains nature, but only if it bothers the professional because of his or her background.

=== Menstruation and women touching objects ===
It is the practice in some ultra-orthodox sects of Judaism that women who are menstruating do not touch any sacred texts for purity reasons. This is only a custom and is not written into Jewish law. Because of this, female conservators are able to work with the texts but remain cognizant of this custom.

=== Placement of sacred texts and objects on the floor ===
Materials containing: (a) God's name, (b) Three consecutive words of a biblical verse, when written on one line with the intent to quote the verse, or (c) Other written or printed Torah ideas or laws are considered to be holy and, according to Jewish law, are not placed on the floor for any reason. Schoolwork, homework and test papers may be included in this category if they contain any of the above. All these materials are considered holy objects whether they are in Hebrew or another language, in braille, or on microfilm.

=== Stacking of sacred texts ===
Additionally, any materials with God's name are not, according to halacha, stacked one on top of the other in any type of museum storage. Many consider this to be disrespectful to the holy objects.

== Exhibition and storage ==
While there are few restrictions on the exhibition of Jewish ritual objects and generally none on the examination of this material for purposes of study by anyone of any religion or culture, it is important to mention the exceptions below.

It has been proven that Torah scrolls, tefillin, and mezuza scrolls do best if exhibited in an unrolled fashion unless they are deemed no longer fit for ritual use. These objects are generally stored covered with plain cloth or tissue paper in a dark drawer or cabinet and are separated from their holders if a conservator or registrar feels it is unwise to leave them in the same place. A reason for this is if the mantle is deemed unfit to stay on the Torah scroll. It is common practice for a Tefillin that needs to be separated from its bag to be kept in a plain cloth bag for storage. Small Torah scrolls are commonly stored lying down while large ones are kept upright on a rack specifically made to hold their weight.

Mezuzah scrolls are traditionally kept in their cases or wrapped in tissue.

=== Handling and long-term care ===
Generally, when taken out for any reason, such as to be examined by a researcher, tashmishey kedusha is treated with respect as any object that is still being used in rituals. The surface on which the objects are placed is covered with a clean cloth or appropriate non-acidic paper, and the objects are covered when not being examined. Any scrolls being examined are re-rolled up when not in use.

It has been proven that if the parchment is in good enough condition, it's best for the preservation of Torah scrolls and other rolled documents to be completely rolled front to back (or vice versa) and back to the center, once every year or two. This is most commonly done by two people who are experienced in this procedure and under the supervision of a conservator.

== Conservation and restoration ==
In many Jewish institutions, if it is decided that an object has reached the point of needing conservation, a museum registrar will connect a conservator with an expert in the type of object or in the Judaica field. This pairing of Rabbi with a conservator, a religious expert with conservator, or a professor with conservator, is known to creates a more trustworthy situation where the Museum does not have to worry that all Jewish rules are followed. If the conservator has any questions on process, or on what to do and not do, he or she can refer to the assigned expert.

Instead of contacting a conservator if there are issues with a Torah, specifically involving the writing on the parchment, a registrar or curator will traditionally connect with a Sofer Stam, or a scribe in English. This expert is trained in transcribing the Torah, tefillin, and mezuzahs, and other religious writings. According to Jewish law, or halacha, they are the only people allowed to touch these texts. Scribes also assemble the Torah scrolls, sewing the sheets of parchment together and mounting them on the rollers, and make the cases for tefillin.

== De-accessioning ==
When it comes to the deaccessioning process of museum objects that a conservator or other museum professional deems beyond repair, these said objects can be disposed of through destruction. They will be destroyed by the curator or his/her designee. When it comes to disposal of Judaica, there are different rules depending on whether the object is deemed still holy or longer holy and whether they are fit for ritual use, or not fit for ritual use.

=== Holy/sacred objects (Tashmishey Kedushah) ===
If collections professionals have artifacts that are holy Jewish objects containing the name of God (tashmishey kedusha) that have been determined to be beyond conservation and the museum no longer wants them in the collection and would otherwise dispose of them, this is, according to halacha, not allowed. Jewish law instructs how these types of objects are to be "put away" (O.H. 154.3; Mishneh Torah, II 10.3).

Traditionally, Ashkenazi Jews fulfill this requirement of "putting away" a holy object through burial, either in a specific part of a Jewish cemetery or, in some places, next to or along with a man of exceptional piety and learning.

Many Sephardic/Mizrachi Jewish communities put these objects instead into a special room in the synagogue, called a geniza (from the root meaning "conceal", "hide", or "preserve"). Because this group of objects includes books that are both handwritten and printed, documents, and traditional items, the storage rooms can get quite full. The most famous geniza is in the Ezra Synagogue in Cairo. It held more than 200,000 pages, some dating to the founding of the synagogue in 882.

=== Non Holy/sacred objects (Tashmishey Mitzvah) ===
For the most part, objects that fall under tashmishey mitzvah are discarded when they are no longer fit for ritual use. This is because they have no intrinsic quality of holiness. even though they have value when it comes to Western aesthetics of beauty. One exception to this law is the tallit. The Shulchan Arukh, a medieval law code (first published 1565) and still considered authoritative by traditional Jews, states that tzitzit, the strings that hang from a tallit, are just as holy as the tallit itself and is treated as such.
