= Word taboo =

Taboo involving restrictions on language

Word taboo, also called taboo language, offensive word, language taboo or linguistic taboo is a kind of taboo that involves restricting the use of words or other parts of language due to social constraints. This may be due to a taboo on specific parts of the language itself (such as certain words, or sounds), or due to the need to avoid a taboo topic. The taboo against naming the dead in parts of the world is an example. Taboo words are commonly avoided with euphemisms, such as the English understatement pass away, meaning "die" and the English minced-oath for goodness' sake, meaning "for God's sake". It is a common source of neologisms and lexical replacement.

== Causes and motivation ==
Restrictions on language typically originate from the need to avoid referencing taboo topics. One interpretation of the notion of taboo regards it as a prohibition on forbidden behaviour or objects, due to their perceived dangerous or sacred nature. Any members of the community who come into contact with artifacts associated with the central subject of the taboo would be subject to some penalty, unless they atoned for the mistake.

Taboo language can be regarded as a means to censor, or at least avoid the mention of taboo topics, for fear of incurring the cost of violating the taboo itself. By extension, elements of language such as words, names or phonemes can become taboo themselves, as they can be seen as an inalienable part of the tabooed entity.

== Linguistic taboos ==
A linguistic taboo is any element of a language bearing a quality that renders it intrinsically impolite or forbidden.

=== Profanity ===
Profanity refers to language that is generally considered to be strongly impolite, rude, or offensive. Profanity may often serve an exclamation function, although typically it is used to insult another person. Thus, as a form of verbal violence, it is often considered taboo in polite company and subject to censoring (either by speakers themselves, or by some authority).

While profane terms and insults tend to be derived from tabooed objects, such as bodily organs and excrement, not all references to tabooed objects are necessarily considered to be profanity. For example, in English, erudite terms for bodily functions do not tend to function well as insulting epithets, although this constraint may not apply to other categories of taboos, such as sexual practices. It has been suggested that whether a term can be considered an expletive may depend on whether it is intended to be applied figuratively or literally.

=== Naming taboo ===
In certain cultures, speaking a tabooed name is akin to assaulting the owner of that name, and sanctions will be levied onto the offender. Punishments for violations of the taboo can be dealt in the form of payment of goods to an offended party, or appeasement of an offended spirit. In some cases, deliberate violations of naming taboo have led to death by murder or suicide due to shame. In one example, a man from an Adzera-speaking village in Papua New Guinea had broken a very strong name taboo in front of his father-in-law. In shame, he fled into the mountains occupied by a rival tribe, deliberately allowing himself to be killed by the enemy.

== Non-linguistic taboos ==
Non-linguistic taboos are terms or topics that are believed to be impolite or unacceptable for use due to social context. In contrast to profanity, they are not intrinsically impolite. Rather, they are perceived to be so in specific circumstances, as determined by the culturally-contingent beliefs or concepts of politeness held by a speaker or their listener(s). Coincidentally, this sometimes results in the acceptability of their use varying relative to the register that a culture considers appropriate when conversing within a given implicit stratum of social interaction.

=== Euphemism ===
Euphemisms are typically used to avoid the explicit mention of forbidden subjects, as opposed to avoiding the use of forbidden elements of the language. In social interactions, euphemisms are used to avoid directly addressing subjects that might be deemed negative, embarrassing, or otherwise discomforting to the speaker or their listeners.

An example of a taboo topic among many cultures that is commonly avoided in language is disease. While many diseases have been studied and understood over decades, the taboo against diseases such as syphilis still runs deep. In modern times, doctors tend to continue avoiding the term syphilis with their patients, preferring to use alternative labels like treponemal disease, luetic disease (from Latin lues 'contagion, plague'), and so forth. In a similar vein, topics such as menstruation have also historically been considered taboo, thereby garnering euphemisms such as have an issue and flowers (Leviticus 15:1, 19–24). In either case, both "afflictions" were taboo as they were considered dangerous; menstrual blood was thought to carry contagious diseases such as syphilis.

Euphemisms can also be used to downplay the gravity of large-scale injustices, war crimes, or other events that warrant a pattern of avoidance in official statements or documents. For instance, one reason for the comparative scarcity of written evidence documenting the exterminations at Auschwitz, relative to their sheer number, involves "directives for the extermination process obscured in bureaucratic euphemisms".

=== Religion ===
Religion plays a significant role in the concept of taboo, as demonstrated by the etymology of the word taboo, which is borrowed from Tongan tapu ("prohibited, sacred"). The religious perspective tends to consider language as vested with supernatural powers. Consequently, religion tends to be a source of language taboo.

Across ancient, medieval, and modern religious discourse, direct mention of the name of the "evil spirit" Satan reflects the taboo on the devil, born from out of the belief that doing so will incite misfortune on the speaker and interlocutor. Instead, this antagonist is euphemistically identified by the characteristic of being harmful or betraying towards the religion. This is seen from alternative labels such as feond (fiend) dating to Old English, enemī (enemy) dating to Middle English in 1382, and arch-traitor dating to Modern English in 1751, among countless others.

== Effect on language change ==
=== Taboo-motivated lexical replacement ===
Taboo-motivated lexical replacement is a cross-linguistic phenomenon where the avoidance of taboos lexical items by speakers can motivate the creative use of language. The tabooed terms are eventually replaced, causing language change. This taboo-driven change can lead to the remodeling of language, or create semantic shift due to the use of figurative language in euphemisms. For example, the term stark naked derives from the expression start naked, dating back to Old English in the 13th century, where start originally was steort meaning 'tail, rump' in Old English. The change in the final /t/ consonant to /k/ could be due to attempts to obfuscate the reference to the body part, or due to the influence of the phonetically similar term stark.

The following languages exhibit examples of taboo-motivated lexical replacement:

- Coast Salish languages
- Southern Bantu languages
- Tiwi language
- Haruai language

=== General linguistic changes ===
Another example demonstrating how linguistic taboos can drive language change is the case of iSi-Hlonipha, which is the practice among Nguni-speaking communities where married women were forbidden from uttering sound sequences in their father-in-law's name. This fueled a need for replacement phonemes, which led to the import of phonemes from neighbouring languages. Thus, click consonants were imported from the nearby Zulu and Xhosa languages into Nguni, which did not originally feature clicks.

== See also ==
- Name taboo
- Avoidance speech
- Expurgation
- Racial slurs
- Un-word of the year
- Noa-name – Word used instead of a taboo or dangerous word
