= Taboo on the dead =

Cultural practice regarding the dead

The taboo on the dead includes the taboo against touching of the dead, those surrounding them and anything associated with the dead.

== Taboo against naming the dead ==
A taboo against naming the dead is a kind of word taboo whereby the name of a recently deceased person, and any other words similar to it in sound, may not be uttered. It is observed by peoples in many parts of the world, including the indigenous peoples of northern Australia, Siberia, Southern India, the Sahara, Subsaharan Africa, and the Americas.

=== First Nations of Australia ===
As part of funerary ritual, certain Aboriginal cultures in Central Australia, Arnhem Land and Cape York Peninsula prohibit anyone from speaking a person's name during the mourning period after their death. The mourning period varies according to the age and status of the deceased, from a couple of months in the case of a baby up to four years in the case of a prominent leader or lawman. During the mourning period the person can be referred to in a roundabout way (e.g., "that old lady"), by a generic kinship name, by a substitute name such as Kuminjay, or by their family name only.

In some cultures, the taboo extends to the use of the deceased's given name in any context, even when referring to other people, places, objects and concepts with a similar name. This can have a long-term impact on the language, as words similar to those of the deceased are progressively replaced with synonyms or loanwords. Linguist Bob Dixon considered that this would have resulted in such significant vocabulary replacement over time as to hinder application of the comparative method in linguistics – though this is disputed.

Ethnologist Philip Jones says that adherents to this taboo believe that the spirit of the deceased is "potentially dangerous, toxic, wicked and mischievous" and must be encouraged to return to its source in the spirit-land. To speak the deceased's name is to risk calling the spirit back to the real world, where it may cause destruction. Over the past century, these beliefs have – for some communities at least – changed to include text, photographs and film as well as speech.

==== In media ====
While many government agencies and other organisations try to respect these traditions, it can be complicated in cases where the person's death is newsworthy. It can also be difficult to determine whether the name of a given Aboriginal person is subject to the taboo. For example, when Yolŋu teacher and musician Mandawuy Yunupingu died in June 2013, initial news reports used his first name before being changed to refer to him simply as "Yunupingu".

Some Australian television stations and websites use a blanket disclaimer warning Aboriginals and Torres Strait Islanders about material that may contain images and voices of such people who have died, although this ignores the limited application of the taboo among Aboriginal communities and time limits on the mourning period.

==== In clinical practice ====
McGrath and Phillips argue that "cultural sensitivity and respect, coupled with knowledge of the traditions and practices in respect of the death and dying, are of utmost importance in communicating with Aboriginal peoples" in a clinical context. While they reported that naming taboos were widespread among Northern Territory Aboriginal people, there was considerable variation in how they were applied by families.

== Taboo on contact with the dead ==
In Judaism, contact with a corpse causes a person to become ritually impure, and thus unable to enter the Temple until purified using the ashes of the red heifer. This defilement can be caused not only by physical contact with the dead, but also by indirect contact (e.g. contact with one who touched a body) or by entering a building or room containing a corpse. As the red heifer does not currently exist, all Jews are considered by Halakha to be ritually impure regarding the Temple Mount. Kohanim (Jewish priests) are further restricted, being forbidden from intentionally coming into contact with the dead or from walking too closely to a grave. Exceptions are made for a Kohen's seven closest relatives that have died (father, mother, brother, unmarried sister, son, daughter, or wife).

== Origins and causes ==
Wilhelm Wundt associated the taboo with a fear that the dead man's soul has become a demon. Moreover, many cases show a hostility toward the dead and their representation as malevolent figures. Edward Westermarck noted that "Death is commonly regarded as the gravest of all misfortunes; hence the dead are believed to be exceedingly dissatisfied with their fate [...] such a death naturally tends to make the soul revengeful and ill-tempered. It is envious of the living and is longing for the company of its old friend."

Sigmund Freud's explanation for taboos regarding the dead, expanding Wundt's and Westermarck's observations, was that the fear of the presence of the dead person's ghost is a symbolization of unresolved tensions experienced during life, and the guilt pervading a living person's perception of a dead person. This fear, to Freud, is the explanation for ceremonies aimed at keeping the ghost at a distance or driving it off, with the taboo remaining intact until the body of the dead person has completely decayed.

== See also ==
- Avoidance speech
- De mortuis nil nisi bonum – taboo on speaking ill of the dead
- Naming taboo
- Necronym
- Posthumous name
- Thanatology
- Vengeful ghost
- Voldemort effect
