= Hanbo =

Hanbo may refer to:

- Hanbo Steel, a South Korean company most prominent for the 1997 Hanbo scandal (Hanbogate)
- Hanbo Securities, original name of South Korean company NH Investment & Securities
- Hanbō (半棒), a staff used in martial arts
- Hanbō (半頬), a kind of men-yoroi (Japanese facial armour)

People with the name Hanbo include:

- Wang Xihou (1713–1777), courtesy name Hanbo, Chinese scholar executed by the Qing Dynasty
- Li Hanbo (born 1991), Chinese football midfielder

== See also ==
- Hambo, a Swedish dance
