= Gate of Divine Prowess =

Northern gate of the Forbidden City

- 神武门
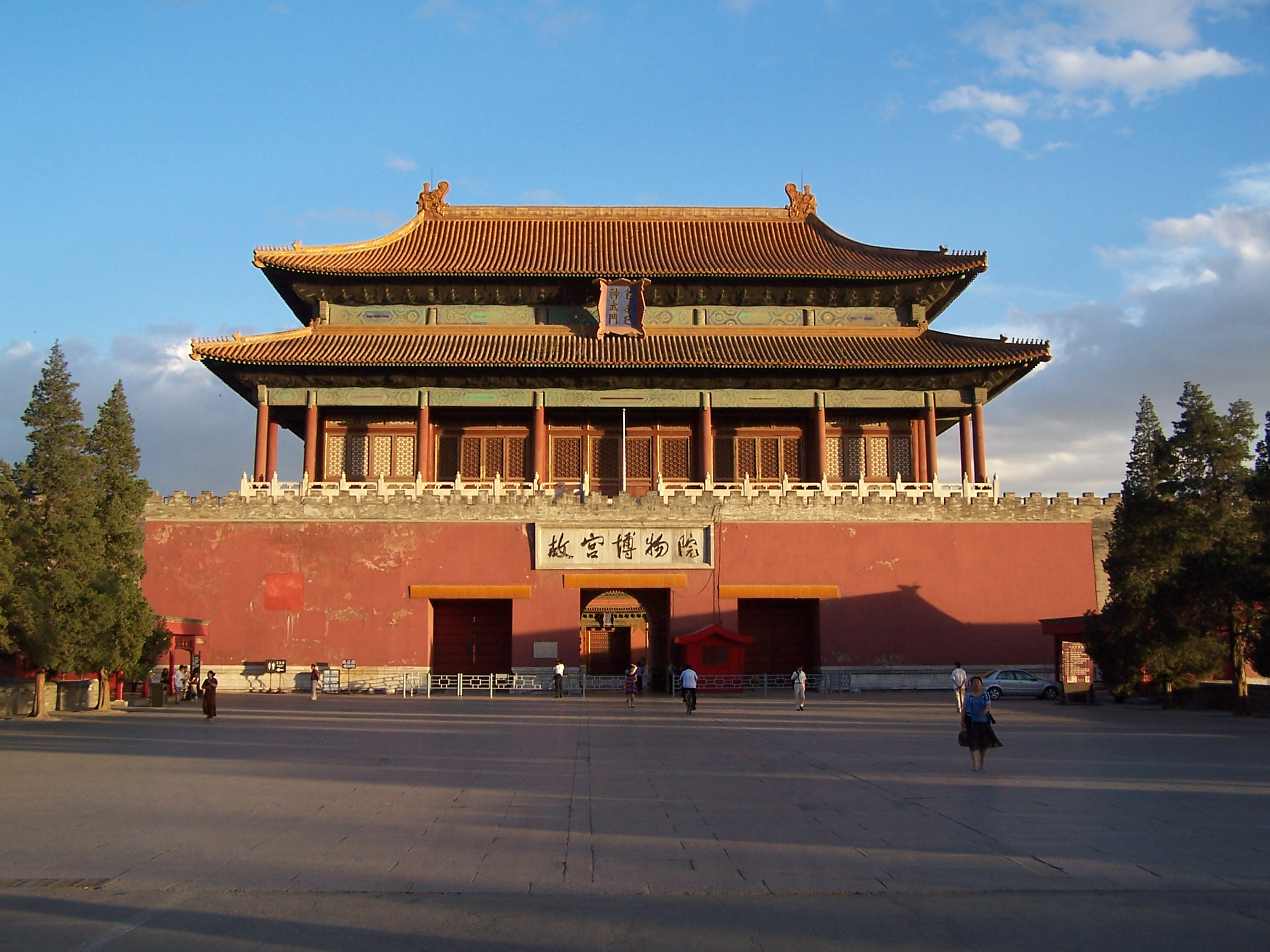
- The Gate of Divine Might, the northern gate. The lower tablet reads "The Palace Museum" (故宮博物院)
- Interactive map of the Gate of Divine Prowess area
- Former names: Black Tortoise Gate
- Alternative names: Gate of Divine Might

General information
- Type: Gate
- Location: Forbidden City, Beijing, China
- Coordinates: 39°55′15.4″N 116°23′25.5″E
- Opened: 1420

The Gate of Divine Might or Gate of Divine Prowess (simplified Chinese: 神武门; traditional Chinese: 神武門; pinyin: Shénwǔmén, Manchu: ᡧᡝᠨ
ᡠ
ᠮᡝᠨ šen u men) is the northern gate of the Forbidden City in Beijing, China.

== History ==
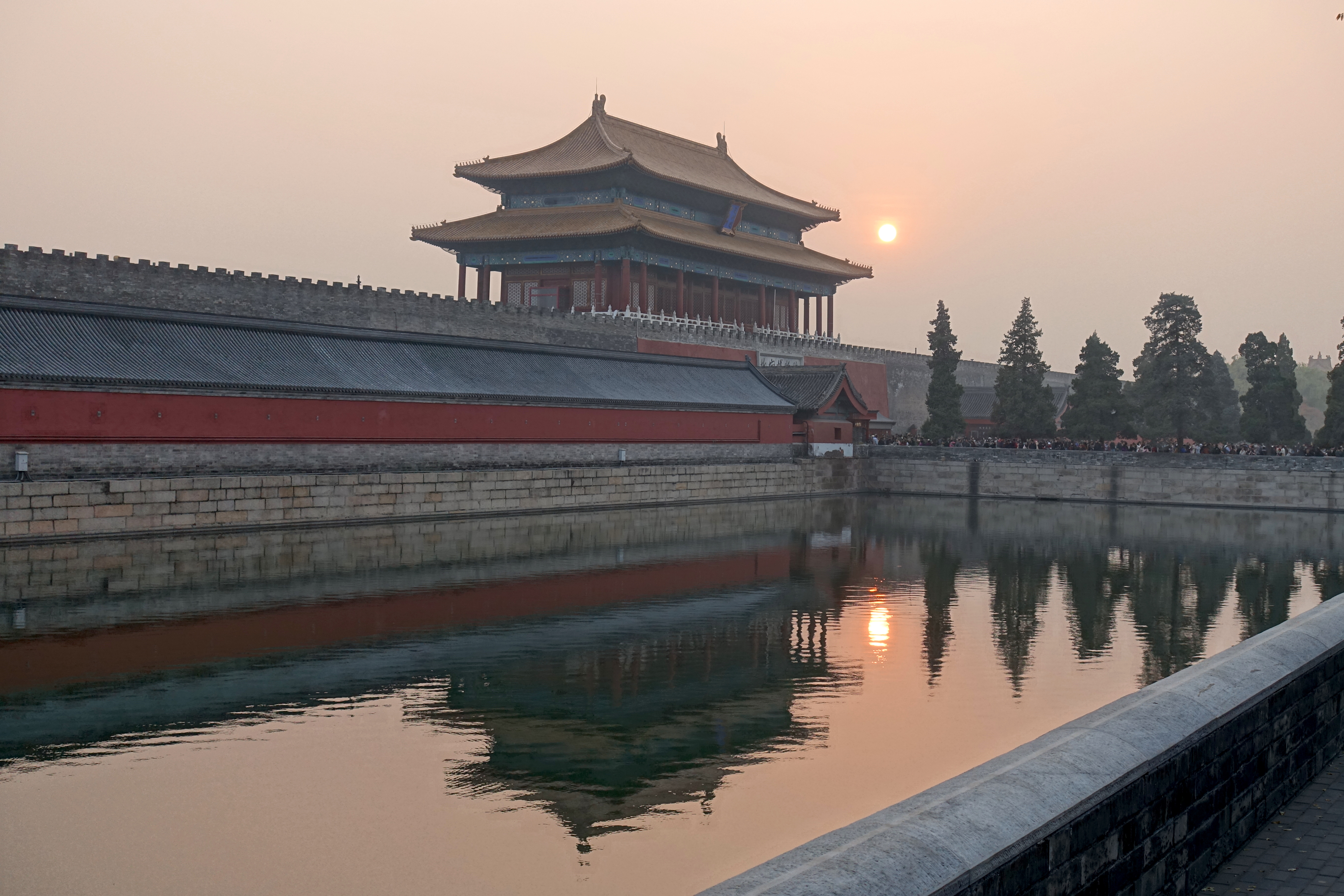
Gate of Divine Might and moat

The gate was built in 1420, during the 18th year of Yongle Emperor's reign. The Gate was originally named "Black Tortoise Gate" (玄武門; Xuánwǔmén), but when Qing dynasty's Kangxi Emperor, whose birth name was Xuanye (玄燁), ascended to the throne, the use of the Chinese character Xuan (玄) became a form of naming taboo.

The gate is the back gate of the palace, and was used by palace workers. Women being sent into the palace for selection as concubines also entered the palace through this gate.

The Xuanwu Gate Incident, while sharing a similar name with this gate's original name, did not take place at this gate. The palace coup happened during the Tang dynasty, when the capital was in Chang'an.
