= Hongkonger name =

Personal names in Hong Kong reflect the co-official status of Cantonese and English in Hong Kong. According to a 2015 survey, 25.8% of Hongkongers have English given names as part of their legal names; a further 38.3% of Hongkongers go by English given names even though those are not part of their legal names. The two figures add up to a total of 64.1% of Hongkongers having English names.

For example, a person who has Kuo as his surname, Chi Yung as his Cantonese given name and Peter as his legal English given name, would have his name rendered as either "KUO Chi Yung Peter" or "KUO Chi Yung, Peter" (with comma) on court papers, in the format of "Surname + Cantonese given name + optional comma + English given name", though non-court commentaries might render his name as Peter Kuo Chi-yung (with hyphen) or Peter Kuo.

== Surname ==
Generally, the Cantonese majority employ one or another romanization of Cantonese. However, non-Cantonese immigrants may retain their hometown spelling in English. For example, use of Shanghainese romanization in names (e.g. Joseph Zen Ze-kiun) is more common in Hong Kong English than in official use in Shanghai where Mandarin-based pinyin has been in official use since the 1950s.

== Given name ==
Chinese names and sometimes Chinese surnames in Hong Kong may be supplemented by or replaced by an English name when using English. The use of English names in Hong Kong is not well researched or documented. English names in Hong Kong can use various proper names and nouns that are not often found in the Western world, with some examples being Rimsky Yuen, York Chow, and Moses Chan. Inspiration for English names in Hong Kong can come from the names of months, sports brands, and luxury labels. More conventional English names can undergo distortion by the addition, substitution, or deletion of letters (e.g. Sonija, Garbie, Kith), as well using suffixes like -son (e.g. Rayson). Others adopt a Western name that sounds similar phonetically to their Chinese name, such as Hacken Lee from Lee Hak-kan (李克勤). These categories (addition, substitution, phonetic-based, etc.) are the fundamental ways of generating creative Hong Kong names.

== Maiden name ==
In case a married person uses the spouse's surname, the maiden name is usually placed after that surname. For instance, the 4th Chief Executive of Hong Kong Carrie Lam Cheng Yuet-ngor has Carrie and Yuet-ngor as the English and Cantonese personal names respectively, Cheng as the maiden name, and Lam from the surname of her husband Lam Siu-por. In the English-speaking world, married women are sometimes referred by "first name + married name" style, which is Carrie Lam in the example above, while locally as "married name + maiden name + personal name" style.

== See also ==
- List of Hong Kong placename etymologies
- Hongkongers
- Culture of Hong Kong
- Official Cantonese translations of English names for British officials
