= Wang Xihou =

Qing Dynasty writer (1713–1777)

- Born: 1713; Xinchang County (modern-day Yifeng County), Jiangxi
- Died: 1777 (aged 63–64)
- Occupation: Scholar
- Conviction: Guilty
- Criminal charges: Violating the naming taboo regarding the Kangxi Emperor

Chinese name
- Traditional Chinese: 王錫侯
- Simplified Chinese: 王锡侯
- Hanyu Pinyin: Wáng Xīhóu

Courtesy name
- Traditional Chinese: 韓伯
- Simplified Chinese: 韩伯
- Hanyu Pinyin: Hánbó

Wang Xihou (Chinese: 王錫侯; 1713–1777), courtesy name Hanbo (韓伯), was a Chinese scholar from Xinchang County (modern-day Yifeng County, Jiangxi) who lived during the Qing dynasty. He was executed under the Qing government's literary inquisition policies during the reign of the Qianlong Emperor.

Wang was born in 1713. At the age of five, he began his studies with his brother Wang Jingyun (王景雲), and became proficient at the exegesis of ancient Chinese texts by age eight. He locked himself in a room, studying day and night, and was sent home-cooked meals through a small crevice.

Wang became a scholar-bureaucrat at age 38. He wrote a book called Zi Guan (字貫), which criticized the Kangxi Dictionary and printed the Kangxi Emperor's name without leaving out a stroke as required by Chinese naming taboo. When the Qianlong Emperor found out about this in 1777, Wang was imprisoned in Beijing and sentenced to nine familial exterminations, the most serious form of capital punishment in imperial China. However, as was usual in such cases with literary inquisition, the Emperor commuted the sentence by pardoning all Wang Xihou's relatives and his grandsons given only a procedural sentence of execution at the autumn assizes (秋審; qiushen) during which the case would be reviewed and usually spared the death penalty. Wang Xihou's sentence was commuted from death by 1000 cuts to only death by beheading.

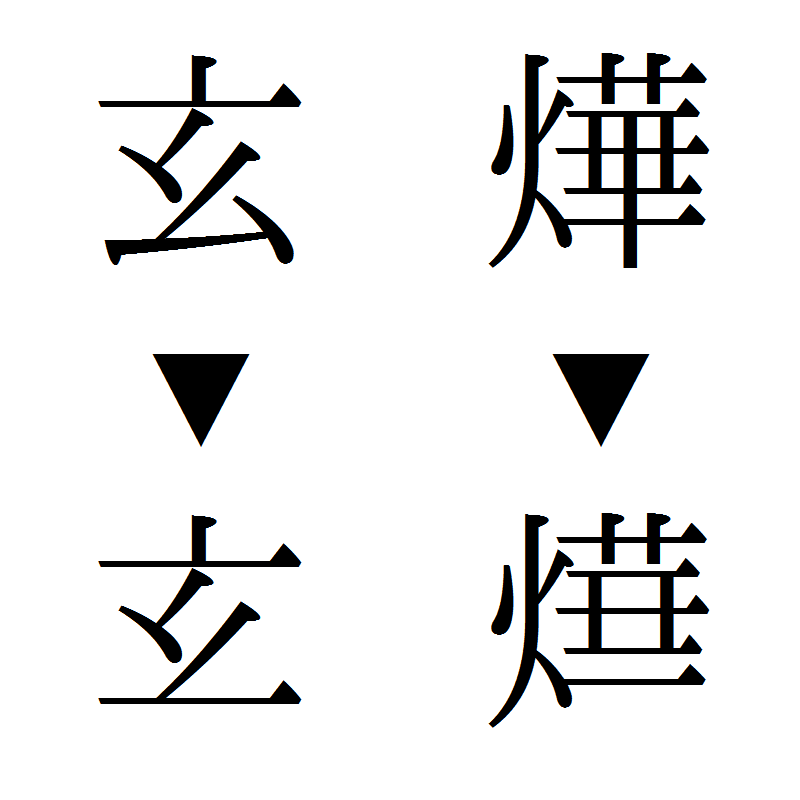
Avoidance of naming taboo: Example of omitting a stroke. The last stroke of each character of Kangxi Emperor's given name "玄" (xuán) and "燁" (yè) is omitted.
