= Looking taboo =

Motif in mythology and folklore

Looking taboo is a motif (a recurring element) in mythology, folklore and works of fiction. A person is prohibited to look at something or somewhere for fear of dire consequences.

== Notable examples ==
A notable looking taboo is in the story of Orpheus and Eurydice in Greek mythology. Orpheus fell in love with Eurydice, who was bitten by a snake and died. On the gods' advice, Orpheus traveled to the Underworld wherein his music softened the hearts of Hades and Persephone, who agreed to allow Eurydice to return with him to the living world on one condition: he should guide her out and not look back until they both had reached the upper world. As he was about to reach the living world, Orpheus looked back toward Eurydice in excitement to see his beloved, and Eurydice was trapped in the Underworld forever.

Another looking taboo is in the story of Lot in the Book of Genesis. In Genesis 19, two angels in the form of men arrived in Sodom and were invited by Lot to spend the night at his home. The wicked men of Sodom demanded that Lot should bring his guests out so that they might "know" them carnally; instead, Lot offered his two daughters, who had not "known" man, but the men of Sodom refused. In the morning, the angels advised Lot to flee with his family to avoid the destruction of the city: "Flee for your life! Do not look behind you, nor stop anywhere in the Plain; flee to the hills, lest you be swept away." While fleeing, Lot's wife broke the looking taboo, looked back at the destruction of Sodom and Gomorrah, and was turned into a pillar of salt as punishment.

In Greek mythology Medusa had a hideous appearance so that anyone who looked upon her was turned to stone. Athena loaned Perseus her polished shield for him to view Medusa's reflection without becoming petrified, so he circumvented the looking taboo and successfully beheaded Medusa.

In Japanese mythology, two stories involve a prohibition from looking at a female at certain moments: those of Toyotama-hime and of Izanami-no-Mikoto. In these stories the female deity is banished from "this world" because a male deity looked at her at an improper moment despite the prohibition to do so: Izanami was going to rejuvenate, and Toyoutame-hime was going to give birth.

In European bestiaries and legends, a basilisk is a legendary reptile reputed to be a serpent king, who causes death to those who look into its eyes.

== Classification ==
In Motif-Index of Folk-Literature this motif is classified under C300-C399 "Looking taboo":

- C310: looking at certain person or thing.
  - C311: seeing the supernatural.
  - C312: man looking at woman.
    - C312.1: man looking at nude woman. (Lady Godiva, Actaeon)
  - C313: woman looking at man.
  - C315: looking at certain object.
  - C316: looking at certain animal.
- C320: looking into certain receptacle.
  - C321: looking into box (Pandora's box)
- C330: looking in certain direction.
  - C331: looking back. (Lot's wife, Orpheus and Eurydice)
