= Taboo on rulers =

Rules about monarchs causing bad luck

Taboos regarding rulers includes both taboos on people coming into contact with a ruler and the taboos regarding the ruler themselves.

== Examples ==
- The Nubas of East Africa believe that they would die if they entered the house of their priestly king; however, they can evade the penalty of their intrusion by baring the left shoulder and getting the king to lay his hands on it.
- In West Africa, at Shark Point near Cape Padron, in Lower Guinea, lives the priestly king Kukulu, alone in a wood. He may not touch a woman or leave his house; indeed he may not even quit his chair, which he is obliged to sleep sitting, for if he lay down no wind would rise and navigation would be stopped.
- The ancient kings of Ireland were subject to a number of restrictions as listed in The Book of Rights. The king, for instance, may not stay in a certain town on a particular day of the week; he may not cross a river on a particular hour of the day; he may not encamp for nine days on a certain plain, and so on.

== Analysis ==
Freud attributes the existence of such taboos to an unconscious current of hostility toward the king/ruler. In the following example the hostility toward the ruler is more obviously shown:

The savage Timmes of Sierra Leone, who elect their king, reserve to themselves the right of beating him on the eve of his coronation; and they avail themselves of this constitutional privilege with such hearty goodwill that sometimes the unhappy monarch does not long survive his elevation to the throne. Hence when the leading chiefs have a spite at a man and wish to rid themselves of him, they elect him king.

But even in such glaring instances, however, the hostility is not admitted as such, but masquerades as a ceremonial.

== See also ==
- Naming taboo
