= Corpse uncleanness =

State of ritual uncleanness due to contact with a corpse

Corpse uncleanness (Hebrew: tum'at met) is a state of ritual uncleanness described in Jewish halachic law. It is the highest grade of uncleanness, or defilement, known to man and is contracted by having either directly or indirectly touched, carried or shifted a dead human body, or after having entered a roofed house or chamber where the corpse of a Jew is lying (conveyed by overshadowing).

Corpse uncleanness is first described in the Books of the Law conveyed by Moses to the nation of Israel, and where, for example, in Numbers 31:19, is the requisite to allow for a seven-day purification period after making physical contact with a human corpse.

== Grades of uncleanness ==
The Mishnah describes several grades of uncleanness. The human corpse itself is the most severe of them all, known as the "Father of fathers of all uncleanness" (prime origin). The person who touches a human corpse contracts a lower grade of uncleanness, known as the "Father of uncleanness" (Avi HaTum'ah). Once he has been defiled, if he touches any other human being, or foods and drinks, he renders them unclean (defiled) at a second remove, making them contract the First-grade level of uncleanness.

A dead human's bone the size of a barley grain, and a dead human's severed flesh the size of an olive's bulk are enough to convey corpse uncleanness when touched or carried. They do not, however, convey defilement by overshadowing.

During the time of the Second Temple, those persons who were defiled by the dead and who had not yet purified themselves by the ashes of the red heifer followed by immersion in a ritual bath were prohibited from entering the Court of the Israelites (inner court), located on the Temple Mount. Today, in Jewish law, the same stringency is said to apply.

== Defilement by overshadowing ==
Defilement by overshadowing (tumat ohel) applies to cases where the deceased person was of Israelite ancestry, but does not apply to corpses of Gentiles, unless physically touched. Where there were two houses divided by an adjoining wall and the corpse lay in one house (i.e. "overshadowed" by that house), if there was a hole or crevice in the dividing wall the size of a handbreadth in diameter, or what is approximately 8 cm. (3.1 inches) to 9 cm. (3.5 inches) (Hebrew: פותח טפח), defilement by the corpse passes to the other house as well. Any opening less than this defiles by a rabbinic decree. All liquids that came in contact with the airspace of that house are considered contaminated and must be poured out.

The laws of overshadowing apply to a corpse of a human adult, as well as to an aborted fetus. It may also apply to wherever there is a quantity of at least two-handfuls of "rottenness" from a decayed corpse (bones and flesh). It also applies to any human limb cut away from a living person, and where that same severed limb is whole, as at the time of creation, with flesh, ligaments (sinews) and bones. In such instances, it is as though it were a complete human corpse, defiling through touch, or through carrying, and by way of overshadowing. However, a human bone the size of a barley-grain is not enough to convey corpse uncleanness by overshadowing.

A quarter-log of blood (equivalent to the volume of 1½ eggs) from any dead human is enough to convey corpse uncleanness to a house if it came within the house.

Defilement by way of overshadowing is passed on to humans and to vessels that are in the airspace of the house where the corpse lies, but when the corpse is removed from the house, the house by overshadowing no longer defiles other humans or other vessels newly brought into that house. The house, without the corpse, is clean and requires no purification.

== Priestly laws ==
A Jew who is descended from a line of the priestly stock known as Kohen is not allowed to intentionally come into contact with a dead body, nor approach too closely to graves within a Jewish cemetery. In the land of Israel, it is also halachically prohibited unto persons of the priestly stock to enter a hospital in order to visit a patient where the majority of the patients are Jewish, unless he knows for certain that there are no Jewish corpses in the hospital. An ordinary priest of Aaron's lineage is, however, permitted to contract corpse uncleanness for any of his seven closest relatives that have died (father, mother, brother, unwedded sister, son, daughter, or wife), including a married sister by a rabbinic injunction.

Jewish priests were especially susceptible to contracting corpse uncleanness, due to the unmarked graves in foreign lands. Since they were required by a biblical injunction to eat their bread-offering (Terumah) in a state of ritual purity, and they could hardly know if they had trampled upon an unmarked grave, this prompted the early rabbis to decree a general-state of defilement upon all foreign lands. Public roads in the land of Israel, however, were assumed to be clean from corpse defilement, unless one knew for certain that he had touched human remains.

== Purification ==
The impurity that is caused by the dead is considered the ultimate impurity, one which cannot be purified through the waters of an ablution alone (mikvah). Human corpse uncleanness requires an interlude of seven days, accompanied by purification through sprinkling of the ashes of the Parah Adumah, the red heifer. However, the law is inactive, since neither the Temple in Jerusalem nor the red heifer are currently in existence, though without the latter, a Jew is forbidden to ascend to the site of the former. All are currently assumed to possess the impurity caused by touching a corpse.

Purification was required in the nation of Israel during Biblical times for the ceremonially unclean so that they would not defile God's tabernacle and put themselves in a position where they would become liable to extirpation (the act of being cut-off from Israel). An Israelite could become unclean by handling a dead body. In this situation, the uncleanness would last for at least seven days, until he could be purified again. Part of the cleansing process would be washing the body and clothes, and the unclean person would need to be sprinkled with the water of purification, without which he remains in a state of uncleanness and passes on defilement by touch to other persons.

== See also ==
- Prohibition of Kohen defilement by the dead
- Impurity of the land of the nations
- Ritual washing in Judaism
- Tumah and taharah
- Kegare
