= Naming taboo =

Cultural taboo in the Chinese cultural sphere

Chinese name
- Traditional Chinese: 避諱
- Simplified Chinese: 避讳
Transcriptions
Standard Mandarin
- Hanyu Pinyin: bìhuì
- Bopomofo: ㄅㄧˋ ㄏㄨㄟˋ
- Wade–Giles: pi4hui4
Yue: Cantonese
- Jyutping: bei6 wai5
Southern Min
- Tâi-lô: pī-huì

Vietnamese name
- Vietnamese alphabet: kỵ húy kiêng huý
- Hán-Nôm: 忌諱 𪬧諱

Korean name
- Hangul: 피휘
- Hanja: 避諱
Transcriptions
- Revised Romanization: pihwi
- McCune–Reischauer: p'ihwi

Japanese name
- Kanji: 避諱
- Hiragana: ひき
Transcriptions
- Revised Hepburn: hiki

A naming taboo is a cultural taboo against speaking or writing the given names of exalted persons, notably in China and within the Chinese cultural sphere. It was enforced by several laws throughout Imperial China, but its cultural and possibly religious origins predate the Qin dynasty. Not respecting the appropriate naming taboos was considered a sign of lacking education and respect, and brought shame both to the offender and the offended person.

== Types ==
- The naming taboo of the state (國諱 guóhuì) discouraged the use of the emperor's given name and those of his ancestors. For example, during the Qin dynasty, Qin Shi Huang's given name 政 Zhèng (< *‍OC B-S: *teŋ-s) was avoided, and the first month of the year, the upright month (正月; Zhèngyuè) had its pronunciation modified to Zhēngyuè (OC B-S: *teŋ, like 征 "to go on a long journey, to go on a military campaign") and then further renamed as the proper/upright month (端月; Duānyuè < OC, B-S *tˤor]). The strength of this taboo was reinforced by law; transgressors could expect serious punishment for writing an emperor's name without modifications. In 1777, Wang Xihou, in his dictionary, criticized the Kangxi dictionary and wrote the Qianlong Emperor's name without leaving out any stroke as required. This disrespect resulted in his and his family's executions and confiscation of their property (though all Wang Xihou's relatives were pardoned and spared execution).
- The naming taboo of the clan (家諱) discouraged the use of the names of one's own ancestors. Generally, ancestor names going back to seven generations were avoided. In diplomatic documents and letters between clans, each clan's naming taboos were observed.
- The naming taboo of the holinesses (聖人諱) discouraged the use of the names of respected people. For example, writing the name of Confucius was taboo during the Jin dynasty.

=== Methods to avoid offense ===
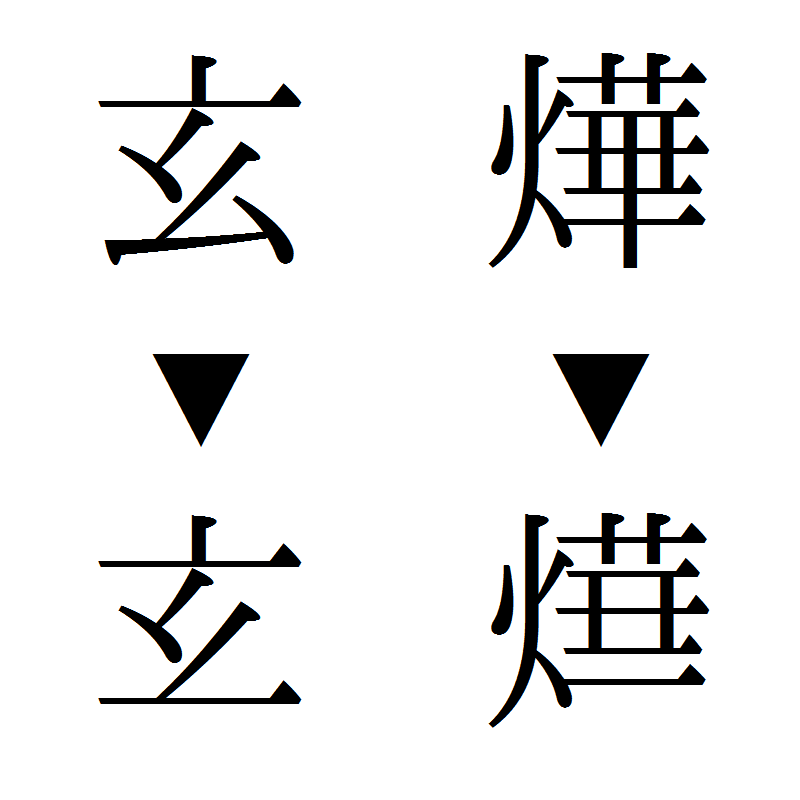
Avoidance of naming taboo: Example of omitting a stroke. The last stroke of each character of the Kangxi Emperor's given name "玄" (xuán) and "燁" (yè) is omitted. Failure to do this led to execution, like that of Wang Xihou.

There were three ways to avoid using a taboo character:

- Changing the character to another, usually a synonym or one which sounded similar to the character being avoided. For example, the Black Warrior Gate (玄武門; Xuanwu Gate) of the Forbidden City was renamed the Gate of Divine Might (神武門; Shenwu Gate) in order to avoid using a character from the Kangxi Emperor's name, Xuanye (玄燁).
- Leaving the character as a blank.
- Omitting a stroke in the character, usually the final stroke.
  - This gives rise to the surname Shuai (帥) from surname Shi (師) due to Sima Shi (司馬師), Emperor Jing of Jin.

== In history ==
Throughout Chinese history, there were emperors whose names contained common characters who would try to alleviate the burden of the populace in practicing name avoidance. For example, Emperor Xuan of Han, whose given name Bingyi (病已) contained two very common characters, changed his name to Xun (詢), a far less common character, with the stated purpose of making it easier for his people to avoid using his name. Similarly, Emperor Taizong of Tang, whose given name Shimin (世民) also contained two very common characters, ordered that name avoidance only required the avoidance of the characters Shi and Min in direct succession and that it did not require the avoidance of those characters in isolation.

However, Emperor Taizong's son Emperor Gaozong of Tang effectively made this edict ineffective after his death, by requiring the complete avoidance of the characters Shi and Min, necessitating the chancellor Li Shiji to change his name to Li Ji. In later dynasties, princes were frequently given names that contained uncommon characters to make it easier for the public to avoid them, should they become emperor later in life.

During the rule of the Ming Emperor of Han (Liu Zhuang), whose personal name was Zhuang, most people with surname Zhuang (莊) were ordered to change their names to its synonym Yan (嚴).

The custom of naming taboo had a built-in contradiction: without knowing what the emperors' names were, one could hardly be expected to avoid them, thus somehow the emperors' names had to be informally transmitted to the populace to allow them to take cognizance of and thus avoid using said characters. In one famous incident in 435, during the Northern Wei dynasty, Goguryeo ambassadors made a formal request that the imperial government issue them a document containing the emperors' names so that they could avoid offending the emperor while submitting their king's petition. Emperor Taiwu of Northern Wei agreed and issued them such a document. However, the mechanism of how the regular populace would be able to learn the emperors' names remained generally unclear throughout Chinese history.

This taboo is important to keep in mind when studying ancient historical texts from the cultural sphere, as historical characters and/or locations may be renamed if they happen to share a name with the emperor in power (or previous emperors of the same dynasty) when the text was written. Thus, the study of naming taboos can also help date an ancient text.

== In other countries ==
=== Japan ===
Japan was also influenced by the naming taboo. In modern Japan, it concerns only the successive emperors. For example, whether oral or written, people only refer to the reigning emperor as Tennō Heika (天皇陛下; his Majesty the Emperor) or Kinjō Heika (今上陛下; his current Majesty). See also posthumous name.

Historically, it was considered very rude among the upper class to call someone by their given name, even if it was the lord calling his vassals. Calling someone by their given name was equivalent to picking a fight. Titles or pseudonyms were often used when calling others in place of their given names.

=== Vietnam ===
Chinese Character	Original Reading	Deviated Reading	Name
承	thằng	thừa	Trần Thằng (陳承)
利	lị	lợi	Lê Lị (黎利)
黄	hoàng	huỳnh	Nguyễn Hoàng (阮潢)
金/今	câm	kim	Nguyễn Cam (阮淦)
周	chu	châu	Nguyễn Phúc Chu (阮福淍)
映	ánh	yếng	Nguyễn Phúc Ánh (阮福暎)
時	thì	thời	Nguyễn Phúc Thì (阮福時)
山	san	sơn	Nguyễn Phúc Vĩnh San (阮福永珊)

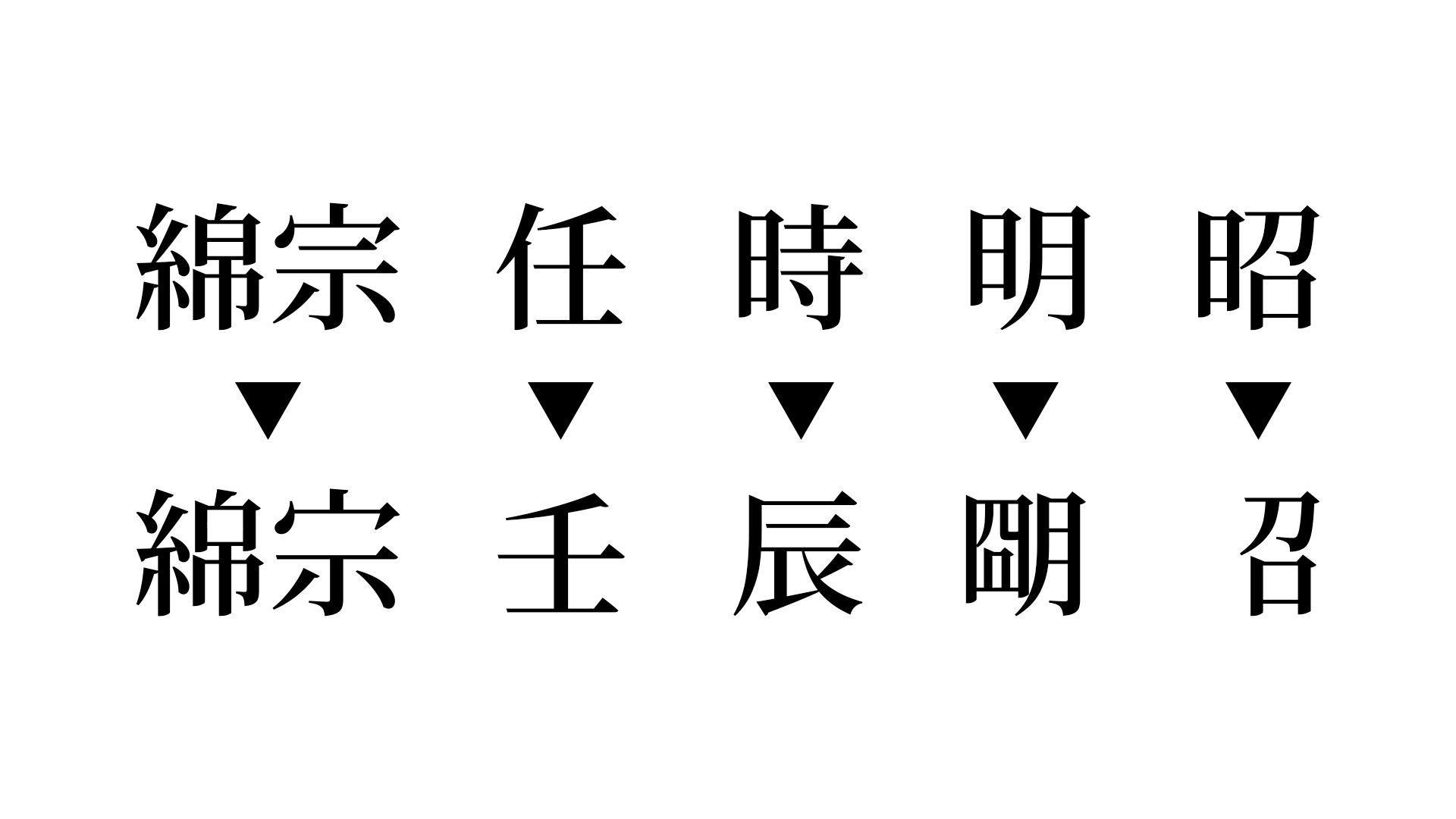
Naming taboo during the Nguyễn dynasty

In Vietnam, naming taboos were also observed since the beginning of Vietnamese independence. Characters in texts avoid taboos by omitting strokes (such as in the case with Hồ Thị Hoa 胡氏華 where the last stroke of 華 was not written), using variant characters (such as with Lê Lợi 黎利, 利 was written as [⿱⿰巜巜⿰刂禾]), and using similar characters (such as in the case with Tự Đức, the character 辰 thần/thìn was used to write 時 thì; it also has the meaning of "time"). Similar to Southern China, the taboos also applied to pronunciation as well. One such example is the name of rice paper, bánh đa (Northern dialect): it was originally named bánh tráng, and was renamed due to it being homophonous with Trịnh Tráng 鄭梉. Naming taboos have caused some chữ Hán to have multiple readings. The character 武, a surname, has two readings; it is pronounced as Vũ in the north, but is pronounced as Võ in the south due to the naming taboo of Nguyễn Phúc Miên Vũ (阮福綿宇).

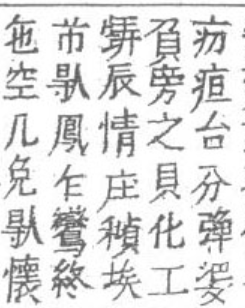
辰 thần/thìn was used to write 時 thì to avoid the naming taboo of emperor Tự Đức.

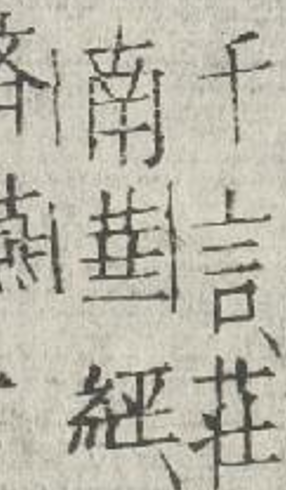
Omission of the last stroke of 華 to avoid writing Hồ Thị Hoa's name

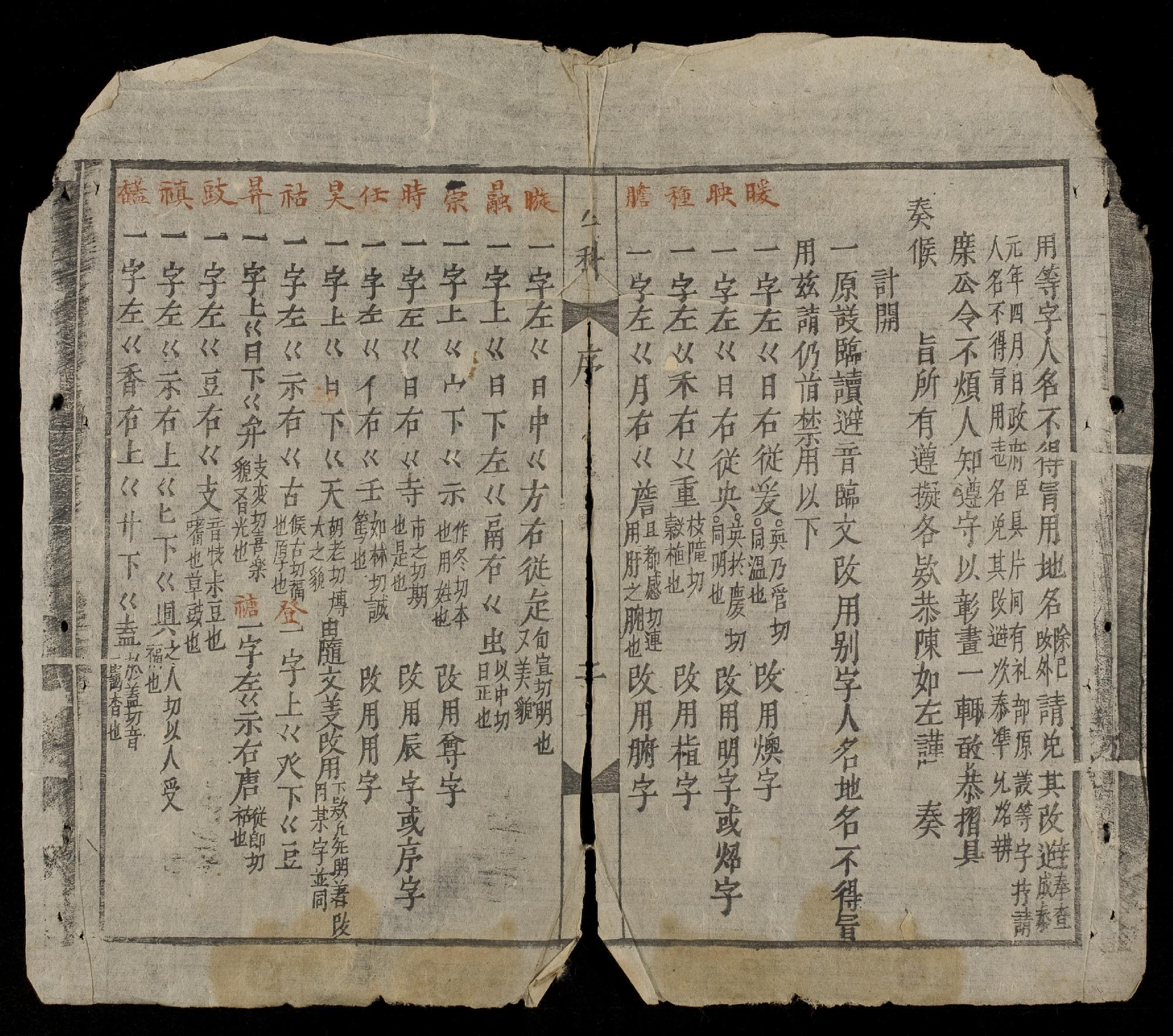
Naming taboos shown in the book, Hà Nam trường hương thí văn (河南場鄕試文選), an anthology of essays from the 1894 provincial examination.

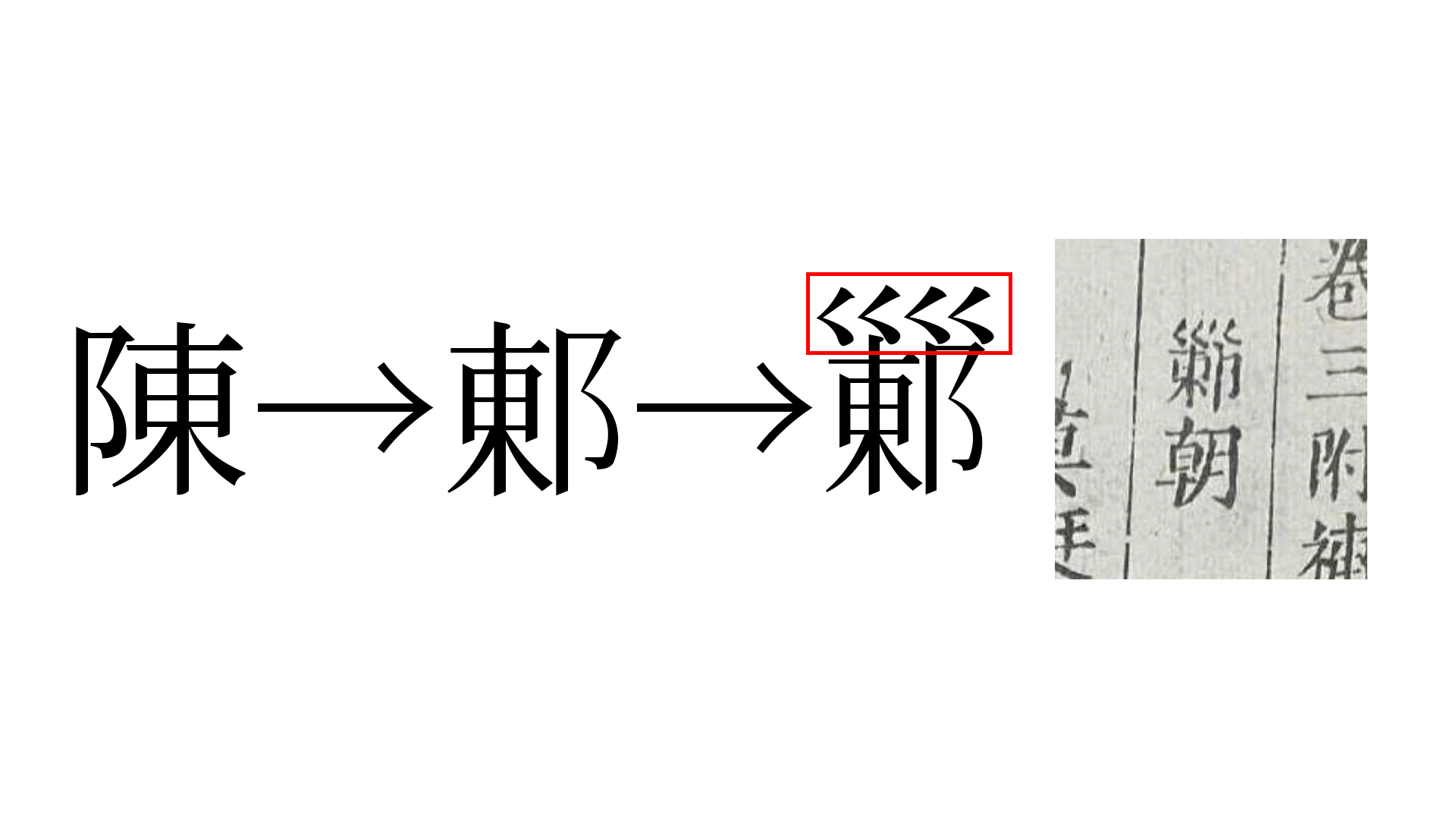
An example of a Lê dynasty naming taboo marker. The character is first reversed then a marker is added above. This is the taboo character of Phạm Thị Ngọc Trần (范氏玉陳; 1386 – 1425). The tabooed character should be read as Trình.

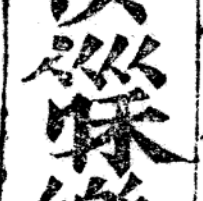
The character 利 lợi with taboo markers to avoid writing Lê Lợi's name

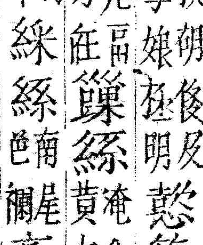
Naming taboo of Hồ Hán Thương, 踝 hỏa has taboo markers added.

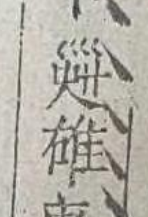
The character anh 英 written with Lê dynasty taboo markers in the word anh hùng 英䧺 "hero".

== See also ==
- Avoidance speech
- Imperial examination in Chinese mythology, example
- Names of God in Judaism, similar taboo
- Taboo on rulers, similar taboo
- Taboo against naming the dead, similar taboo in many cultures
- Damnatio memoriae, not naming as a mark of disrespect
- Voldemort effect
