= Prohibition of Kohen defilement by the dead =

Commandment to Jewish priests

The prohibition of Kohen defilement to the dead is the commandment to a Jewish priest (kohen) not to come in direct contact with, or be in the same enclosed roofed space as a dead human body.

== Hebrew Bible ==
The command forbidding the priest from becoming ritually impure through contact with a dead body is stated in the Book of Leviticus:

And the LORD said to Moses: Speak to the priests the sons of Aaron, and say to them: None shall be defiled for the dead among his people. Except for his flesh who are close to him - for his mother and for his father, for his son and for his daughter, and for his brother, and for his sister who is close to him, who has not married a man - for her he may be defiled.

== Rabbinical literature ==
The priest's wife is not mentioned as one of the close relatives for whom he may become impure, seemingly implying that he is forbidden to do so. However, halakha permits a priest to become impure for his wife. Some traditional and modern scholarly sources justify this ruling in various ways: 1) The wife is included in "his flesh who are close to him"; 2) The inclusion of the wife in this law was so obvious it did not need to be stated; 3) In many of the Torah's laws, a man's wife is not mentioned even when other male and female relatives are mentioned and it seems clear from context that wives should be included too.

=== Enclosures ===
A Kohen is forbidden to enter any house or enclosure ("ohel", tent) in which a dead body (or part thereof), may be found (Leviticus 10:6, Leviticus 21:1–5, Ezekiel 44:20, Ezekiel 44:25). Practical examples of these prohibitions include: not entering a cemetery or attending a funeral; not being under the same roof (i.e. in a home or hospital) as a dismembered organ.

Rabbinic prohibition further limits the Kohen of coming within four amoth of an outdoor (i.e. no roof or overhang present) corpse or grave. If a fence or groove with a height or depth of 10 tefachim separates the kohen from the grave, he must stay four tefachim of the corpse or grave.

=== Non-Jews ===
There is a Tannaic dispute as to whether the prohibition of defilement is applicable to the corpse of a non-Jew. Rabbi Shimon bar Yochai claims that the corpses of non-Jews do not cause defilement, but the Gemara goes on questioning this claim and comes to no clear conclusion.

=== Exceptions ===
==== Meit mitzvah, commandment of burying ====
The Talmud prescribes that if a priest, even the High Priest, chances upon a corpse by the wayside, and there is no one else in the area who can be called upon to bury it, then the priest himself must forgo the requirement to abstain from defilement and perform the burial of this person (a meit mitzvah).

==== Death of a nasi ====
The Talmud Yerushalmi and Talmud Bavli quote an instance where the restriction of a kohen to defile himself to a corpse was ostensibly waived. In the case of the death of a nasi (top rabbinic leader of a religious academy). The Talmud relates that when Judah haNasi died, the priestly laws forbidding defilement through contact with the dead were temporarily suspended, for the specific purpose of making possible full participation of his burial ceremony.

However, there is a dispute among the commentators of the Talmud over whether the severe biblical prohibition itself was suspended. Some indeed maintain so, yet others explain that the prohibition waived was only a lesser prohibition regarding 'beit hapras', (a field in which there is a lost and unmarked grave).

The special permission granted to kohanim, according to some Talmud commentators, to defile themselves for the sake of a deceased rabbi, applied only to a deceased nasi, or—arguably—supreme rabbinic leaders of a status similar to that of a nasi, and even in that case—only for the very day of the funeral. The special permission did not apply to other rabbis or tzaddikim (righteous rabbinic leaders). It is recorded that some renowned tzaddikim deliberately expressed to those present at the time of their imminent passing that those kohens (or pure vessels) present should make an immediate exit (be removed from the premises) so as not to become 'tammei (defiled). These leaders include the popular nasi Yochanan ben Zakai (Talmud Yerushalmi to Avodah Zarah 18a) and also Isaac Luria.

=== Leniency ===
With the prohibition of Kohen defilement often posing challenges to the Kohen, leniency is often sought in the form of a rabbinic hetter (permit) for the Kohen to become unclean. One primary source of lenient application focuses on the beraita of Evel Rabbati (Semachot).

== Prohibition reasons ==
Since the Kohanim serve a unique role in Judaism, particularly by serving in the Temple in Jerusalem, the Torah requires them to follow unique rules of ritual purity. Generally, the prohibition of the Kohen becoming impure (tammei) by contact with a corpse is considered in full effect in modern times and is maintained in Orthodox Judaism.

Rabbi Menachem Mendel Schneerson describes the restriction of the Kohen defiling himself by contact with a corpse due to a corpse being a contradiction to godliness (God is understood as the source of vitality and life), which negates the designation of a Kohen who is to maintain a holy state in his service to God—even in the diaspora. Schneerson maintains that the corpse can cause metaphysical interference to the Kohen's spiritual abilities.

== Modern applications ==
Orthodox Jewry maintains that the modern-day Kohen is obligated to guard himself from defilement to a corpse, leading to restrictions that the modern Kohen needs to consider when met with common occurrences of the Jewish life cycle.

=== Cemeteries ===
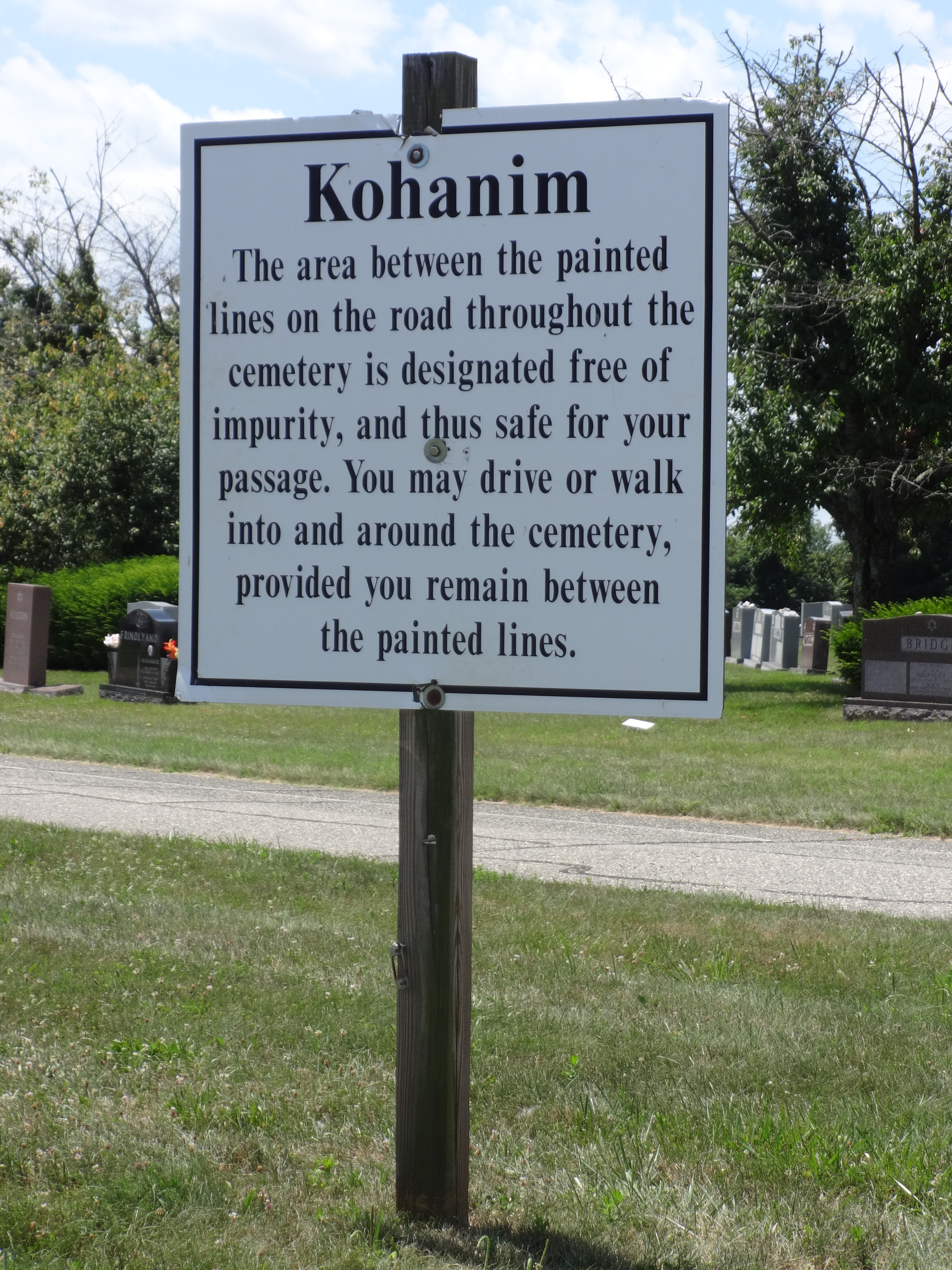
Arrangements for Kohanim at Beth Jacob Cemetery, Finksburg, Maryland

In order to protect the Kohen from coming into prohibited contact with or proximity to the dead, Orthodox cemeteries traditionally designate a burial ground for Kohanim and their families which is at a distance from the general burial ground, so that the relatives of Kohanim can be visited by a Kohen without him entering the cemetery.

=== Hospitals ===
Kohanim are required not to be in a hospital where a dead body or body parts may be present. This poses a challenge when a Kohen wants to be present when his wife gives birth. A hetter (rabbinic permit) is generally given by a rabbi for a one time entry for the Kohen to be present at his wife's delivery.

Giving birth poses an additional concern if the baby is a boy: Halakha states that an infant or juvenile kohen is likewise forbidden from becoming unclean by contact with a corpse, while the adult must ensure that the juvenile or infant kohen do not accidentally transgress this law. Thus, many kohanim choose a birthing center or hospital with the maternity ward located in a separate building from the hospital morgue, so as to not make their newborn son ritually impure.

Hospitals with special arrangements to facilitate entry of kohanim include:

Hospital name	Specifics	Hospital Rabbi
Maimonides Medical Center	Light signal throughout hospital notifying Kohens to exit when corpse is present	
New York Methodist Hospital	Morgue located in side building. Morgue entry is accessed by double doors	Rabbi Hecht
Long Island Jewish Medical Center	Morgue located in basement of main building	

=== Airlines ===
Kohanim attempt to avoid boarding an airplane that is also carrying a dead body or body parts, as the airplane may be considered an "enclosure" transmitting impurity to all people inside it. In addition, if the plane flies over a graveyard, people in the plane may become impure.
