= Sacred Sperm =

- Directed by: Ori Gruder (aka Or Yashar)
- Written by: Ori Gruder; Oded Farber; Eado Zuckerman
- Produced by: Galit Benglas; Eado Zuckerman
- Release dates: 2 October 2014 (Raindance Film Festival); January 2015
- Running time: 74 minutes
- Country: Israel
- Language: Hebrew with English subtitles

Sacred Sperm (Hebrew: זרע קודש) is a 2014 Israeli documentary film directed by Ori Gruder, exploring the taboo of masturbation in Judaism. The TV version of the film world premiered at the 22nd Raindance Film Festival in October 2014 and was nominated in the short documentary film category at the end of 2014 Ophir Awards. The theatrical long version of the movie premiered at the 30th Santa Barbara Film Festival in February 2015. The Eastern Europe Premier was at the 55th Kraków International Film Festival mid 2015. This movie won the Accolade Global Film Competition - Award of Excellence at December 2014 and took the first prize Best Documentary at the 18th Religion Today Int' film festival in Italy at October 2015 and has been screened at more than 30 film festivals worldwide. The educational channel of Sweden screened the film during 2015 and it was chosen to be in the 10th most popular films of the year. Since the TV version became online In Israel itself already more than half a million viewers watched it through Hot, ynet and VOD options.

== Background ==
The Jewish prohibition against masturbation is codified in the Kitzur Shulchan Aruch (Chapter 151:1), which states, "It is forbidden to discharge semen in vain. This is a graver sin than any other in the Torah". The Kitzur Shulchan Aruch goes on to describe the repercussions from this sin and offers men suggestions for avoiding it. In Torah-observant circles, masturbation is forbidden, and sexual intercourse with a member of the opposite sex is restricted to married couples only. Viewing secular media and using an unfiltered internet is also generally discouraged.

Gruder became a member of the Breslov Hasidic community at the age of 30, having previously led a secular Jewish lifestyle working in the television industry. One of his motivations behind the film was to learn how to approach the topic of sex education with his 10-year-old son. He received backing from a rabbi for the film, despite both the film premise and broadcast medium being prohibited on religious grounds. A plotline in "The Contest", an episode from American sitcom Seinfeld, was an inspiration for Gruder during production.

== Synopsis ==
Gruder meets with several rabbis to discuss the subject of masturbation within Haredi society. He learns how Haredi teenage boys traditionally deal with the subject, with various relaxation exercises, and also discovers that Haredi men are taught not to touch their penises while urinating. Gruder also explains the measures he takes as repentance for his past sins; including immersing himself in a mikveh full of ice cubes, fasting, charitable monetary donations and praying – while rolling in the snow at Mount Hermon during winter.

== Reception ==
The film premiered at the 22nd Raindance Film Festival in London on 2 October 2014. It was shortlisted in the short documentary film category at the 2014 Ophir Awards, losing out to Keren Shayo's film The Sound of Torture. A 60-minute version of the film premiered in Israel at the Jerusalem Film Festival at the Jerusalem Cinematheque in December 2014 and on Television on Hot cable Channel 8; the full long version is being distributed in Europe by Go2Films and in North America by Menemsha films

== See also ==
- "Every Sperm Is Sacred"
