= Av HaTumah =

In the realm of tumah and taharah terminology, the term Av HaTumah ("father of uncleanness," or simply Av) is a rabbinic term for a person or object that is in a state of tumah (ritual impurity), second in severity only to corpse uncleanness. Anything suffering from Av HaTumah ("Father of uncleanness"), such as carrion, the blood of a menstruate woman, seminal fluid, etc., can render those persons who touch it defiled at a further remove, known as a "first-grade level of uncleanness."

A person or object that is an Av HaTumah has the ability to transfer its tumah to another person or object, such as clothing (usually at a downgraded level of tumah), while they, in turn, have the ability to transfer their tumah to both foods and drink (in the case of foods, at a downgraded level, but in the case of drinks, at the very same level).

There are two types of Av HaTumah, the first being one textually listed in the Torah (D'Oraita), such as the carcass of any of the eight creeping things named in Leviticus 11:29-30, or a seminal issue (Leviticus 15), inter alia; the second being one of rabbinic origin (D'Rabbanan), such as a grave area that had been ploughed, or any foreign land, or a dead human's bone the size of a barleycorn, among other things.

== Examples ==
An Av HaTumah is generally a person or object that is listed in the Torah. Common examples of an Av HaTumah include a zav, zavah, niddah, metzorah (leper), and midras.

== Purification ==
A person or object that is under Av HaTumah status can usually be purified by immersion in a mikveh and the elapse of sunset.
