= Merkaz Mikvaot Chabad =

- מרכז מקוואות חב"ד
- Founded at: 2007
- Location: Israel
- Director: Chaim Eliyahu Gluchovsky
- Website: www.mikvaot.co.il

Merkaz Mikvaot Chabad or Center of Chabad Mikvaos in Israel (Hebrew: מרכז מקוואות חב"ד) is a Chabad organization that promotes the establishment and renovation of Mikvahs (ritual baths) across Israel. The center is an arm of the Chabad Beit Din of Israel and was established in 2007. It's stated goal is to establish and strengthen Chabad Mikvahs throughout the country, with an emphasis on raising the national level of purity and the beautification of Mikvahs. The center is managed by Rabbi Chaim Eliyahu Gluchovsky, rabbi of the Chabad community of Ramat Beit Shemesh. The primary source of funding for the center's activities comes from public donations.

As of 2020, there were over 220 Chabad mikvahs in Israel as part of the Center of Chabad Mikvahs in Israel's network. The center has inspected 150 Mikvahs, provided grants to over 70 Mikvahs, and performed rainwater replacement for 120 Mikvahs.

== Services ==
The center provides multiple services:

- Financial assistance for the renovation and construction of Chabad mikvah.
- Halachic and professional mikvah construction guidance.
- Inspection and supervision tours of the halachic kosherness of Mikvahs.
- Public outreach to increase awareness of the spiritual reasons for Mikvahs.
- Replacement of rainwater tanks.
- Local Mikvah purification team trainings.

== Publications ==
Chabad Be'Tahara (Hebrew: חב"ד בטהרה)
