= Ritual washing in Judaism =

Washing and bathing rituals in Judaism

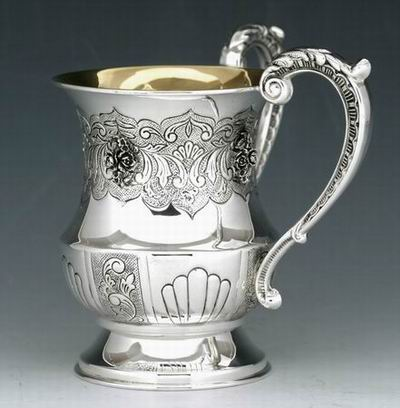
A silver washing cup used for netilat yadayim

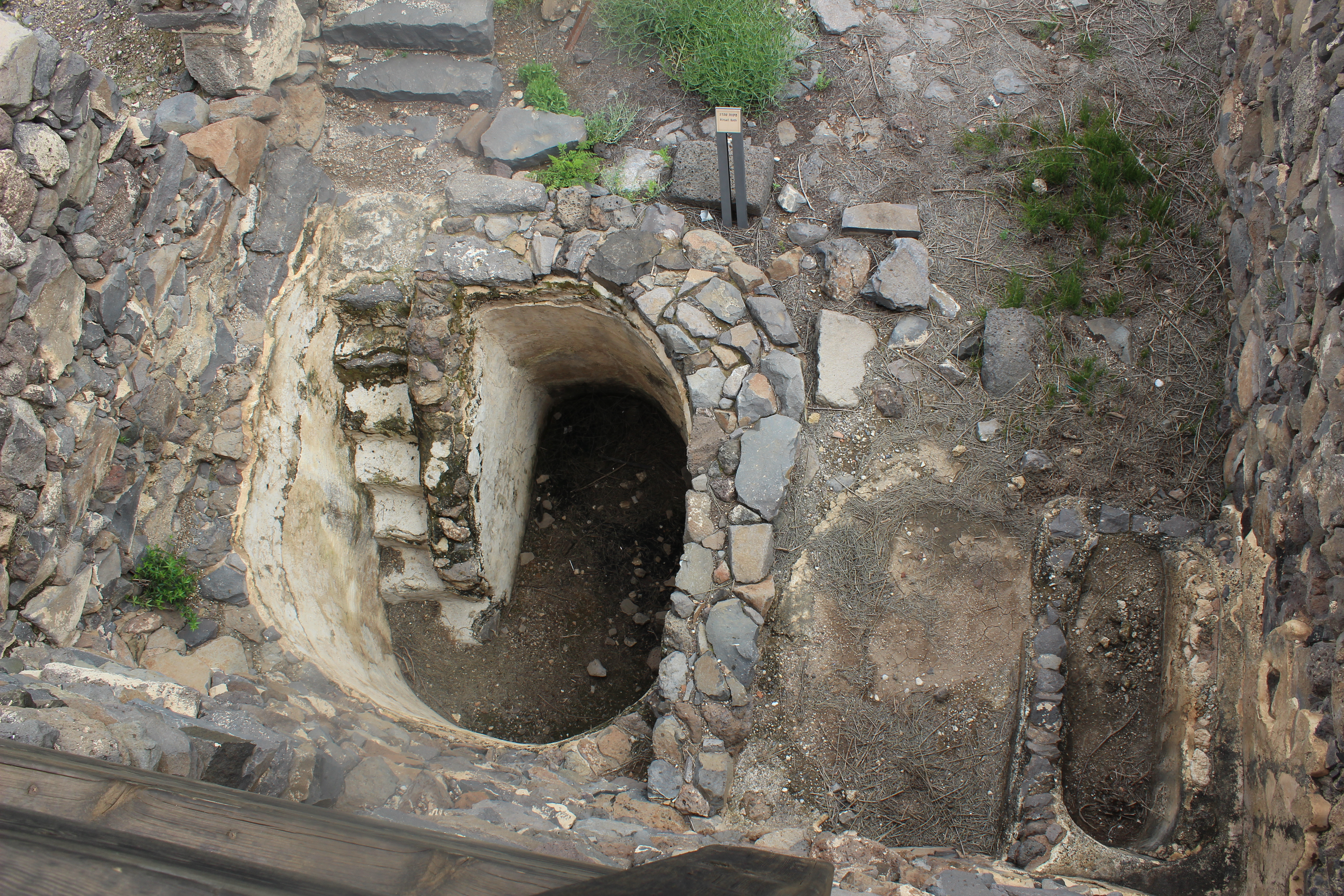
Ancient mikveh unearthed at Gamla

In Judaism, ritual washing, or ablution, takes two main forms. Tevilah (Hebrew: טְבִילָה, romanized: ṭəb̲îlā) is a full body immersion in a mikveh, and netilat yadayim is the washing of the hands with a cup (see Handwashing in Judaism).

References to ritual washing are found in the Hebrew Bible, and are elaborated in the Mishnah and Talmud. They have been codified in various codes of Jewish law and tradition, such as Maimonides' Mishneh Torah (12th century) and Joseph Karo's Shulchan Aruch (16th century). These practices are most commonly observed within Orthodox Judaism. In Conservative Judaism, the practices are normative, with certain leniencies and exceptions. Ritual washing is not generally performed in Reform Judaism.

== Hebrew Bible ==
The Hebrew Bible requires immersion of the body in water as a means of purification in several circumstances, for example:

And when the zav is cleansed of his issue, then he shall number to himself seven days for his cleansing, and wash his clothes; and he shall bathe his flesh in running water, and shall be clean.

There are also references to hand-washing in Leviticus 15:11, "All those whom the one with the discharge touches without his having rinsed his hands in water shall wash their clothes and bathe in water and be unclean until the evening." and in Psalms 26:6, "I wash my hands in innocence, and walk around Your altar, O LORD."

Priests were required to wash their hands and feet before service in the ritual sites:

“You shall make a bronze basin with a bronze stand for washing. You shall put it between the tent of meeting and the altar, and you shall put water in it; with the water Aaron and his sons shall wash their hands and their feet. When they go into the tent of meeting or when they come near the altar to minister to make an offering by fire to the Lord, they shall wash with water, so that they may not die.

— Exodus 30:18-20

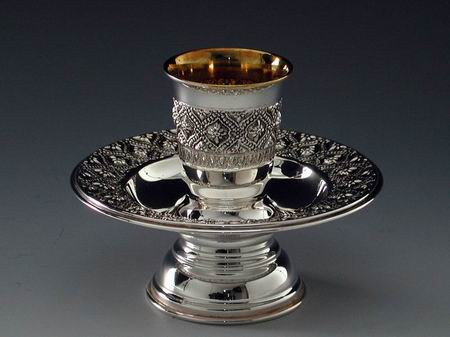
A Silver Mayim Acharonim Set

== Washing the hands ==
According to halakha or custom, the hands are washed several times. These include before and after eating a meal with bread, upon waking in the morning, after using the toilet, before eating karpas in the Passover seder, and before prayer. On some occasions, the water must be poured from a cup; on others, it may be delivered by any means, such as a faucet. A blessing is recited on some occasions.

== Full-body immersion ==
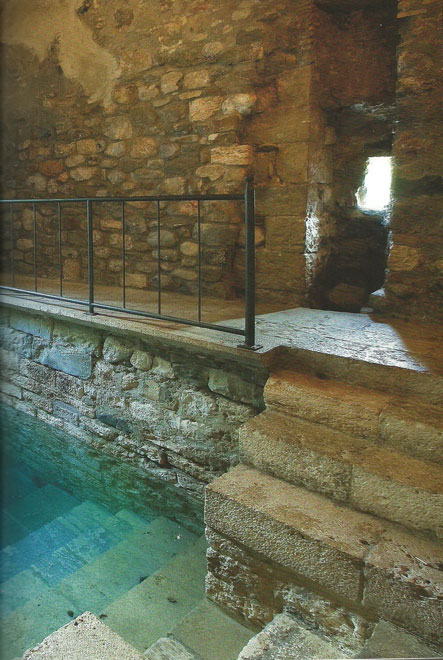
A medieval mikveh for the purpose of ritual immersion in Besalú, Spain

Depending on the circumstances, such ritual bathing might require immersion in "living water"—either a natural stream or a mikveh, a specially constructed ritual bath connected directly to a natural source of water such as a spring. There are several occasions on which biblical or rabbinical regulations require immersion of the whole body. For example, the impurity of zav is unique in that it cannot be purified by immersion in a normal mikve but requires immersion in a spring of living water.

This article discusses immersion requirements in Rabbinic Judaism and its descendants. Other branches of Judaism, such as Haymanot, have substantially different practices, including requiring an actual spring or stream.

=== Current practice ===
Occasions on which full-body immersion is currently practiced include:

- After a woman's niddah period concludes following menstruation or other uterine bleeding, she must immerse and only then is permitted to resume sexual relations with her husband. This practice remains the principal use of contemporary mikvehs. It is fully observed in Orthodox Judaism, and normative in Conservative Judaism.
- Some Orthodox men immerse after having a seminal discharge (keri).
- In Orthodox Judaism, there is a widespread minhag for men to immerse themselves on the day before Yom Kippur, and many do so before the Three Pilgrimage Festivals and before Rosh Hashanah. Many also immerse themselves before the Shabbat, and many (primarily Hasidic Jews) do so daily before morning prayers.
- A convert to Judaism must immerse.
- Taharah, ("Purification"), the ritual washing and cleansing, and immersion in a mikveh according to many customs, of a Jew's body prior to burial
- Prior to ascending the Temple Mount (by those Orthodox or Masorti authorities who permit ascending the Temple Mount)
- In Hassidic Judaism, men regularly shower daily before immersing in the mikvah before prayer each morning.

=== Past practice ===
==== Bodily fluids and skin conditions ====
The Torah prescribes rituals addressing the skin condition known as tzaraath and unusual genital discharges in a man or woman (Zav/Zavah), which required special sacrifices and rituals in the days of the Temple in Jerusalem including immersion in a mikveh.

The practice of checking for tzaraath fell out of use with the destruction of the Temple in Jerusalem and the end of sacrificial rites. However, each of the other requirements remains in effect to some extent in Orthodox Judaism and (to a lesser degree) in Conservative Judaism.

==== Zavah ====
A woman experiencing uterine blood, not part of normal menstruation, was classified as a zavah in the days of the Temple in Jerusalem and remained in a state of ritual impurity for seven days before immersion. Today, the law of zavah remains in effect in Orthodox Judaism, in two respects. Due to extreme conditions in Roman Palestine in the time of the Amoraim, women's periods became irregular, and women became unable to determine whether or not their discharges were regular (niddah) or irregular (zavah). As a result, women adapted a stringency combining the niddah and zavah periods, refraining from intercourse and physical contact with their husbands for seven days of the zavah period following menstruation, for a total of approximately 12 days per month, which Orthodox women continue to observe today. The laws of zavah are also applied, as in Biblical times, to uterine blood discharges outside regular menstruation. Such circumstances are often interpreted leniently, however, and rabbinic stratagems have been devised to lessen their severity. Women experiencing irregularities (droplets) are sometimes advised to wear coloured underwear to mitigate the detectability of evidence of zavah status and hence a need to determine that a woman is a zavah.

==== Keri ====
Men experiencing a seminal discharge, including through regular marital intercourse, were prohibited from entering the Temple in Jerusalem and required to immerse in a mikveh, remaining ritually impure until the evening. The Talmud ascribes to the Great Assembly of Ezra a Rabbinic decree imposing further restrictions on men ritually impure from a seminal discharge, including a prohibition on studying Torah and from participating in services.

Maimonides wrote a responsum lifting the decree of Ezra, based on an opinion in the Talmud stating that it had failed to be observed by a majority of the community and the Jewish people found themselves unable to sustain it. However, Maimonides continued to follow the Keri restrictions as a matter of personal observance. Since then, observance of the rules of Keri and hence regular mikveh use by men fell into disuse in many communities. Hasidic Judaism, however, revived the practice of regular mikveh use, advocating regular daily mikveh use as a way of achieving spiritual purity. The growth of Hasidic Judaism resulted in a revival of mikveh use by men. In addition, some Sephardic and Mizrahi communities continued to observe the rules of keri throughout.

==== Contact with an animal carcass ====
According to Leviticus, anyone who comes into contact with or carries any creature that had not been deliberately killed by shechita was regarded by the biblical regulations as having made themselves unclean by doing so, and therefore was compelled to immerse their entire body. This regulation is immediately preceded by the rule against eating anything still containing blood, and according to biblical scholars this is also the context of the regulation about not eating non-sacrifices—that the regulation only treats such consumption as unclean if there is a risk of blood remaining within the carcass. In the version of this regulation in Deuteronomy, eating the bodies of such creatures is not described as making an individual ritually impure, nor requires the eater to wash their body, but instead, such consumption is expressly forbidden, although the creature is allowed to be passed on to a non-Jew, who is permitted to eat it.

==== Contact with a corpse ====
Anyone who came into contact with a cadaver or grave was so ritually impure that they had to be sprinkled with the water produced from the red heifer ritual, in order to become pure again; however, the person who carried out the red heifer ritual and who sprinkled the water was to be treated as having become ritually impure by doing so. According to Cheyne and Black, this ritual derives from the same origin as the ritual described in the Book of Deuteronomy for a group of people to atone for murder by an unknown perpetrator, according to which a heifer is killed at a stream and hands are washed over it; Peake believed that these are both ultimately cases of sympathetic magic, and similar rituals existed in Greek and Roman mythology. The Masoretic Text describes the water produced from the red heifer ritual as a sin offering; some English translations discount this detail, because it differs from other sin offerings by not being killed at the altar, although biblical scholars believe that this demonstrates a failure by these translations to understand the meaning of sin offerings.

==== Treatment of a corpse ====
No explicit regulations are expressed in the bible concerning the treatment of a corpse itself, although historic rabbinical sources saw an implication that the dead should be thoroughly washed per Ecclesiastes, as children are washed when born; according to Raavyah, a prominent rishon, argued that the corpse should be cleansed carefully, including the ears and fingers, with nails pared and hair combed, so that the corpse could be laid to rest in the manner that the person had visited the synagogue during life. Washing of corpses was not observed among the Jews living in Persian Babylon, for which they were criticised as dying in filth, without a candle and without a bath; at the time, the non-Jewish Persians were predominantly Zoroastrian, and consequently believed that dead bodies were inherently ritually unclean, and should be exposed to the elements in a Tower of Silence to avoid defiling the earth with them.

In the early periods, the body was washed in a standard mikveh, and this is frequently the form of the ritual in the present day, but the traditional washing ceremony, known as tahara, became quite detailed over time. A special building for the corpse-washing existed in the cemetery in 15th century Prague, a practice which obtains in many Jewish communities today; a mikveh is provided at a number of ancient tombs. Female corpses are traditionally cleaned only by other females, and males only by other males.

Between death and the traditional ceremony, the body is placed on the ground, and covered with a sheet, and at the start of the traditional ceremony, the body is lifted from the ground onto a special board or slab (a tahara board), so that it lies facing the door, with a white sheet underneath. The clothes are then removed from the corpse (if they were not removed when the corpse was placed on the ground), and at this point Ezekiel 5:15 is recited by the enactors of the ritual, as it refers to the removal of filthy clothes. Following this, the body is thoroughly rubbed with lukewarm water, with the mouth of the corpse covered so that water does not enter it; the next part of the ritual is the pouring of water over the head, while Ezekiel 36:25 is quoted, since it refers to the sprinkling of water to produce cleanness; and then each limb is washed downwards, while Canticles 5:11 and the following verses, which describe the beauty of elements of the body, are spoken. Finally, nine measures of cold water are poured over the body while it is upright, which is the core element of the ceremony, and it is then dried (according to some customs), and enshrouded; in ancient times the hair and nails were also cut, but by the 19th century, the hair was merely combed, and the nails were just cleansed with a special pin, unless their length is excessive. After the ceremony, the taharah board is washed and dried, but is kept facing the same way, as there is the belief that turning it the other way will cause another person to die within three days. Many communities have replaced the pouring of nine measures by immersion in a specially constructed mikveh.

A more elaborate ceremony, known as the grand washing (rechitzah gedolah, רחיצה גדולה), is available for the corpses of the more significant individuals; Hillel the Elder is traditionally credited with its invention. According to this latter form of ceremony, the water used for washing was perfumed by rose, myrtle, or aromatic spices; the use of spices was an ancient practice, and the Mishnah especially mentions the washing ceremonies using myrtle.

==== Yom Kippur ====
The biblical regulations of Yom Kippur require the officiating Jewish High Priest to bathe himself in water after sending off the scapegoat to Azazel, and a similar requirement was imposed on the person who led the scapegoat away, and the person who burned the sacrifices during the rituals of the day. The Mishnah states that the High Priest had to immerse himself five times, and his hands and feet had to be washed ten times.

== Reason for contemporary observance ==
Both Orthodox and Conservative Judaism currently have multiple views on the reason for contemporary observance of ritual washing and immersion obligation.

In Orthodox Judaism, opinion is generally split between a view that maintains that those Biblical rules related to ritual purity that are possible to observe in the absence of a Temple and a red heifer remain in force, and Jews remain Biblically-obligated to observe such of them as they can, and a view that Biblical ritual impurity requirements apply only in the presence of a Temple in Jerusalem, and the current rules represent only rabbinic ordinances, practices decreed by the Rabbis in memory of the Temple.

In December 2006, Conservative Judaism's Committee on Jewish Law and Standards issued three responses on the subject of Niddah. All three ruled the traditional requirements of ritual washing remained in effect for Conservative Jews (with some leniencies and liberalization of interpretation), but disagreed on the reasoning for continuing this practices, as well as on the validity of specific leniencies. Two of the opinions reflect reasoning similar to the respective Orthodox views (Biblical requirements or rabbinic ordinances enacted in remembrance of the Temple.) A third opinion expressed the view that Conservative Judaism should disconnect ritual purity practices from the Temple in Jerusalem or its memory, and offered a new approach based on what it called the concept of holiness, rather than the concept of purity. Thus, Conservative Judaism, under its philosophy of pluralism, supports a range of views on this subject, from views similar to the Orthodox view to views expressing a need for a contemporary re-orientation.

== History and commentary ==
Both traditional religious and secular scholars agree that ritual washing in Judaism was derived by the Rabbis of the Talmud from a more extensive set of ritual washing and purity practices in use in the days of the Temple in Jerusalem, based on various verses in the Hebrew Scriptures and received traditions. There is disagreement, however, about the origins and meanings of these practices.

Philo of Alexandria refers to ritual washing in the context of the Temple and Leviticus, but also speaks of spiritual "washing". At Qumran, basins which served as baths have been identified, and among the Dead Sea scrolls, texts on maintaining ritual purity reflect the requirements of Leviticus.

According to the editors of the 1906 Jewish Encyclopedia, the phrase netilat yadaim referring to washing of the hands, literally "lifting of the hands", is derived either from Psalm 134:2, or from the Greek word natla (αντλίον in Hebrew נַטְלָה), in reference to the jar of water used. The Jewish Encyclopedia states that many historic Jewish writers, and particularly the Pharisees, took it to mean that water had to be poured out onto uplifted hands, and that they could not be considered clean until water had reached the wrist. The Christian New Testament states that in Jesus' time, "Pharisees, and all the Jews" would not eat until they had washed their hands to the wrist, and it was noteworthy that Jesus and his followers did not wash.

According to the Jewish Encyclopedia, the historic requirement for priests to first wash their hands, together with the classical rabbinical belief that non-priest were also required to wash their hands before taking part in a holy act, such as prayer, was adhered to very strongly, to the extent that Christianity adopted the practice, and provided worshippers with fountains and basins of water in Churches, in a similar manner to the "Molten Sea" in the Jerusalem Temple functioning as a laver. Although Christianity did not adopt the requirement for priests to wash feet before worship, in Islam the practice was extended to the congregation and expanded into wudu.

According to Peake's Commentary on the Bible, Biblical scholars regard the requirement of Kohanim washing their hands before the Priestly Blessing as an example of the taboo against the profane making contact with the sacred, and similar practices are present in other religions of the period and region. The Jewish Encyclopedia relates that according to Herodotus the Egyptian priests were required to wash themselves twice a day and twice a night in cold water, and according to Hesiod the Greeks were forbidden from pouring out the black wine to any deity in the morning, unless they had first washed their hands.

According to the 1906 Jewish encyclopedia, The Letter of Aristeas states that creators of the Septuagint washed their hands in the sea each morning before prayer; Josephus states that this custom was the reason for the traditional location of synagogues near water. Biblical scholars regard this custom as an imitation by the laity of the behaviour of the priests. A baraita offers, as justification for the ritual of hand-washing after waking, the belief that a spirit of impurity rests upon each person during the night, and will not leave until the person's hands are washed, and the Zohar argues that body is open to demonic possession during sleep because the soul temporarily leaves the body during it; the kabbalah argues that death awaits anyone who walks more than four yards from their bed without ablution. According to, the cup containing the water has to be able to carry a certain amount of water, and it should have two handles.

According to Peake's commentary on the Bible, the Priestly Code specifies that individuals were washed before they could become members of the Jewish priesthood, and similarly requires Levites to be cleansed before they assume their work. Peake's commentary states that although Biblical rules regarding ritual purification following bodily discharges clearly have sanitary uses, they ultimately originated from the taboos against contact with blood and semen, due to the belief that these contained life, more than any other bodily fluid, or any other aspect of the body.

Rabbi Aryeh Kaplan in Waters of Life connects the laws of impurity to the narrative in the beginning of Genesis. According to Genesis, Adam and Eve had brought death into the world by eating from the Tree of Knowledge. Kaplan points out that most of the laws of impurity relate to some form of death (or in the case of niddah the loss of a potential life). One who comes into contact with one of the forms of death must then immerse in water which is described in Genesis as flowing out of the Garden of Eden (the source of life) in order to cleanse oneself of this contact with death (and by extension of sin).

== Mikveh in symbolic experience and biblical typology ==
Immersing in a mikveh can be a symbolic act connecting a person to ancestral experiences.

- Noah's Ark and the Flood
- Crossing the Red Sea
- The priests bearing the ark of the covenant lead the Israelites under Joshua across the Jordan River § Hebrew Bible

== See also ==
- Ablution (disambiguation)
- Ablution in Christianity
- Ghusl in Islam
- Handwashing in Judaism
- Mikveh
- Niddah
- Ritual purification
- Ritual washing in Mandaism
- Tevilat Keilim
- Tumah and taharah
- Wudu
