= Defilement =

Defilement may refer to:

- Injury to or loss of sanctity
- Kleshas (Buddhism), mental states that cloud the mind
- Tumah, the state of being ritually "impure" in Jewish law
