= Eight sheratzim =

Animals whose bodies convey impurity in Jewish law

In Judaism, the eight sheratzim (Hebrew שמונה שרצים), typically translated as the "eight creeping things", are animals described in Leviticus 11:29–30, which have special laws in regard to ritual impurity and Shabbat.

== Laws ==
While alive, the eight sheratzim do not convey impurity. However, when one of them has died and is touched or shifted by a human being, it conveys impurity to that person. If he were a priest (Kohen) of Aaron's lineage who touched the animal's corpse, he is forbidden to eat of the hallowed things until he first immerses his body in a mikveh and has waited until the sun has set. During the time when the laws of ritual purity were performed by the Jewish nation, earthenware vessels into which one of the eight, dead creeping things had fallen, including within an earthenware oven, become unclean and unfit for sacred foods, and, therefore, would be broken and the food discarded (Leviticus 11:33).

In other applications of Jewish law, a person who either catches or inflicts a wound upon one of the eight creeping things on the Sabbath day becomes culpable by that act, but is held unaccountable and exempt if he had inflicted a wound upon any of the other harmful vermin and creeping things.

The defilement associated with a 'creeping thing' has naught to do [with other things], except with eight [creeping things]. The creeping things in the Torah and, [particularly], what applies to them after their deaths, refer specifically to the ḥoled, and ʿaḫbar, and ṣav, and ʾanaqah, and koaḥ, and leṭaʾah, and ḥomeṭ, and tinšamet, but as for the remaining detestable things and those things that crawl which have died, even if they were of those things on the ground, such as frogs, and snakes, and scorpions, or of similar things, or of those things found at sea, even that which is called by one of these names, such as ʿaḫbar of the sea, they remain clean from any suspected defilement.

== Identification ==
Hebrew Word	Saadia Gaon (Judeo-Arabic)	Rashi (Old French)	Septuagint (Greek)
החֹלד (ha-ḥoled)	אלכׄלד; Mole (Spalax ehrenbergi)	mustele Weasel (Mustela spp.)	γαλἡ (gale); Weasel
העכבּר (ha-ʿaḫbar)	אלפאר; Mouse (Mus musculus)	xxx	μυς (mys); Mouse
הצב (ha-ṣav)	אלצׄב; Spiny-tailed lizard (Uromastyx aegyptius)	froit Toad (Bufo spp.)	κροκόδειλος (krokódeilos); Big lizard
האנקה (ha-anaqah)	אלורל; Monitor lizard (Varanus spp.)	heriçon Hedgehog (Erinaceus concolor)	μυγάλη (mygáli); Shrew (Crocidura spp.)
הכח (ha-koaḥ)	אלחרדׄון; Agama lizard (Agama spp.)	xxx	χαμαιλέων (chamailéon); Chameleon
הלטאה (ha-leṭa’ah)	אלעצׄאיה; Fringe-toed lizard (Acanthodactylus spp.) (Lacerta spp.)	laiserde Lizard (Lacerta spp.)	καλαβώτης (kalavótis); Newt
החמט (ha-ḥomeṭ)	אלחרבא; Chameleon lizard (Chamaeleo spp.)	limace Slug (Limax spp.)	σαύρα (sávra); Lizard
התנשמת (ha-tinšameṯ)	אלסמברץ; Gecko lizard (Hemidactylus turcicus)	talpe Mole (Talpa spp.)	ασπάλαξ (aspálax); Mole
