= Midras uncleanness =

Form of ritual impurity in Judaism

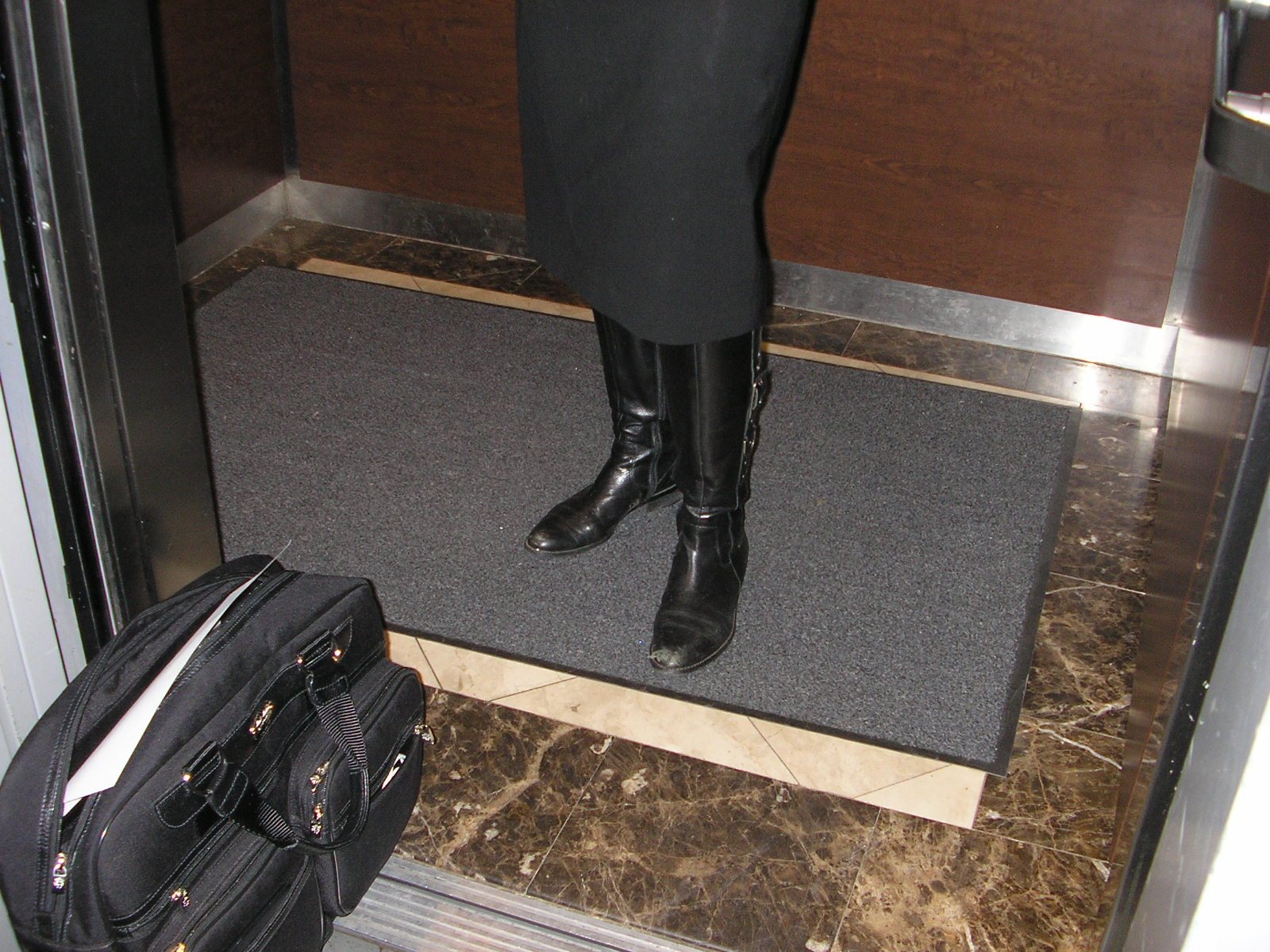
Woman in niddah state standing on elevator rug using her full body weight, thereby rendering the rug a "midras tmeiah" (unpure midras)

Midras uncleanness (Hebrew: טומאת מדרס) is one of the forms of ritual impurity in Judaism which can be transmitted by either an object or person. The term may be translated as pressure uncleanness.

A midras (lit. "trampled on" object) is an object that can be a carrier of ritual impurity. Common objects that could potentially become unclean, and become a such midras object, include a chair, sofa, mattress, and rug. A person who becomes unclean is categorized as a "father of uncleanliness".

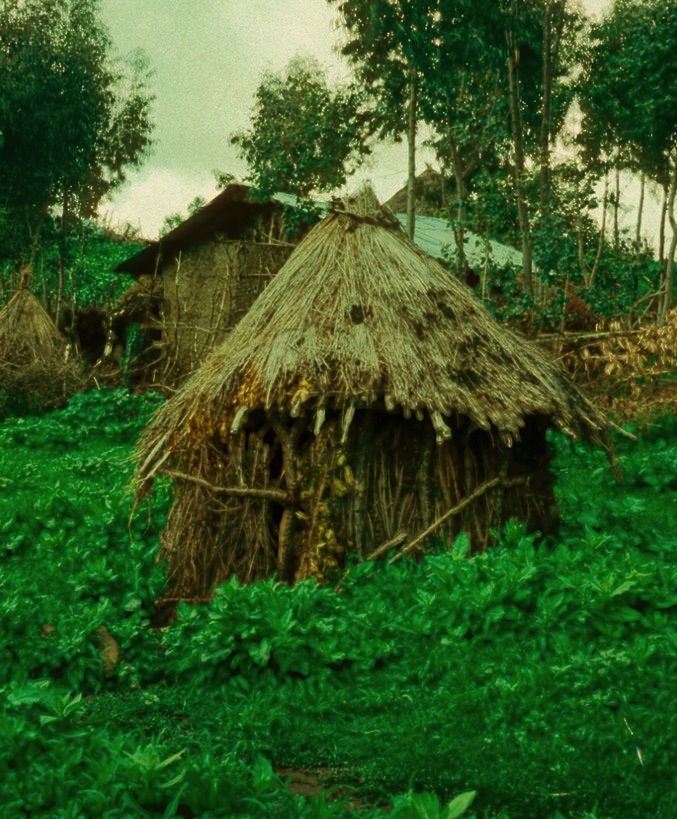
A niddah hut (Mergem Gogo) at the Jewish village of Ambober in northern Ethiopia, 1976. Beta Israeli women left their homes and stayed at the hut during menstruation, until they could immerse at the river and return home.

== Hebrew Bible ==
The general concept of a midras, an object becoming a carrier for uncleanliness, is brought in the book of Leviticus, though the following verse does not employ the Hebrew term midras;

Anyone who touches his bed must wash their clothes and bathe with water, and they will be unclean till evening.

— Leviticus 15:5, NIV

== Becoming unclean ==
According to Maimonides on Zavim 4:4, the midras object becomes unclean by a person who is a "father of uncleanliness" (such as a man with a seminal emission or a woman in the middle of menstruation) putting most of their body weight in one (or more) of five ways on the midras;

1. sitting on the midras like a chair
2. lying on the midras like a rug
3. leaning on the midras
4. standing on the midras like a mat
5. hanging from the midras

== Transmitting uncleanliness ==
Once the midras becomes unclean, it transmits uncleanliness to clean persons or objects by one of seven ways;

1. by touching the midras
2. by carrying the midras
3. by sitting on the midras
4. by lying on the midras
5. by leaning on the midras
6. by standing on the midras
7. by hanging from the midras

The person or object who becomes unclean via the midras is categorized as a Rishon L'Tumah.

== Purification ==
The purification of the midras object is accomplished by immersing the object in a mikveh bath (before sunset), and the subsequent elapse of sunset.

== Disqualified objects ==
Objects that are not subject to becoming unclean as midras include;

1. Unformed plates of terracotta,
2. Any object or vessel of stone,
3. Fabric or vessels made from fish (or any sea-life)
4. Objects or vessels affixed to the ground
