= Ablution =

Wikimedia broad-concept article

Ablution is the act of washing oneself. It may refer to:

- Ablution as hygiene
- Ablution as ritual purification
  - Ablution in Christianity
    - Baptism
    - Maundy (foot washing)
    - Cantharus (Christianity)
  - Ablution in Islam:
    - Wudu, daily wash
    - Ghusl, bathing ablution
    - Tayammum, waterless ablution
  - Ritual washing in Judaism
  - Ritual purification in Mandaeism
    - Rishama, daily ablution of face and limbs
    - Tamasha, full body purification
    - Masbuta, ritual immersion baptism purification
  - Misogi, in Shinto
- Absolution, the washing away of sin

== See also ==
- Oblation
- Ablation
