= Zav =

State of ritual impurity in Judaism

In Jewish ritual law, a zav (Hebrew: זָב; lit. "flowing") is a man who has had abnormal seminal discharge from the penis, and thus entered a state of ritual impurity. A woman who has had similar abnormal discharge from her genitals is known as a zavah.

Purification requirements for the zav include counting seven days without seminal discharge, immersion in a spring, and bringing certain korbanot (sacrifices). In the realm of tumah and taharah law, the zav can create a midras and is prohibited from entering specific areas of the Temple Mount.

The impurity of zav is unique in that it cannot be purified by immersion in a normal mikveh, but rather requires immersion in a spring of Living Water.

== Etymology ==
The form zav זָב is the present participle of the verb זוּב, thus literally meaning "flowing", and is commonly used in the Tanach when referring to bodily discharges originating from the private parts. By metonymy its meaning is extended to include people suffering from such discharges, and in this sense the word appears in halachic discourse.

== Hebrew Bible ==
The laws governing zav status appear in the book of Leviticus, introduced as follows:

Speak unto the children of Israel, and say unto them: When any man hath an issue out of his flesh, his issue is unclean. And this shall be his uncleanness in his issue: whether his flesh run with his issue, or his flesh be stopped from his issue, it is his uncleanness.

— Leviticus 15:2–3

This is followed by the laws relating to a zav: the impurity laws, the purification procedure when the flow has stopped, and the sacrifices to be offered after purification (Leviticus 15:4–15).

The similar laws of a zavah appear later in the same chapter (Leviticus 15:25–30). The commandment regarding niddah, found in the same chapter, uses the same Hebrew verb meaning "to flow", even though its laws are somewhat different from that of the zav or zavah (Leviticus 15:19).

In the second year after the Exodus from Egypt, when the Israelites were about to travel, they were commanded to send the zav outside the camp (Numbers 5:2).

== In rabbinical literature ==
The laws of the zav are first discussed in the Mishnah, tractate Zavim. A topic summary appears in Sefer Hachinuch, Mitzvah 178.

=== Discussion of the physical situation ===
The male zav's discharge is different from that of the female zavah: the zavah emits blood, while the zav emits a whitish fluid, which has a slight reddish tinge. According to Maimonides, the zav state is a disease of the male reproductive system while the man's general health remains normal, causing semen to ooze out without stimulation, erection, or pleasure; and to be discolored and have a thin consistency.

Based on Hebrew: החתים, lit. 'sealed', Abraham ibn Ezra mentions that zav status can also mean complete loss of ejaculation ability. Maimonides understands the same word as meaning even a minute amount of discharge that passes the exiting boundary of the male urinary tract.

=== Laws ===
If a man observes the abnormal discharge once, he becomes impure for a single day, like one who ejaculated normal semen. If he observes the discharge twice, the full seven-day period of impurity is required. If he observes it three times, he must also bring the specified sacrifice. These observations can occur on the same day, or on consecutive days. Only after the week's wait and immersion would he become ritually pure once more (Leviticus 15:25), but he would not be permitted to eat terumah nor to eat the flesh of a sacrifice until after bringing his sacrifice until nightfall of the eighth day.

The zav is quantified as an Av HaTumah, something able to transfer uncleanliness. In addition, his actual zav discharge, saliva, semen, and urine are also deemed to have Av HaTumah status.

Regarding the transportability of tumah from the zav, the Mishnah records that if a ritually clean person and a zav both sat on an animal, or in a small boat, then the ritually clean person would become ritually unclean by doing so, regardless of how far apart they might sit. This is known as hesset ("minor movement").

Regular ejaculation is treated as being distinct from zav, and is known as keri (קֶרִי) (Leviticus 15:16–18).

=== Viewed as Divine punishment ===
Ibn Ezra notes that the Torah requirement of bringing a sin-offering upon the completion of seven clean days is an indication that the zav committed a sinful act that incurred his zav status. Similarly, Hezekiah ben Manoah writes that the textual order of the zav laws near those of tzaraath and embezzlement (me'ilah), and demonstrate that zav status is incurred by lack of earnestness (to God) and sin.

Shabbatai HaKohen commented that zav status is a divine consequence for excessive indulgence in physical relations in the laying position. Thus, as a consequence, items the zav will lay upon (i.e. midras objects) will become tamei (impure) for the duration of his zav state.

== In modern Judaism ==
The laws of zav have little relevance nowadays, as a state of purity is only required for activities such as entering the Temple and eating terumah - activities which are not practiced nowadays.

A zav would be prohibited from visiting the Temple Mount nowadays without undergoing the purification procedure.

== See also ==
- Zavah
