= Tevilat Kelim =

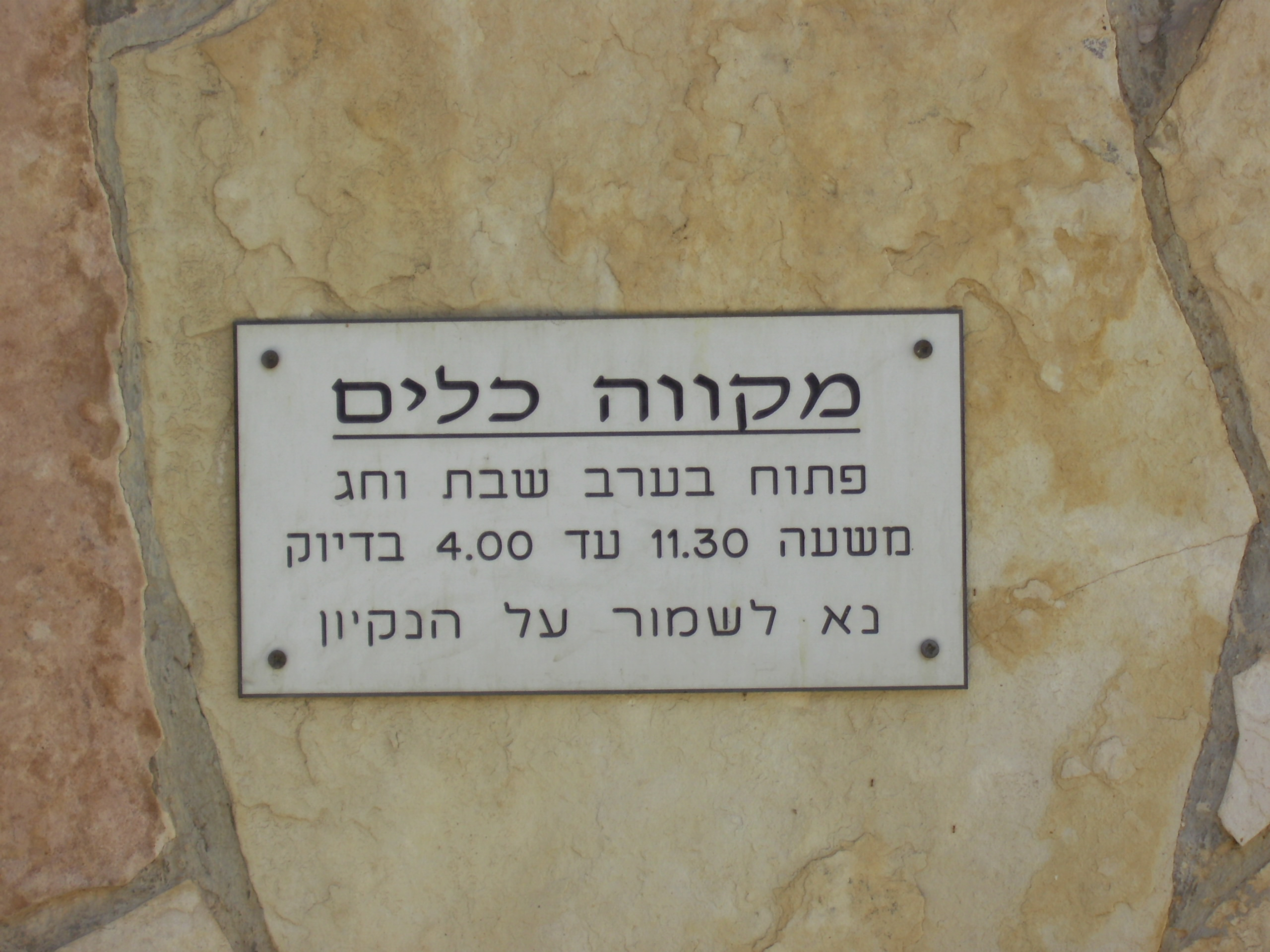
Utensils Mikva, Jerusalem

Tevilat Kelim (Hebrew: טבילת כלים, lit. 'immersion of vessels'), in Judaism, is the immersion of certain types of culinary utensils in a mikveh, on the occasion of their being acquired from a non-Jew.

== Source ==
It is based upon Numbers 31:22–23: "Howbeit the gold, and the silver, the brass, the iron, the tin, and the lead, every thing that may abide the fire, ye shall make to go through the fire, and it shall be clean; nevertheless it shall be purified with the water of sprinkling; and all that abideth not the fire ye shall make to go through the water."

== Laws ==
The obligation to immerse metal utensils acquired from a non-Jew is Biblical based on the above verse, whereas the obligation to immerse glass utensils is Rabbinic. Halachic authorities dispute the status of plastic utensils: some say that they need not be immersed, and others say that they should be immersed without a blessing.
