= Impurity after childbirth =

Social or religious concept

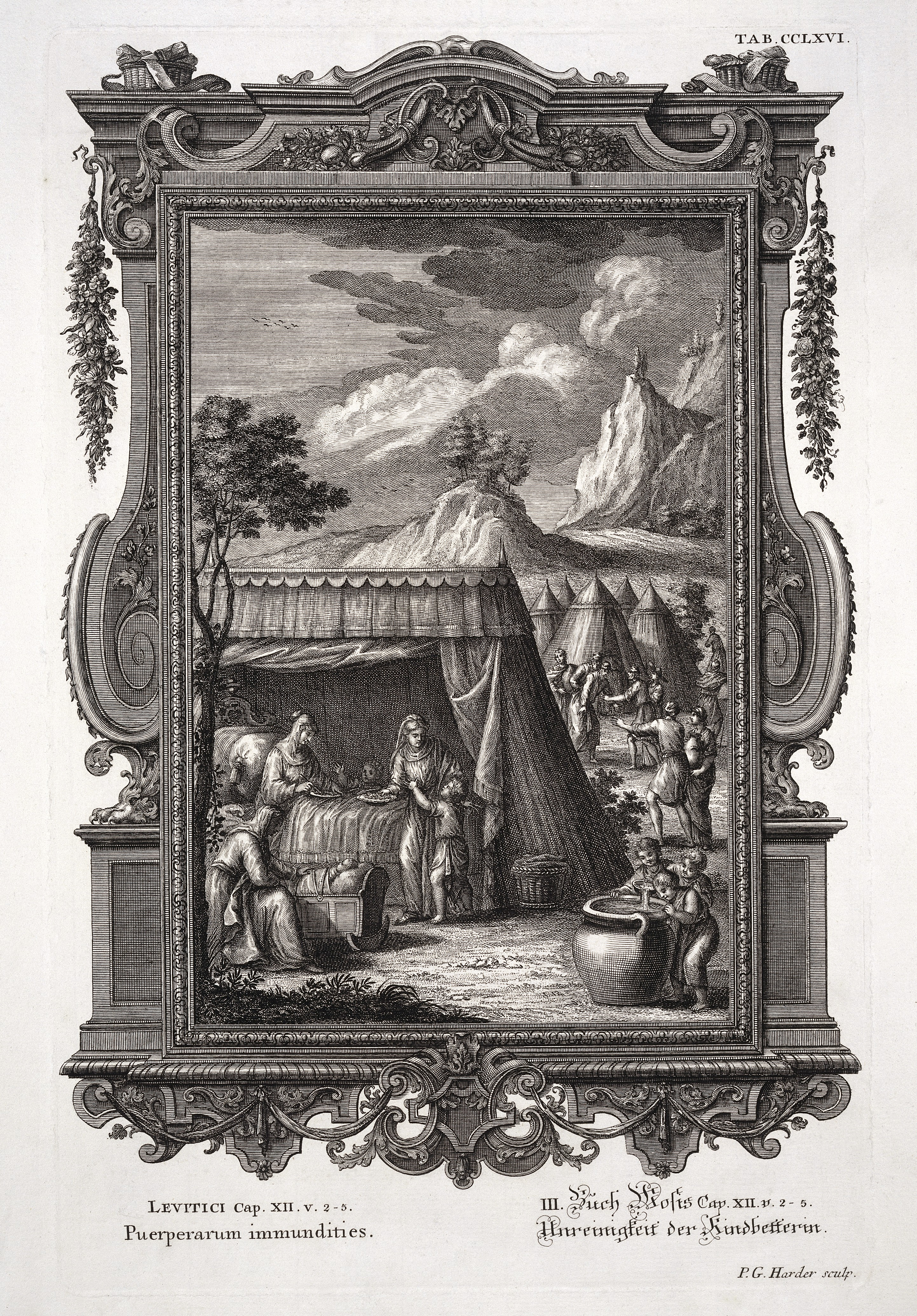
Etching (Germany, c. 1731) illustrating the uncleanliness of the mother after giving birth, according to Jewish law. The Book of Leviticus states that a mother should be considered unclean for 40 days after giving birth to a boy and for 80 days after giving birth to a girl. The scene shows a mother in bed eating, surrounded by women and children. Her baby is rocked in a crib. In the foreground, three children ladle water from a jar. In the background is a tented community.

Impurity after childbirth is the concept in many cultures and religions that a new mother is in a state of uncleanliness for a period of time after childbirth, requiring ritual purification. Practices vary, but typically there are limits around what she can touch, who she can interact with, where she can go, and what tasks she can do. Some practices related to impurity after childbirth, such as seclusion, overlap with the more general practice of postpartum confinement.

== Practices by culture ==
=== Ancient Greece ===
The Ancient Greek philosopher Theophrastus compared the impurity of childbirth to the impurity of death. The entire household, all those who assisted at the birth, and the new baby incurred this impurity; this most likely ended with the ritual washing of hands at the amphidromia, five to seven days later. The mother's purification may also have occurred then, or she may have remained heavily polluted until the dekate, ten days after giving birth. A period of lighter pollution followed, during which the new mother remained confined to her home and was especially banned from entering sacred spaces. After forty days, she left her home, made a sacrifice to the gods (possibly a dog to Hekate), and was considered clean again.

=== Ancient Rome ===
Not much is known about postpartum impurity in Ancient Rome. Festus, in his De verborum significatione, describes a ritual purification of newborn girls on the eighth day after birth and boys on the ninth day. Augustine of Hippo mentions a tradition of sweeping the threshold after a birth, a purification rite also practiced by the Romans after a death in the household. Along with customs such as decorating the door with laurel branches and lighting a candle to Candelifera, these purification rites may have indicated a belief in postpartum impurity. However, such impurity does not seem to have extended to the household as a whole: the father of a newborn could enter temples, and visitors were welcomed after a birth.

=== Hinduism ===
In traditional Hindu practice, a woman who is in labor or has recently given birth (a jachcha) is considered impure, a state called sutak. Based on passages from the Aitareya Brahmana, anthropologist Gabriella Eichinger Ferro-Luzzi infers that this practice dates back to the Vedic era. Pandurang Vaman Kane theorizes that it most likely originated with the indigenous Harappan culture, rather than with the arrival of Indo-Aryans. Like many Hindu purity practices, the impurity after childbirth has been decreasingly observed since the 19th century; many modern Hindus observe a shortened period of impurity, welcome visitors after the birth of a child, and are willing to touch the new mother and baby.

Traditionally, the puerperal impurity is attributed to nine months of menstrual blood accumulated during the pregnancy, and thought to be more severe than even the impurity associated with death. Women are therefore expected to give birth in a secluded location, in order to confine the impurity. Depending on the local tradition and the family's resources, this may be a dedicated hut (atur-ghar or sutikagara), a repurposed shed or outhouse, or simply an unused room of the house. The traditional midwife (dai), often belonging to the dalit caste, is considered impure by association. She is especially responsible for those tasks which are considered impure, such as cutting the umbilical cord, touching the genitals of the woman in labor, and bathing the mother and child.

The new mother remains heavily impure for three days after the birth. During this Sor period, she remains secluded from the family, attended by the dai. The new baby's father and his household are also considered impure during this period, regardless of where the birth occurred. The newborn may be considered to share the mother's state of heavy impurity, or to be too young to be impure. On the third day, the jai bathes and anoints the mother and child, bringing them to a state of lesser impurity. The mother's bangles and all the clay pots in the household are broken; the clothes worn during labor, the bedding, and the receiving blanket are disposed of; dirt floors are refinished; and the tool used to cut the umbilical cord is purified. Other members of the household also bathe, returning them to a state of purity.

After the end of the Sor period, the new mother can rejoin her household, but remains in her state of lesser impurity for about forty days after the birth. She traditionally remains confined to the house for this period, and while she may resume many of her ordinary household tasks, she continues to avoid cooking, grinding flour, and touching water. She may be expected to avoid various foods, such as buttermilk and curds. Another woman may share her bed in order to ensure that the husband does not engage in sexual intercourse with the new mother, which is held to be harmful to him. Due to the continued impurity, the household does not accept visitors during this period; hijras, however, are welcomed, and may be paid to bless the new baby. All members of the household avoid temples and auspicious events, and the new mother may not engage in worship or touch holy images.

The exact span of the period of lesser impurity varies according to local custom; it may depend on the sex of the infant or the caste of the mother, or the end date may be set by a Brahmin. Towards the end of this time, the new mother may participate in a ritual touching of earthenware, marking the point at which she is allowed to handle pots and enter the kitchen. At the end of the period of impurity, the woman bathes, her clothes and bedding are washed, and some women engage in a "well worship" (Daghar Puja) ritual. After this, she and her household are considered clean, and can return to their normal activities.

=== Papua New Guinea ===
Many indigenous people of New Guinea observe various forms of postpartum impurity, although some anthropologists argue that this is best understood, not as pollution, but as a dangerous proximity to the sacred. Women in these tribes typically give birth in dedicated huts at some distance from the village, alone or with female attendants; lochia, like menstrual blood, is thought to be dangerous to men.

The Kaulong, along with the nearby Sengseng, observe some of the most intense known practices regarding female impurity. Among these practices is the belief that, during childbirth, women spread pollution horizontally in all directions. Kaulong women therefore give birth in a remote location wearing disposable clothing, which they destroy before returning to the village. Similar practices are observed among peoples including the Murik, the Gadsup, the Mae Enga, and the Wogeo.

=== Tanzania ===
In Tanzania, Bena women are considered impure after childbirth, and for this reason commonly delay breastfeeding for one to two days until uterine involution occurs. The new mother remains secluded afterwards for up to three months, usually in a dedicated room of the house, and avoids cooking or serving food. During this period, she bathes and washes her clothes frequently, and other people avoid contact with her and her children. Kumlehedzya umwana, the cleansing ritual which marks the end of the period of seclusion, involves traditional herbs (mugoda or mafikho) given to all members of the household.

Among the Swahili people of Pemba Island, women are considered impure until the discharge of lochia ends, usually about 40 days after birth. During this period, the new mother is expected to remain secluded and avoid praying, preparing food, and having sex or sharing a bed with her husband. Especially for a first birth, a Swahili woman often observes this period of seclusion at her parents' house. A special diet is prescribed for her, including some foods (special teas, octopus, squid, wrasse, cassava, chicken, rice, and cornmeal) and excluding others (eel, mandazi, meat, beans, and bananas). After her bleeding stops, she cleanses herself with a ritual bath of herb-infused water.

== Jewish and Christian practices ==
=== Biblical law on impurity after childbirth ===
According to Leviticus 12, a woman who gives birth to a son remains impure for a week, and afterwards immerses in a body of water to purify herself. In the rabbinical interpretation of Leviticus 12, any subsequent blood she sees over the next 33 days would be considered dam tohar (דַּם טׂוהַר – ritually clean blood), and that blood does not prohibit her from sexual relations with her husband. The law for a woman who gives birth to a daughter is the same, however, the durations are doubled. The mother becomes impure for 2 weeks, and after immersion, any blood she sees over the next 66 days is dam tohar.

There is no scholarly consensus for the Biblical law, including the difference between the birth of sons and daughters. Tikva Frymer-Kensky suggested that "like the person who touched death, the person who has experienced birth has been at the boundaries of life/non-life...."

Other rationales include moments of crisis or danger, fear of demons, health, and a lack of wholeness.

=== Jewish law and practices ===
Within the realm of Biblical law and post-Biblical Jewish religious discourse surrounding tumah and taharah, the impurity is called in Hebrew tumat yoledet. Halakhah treats a yoledet (woman who gives birth) similarly to any woman with niddah status.

In some Jewish communities, ceremonies and a degree of seclusion were applied to postparturient women. For example, there was a Sana Yemenite custom of women visiting the mother during 4–6 weeks after childbirth. The mother would be visited in a special room in her home and she would sit in a decorated triangle box.

=== Christian practices ===
Some early churches followed the Jewish custom of restricting women from worship after giving birth until the purification ceremony. Today, many Christians commemorate Candlemas, the feast of the purification of the Virgin Mary. Some continue to celebrate a Churching of Women ceremony, derived from the Jewish tradition but not necessarily implicating ritual impurity.

== See also ==
- Menstrual taboo
- Postpartum depression
