= Tumah and taharah =

State of being ritually impure or pure in Judaism

In Jewish religious law, there is a category of specific Jewish purity laws, defining what is ritually impure or pure: ṭum'ah (Hebrew: טומאה, pronounced [tumˈʔa]) and ṭaharah (Hebrew: טהרה, pronounced [tahaˈra]) are the state of being ritually "impure" and "pure", respectively. The Hebrew noun ṭum'ah, meaning "impurity", describes a state of ritual impurity. A person or object which contracts ṭum'ah is said to be ṭamé (טמא Hebrew adjective, "ritually impure"), and thereby unsuited for certain holy activities and uses (kedushah, קְדֻשָּׁה in Hebrew) until undergoing predefined purification actions that usually include the elapse of a specified time period.

The contrasting Hebrew noun ṭaharah (טָהֳרָה) describes a state of ritual purity that qualifies the ṭahor (טָהוֹר; ritually pure person or object) to be used for kedushah. The most common method of achieving ṭaharah is by the person or object being immersed in a mikveh (ritual bath). This concept is connected with ritual washing in Judaism, and both ritually impure and ritually pure states have parallels in ritual purification in other world religions.

The laws of ṭum'ah and ṭaharah were generally followed by the Israelites and post-exilic Jews, particularly during the First and Second Temple periods, and to a limited extent are a part of applicable halakha in modern times. Recent scholarship has offered several interpretations of biblical impurity. Jacob Milgrom argued that ritual impurity is fundamentally associated with death and mortality, while moral impurity results from grave sins and defiles the sanctuary and the land.

== Research and interpretation ==
Mary Douglas interpreted the purity laws as expressions of symbolic order, arguing that impurity represents violations of cultural categories and boundaries.

Tikva Frymer-Kensky argued that the biblical impurity system is not uniform and that different forms of impurity reflect distinct conceptual frameworks.

Jonathan Klawans distinguished between ritual impurity, arising from natural conditions such as childbirth, menstruation, and contact with corpses, and moral impurity, which results from severe transgressions including idolatry, sexual offenses, and bloodshed.

Yitzhaq Feder proposed that biblical impurity is best understood through several distinct cognitive models rather than a single concept, including contagion, disgust, and transgression.

Building on these approaches, David Bar-Cohn argues that priestly purification rituals serve a dual function. In addition to removing impurity associated with death, they also restore vitality through what he terms "replenishment." According to Bar-Cohn, purification rituals should therefore be understood not only as rites of purgation but also as rites that symbolically renew life and restore the vitality of both the individual and the sanctuary.

Rabbi Leib Mintzberg distinguished corpse impurity from other forms of ritual impurity. In his view, most impurities symbolize defilement or uncleanness and are removed through immersion, which symbolizes cleansing and renewal. Corpse impurity, however, reflects the existential encounter with death, divine judgment, and separation from God rather than mere uncleanness. Accordingly, its purification requires the sprinkling of the waters of purification rather than immersion alone. Mintzberg further argues that the rites of purification are symbolic acts established by divine decree, intended to produce spiritual and psychological transformation rather than physical change.

== Etymology ==
The Hebrew noun ṭum'ah (טֻמְאָה) derives from the verb ṭamé (טָמֵא), in the qal form of the verb "to become impure"; in the niphal to "defile oneself"; and in the transitive Piel to defile something or pronounce something impure. The verb stem has a corresponding adjective, ṭamé (טָמֵא), "impure". Likewise the Hebrew noun ṭahara (טָהֳרָה) is also derived from a verb, in this case ṭaher (טָהֵר) "to be ritually pure". and in the transitive piel "to purify". The verb and noun have a corresponding adjective, ṭahor (טָהוֹר), "ritually pure". The word is a cognate to the Arabic word 'طهارة' ṭahāra(h) (pronounced almost identically, with the elongation of the second 'a') which has the same meaning in Islam.

Some sources, such as Samson Raphael Hirsch on Genesis 7:2, claim that the meaning is "entombed", meaning the person or item that is in the tame state is blocked, and not in a state of receiving holy transmission. Ṭahor, by contrast, is defined as "pure" in the sense that the person or object is in a clear state and can/may potentially serve as a conduit for Divine and Godly manifestation. Although ṭum'ah and ṭaharah is sometimes translated as unclean and clean, it is more a spiritual state than a physical one. Once initiated (for the physical signs that initiate tzaraath, zav and niddah, see below) it is generally immeasurable and unquantifiable by known mechanical detection methods, there is no measure of filth, unsanitary, or odorous affiliation with the state of ṭum'ah, nor any mechanically measurable level of cleanliness, clarity, or physical purity for the state of ṭaharah.

== In the Bible ==
=== Usage ===
The noun form of ṭum'ah is used around 40 times in the Masoretic Text of the Hebrew Bible and is generally translated as "uncleanness" in English language Bibles such as the King James Version and the New Jewish Publication Society of America Tanakh. The majority of uses are in Leviticus. Though uses for national impurity occur in Ezra and Ezekiel, and Zechariah prophesies the removal of the "prophets and spirit of impurity (רוּחַ הַטֻּמְאָה) from the land", the adjective tamei (טָמֵא, "impure") is much more common. The verb form of ṭaharah (טָהֳרָה), the verb ṭaher (טָהֵר) "be pure", is used first in the Hebrew Bible is in Genesis 35:2, where Jacob tells his family to "put away strange gods, and be pure".

In general, the term tum'ah is used in two distinct ways in the Hebrew Bible:

- Ritual impurity – the opposite of taharah ("purity"), also known as "impurity of the body".
- Moral impurity – the opposite of kedushah ("sanctity"), also known as "impurity of the soul"; this category also includes activities which are disgusting or abominable.

In general, tum'ah in the sense of "ritual impurity" is prefixed by the letter lamed or lacks any prefix at all, while tum'ah in the sense of "moral impurity" is prefixed by the letter bet.

=== Ritual impurity ===
==== Activities which create impurity ====
The Torah, particularly the book of Leviticus, lists various activities which create an "impure" (tamei) status:

- A person who touches a corpse.
- A person who touches something that has been made impure by a corpse.
- A person who touches or carries carrion.
- A person who touches or shifts the carcass of one of the eight sheratzim (creeping animals); also a vessel or clay oven upon which falls one of these carcasses.
- A woman, upon giving birth, becomes impure for 7 days for a son or 14 days for a daughter.
- A person who has been diagnosed with tzaraath.
- A house and its contents which have been diagnosed with tzaraath.
- A man or woman with an unnatural emission from the genitals (zav/zavah), or a menstruating woman (niddah). A person who touches them, or who touches their chair, or vessels that they touch, is also impure.
- A man who has had a seminal discharge, or a garment touched by semen.
- A person who eats meat of animals that have died of themselves or been killed by beasts.
- A priest who performs certain roles in the red heifer sacrifice.
- If a corpse is present in a house, people and objects within the house become impure.

Some of these activities are forbidden (i.e. eating non-kosher meat), others are permitted (i.e. sex between a married couple), and others are unavoidable (i.e. if a person dies suddenly while other people are in the house). Thus, there is no automatic moral stigma to becoming "impure"; impurity "comes to everyone universally and without exception by virtue of biological existence".

==== Implications of impure status ====
Certain activities are prohibited as a result of acquiring this "impure" status. For example:

- Before the giving of the Ten Commandments, the people were warned not to approach their wives (presumably due to semen causing impurity).
- One who is impure due to tzaraat, genital emissions, or touching a corpse, had to live outside the desert encampment.
- Priests could only eat sacrificial meat while pure.
- One who is impure due to a corpse could not visit the sanctuary without making it spiritually impure, which is a crime punished by karet.

Just as it is a severe offense to bring impurity into the Israelite sanctuary, "impurity" is also seen as a means of nullifying a worship site of other religions; though the rules for this impurity are not made clear.

==== Purification ====
Different forms of impurity requires various rituals in order to regain a "pure" (tahor) status. For example:

- Impurity due to seminal emission can be purified by immersing in a ritual bath after the next nightfall.
- Impurity due to tzaraat requires waiting seven days, shaving one's hair, washing one's clothes, immersing one's body, and offering a Temple sacrifice to achieve purification.
- Impurity from touching a corpse requires a special red heifer sacrifice and ritual to achieve purification.

=== Moral impurity ===
The term tumah is also used to refer to certain sins, for which there is no specific ritual to remove the impure status. For example:

- Sexual sins such as incest, adultery, rape, bestiality
- Consulting the Ov or Yidoni
- Delivering one's child to Moloch
- Murder/manslaughter
- Leaving a hanged criminal's corpse on the scaffold overnight
- Idolatry
- According to Rabbi Malbim, the laws of kashrut fall in this category.

In a number of cases, no specific sin is mentioned; overall sinful behavior has led to impurity. Christine Hayes argues that moral impurity is the reason for the gentile expulsion and alienation that occurs in Ezra–Nehemiah. However, S.M. Olyan argues that this expulsion was inspired by earlier biblical traditions regarding both ritual and moral impurity.

== In rabbinic literature ==
The Mishnah devotes one of its six subdivisions, named Tohorot ("purities"), to the laws of ritual impurity. Neither the Babylonian nor the Jerusalem Talmud contains systematic commentaries to the tractates of Tohorot (except for niddah which is an integral part of Babylonian and Jerusalem Talmud as well), as these laws had little practical relevance after the destruction of the Temple. However, the laws are discussed many times in other tractates, and in later rabbinic literature.

Maimonides clarifies that, in addition to all of Israel, the priests are expected to be knowledgeable and fluent in the general and specifics of ṭumah and ṭaharah law. Given his role of Temple service and year round consumption of terumah, each priest was required to be in a ṭahor state.

=== Mandatory or optional ===
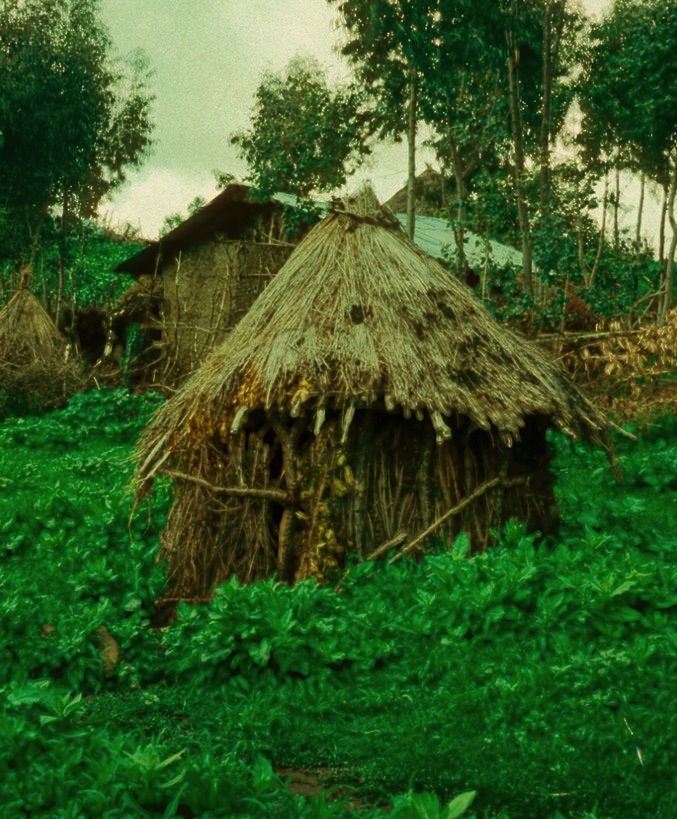
A niddah hut (mergem gogo) at the Jewish village of Ambober in northern Ethiopia, 1976.

The mainstream view among rishonim (leading 11th-15th-century legal authorities) and non-Kabbalistic authorities is that one is permitted to become tamei (except on those occasions when one must visit the Temple, or touch holy objects), and thus there is no obligation to attempt to remain tahor. As an example, it is not only permitted but a mitzvah to tend to a dead person, even though this causes impurity. However, some rabbis have advocated keeping some of the laws of purity even in the absence of the temple in Jerusalem and even in the diaspora.

One category that was commonly kept in Talmudic and pre-Talmudic times is ṭumath ochlin v'mashkin (consuming food and drink that did not become ṭamei). Sages such as Rabban Gamaliel and Hiyya the Great encouraged eating only pure food at all times. Targum Yonathan considered this to be implicit in Exodus 22:30. One who kept this stringency was called a porush, meaning "separated" (from ṭumah). This was also one of the criteria for being a haver (a "friend" or "fellow" with whom the rabbis could eat without risk of violating purity laws), and according to some, the main criterion. Additionally, some rabbis advocated abstaining from the midras of a niddah. Rabbi Menachem Schneerson discouraged abstaining from any object made impure by a menstruating woman in modern times, with the exception for unique individuals.

=== Hierarchy of impurity ===
The rabbis describe a hierarchy of levels of impurity. In general, each level can result from touch by the level above it. The levels are:

- Avi avot hatumah (grandfather of impurity) - a human corpse
- Av HaTumah (father of impurity) - Maimonides enumerates 11 objects which have this status:
  - Tameh met - a living person who has touched a corpse
  - Tumat sheretz - the dead body of a swarming animal (sheretz) listed in Leviticus 11:29–30
  - Tumat nevelah - the body of a land animal which died without ritual slaughter; the body of a non-kosher land animal which died in any manner; a kosher bird which died without ritual slaughter receives this status in relation to its consumption but not its touch
  - Shichvat zera - human semen which has left the body
  - Mei hatat - water into which ashes of the red heifer were mixed
  - People who were involved in the red heifer procedure and in certain procedures of the Yom Kippur sacrifices
  - Niddah - a menstruant woman; a man who has had sex with such a woman; the woman's blood, spit, and urine; objects which she has sat, reclined, or rode upon
  - Yoledet - a woman in the period after she gives birth; the same related categories as with niddah
  - Zavah - a woman with abnormal genital discharge; the same related categories as with niddah
  - Zav - a man with abnormal genital discharge; his spit, urine, semen, and discharge; objects which he sat or rode [or reclined??] upon
  - Metzora - a person who has contracted tzaraat, and in the purification period after recovery; a garment or house infected by tzaraat
  - Subsidiary types of Av Hatumah include:
    - A person who had relations with a niddah, zavah, or yoledet
    - A utensil designed for sitting which was sat on by a niddah, yoledet, zavah, zav (and possibly metzora)
    - Liquids expelled from inside the body (e. g., spit, blood, but not sweat) of a niddah, yoledet, zavah, zav (and possibly metzora)
  - In addition, the rabbis declared several rabbinic categories of av hatumah.
- Rishon letumah (first level of impurity) or vlad hatumah (child of impurity) - a person, vessels, food, or drink which have touched an av hatumah,
- Sheni letumah (second level of impurity):
  - Food or drink which has touched a rishon letumah
  - A person's hands are always considered sheni letumah, until he or she has done netilat yadayim.
- Shlishi letumah (third level of impurity) - sanctified goods which have touched sheni letumah
- Revii letumah (fourth level of impurity) - sanctified goods which have touched shlishi letumah
- Hamishi letumah (fifth level of impurity) - According to Maimonides this status does not exist, and revii letumah cannot impurify other objects. However, some sources suggest that this status might exist. In addition, red heifer waters can have a status similar to this.

=== Impurity of scrolls ===
The rabbis declared Torah scrolls to be impure by rabbinic law. This seemingly strange law had a practical purpose: it discouraged Jews from storing their terumah produce alongside Torah scrolls, which attracted mice and caused the Torah scrolls to be nibbled on as well.

=== In modern times ===
Following the destruction of the Second Temple, ritual impurity status ceased to have practical consequences, with the exception of niddah and zav/zavah, and rules forbidding making a Kohen impure. These rules are still practiced in Orthodox Judaism.

In Conservative Judaism, while the concept of niddah and a prohibition on sexual relations during the niddah period (including childbirth) are still agreed upon, recent decisions by the Committee on Jewish Law and Standards have endorsed multiple views about the concept of zavah, as well as the tumah status of a niddah. The liberal view held that the concepts of ṭumah and ṭaharah are not relevant outside the context of a Holy Temple (as distinct from a synagogue; hence a niddah cannot convey ṭumah today), found the concept of zavah no longer applicable, and permitted spouses to touch each other in a manner similar to siblings during the niddah period (while retaining a prohibition on sexual conduct). The traditional view retained the applicability of the concepts of tumah, ṭaharah, and zavah, and retained a prohibition on all contact.

== History and archaeology ==
Both the use of stone vessels and of ritual baths (mikvehs) are specific answers to Jewish preoccupation with ritual purity from the Second Temple period.

There are no existing written records or archaeological evidence of specific Jewish ritual cleansing installations prior to the first century BCE.

== See also ==
- Kashrut – dietary laws of purity in Judaism.
- Bereavement in Judaism§Preparing the body – taharah
- Taharah (Islam), Arabic word for the same concept in Islam
- Kegare, Japanese for state of pollution and defilement
