= Mikveh =

Jewish ritual bath

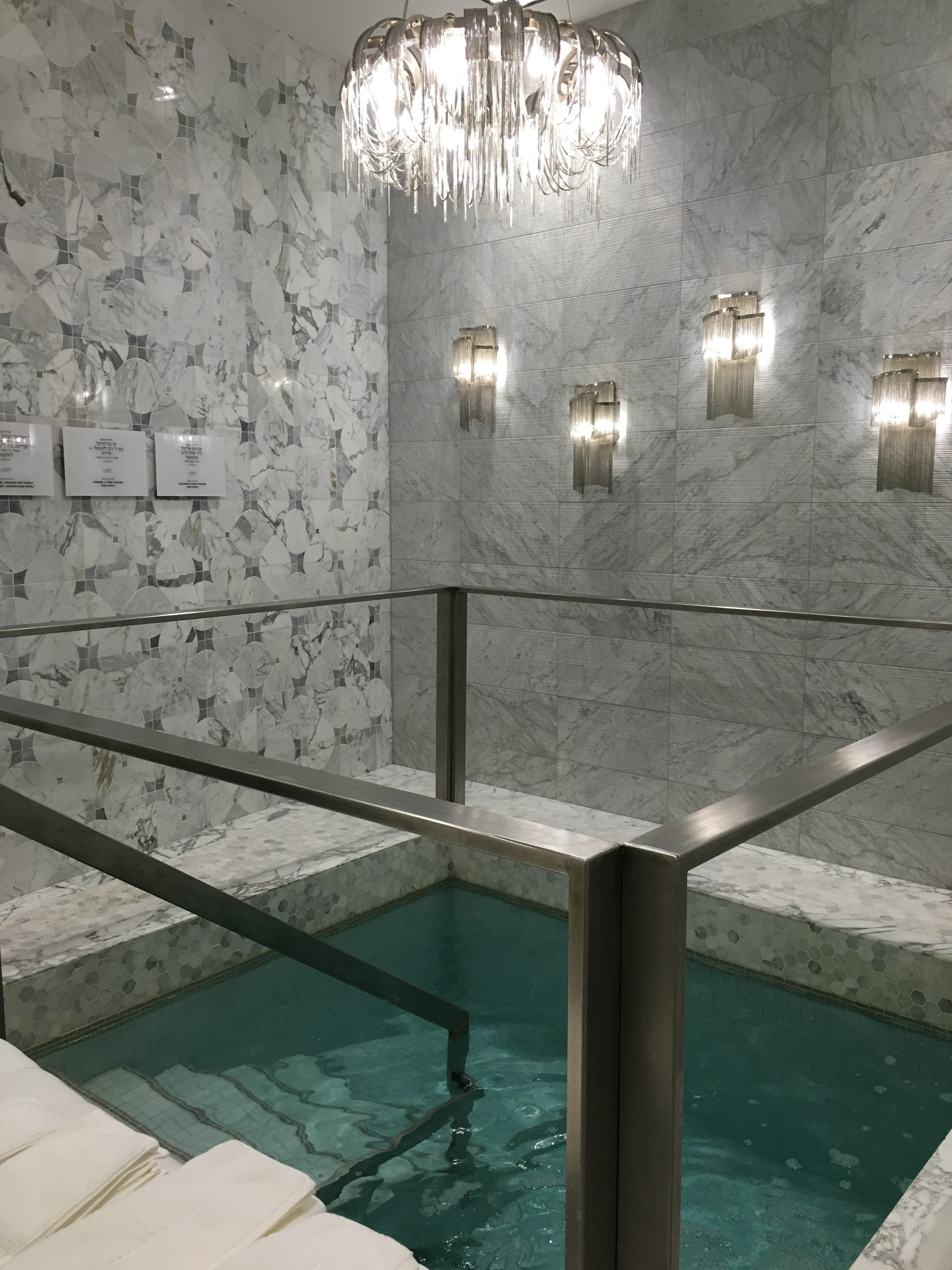
Mikvah Mei Chaya Mushka in Crown Heights, Brooklyn

A mikveh (pronounced [/ˈmik.ve/]; Hebrew: מִקְוֶא, romanized: miqveʾ, lit. 'a gathering [of water]'; pl. mikve'ot or mikvot (Note: Mikves, in Ashkenazi Hebrew)) or mikvah (IPA: [/miqˈwaː/]) is a bath used during ritual immersion in Judaism to achieve ritual purity.

In Orthodox Judaism, these regulations are steadfastly adhered to; consequently, the mikveh is central to an Orthodox Jewish community. Conservative Judaism also formally holds to the regulations. The existence of a mikveh is considered so important that, according to Halakha, a Jewish community is required to construct a kosher mikveh even before building a synagogue, and must go to the extreme of selling Torah scrolls, or even a synagogue if necessary, to provide funding for its construction.

== Etymology ==
Formed from the Semitic root ק-ו-ה (q-w-h, 'collect'). In the Hebrew Bible, the word is employed in the sense of "collection", including in the phrase "וּלְמִקְוֵה הַמַּיִם" (ū·l·miqwê ha·m·má·yim, lit. 'And to the gathering of the waters') in Genesis 1:10, as well as in similar usages in Exodus 7:19, and Leviticus 1. Ben Sira, in the Jewish apocryphal Book of Sirach 10:13 (and at other points in the text), is the earliest author to use "מִקְוֶה" as a word for "pool", and the Mishnah is the earliest source to use it in the sense of "ritual bath".

== History ==
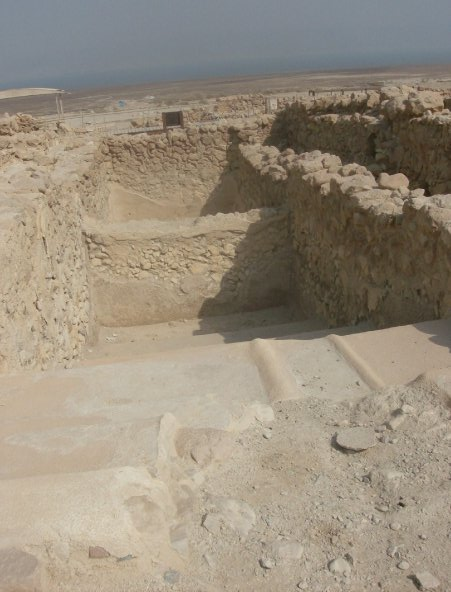
Excavated mikveh in Qumran

No written records or archaeological evidence of specific Jewish ritual cleansing installations have been found from prior to the first century BCE. Mikvot first appear in the historical record in that century, and from that time, ancient mikvot are found across the Land of Israel and in historic Jewish communities worldwide. Hundreds of mikvot from the Second Temple period have been discovered so far across the Land of Israel, including in Jerusalem, Hebron, Masada, and Hannaton.

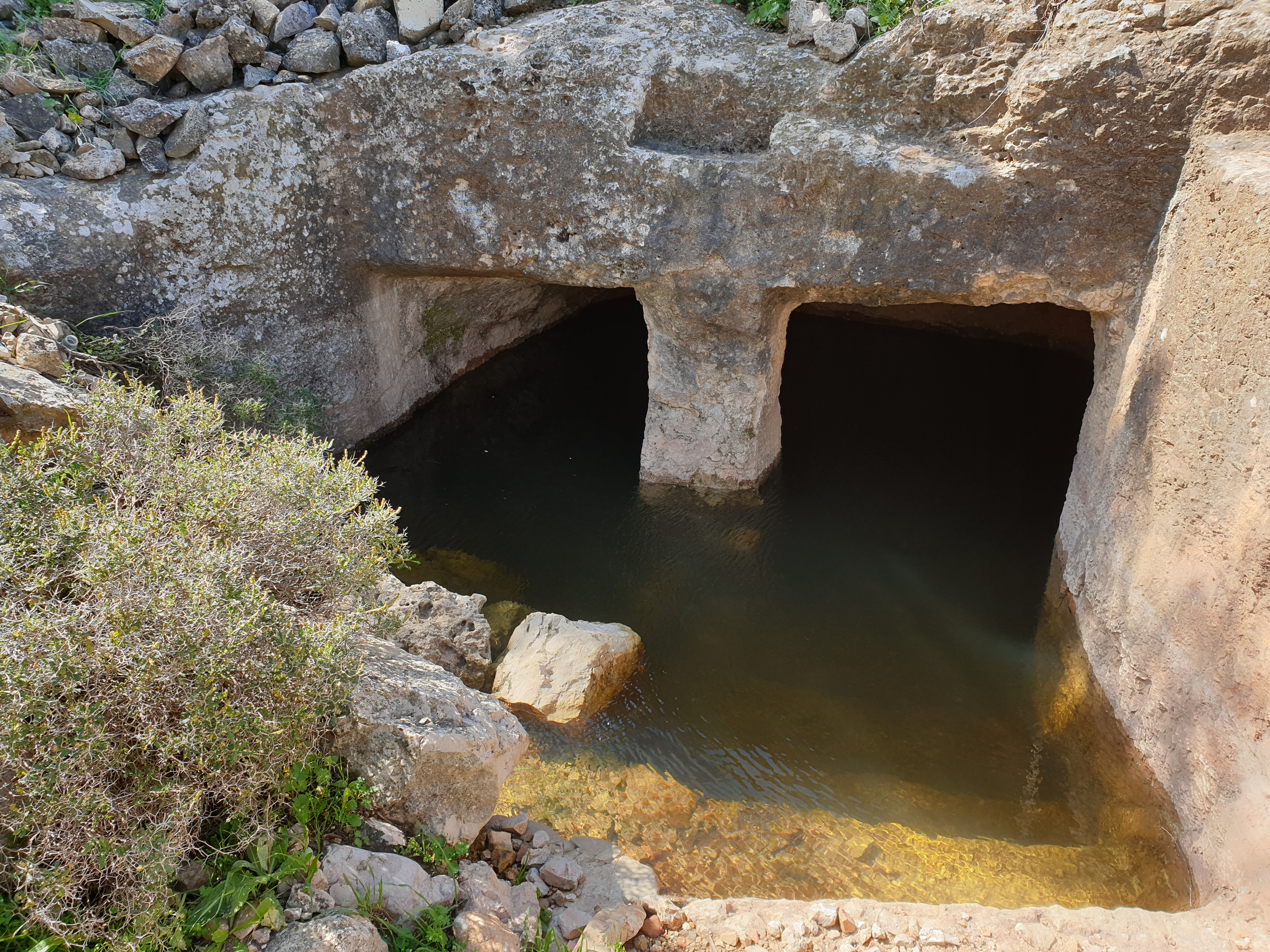
A two-chambered mikveh at Bir ed-Duwali, a Jewish village in Judea destroyed during the First Jewish–Roman War

The lack of dedicated mikvot before the first century BCE is notable, especially since many early Jews did follow purification laws, as shown by the accounts recorded in 1 Samuel 20:26 and 21:5; 2 Samuel 11:4; and 2 Chronicles 30:15 and 30:24, as well as the Elephantine papyri and ostraca. One suggestion is that Jews used natural water sources such as springs for immersion, rather than building dedicated mikvot. Alternatively, according to many Halakhic authorities, the prohibition on using pumped water for a mikveh is rabbinic, not biblical. Prior to the creation of such a rabbinic decree around 100 BCE, Jews may have immersed in above-ground basins that were built as part of buildings, or affixed to the roofs of buildings, and filled manually. Such structures, dating to the First Temple period, have been discovered in ancient Ashdod and possibly in Dan. The reason for such a rabbinic decree may have been to distance the practice of ritual immersion from the culture of bathhouses, which spread through the region during the Hellenistic period.

Archaeometric studies indicate that many Late Second Temple period mikvehs were built using standardized waterproof plastering techniques found at sites in both Judea and Galilee. These findings suggest that specialist craftsmen transmitted this technical knowledge across the region, although the plaster itself was typically produced from locally available raw materials.

=== Non-Jewish provision in Victorian Turkish baths ===
In the last decades of the 19th century and the first half of the 20th century, a number of mikvaoth were provided for Jewish communities by their local authority or by commercial companies in the area. In what was then the United Kingdom of Great Britain and Ireland, and in parts of the British Empire, these were provided as part of local Victorian Turkish baths.

In 1882, when the Oriental and General Bath Company of Leeds refurbished its 16-year-old baths in Cookridge Street, a mikveh was 'built at the request of the Jewish community, from plans supplied by the Chief Rabbi, and used exclusively by Hebrews . . .' In Ireland, a mikveh was added to the Cork Turkish Bath Company's new baths by its (non-Jewish) proprietor, Alf Jacobs, very soon after they opened in 1891. The mikveh, serving a much smaller community than that in Leeds, had its own entrance through a covered passageway off Charlotte (now Fr Mathew) Quay, and was open even before women had access to the Turkish bath itself. In England, the rebuilding of Nottingham's Victoria Baths in 1896, four years after the corporation took them over from their original lessee, provided the opportunity to add a mikveh, endowed by a prominent member of the Jewish community, German-born Jacob Weinberg. In Wales, the only mikveh built in a Turkish bath by a local authority before the 1950s was not in the capital, Cardiff, but in the Stow Hill baths in Newport with its much smaller and poorer Jewish community.

Further afield, the City Baths in Melbourne, Australia, opened in 1904 and included a mikveh for the orthodox community in East Melbourne. The mikveh closed around 2003 due to a structural defect but was renovated by the city council, working with the local Progressive Jewish community, for use as a non-halachic mikveh. This is still (2026) open.

The mikvaot most recently built in the UK by a local authority were in Bournemouth Corporation's Pier Approach Baths (1937-1984) and in Cardiff's Empire Pool. The latter was opened in 1959, a year after the pool itself, by a Mrs A Sherman deputising for the Chief Rabbi, Dr Israel Brodie. The baths were demolished in 1998 to make way for the Millennium Stadium.

== Requirements ==
The traditional rules regarding the construction of a mikveh are based on those specified in classical rabbinic literature. Numerous biblical laws require Jews to "bathe their flesh in water" to become purified from ritual impurity. The type of bathing is specified in Leviticus 11:36, which states that "a spring, or a cistern, a gathering (mikveh) of water" is a source of purity. A mikveh must be built into the ground or built as an essential part of a building. Portable receptacles, bathtubs, whirlpools, or jacuzzis cannot therefore function as mikvot.

However, many Sephardic communities, as well as Ashkenazi Jews in America before World War 2, customarily allowed mikvehs to be filled using municipal water. Bans on such practices only became common in the US after an influx of European Ashkenazi rabbis, who saw the use of municipal water as too lenient. Some rabbis considered permitting spas to be used, but ultimately decided against it as it may encourage women to prefer warm water during immersion instead of prioritizing cold water. According to Rabbi Isaac Esrig, in 1957 most American mikvaot were filled using municipal water.

=== Water transport ===
Mikveh water must have collected naturally (bidei shamayim) rather than by human action. Thus, mikveh water must flow naturally to the mikveh from the source (rain or a spring). This essentially means that it must be supplied by gravity or a natural pressure gradient and cannot be pumped there by hand or carried. As a result, tap water cannot be used as the primary water source for a mikveh, although it can be used to top the water up to a desired level provided the minimum amount (40 seah) of ritually appropriate water is in the mikveh first; in practice, this means that for a pool of at least 80 seahs (approximately 1,150 litres) the majority of its volume can be tap water. The water is also forbidden to pass through any vessel which could hold water within it or is capable of becoming impure (anything made of metal); however, pipes open to the air at both ends are fine so long as there is no significant curvature). Frozen water (snow, ice and hail) is exceptional in that it may be used to fill the mikveh no matter how it was transported.

Although commonly accepted, at least one American Orthodox rabbi advocated a home mikveh using tap water, for those women who did not have access to a standard mikveh. As water flows through only pipes that open at both ends, the municipal and in-home plumbing would be construed as a non-vessel. So long as the pipes, hoses, and fittings are all freestanding and not held in the hand, they could be used to fill a mikveh receptacle that met all other requirements. The use of tap water for such a mikveh was controversial and was rejected by the majority of rabbinic authorities at the time and afterwards.

The laws for a mikveh are slightly different from those of a spring. Mikveh water must be at rest, while spring water can still be flowing. Thus, flowing rivers may only be used for immersion when most of their water comes from springs, rather than rainfall or snowmelt. Seas may be used (even if waves are present).

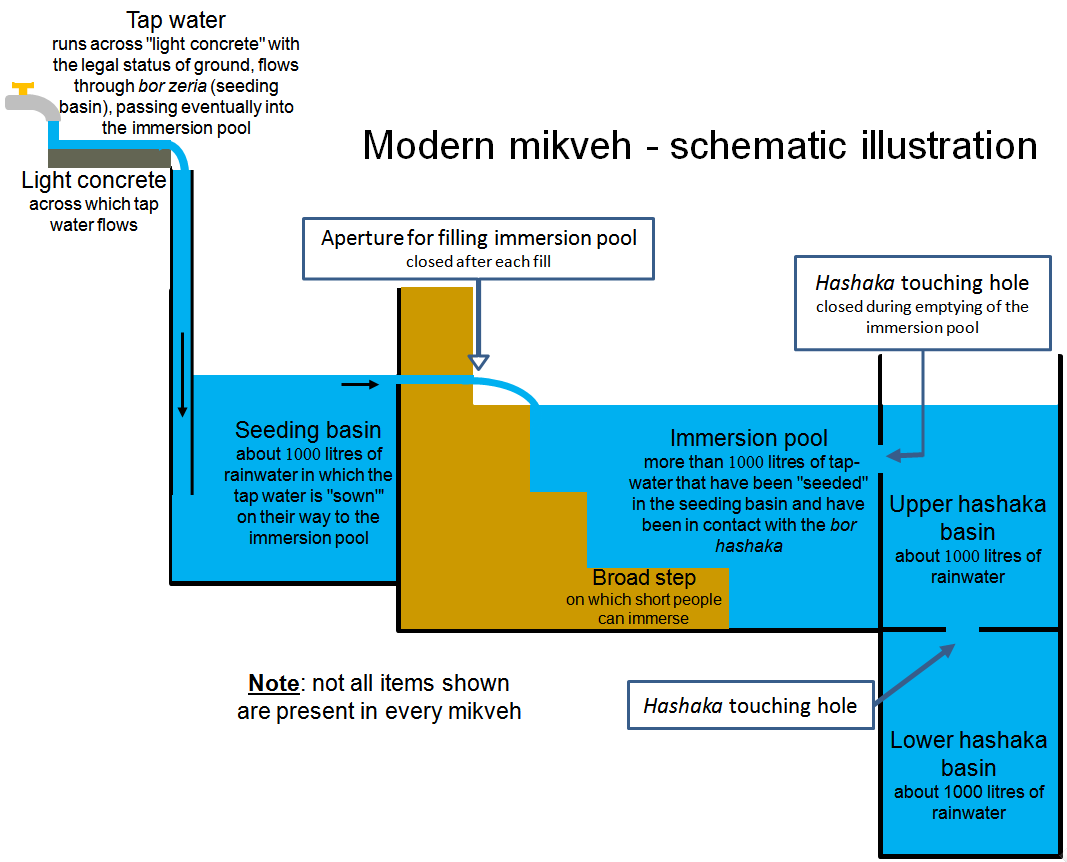
Modern mikveh – schematic illustration

=== Size and practical arrangements ===
A mikveh must contain enough water to cover the entire body of an average-sized person; based on a mikveh with the dimensions of 3 cubits deep, 1 cubit wide, and 1 cubit long, the necessary volume of water was estimated as being 40 seah of water. The exact volume referred to by a seah is debated, and classical rabbinical literature specifies only that it is enough to fit 144 eggs; most Orthodox Jews use the stringent ruling of the Avrohom Yeshaya Karelitz, according to which one seah is 14.3 litres, and therefore a mikveh must contain at least some 575 litres. This volume of water can later be topped up with water from any source, but if there were less than 40 seahs of water in the mikveh to begin with, then the addition of 3 or more pints of water that did not meet the strict requirements would render the mikveh unfit for use, regardless of whether more water from a natural source was added later; a mikveh rendered unfit for use in this way would need to be completely drained away and refilled in the prescribed way.

Inasmuch as water that collects naturally according to halachic prescriptions is hard to come by in urban areas, various methods are employed to establish a valid mikveh. One is that tap water is made to flow into a kosher mikveh and through a conduit into a larger pool in which users actually bathe. A second method is to create a mikveh in a deep pool, place a floor with holes over that and then fill the upper pool with tap water. In this way, it is considered as if the person dipping is actually "in" the pool of rain water. Additionally, the hashoko method involves using two pools: one filled with at least 40 seahs of natural water and one filled with tap water. A hole at least 5 cm (2 in) wide on the wall of the pool filled with tap water connects it to the pool filled with natural water. When these two collections of water touch, the tap water pool is okay to use for ritual immersion.

Most contemporary mikvot are indoor constructions involving rainwater collected from a cistern and passed through a duct by gravity into an ordinary bathing pool; the mikveh can be heated to make the experience of bathing more comfortable.

== Background ==
=== Laws ===
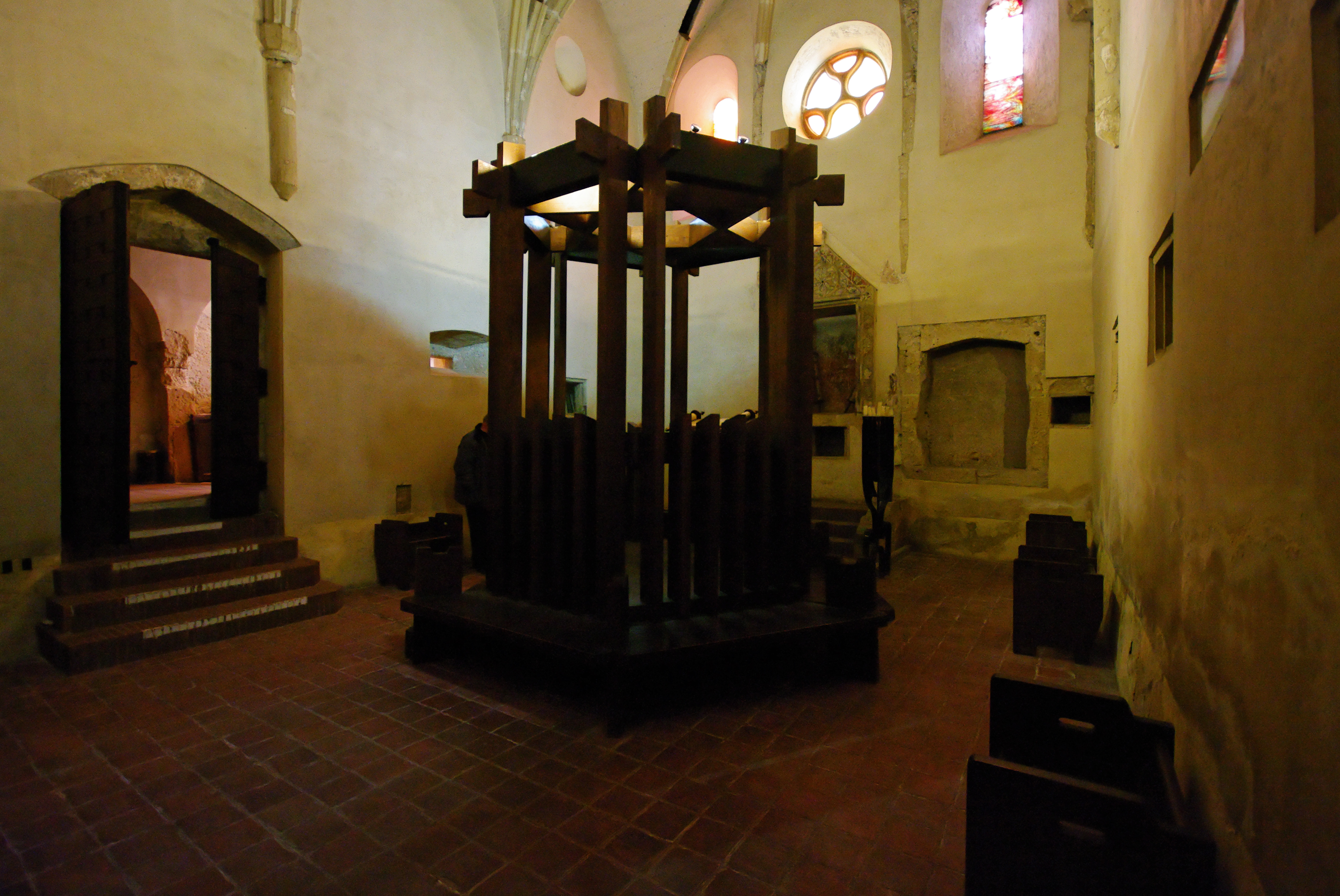
Medieval Mikveh room in the old Synagogue of Sopron, Hungary, which dates to the 14th century

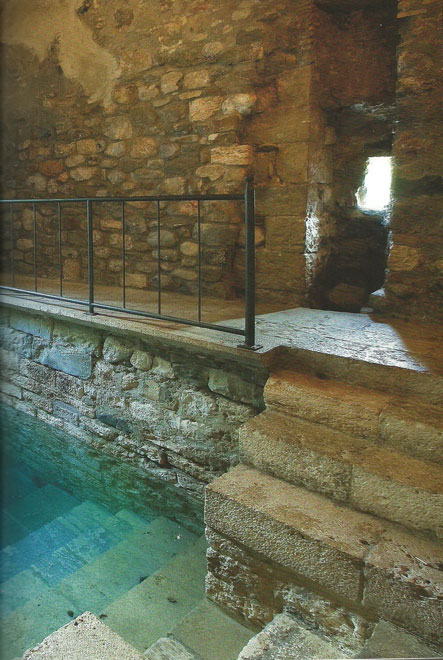
A medieval mikveh in Besalú, Spain

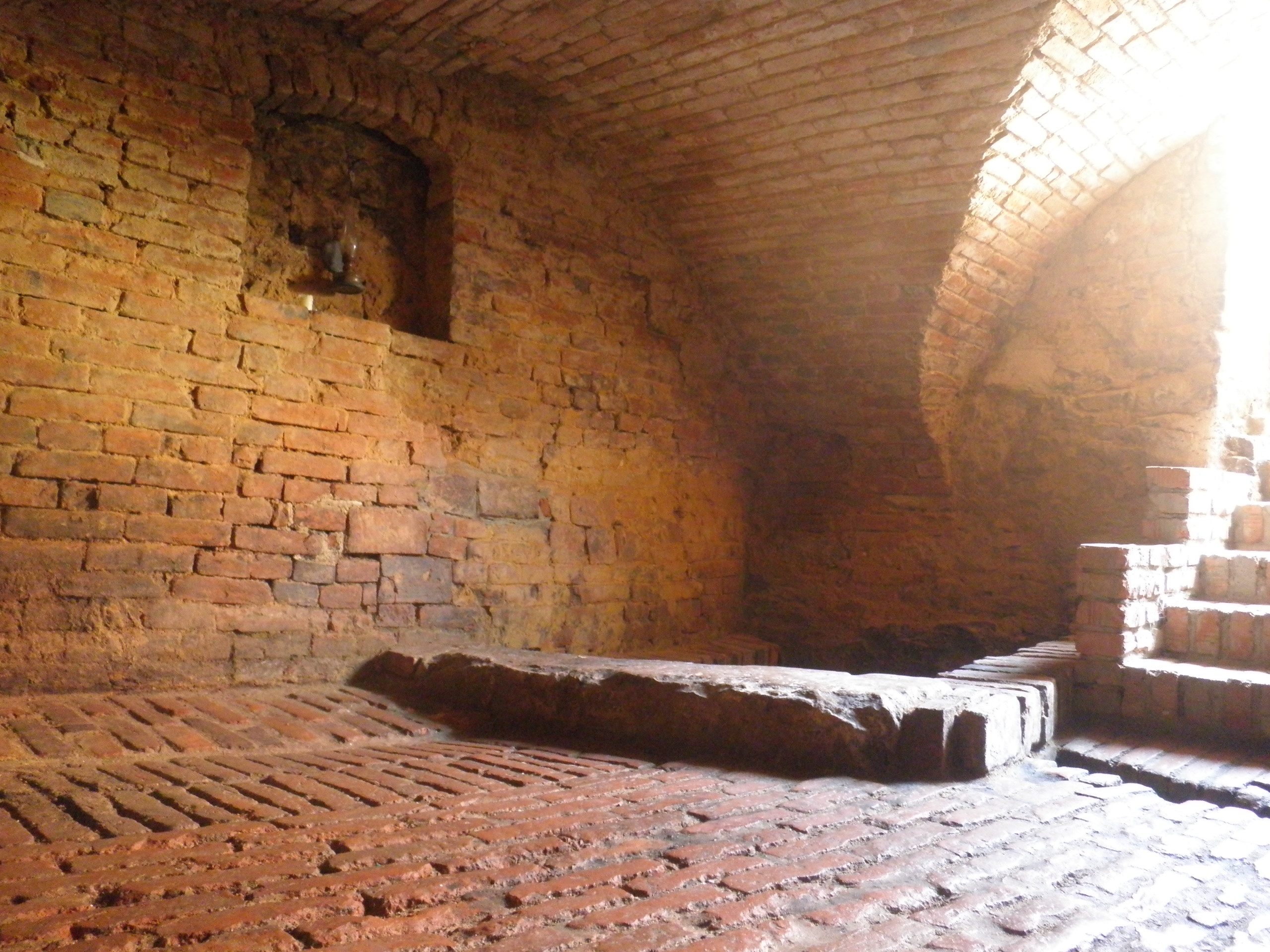
A mikveh from Boskovice in the Czech Republic

Traditionally, the mikveh was used by both men and women to regain ritual purity after various events, according to regulations laid down in the Torah and in classical rabbinical literature.

Cases where Jews commonly immerse in a mikveh nowadays, in order to fulfill a requirement of Torah or rabbinic law, include:

- a woman who wishes to become purified from the status of niddah (menstruation) or the related status of zavah (abnormal discharges of body fluids). In particular, a married woman must immerse in order to resume marital relations with her husband after menstruation or childbirth. (The male equivalent of zavah, known as zav, cannot be purified in a mikveh but rather must immerse in running spring water.)
- one who is converting to Judaism, regardless of gender.
- Newly acquired utensils used in serving and eating food must be immersed (Tevilat Kelim).

Other cases where immersion in a mikveh would be required to become pure, but have not generally been practiced since destruction of the Temple (as a state of purity is generally not required outside the Temple), include:

- a man who has experienced keri (normal emissions of semen, whether from sexual activity, or from nocturnal emission). Immersing due to keri is required by the Torah in order that one should be allowed to eat terumah or a sacrifice; Ezra instituted that one should also do so in order to be allowed to recite words of Torah. The latter case is known as tevilath Ezra ("the immersion of Ezra"). In modern times it is no longer considered obligatory, but some perform it as a custom or act of piety.
- one who has come into contact with a niddah or zavah, or their clothes or articles
- after tzaraath
- a Kohen who is being consecrated
- the Kohen Gadol on goes to Mikvah five times on Yom Kippur;
- the Kohen who performed the red heifer ritual;
- one who has contacted a corpse or grave, in addition to having the ashes of the red heifer ritual sprinkled upon them;
- one who has eaten meat from an animal that died naturally.
- one who wishes to visit the Temple Mount (this is still practiced by some modern Jews whose rabbinic authorities follow a minority opinion to permit such visits)

=== Customs ===
Customs exist to immerse in a mikveh in some of the following circumstances, with the customs varying by community:

- By a bridegroom, on the day of his wedding
- By a father, prior to the circumcision of his son
- Before Yom Kippur, sometimes including married women as well as men
- Before Rosh Hashana
- By a kohen, prior to a service in which he will recite the Priestly Blessing
- Before a Jewish holiday, either as an extension of the custom of kohanim to immerse before holidays when they would recite the priestly blessing or in order to purify oneself before a holiday as was required in the times of the Temple.
- At some point during the ninth month of pregnancy
- Before each Shabbat, especially prevalent in Hasidic custom
- Every day, in Hasidic custom
- Some Jewish funeral homes have a mikveh for immersing a body during the purification procedure (taharah) before burial.
- In recent years, some members and leaders in Non-Orthodox communities have promoted the idea of immersing in a Mikveh in special circumstances. There are reports of women immersing after a miscarriage, rape, divorce, menopause, graduation of a child from school, retirement, etc. The idea behind these new types of reason for immersion is to help people cope with either traumas or major life changes and transitions, and to show how they can incorporate in their life old Jewish traditions even if they are not committed to the details of Jewish law.

Immersion for men is more common in Hasidic communities, and done rarely in others, like German Jewish communities, where it is generally done only before the High Holidays.

== Requirements during use ==
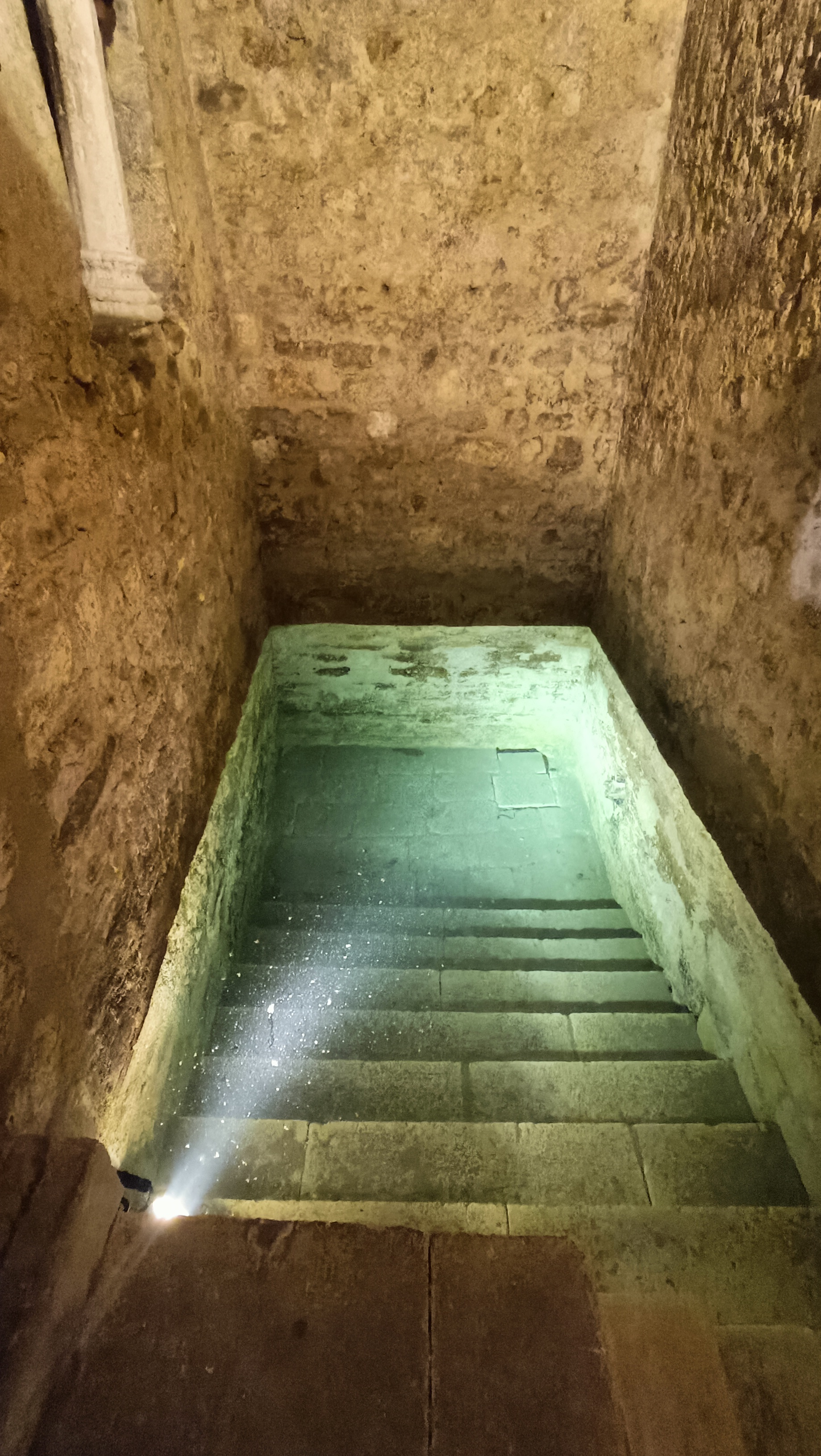
Montpellier (France) mikveh in 2022

There is supposed to be no barrier between the person immersing and the water. The person must be completely naked, removing all clothing, jewelry, makeup, nail polish, and hair or skin products to ensure no barriers exist between the body and the water. The person should carefully wash the hair and the body, removing calluses and dead skin prior. Some trim nails prior to immersion. Hair on the head and body is to be thoroughly combed, although exceptions are sometimes made for hair styled in dreadlocks. The mouth should be thoroughly cleaned and removable dental appliances are usually taken out. The person should carefully check their body after preparation, and sometimes an attendant will also check to ensure these requirements are met. Showering or bathing and carefully checking the whole body is, therefore, part of the religious requirements before entering the water of a mikveh. Although technically the requirements are the same for men and women, the common practice is that men do not go to great lengths to clean themselves before immersion since the immersion (with rare exceptions) is not Halakhically obligatory.

According to rabbinical tradition, the hair counts as part of the body, and therefore water is required to touch all parts of it, meaning that braids cannot be worn during immersion. This has resulted in debate between the various ethnic groups within Judaism, about whether hair combing is necessary before immersion. The Ashkenazi community generally supports the view that hair must be combed straight so that there are no knots, but some take issue with this stance, particularly when it comes to dreadlocks. A number of rabbinical rulings argue in support of dreadlocks, on the basis that

- dreadlocks can sometimes be loose enough to become thoroughly saturated with water, particularly if the person had first showered
- combing dreadlocked hair can be painful
- although a particularly cautious individual would consider a single knotted hair as an obstruction, in most cases hair is loose enough for water to pass through it unless each hair is individually knotted

== Modern practice ==
=== Orthodox Judaism ===
Orthodox Judaism generally adheres to the classical regulations and traditions, and consequently Orthodox Jewish women are obligated to immerse in a mikveh between niddah and sexual relations with their husbands. This includes brides before their marriage, and married women after their menstruation period or childbirth.

In accordance with Orthodox rules concerning modesty, men and women immerse in separate mikveh facilities in different locations, or else use the mikveh at different designated times.

In May 2026, the first mikveh reported on an Israeli military base was inaugurated at an Israel Border Police base in central Israel, beside a small synagogue. Before its construction, some personnel used mikvaot in nearby communities before missions.

=== Conservative Judaism ===
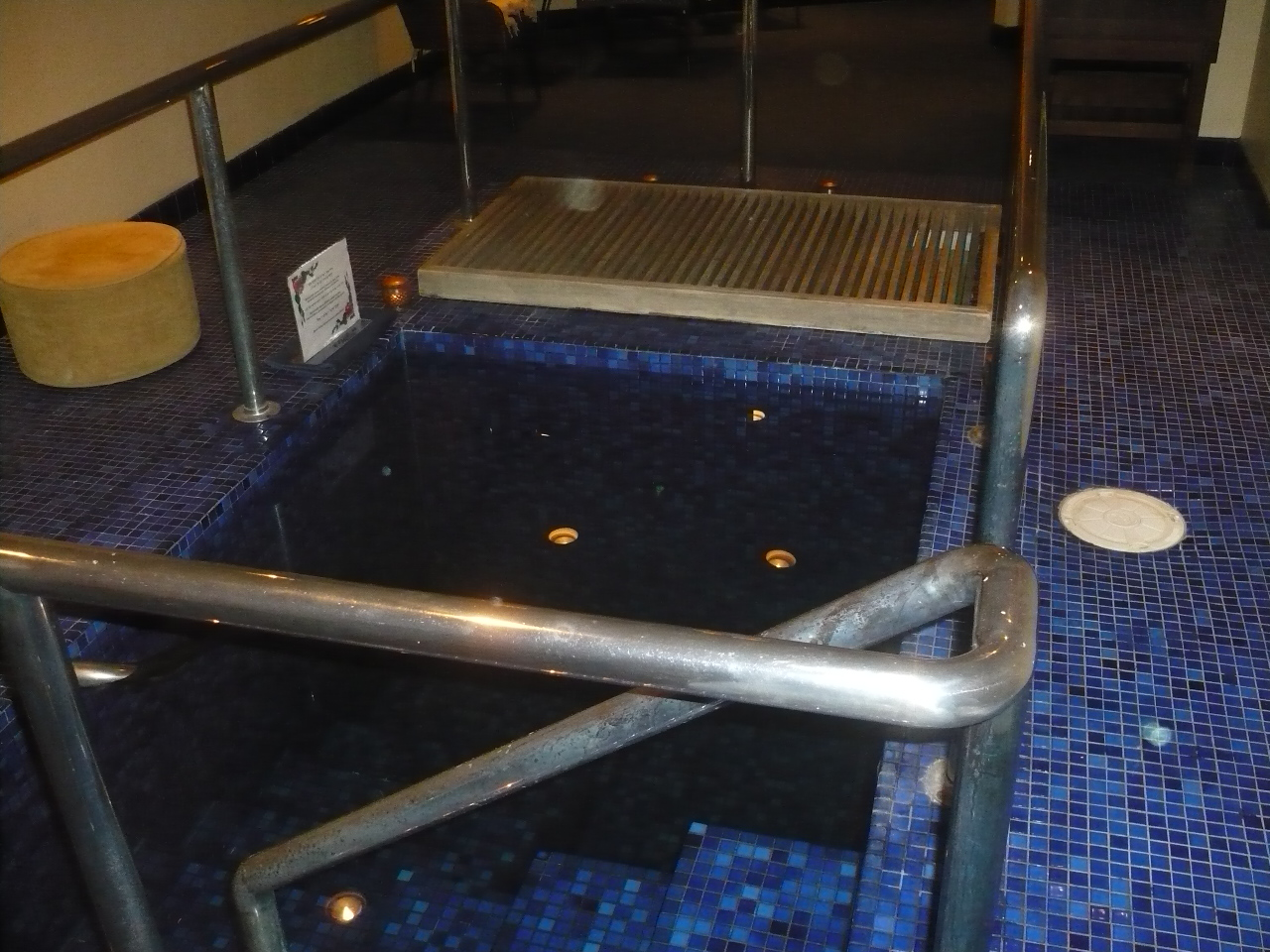
The mikveh at the American Jewish University in Los Angeles, California

In a series of responsa in 2006, the Committee on Jewish Law and Standards of Conservative Judaism reaffirmed a requirement that Conservative women use a mikveh monthly following the end of the niddah period following menstruation, while adopting certain leniencies including reducing the length of the nidda period. The three responsa adopted permit a range of approaches from an opinion reaffirming the traditional ritual to an opinion declaring the concept of ritual purity does not apply outside the Temple in Jerusalem, proposing a new theological basis for the ritual, adapting new terminology including renaming the observances related to menstruation from taharat hamishpacha family purity to kedushat hamishpaha [family holiness] to reflect the view that the concept of ritual purity is no longer considered applicable, and adopting certain leniencies including reducing the length of the niddah period.

Isaac Klein's A Guide to Jewish Religious Practice, a comprehensive guide frequently used within Conservative Judaism, also addresses Conservative views on other uses of a mikveh, but because it predates the 2006 opinions, it describes an approach more closely resembling the Orthodox one, and does not address the leniencies and views those opinions reflected. Rabbi Miriam Berkowitz's recent book Taking the Plunge: A Practical and Spiritual Guide to the Mikveh (Jerusalem: Schechter Institute, 2007) offers a comprehensive discussion of contemporary issues and new mikveh uses along with traditional reasons for observance, details of how to prepare and what to expect, and how the laws developed. Conservative Judaism encourages, but does not require, immersion before Jewish Holidays (including Yom Kippur), nor the immersion of utensils purchased from non-Jews. New uses are being developed throughout the liberal world for healing (after rape, incest, divorce, etc.) or celebration (milestone birthdays, anniversaries, ordination, or reading Torah for the first time).

As in Orthodox Judaism, converts to Judaism through the Conservative movement are required to immerse themselves in a mikveh. Two Jews must witness the event, at least one of which must actually see the immersion. Immersion into a mikveh has been described as a very emotional, life-changing experience similar to a graduation.

=== Reform and Reconstructionist Judaism ===
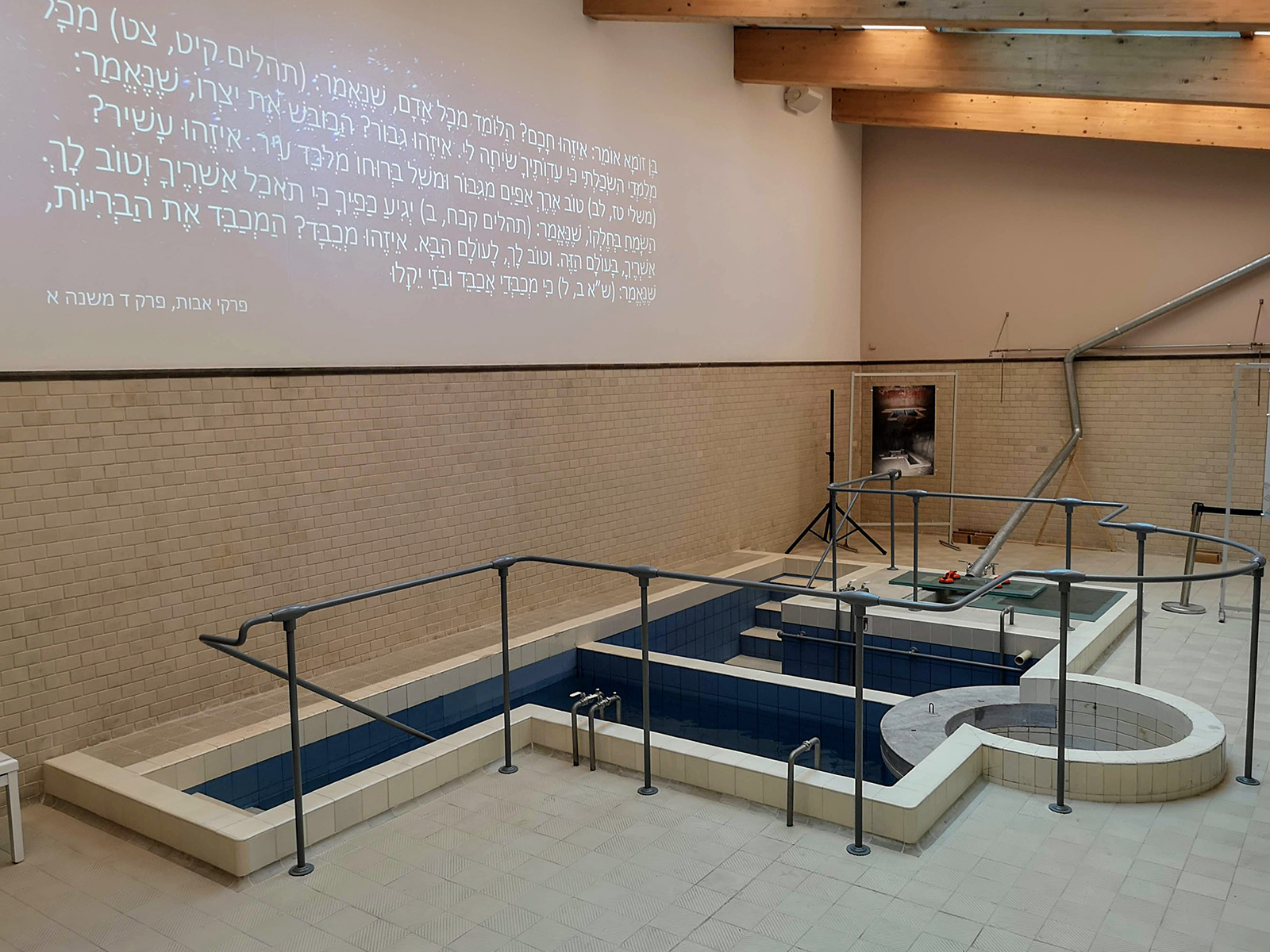
Restored mikveh in White Stork Synagogue, Wrocław, Poland

Reform and Reconstructionist Judaism do not hold the halachic requirements of mikveh the way Conservative and Orthodox Judaism do, but some Reform and Reconstructionist rabbis recommend a mikveh ceremony. However, there are growing trends toward using mikveh for conversions, wedding preparation, and even before holidays. In the 21st century the mikveh is experiencing a revival among progressive Jews who view immersion as a way to mark transitions in their lives. By 2001, the Central Conference of American Rabbis began to recommend a mikveh ceremony for converts.

"Open" mikvot welcome Jews to consider immersion for reasons not necessarily required by Jewish law; they might immerse following a divorce or medical treatment, to find closure after an abortion, or to celebrate a life transition, among other reasons. Progressive Jews may also use the mikveh for conversion.

=== Transgender people ===
In more recent times, many transgender Jews have begun to use the practice of mikveh immersion to mark milestones in their gender transition. For example, Mayyim Hayyim, an organization in Newton, Massachusetts, has collaborated with Keshet to actively create a mikveh space accessible and inclusive to transgender Jews. The organization has a growing library of ceremonies that includes a ceremony for transition milestones, adapted from blessings written by the transgender Rabbi Elliot Rose Kukla.

== Interpretations ==
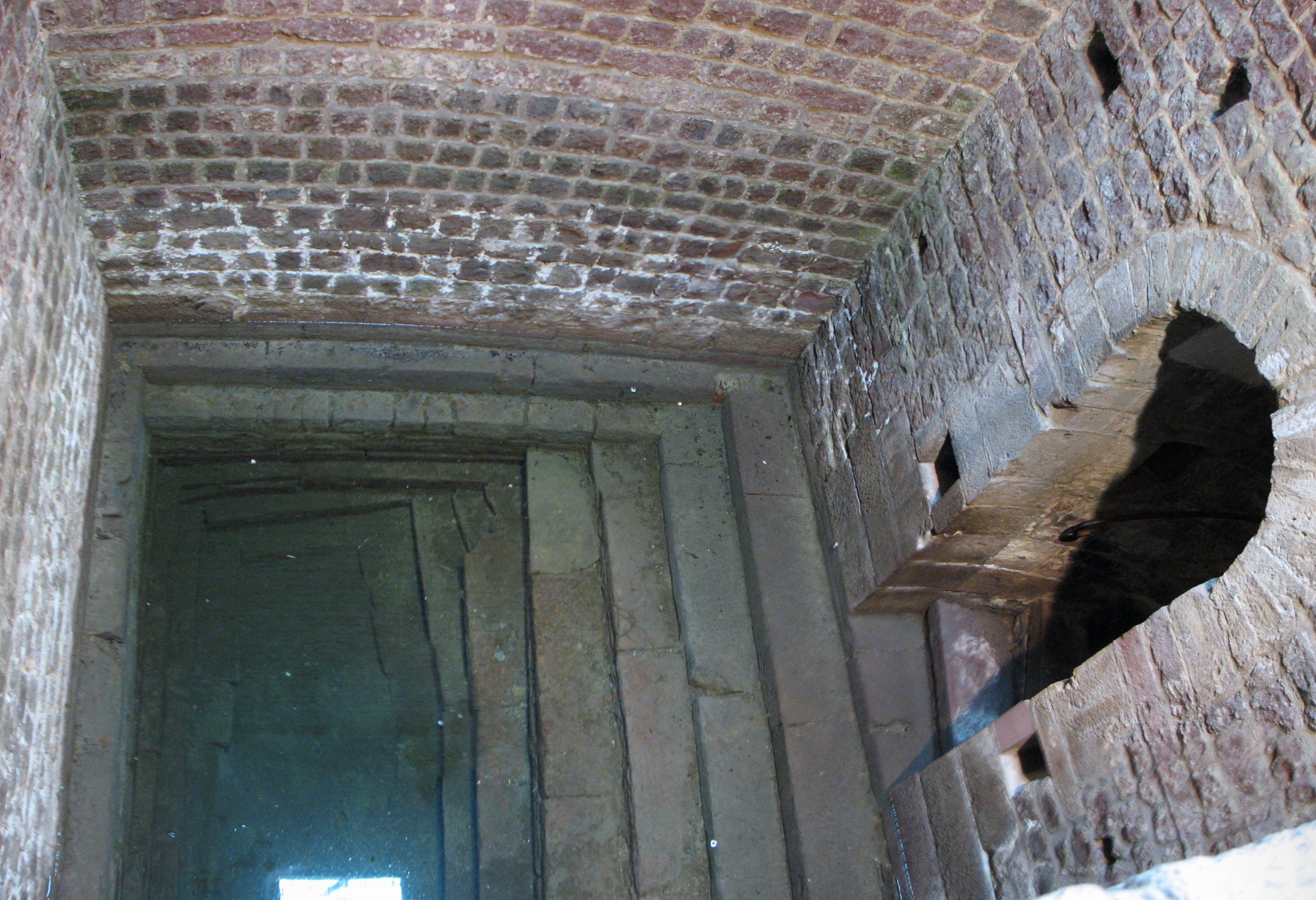
Pool of a medieval mikveh in Speyer, dating back to 1128

Rabbi Aryeh Kaplan connects the laws of impurity to the narrative in the beginning of Genesis. According to Genesis, by eating of the fruit, Adam and Eve had brought death into the world. Kaplan points out that most of the laws of impurity relate to some form of death (or in the case of niddah the loss of a potential life). One who comes into contact with one of the forms of death must then immerse in water which is described in Genesis as flowing out of the Garden of Eden (the source of life) in order to cleanse oneself of this contact with death (and by extension of sin).

According to Rabbi Abraham Isaac Kook, by immersing in the mikveh, "we are forced to recognize our existential estrangement from the physical universe. How long can we survive under water? The experience of submerging drives home the realization that our existence in this world is transient, and we should strive towards more lasting goals."

A custom exists to read the seventh chapter of the Mikvaot tractate of the Mishnah following a funeral. This tractate covers the laws of the mikveh, and the seventh chapter starts with a discussion of substances which can be used as valid water sources for a mikveh—snow, hail, frost, ice, salt, and pourable mud. This alludes to the belief in resurrection, as "living water" in a lifeless frozen state (as ice) can still become living water again (after melting).

=== Allegory ===
The word mikveh makes use of the same root letters in Hebrew as the word for "hope", and this has served as the basis for homiletical comparison of the two concepts in both biblical and rabbinic literature. For instance, in the Book of Jeremiah, the word mikveh is used in the sense of "hope", but at the same time also associated with "living water":

O Hashem, the Hope [mikveh] of Israel, all who forsake you will be ashamed... because they have forsaken Hashem, the fountain of living water

Are there any of the worthless idols of the nations, that can cause rain? or can the heavens give showers? Is it not you, Hashem our God, and do we not hope [nekaveh] in you? For you have made all these things.

In the Mishnah, following on from a discussion of Yom Kippur, Rabbi Akiva compares mikveh immersion to the relationship between God and Israel. Akiva refers to the description of God in the Book of Jeremiah as the "Mikveh of Israel", and suggests that "just as a mikveh purifies the contaminated, so does the Holy One, blessed is he, purify Israel".

== Controversies ==
=== Use by non-Orthodox converts ===
The Reform Movement's Israel Religious Action Center sued the state on behalf of the Reform and Conservative/Masorti movements to allow members to use publicly funded mikvot. The case, which took ten years to resolve, resulted in the Israeli Supreme Court ruling that public ritual baths must accept all prospective converts to Judaism, including converts to Reform and Conservative Judaism. In his 2016 ruling, Supreme Court Justice Elyakim Rubinstein said barring certain converts amounts to discrimination. Until this ruling, Orthodox officials barred non-Orthodox converts from using any mikveh, as their traditions do not technically conform to Jewish law, and the people they convert are therefore not technically Jews. Rubinstein noted: "Once it established public mikvahs, and put them at the service of the public—including for the process of conversion—the State cannot but be even-handed in allowing their use." He also said. "The State of Israel is free to supervise the use of its mikvahs, so long as it does so in an egalitarian manner."

=== Intrusive questions ===
In 2013, the Israeli Center for Women's Justice and Kolech, an organization committed to Orthodox Jewish feminism, petitioned the Supreme Court to forbid attendants from asking intrusive questions of women at state-funded and -operated mikvot. In response, the Chief Rabbinate said it would forbid questioning of women about their marital status before immersion. The complaint had charged that the practice represented unacceptable discrimination. In 2015, however, the ITIM Advocacy Center filed a complaint with the Israeli Supreme Court on behalf of 13 Orthodox women against the Chief Rabbinate and the Jerusalem Religious Council, insisting that women be allowed to use the mikvah "according to their personal customs and without supervision, or with their own attendant if they wish". The complaint charged that the Chief Rabbinate is ignoring directives passed in 2013 that allow women to use the mikvah facilities without being asked intrusive questions by attendants. In June 2016, the Chief Rabbinate agreed to allow women to use a mikveh without an attendant.

== See also ==
- Baptism, Ghusl, Misogi, Masbuta, Tamasha – similar rituals in other religions
- Bath (unit)
- Ritual washing in Judaism

== Bibliography ==
- Isaac Klein, A Guide to Jewish Religious Practice, JTS Press, New York, 1992
- Kolel Menachem, Kitzur Dinei Taharah: A Digest of the Niddah Laws Following the Rulings of the Rebbes of Chabad, Kehot Publication Society, Brooklyn, New York, 2005
