= 2006 in Israel =

- Decades: 1980s; 1990s; 2000s; 2010s; 2020s
- See also: History of Israel; Timeline of Israeli history; List of years in Israel

Events in the year 2006 in Israel.

== Incumbents ==
- President of Israel – Moshe Katsav
- Prime Minister of Israel – Ariel Sharon to January 4, Ehud Olmert
- President of the Supreme Court – Aharon Barak to 16 September, Dorit Beinisch
- Chief of General Staff – Dan Halutz
- Government of Israel – 30th Government of Israel to May 4, 31st Government of Israel

== Events ==
- January 4 – Prime Minister Ariel Sharon suffers a severe hemorrhagic stroke and falls into a coma. As a result, Sharon's deputy Ehud Olmert begins exercising the powers of the office of Prime Minister.
- February 1 – The demolition of nine permanent structures in the community settlement Amona in the central West Bank escalates into a violent confrontation between the police and the Special Patrol Unit to the settlers in which hundreds of settlers and dozens of police officers are injured.
- February 3 – Hezbollah fires some 30 mortar shells at IDF outposts along Israel's northern border, lightly wounding an Israeli soldier. In response, the Israeli Air Force strikes Hezbollah targets in southern Lebanon.
- February 14 – The Tel Aviv Magistrates Court sentences Omri Sharon, the Israeli politician and son of former Israeli Prime Minister Ariel Sharon, to a nine-month prison term, a nine-month suspended sentence and a NIS 300,000 fine after he is convicted of violating political fund-raising law and providing false testimony.
- March 28 – Kadima leader Ehud Olmert declares victory in the 17th Israeli legislative election, ahead of main opponents Labor and Likud.
- May 4 – Ehud Olmert presents his cabinet for a Knesset "Vote of Confidence". The 31st government is approved that day and the members were sworn in.
- 20 May – Eddie Butler represents Israel at the Eurovision Song Contest with the song “Together We Are One”.
- June 12 – Five people are killed, and about 80 injured, when an Israeli train travelling between Tel Aviv and Haifa collides with a truck on a level crossing near Netanya.
- July 8 – President Moshe Katsav initially complains to the Attorney General of Israel, Menahem Mazuz, that he was being blackmailed by one of his female employees, whom he was later suspected of raping.
- September 17 – Dorit Beinisch takes office as President of the Supreme Court of Israel, the first woman to hold this position.

2006 Lebanon War:

- July 12 – Hezbollah militants fire rockets at Israeli border towns as a diversion for an anti-tank missile attack on two IDF armored Israeli Humvees patrolling the Israeli side of the border fence. The ambush leaves three IDF soldiers dead. Two other IDF soldiers, believed to have been killed outright or mortally wounded, are snatched by Hezbollah to Lebanon. Five more IDF soldiers are killed in a failed rescue attempt. This event and the escalation that follows lead to the 2006 Lebanon War.
- July 12 – August 14 – Israel launches Operation Just Reward, a counterattack that began with air force bombing of Hezbollah positions in Southern Lebanon.
- August 1 – August 2 – Operation Sharp and Smooth – Israel Defense Forces raid a Hezbollah-run hospital in Lebanon's Bekaa Valley.
- August 4 – Tyre raid – Night mission is carried out by the Israel Defense Forces frogmen, Shayetet 13, in the southern Lebanon town of Tyre. It targets the Hezbollah cell responsible for the rocket attack on Hadera on the previous day.
- August 11 – August 14 – Operation Changing Direction 11 – Final offensive push by the Israel Defense Forces during the Lebanon War.
- August 14 – A United Nations-brokered ceasefire goes into effect, which brings an end to the 2006 Lebanon War.

Post-war:

- October 29 – The Attorney-General of Israel delivers a brief to the Supreme Court of Israel arguing that the President of Israel, Moshe Katsav, should stand aside pending a possible indictment for rape.
- November 12 – Iranian nuclear program: Israel threatens to launch air strikes on Iran's nuclear facilities "as a last resort", and the Iranian foreign ministry responds that it would "retaliate with a crushing blow" should Israel act.
- November 21 – The Supreme Court of Israel orders the government to recognize same-sex marriages performed abroad.
- November 24 – Serial rapist Benny Sela escapes from police custody while being transferred to a court hearing. His escape launches a nationwide search, involving thousands of Israeli police officers.
- December 8 – Benny Sela is captured near Nahariya two weeks after his escape.
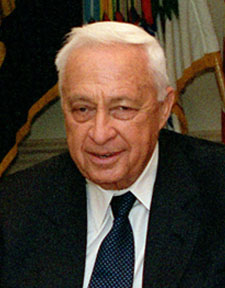
On January 4 Prime Minister Ariel Sharon suffers a severe hemorrhagic stroke and falls into a coma. As a result, power is transferred to his deputy, Vice Minister Ehud Olmert.

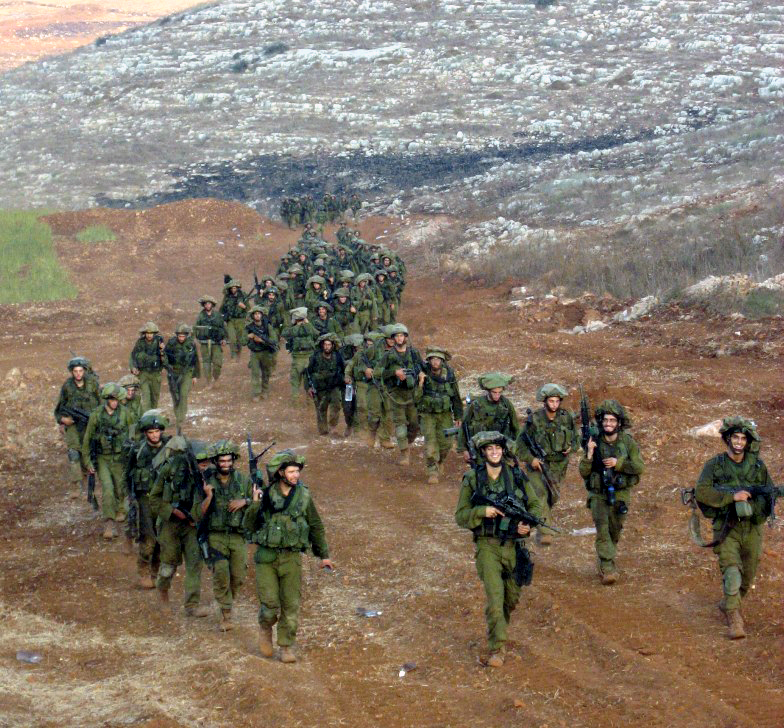
2006 Lebanon War – photo of Israeli soldiers of the Nahal Brigade leaving Lebanon.

=== Undated ===
- Slonim-Nevo Commission is established.

=== Israeli–Palestinian conflict ===
The most prominent events related to the Israeli–Palestinian conflict that occurred during 2006 include:

- January 25 – Hamas wins the majority of seats in the Palestinian Authority legislative election. Israel, the United States, the European Union, and several European and Western countries cut off their aid to the Palestinian Authority, as they view the Islamist political party who rejects Israel's right to exist as a terrorist organization.
- March 23 – Israeli security sources capture the Hamas military commander in the West Bank, Ibrahim Hamed, who ordered suicide bombing attacks during the Al-Aqsa Intifada, in a Ramallah raid.
- June 9 – An explosion occurs on a Gaza beach, killing eight and injuring thirty Palestinian civilians. The Israeli army and Israeli officials initially took responsibility. A subsequent investigation by the Israeli Defence Forces blamed the explosion on a Palestinian land mine. This investigation was criticized by Human Rights Watch and The Guardian.

Notable Palestinian militant operations against Israeli targets

The most prominent Palestinian militant acts and operations committed against Israeli targets during 2006 include:

- January 19 – Rosh Ha'ir restaurant bombing: 20 Israelis are injured in a bombing at a fast-food restaurant in Tel Aviv.
- February 3 – At least three Qassam rockets are fired from Gaza by Palestinian Arab militants at Israeli civilian targets. One rocket strikes a home in Kibbutz Karmia, injuring four people, including a one-year-old infant. The home belongs to a family recently evicted during Israel's 2005 unilateral disengagement from the Gaza Strip.
- March 28 – For the first time, a Katyusha rocket is fired from the Gaza Strip into Israel. (JPost)(BBC)(MSNBC) Katyushas, frequently used by Hezbollah in Lebanon, had never previously been fired from Gaza. Large numbers of Qassam rockets began landing in the Western Negev in March 2006.
- March 30 – Kedumim bombing: Four Israelis are killed, including one child, by a Palestinian Arab suicide bomber posing as Jewish hitchhiker, in Kedumim.
- April 17 – 2006 Tel Aviv shawarma restaurant bombing: A suicide attack carried out by the Palestinian Islamic Jihad together with Al-Aqsa Martyrs' Brigades near the Old Tel Aviv Central Bus Station. 11 Israelis are killed in the attack while 68 were wounded.
- June 25 – 2006 Hamas cross-border raid: a group of Hamas militants infiltrate an Israeli army post on the Israeli side of the southern Gaza Strip border after crossing through a tunnel near the Kerem Shalom border, kill two IDF soldiers and manage to capture and abduct the IDF soldier Gilad Shalit back into the Gaza Strip. Shalit has been held as a prisoner in the Gaza Strip by Hamas since then. During the attack, two Palestinian militants involved in the attack were also killed.
- June 25 – Murder of Eliyahu Asheri: The Palestinian Arab militant group PRC kidnaps and an hour later kills a 19-year-old Israeli tertiary student, Eliyahu Asheri.
- July 5 – First Qassam rocket of increased strength is fired into the schoolyard in the Southern Israeli coastal city of Ashkelon. This is the first time that rockets capable of reaching a significantly large Israeli city are fired by Palestinian Arabs into Israel and, accordingly, the first instance that such a city is attacked. No one was injured in this attack.

Notable Israeli military operations against Palestinian militancy targets

The most prominent Israeli military counter-terrorism operations (military campaigns and military operations) carried out against Palestinian militants during 2006 include:

- March 14 – Operation Bringing Home the Goods: IDF military operation in a Palestinian Authority prison in Jericho in order to capture several Palestinian Arab prisoners located there who had assassinated the Israeli politician Rehavam Ze'evi. The operation is conducted as a result of the expressed intentions of the newly elected Hamas government to release these prisoners.
- May 3 – The Israeli Navy foiled an attempt to smuggle some 550 kg of TNT into the Gaza Strip. The smugglers reached Gaza without their cargo, which was recovered at sea by the Israeli Navy.
- May 14 – The IDF kill Elias al-Ashkar, the senior Islamic Jihad commander in the Jenin area, who was accused of planning several suicide attacks that killed nearly 30 people. Six other Palestinian Arabs are also killed.
- June 13 – The IDF kill eleven people in a missile strike on a van carrying Palestinian Arab militants and rockets driving through a densely civilian populated area in Gaza. Nine among those killed are civilian bystanders.
- June 28 – November 26 – Operation Summer Rains: Israel launches an offensive against militants in Gaza in response to the killing of two soldiers and the kidnapping of the Israeli soldier Corporal Gilad Shalit on June 25, 2006, and the firing of Qassam rockets toward Israel.
- June 29 – Israeli soldiers arrest 62 Hamas members in the West Bank, including 8 ministers and 20 lawmakers in the Palestinian Authority. Israeli officials announce that the suspects will face standard criminal proceedings.
- November 4 – Operation Autumn Clouds: Israel Defense Forces mount a series of air strikes as part of an ongoing Gaza offensive, killing at least eight.
- November 8 – 2006 shelling of Beit Hanoun: An incident in which the Israel Defense Forces' shells hit a row of houses in the Gaza Strip town of Beit Hanoun, killing 19 Palestinian Arabs and wounding more than 40. Israel apologized and attributed the incident to a technical malfunction.

== Notable deaths ==
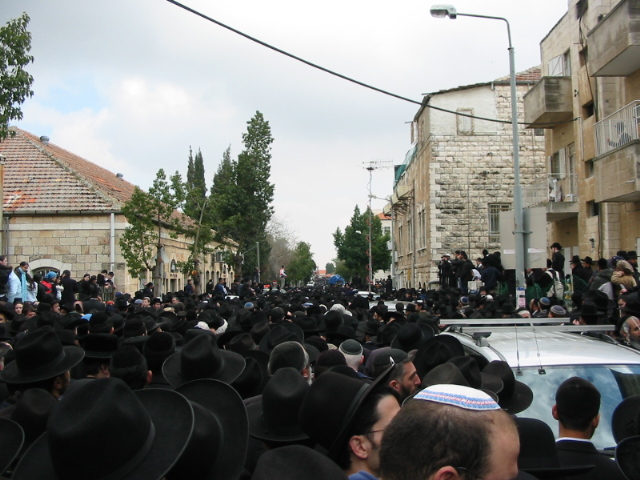
Yitzchak Kaduri's funeral in Jerusalem

- January 28 – Yitzchak Kaduri (b. c.1899), Iraqi-born estimated aged 107, a renowned Mizrahi Haredi rabbi and kabbalist.
- February 14 – Shoshana Damari (born 1923), Yemeni-born "Queen of Israeli song" – pneumonia.
- April 13 – Michael Shir (born 1923), Polish-born Israeli writer, founder of children's magazine, Ezbeoni.
- April 26 – Professor Yuval Ne'eman (born 1925), Israeli physicist, founder of the Israel Space Agency and former science minister.
- April 28 – Ben-Zion Orgad (born 1926), German-born Israeli composer – cancer.
- May 11 – Yossi Banai (born 1932), Israeli singer and actor.
- May 19 – Yitzhak Ben-Aharon (born 1906), aged 99, Austro-Hungarian (Bukovina)-born founder of the Israeli Labor Party.
- May 23 – Bracha Eden (born 1928), Israeli pianist – brain hemorrhage.
- June 7 – Joseph Dorfman (born 1940), Soviet-born Russian-Israeli composer of contemporary classical music and a Shostakovich scholar.
- June 25 – Eliyahu Asheri (born 1988), Israeli civilian kidnapped and murdered by Palestinian Arab terrorists.
- June 25 – Gad Navon (born 1922), Moroccan-born Former Chief Israeli military rabbi – cancer.
- July 25 – Ezra Fleischer (born 1928), Romanian-born Israeli poet and professor at Hebrew University of Jerusalem.
- August 21 – S. Yizhar (born 1916), Israeli author – heart disease.
- August 29 – Benjamin Rawitz-Castel (born 1946), Israeli pianist – battered.
- November 21 – Eliezer Waldenberg (born 1915), Israeli Haredi rabbi.
- December 16 – Pnina Salzman (born 1922), Israeli classical pianist – natural causes.
- December 28 – Gershon Shaked (born 1929), Austrian-born Israeli author and professor of Hebrew literature.
- December 31 – Ya'akov Hodorov (born 1927), Israeli football goalkeeper – stroke.

== See also ==
- 2006 in Israeli film
- Israel in the Eurovision Song Contest 2006
- Israel at the 2006 Winter Olympics
- 2006 in the Palestinian territories
