= Two Kings =

Two Kings may refer to:

- Two Kings (book series), by Fishel Jacobs
- The Two Kings an expansion pack for The Settlers 7: Paths to a Kingdom
- 2 Kings, a book of the Christian Old Testament
- 2 Kings (album), an album by Nigerian rappers Olamide and Phyno
- Er Wang (disambiguation)
