= Military Rabbinate =

Israeli military unit

- חיל הרבנות הצבאית
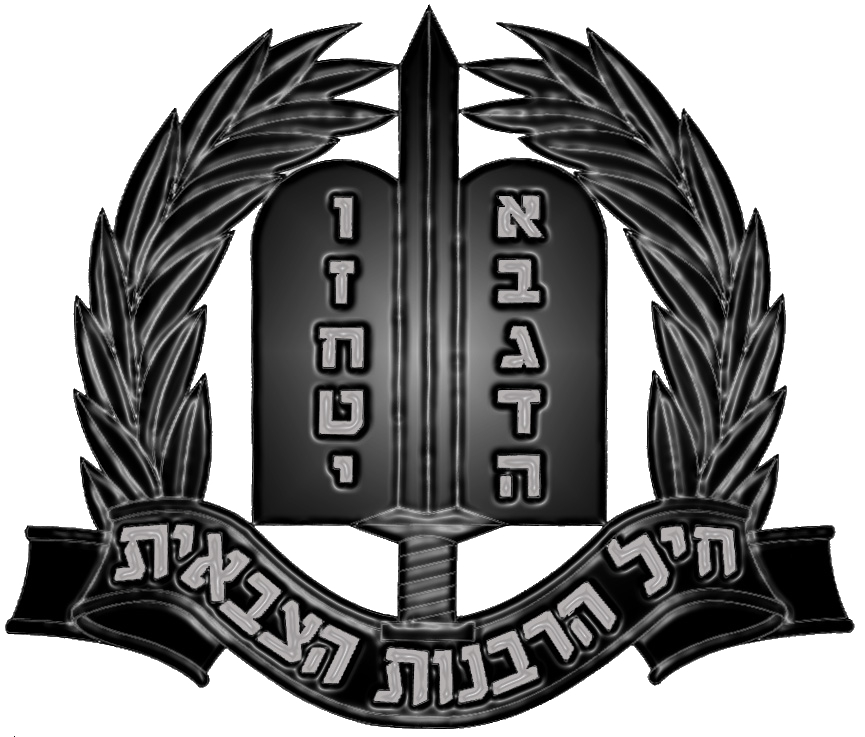
- The Military Rabbinate Corps Emblem
- Active: 1948
- Country: Israel
- Allegiance: Israeli Defense Force
- Type: Religious services

Commanders
- Current commander: Brigadier General; Eyal Krim
- Notable commanders: Rabbi Shlomo Goren

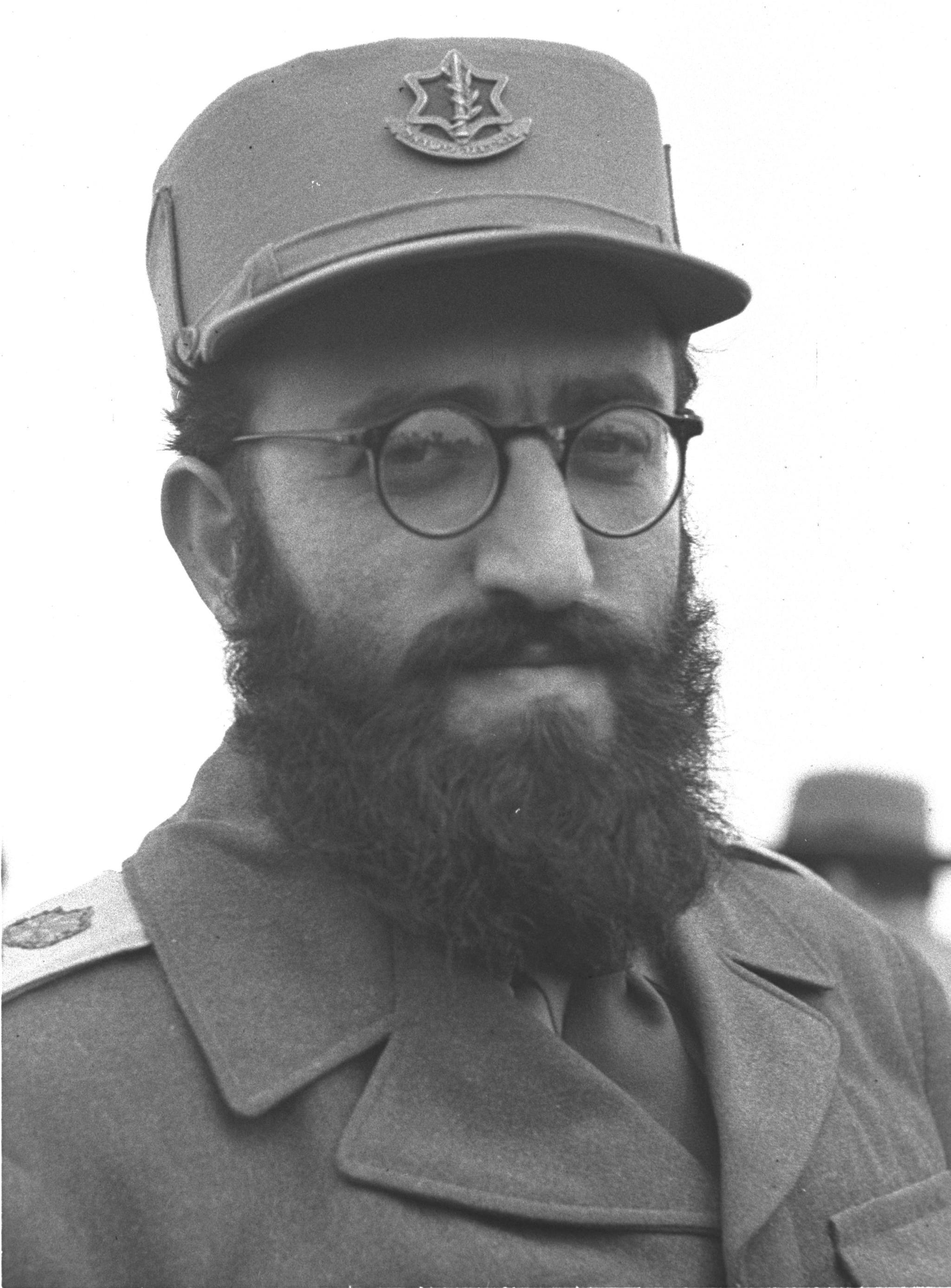
Rabbi Shlomo Goren, the first Chief Military Rabbi for the Israel Defense Force, and, later, Ashkenazi Chief Rabbi of Israel

The Military Rabbinate (Hebrew: חיל הרבנות הצבאית, Heil HaRabanut HaTzvait) is a corps in the Israel Defense Forces that provides religious services to soldiers, primarily to Jews, but also including non-Jews, and makes decisions on issues of religion and military affairs. The Military Rabbinate is headed by the Chief Military Rabbi, who is ranked a Brigadier General. The current Chief Military Rabbi is Eyal Krim.

== Mission ==
The Military Rabbinate constitutes the body responsible for religious institutions in the military. In every unit or military base, there are Military Rabbinate soldiers assigned responsibility for assuring religious services, in particular, Kashrut of the kitchen and the maintenance of the synagogue and its inventory. Actively serving soldiers can request from the Rabbinate representatives to perform marriage ceremonies as well as the Brit milah.

The Military Rabbinate is responsible for treating the bodies of soldiers from the Halakha standpoint, including the identification and post-mortem treatment of bodies, and conducting military funerals. The Military Rabbinate also attends to the burial of enemy soldiers and the exhuming in conjunction with prisoner exchanges. Prior to the establishment of ZAKA, it was also responsible for treating the victims of suicide attacks. More recently, it was placed in charge of dismantling the cemetery in Gush Katif during the Gaza disengagement plan.

== Inclusion of non-Jewish Soldiers ==
The Rabbinate is a solely Jewish organization, and does not employ Imams, Qadis, or Ministers for its non-Jewish soldiers, although soldiers of any religion can technically enlist in the Rabbinate. In the early 2000s, a bill was proposed in the Knesset that would obligate the Rabbinate to appoint non-Jewish chaplains after the Israeli-Palestinian community refused to conduct a funeral for fallen Muslim IDF soldier Halil Tahar, who was killed clearing a minefield in Shebaa Farms. The bill was not taken up, but the IDF committed to providing more services to non-Jewish soldiers.

The Rabbinate provides religious services, motivational talks, and inter-communal connection, as well as general chaplaincy services.

== History ==
The Military Rabbinate was founded in 1948 by Rabbi Shlomo Goren, who headed it until 1968. Until 2000, the Chief Military Rabbi tended to remain in their positions for a considerable period of time. After Rabbi Goren, from 1968 to 1977, the Chief Military Rabbi was Rabbi Mordechai Piron. From 1977 to 2000, the position was held by Rabbi Gad Navon. From 2000 to 2006, the Chief Military Rabbi was Rabbi Israel Weiss.

Weiss introduced many changes into the Rabbinate, including giving soldiers much more access to the unit and increasing the Rabbinate's dealings with the religious soldiers. Weiss was the chief rabbi during the 2005 disengagement from Gaza and was in charge of disinterring 48 graves from the Gush Katif cemetery. For that role, he has been criticized and attacked by opponents of the disengagement.

Succeeding him, Brigadier-General Rontzki began his service in the rabbinate on March 27, 2006. The appointment was recommended by the then-Chief of Staff, Dan Halutz, and approved by the then-Minister of Defense, Shaul Mofaz.

This new appointment was seen as a direct consequence of the controversial remarks by Israel Weiss wherein he appeared to have agreed with the former Chief Ashkenazi National Authority of Religious Services Rabbi, Avraham Shapira, who called on soldiers who are religious Jews to disobey orders to forcefully remove settlers from the Gaza Strip during the Gaza disengagement plan. While Israel Weiss retracted and apologized for the "slip up", the event drew a great deal of controversy in military circles, and in Israel in general.

According to Israeli left-wing human rights group Yesh Din, during the 2009 Gaza conflict, the military rabbinate distributed a religious booklet that warned against showing mercy to enemies. The publications compared modern-day Palestinians to the Biblical Philistines, and denied the historical existence of a Palestinian national identity. According to Yesh Din, the booklet could have been interpreted by soldiers as a call to act outside the confines of the international laws of warfare. A Haaretz editorial described the booklets as "sermons that preach, in the name of ostensibly religious values, the killing of civilians", and which "opposes all the combat values formulated in the IDF throughout the generations". The booklet includes sermons written by religious Zionist leader Shlomo Aviner. It also accuses the material of fostering an atmosphere in which extremist sermons by Yitzhak Ginsburg praising Baruch Goldstein (described as "chauvinist and racist incitement") can be disseminated. Following a series of inquiries, both in the Knesset and within the IDF, it was determined that the distribution of the alleged booklets took place in a few isolated incidents, by non-military personnel, without proper supervision of Military Rabbinate representatives. Following this incident, guidelines were set to ensure the authority of both the Military Rabbinate and the Education and Youth Corps within the IDF.

In November 2016, the High Court of Israel delayed the appointment of Eyal Krim as chief military rabbi, demanding that he clarify a number of statements he had made in the past. These allegedly included that Jewish soldiers were permitted to rape non-Jewish women in wartime, that women should not be allowed to testify in court due to their "sentimental" nature, and that captured terrorists should be killed. The comments were published over a decade ago. Responding to the accusations, Krim said that the Torah permits intercourse with a non-Jewish woman during wartime under certain conditions, but his statements were strictly theoretical and dealt with a specific biblical passage. At the time of his appointment, he told the IDF Personnel Directorate that "there is no license in times of peace or war to sexually assault women".

== Gallery ==
Military Rabbinate Corps flag

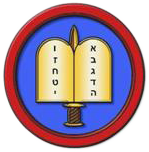
Military Rabbinate Corps pin

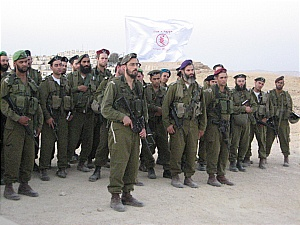
Military Rabbinate rabbis during training, Israel 2009

== See also ==
- Military chaplain#Israel
