= Mikveh Calendar =

The Laws of Family Purity (Taharat Hamishpacha) are quite complex. One of the components of these laws is to anticipate the upcoming period and intimately separate at that time. The purpose is to avoid intimacy at a time when a woman may become ritually impure due to the onset of her period. Most women will anticipate the onset of their period according to three methods:

1. The Hebrew day of the month their previous period began, i.e. if they began on the 17th of Tevet, the 17th of Shevat (Veset HaChodesh);
2. The Average 30-day Cycle (Onah Beinonit);
3. Cycle based on interval of time from one period to the next (Haflaga).

Jewish Law (Halahcha) mandates that only a Hebrew Calendar (luach) may be used to calculate these dates of anticipation and separation. This is imperative since the Hebrew day begins at sunset the evening before. Using a solar calendar, or secular calendar will yield inaccurate calculations.

Each calendar day is actually divided into two parts for the purposes of these calculations. These parts are called Onot (singular Onah) and each day consists of two Onot – night Onah and day Onah. The night onah begins at sunset and ends at sunrise and the day onah begins at sunrise and ends at sunset.

Therefore, on the Hebrew calendar, Monday actually begins at sunset Sunday afternoon and continues into Monday day, ending at sunset, which is then the beginning of Tuesday. Each of these days corresponds to a different date on the Hebrew calendar. It is these dates and these Onot, which are crucial in determining the correct dates and Onot when one is halachically (commanded by Jewish Law) required to abstain from marital intimacy in anticipation of the expected menses. These calculations also reveal the correct date for mikvah immersion after which marital intimacy may halachically resume.

This process of calculation is actually called keeping the Onas HaVeset (lit. time frames of menstruation) and is a very necessary part in the observance of the laws of Taharat Hamishpacha.

Throughout history, Jewish couples have been careful to calculate their Onas HaVeset via a paper calendar which was many times a complex process. In 2009, an internet based Mikvah Calendar, MikvahCalendar.com, transformed the way that Onas HaVeset are calculated by automating the process. In 2010, MikvahCalendar.com was translated into Hebrew, French, and Spanish. In 2012, MikvahCalendar.com released IPhone and Android Apps.
