= Eyal Krim =

Israeli rabbi, head of the IDF rabbinate

Eyal Moshe Krim
- אייל משה קרים
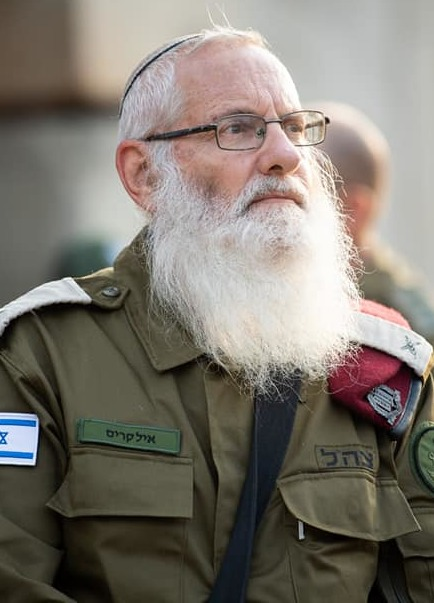
- Born: February 8, 1957 (age 69); Israel
- Military career
- Allegiance: Israel Defense Forces
- Service years: 1975—present
- Rank: Brigadier General
- Commands: Military Rabbinate

Eyal Moshe Krim (Hebrew: אייל משה קרים; born February 8, 1957) is the head of the Military Rabbinate of the Israel Defense Forces.

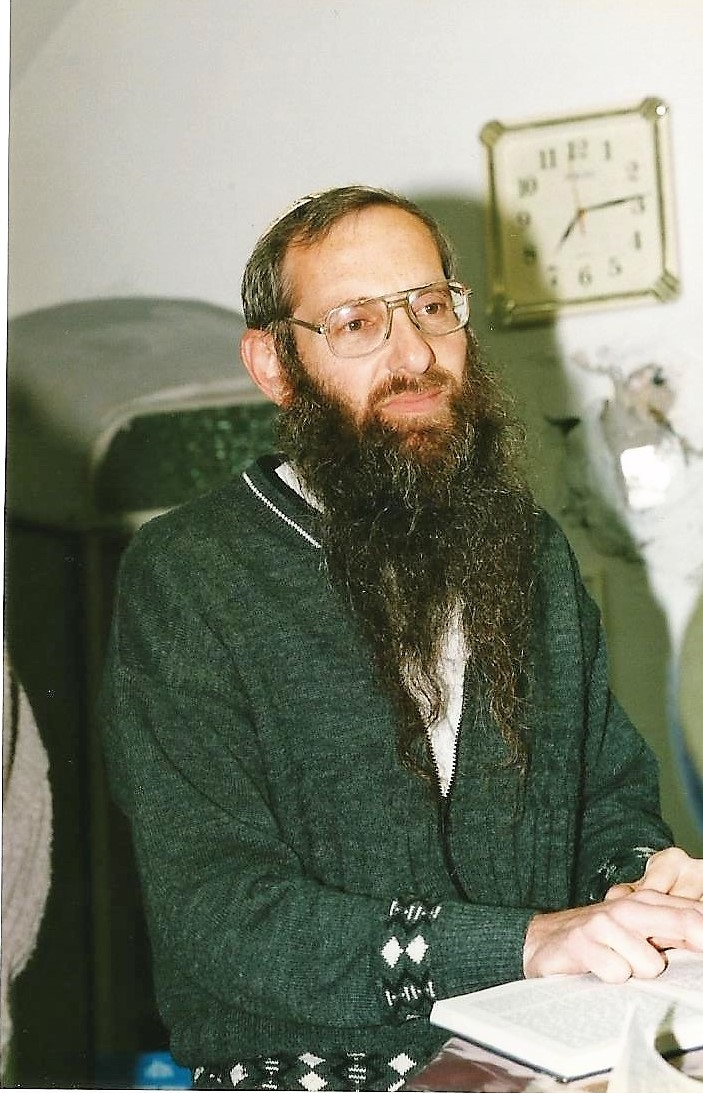
Rabbi Krim as head of Ateret Yerushalayim mechina, 1998

== Early life and career ==
Krim grew up in Givatayim, Israel, and studied at Yeshivat Bnei Akiva. In August 1975, after he was drafted into the IDF, he volunteered as a paratrooper in the Paratroopers Brigade, and in 1985 he became an infantry officer after completing Officer Candidate School. He served as a platoon leader in the 202 Paratroop Battalion, and as a company commander.

In 1981, he took leave of absence, and studied at the Mercaz HaRav yeshiva. After the Lebanon war, he served as commander of a detachment in the elite Sayeret Matkal unit. In 1983–1984, he served as commander of the paratroops. In 1985–2005, he served as a commander with the rank of lieutenant colonel in the Division of Fire in reserve.

From 1985 to 1994, he studied at Ateret Cohanim, where he was awarded rabbinic ordination. From 1995 to 1999, he taught in the pre-military academy (mechina) of the yeshiva. He was later appointed director of the mechina, a position that he held until 2004.

In 2006, he responded to the request of Rabbi Avichai Rontzki, Chief Rabbi of the IDF, to return to army service. Upon his return, he served as chair of Shiluv HaRa'uy committee charged with implementing the 2002 IDF integration order (of sexes and religions), and then as head of the Halacha section of the Military Rabbinate.

=== Appointment as Chief Rabbi of the IDF ===
In 2016, Krim was nominated to serve as the head of the Military Rabbinate of the IDF. The nomination was criticized over remarks made in 2002 in which Krim suggested that soldiers were allowed to rape Gentile women during wartime, and that women were forbidden from serving in the IDF. After the controversy, Krim clarified that his remarks about rape during wartime were somehow not meant to apply in the modern era. Meretz leader Zehava Gal-On said Krim was not "suitable" for the role because of these remarks. Yair Lapid said Krim should disavow his remarks, and that he should not be the chief military rabbi.

Later that year, more controversy arose after further comments from Krim were unearthed. Krim said women were inherently unreliable to give testimony in court, that gay people should be treated as "ill or disabled" individuals, and that Palestinian attackers should not be treated as human beings, but as "animals".

Gal-On, along with two fellow Meretz members of Knesset, brought a petition to the Supreme Court of Israel to prevent Krim's appointment. The court suspended Krim's appointment, and asked him to clarify his remarks.

In his defense to the court, Krim strenuously denied saying that soldiers were permitted to rape in wartime. "I never said, I never wrote, and I never thought that it is permitted for an IDF soldier to rape women during a war... Such action is totally forbidden."

Regarding comparing homosexuals to ill or disabled people, Krim said that he had sought to express "the obligation to love, support, and help" gay individuals, but he now admits that approach is wrong. He further said he now rejects the idea of homosexuals fighting their sexual orientation.

In November 2016, the Meretz MKs released a statement saying they accepted Krim's explanation, and withdrew their petition.

In December 2016, Krim was sworn in as IDF chief rabbi and awarded the rank of brigadier general.

== Personal life ==
Rabbi Krim is married, and the father of six.
