= Niddah =

Woman with status of ritual uncleanness during and after menstruation in Jewish law

Halakhic texts relating to this article
- Torah: Leviticus 15:19–30 Leviticus 18:19 Leviticus 20:18
- Babylonian Talmud: Niddah
- Mishneh Torah: Kedushah (Holiness): Issurei Biah (forbidden sexual relations): 4–11
- Shulchan Aruch: Yoreh De'ah 183–202

A niddah (alternative forms: nidda, nida, or nidah; Hebrew: נִדָּה nidá), in traditional Judaism, is a woman who has experienced a uterine discharge of blood (most commonly during menstruation), or a woman who has menstruated and not yet completed the associated requirement of immersion in a mikveh (ritual bath).

In the Book of Leviticus, the Torah prohibits sexual intercourse with a niddah. The prohibition has been maintained in traditional Jewish law and by the Samaritans. It has largely been rejected by adherents of Reform Judaism and other liberal branches.

In rabbinic Judaism, additional stringencies and prohibitions have accumulated over time, increasing the scope of various aspects of niddah, including: duration (12-day minimum for Ashkenazim, and 11 days for Sephardim); expanding the prohibition against sex to include: sleeping in adjoining beds, any physical contact, and even passing objects to spouse; and requiring a detailed ritual purification process.

Since the late 19th century, with the influence of German Modern Orthodoxy, the laws concerning niddah are also referred to as טָהֳרַת הַמִּשְׁפָּחָה, taharat haMishpacha, 'family purity'. This is a euphemism coined to de-emphasize the supposed impurity of women, a concept criticized by the Reform movement, and to exhort the masses by warning that niddah can have consequences for the purity of offspring.

== Etymology and usage ==
The word niddah means moved, expelled or and eliminated, and refers to the avoidance of menstruating women due to ritual impurity. Medieval Biblical commentator Abraham ibn Ezra writes that the word niddah is related to the term מנדיכם, menadechem, 'those that cast you out'.

The word niddah comes from the root ndd, "to make distant" (Aramaic Bible translations use the root rhq, "to be distant"), reflecting the physical banishment of menstruating women to separate quarters. Later in the biblical corpus, this meaning was extended to include concepts of sin and impurity, which may be related to ancient attitudes towards menstruation.

=== Hebrew Bible ===
The word niddah occurs 25 times in the Masoretic text of the Hebrew Bible. The majority of these uses refer to forms of uncleanliness in Leviticus. For example, in Leviticus, if a man takes his brother's wife, then that is "uncleanness", niddah. The five uses in Numbers all concern the red heifer ceremony (Numbers 19:1) and use the phrase mei niddah, "waters of separation". 2 Chronicles 29:5 includes the exhortation of Hezekiah to the Levites to carry the niddah, or "filth", possibly idols of his father Ahaz, out of the temple in Jerusalem. Usage in Ezekiel follows that of Leviticus. Finally, the Book of Zechariah concludes with an eschatological reference to washing Jerusalem: "In that day there shall be a fountain opened to the house of David and to the inhabitants of Jerusalem for sin (ḥaṭ'at) and for uncleanness (niddah)" (Zechariah 13:1).

=== Rabbinic injunctions ===
The copious laws of niddah contained in the Jewish rabbinic writings are almost entirely made-up of "fences" (Hebrew: סייגים), or safeguards, built around the Torah. The general rule which applies is that a woman is clean from the standpoint of the Torah until she feels uterine blood discharge from its source within her body. However, the rabbis have declared a woman to be unclean although she has not felt any discharge of blood, but has merely seen either a red or black blood stain on her body, or on her white garment or sheet, and which blood stain is larger in diameter than a fava bean (about 20 mm), in which case she must separate herself from her husband until she can complete seven clean days and can be purified in a ritual bath (mikveh). A blood stain that is a dark brown color leaning towards the color of coffee and the color of chestnuts defiles a woman and renders her niddah, on the condition that she feels its discharge. However, if she saw the same color while checking herself with an inspection cloth, but had not felt any discharge of blood, she is clean. Conversely, a vaginal discharge that is white in color, or either light yellow, green or blueish in color, does not render the woman niddah. There are, yet, many other conditions that need to be met, by rabbinic ordinances, in order to render uncleanness to a blood stain.

The daughters of Israel have behaved stringently with themselves, insofar that even if they should see a drop of blood as a mustard grain, they would wait over it seven days of cleanness

Although the Written Law (Leviticus 15:25–28) explicitly enjoins women to count seven days of cleanness when they have had irregular blood sightings occurring from the eighth day of the start of her regular period and ending with the conclusion of the eighteenth day), the Sages of Israel required all women who experienced even their regular and natural menses to count seven days of cleanness before they can be purified.

== Application of the Torah ==
The Leviticus description of niddah is essentially composed of two parts: the ritual purity (tumah and taharah) aspect and the prohibition of sexual intercourse aspect.

=== Ritual purity aspect ===
The Biblical regulations of Leviticus specify that a menstruating woman must "separate" for seven days (Leviticus 15:19). Any object she sits on or lies upon during this period becomes a "carrier of tumah" (midras uncleanness). One who comes into contact with her midras, or her, during this period becomes ritually impure (Leviticus 15:19–23) In addition, a man who has sexual relations with her is rendered ritually impure for seven days—as opposed to one day of impurity for coming into contact with her or her midras (Leviticus 15:24).

During a woman's menstrual cycle, she is still permitted to cook and bake for her husband, and to separate the dough-portion (Challah), but is restricted from arranging her husband's bed linen in his presence, from mingling his cup of wine with water, and from washing her husband's face, feet and hands, since these actions are thought to arouse affection. A niddah is also prohibited from passing objects directly unto her husband, from hand to hand, a rabbinic safeguard made to avoid physical contact, as it is prohibited unto the man to touch his wife during these days.

While the purity laws still exist in theory, in modern times there is generally no practical consequence to becoming impure (as, e.g., the Temple in Jerusalem cannot be visited), so the laws have no practical expression.

Some later rabbinic authorities encouraged (but did not require) avoiding the midras of the niddah, as a remembrance for diasporic Jews so as to not forget the purity laws. This encouragement was only for the biblically prescribed seven-day period, not for the latter days that were added as part of certain rabbinical stringencies. The Lubavitcher rabbi Menachem Mendel Schneerson discouraged abstaining from the midras of a niddah in modern times.

=== Sexual relations ===
Leviticus further prohibits sexual intercourse with a woman who is in her niddah state. "And to a woman in her (state of) niddah impurity you should not come close (with intent to) reveal her nudity" (Leviticus 18:19).

The Torah concludes by imposing the punishment of kareth on both individuals (man and woman) if the prohibition is violated (Leviticus 20:18) This issur (prohibition) component of physical relations with the niddah is considered in full effect and mandatory for all children of Israel.

== Practical laws ==
=== Terms and definitions ===
- Niddah, a woman who had become impure as a result of menstruation.
- Zavah, a woman who had become impure by a bloody uterine emission, deemed abnormal, in the sense that the emission had occurred during the timeframe of the 8th - 18th day, counting from the start of her last menstruation
- Mikveh, a ritual bath for immersion after the niddah period has ended.
- Vestot, days during which the woman is likely to see her menstrual flow
  - Onah Benonit, the 30th day after the beginning of previous menstruation
  - Veset HaChodesh, the same day of the Jewish month on which began the previous menstruation
  - Veset HaFlagah, the days (or half-days, per Chabad minhag) between menstruation
- Bedikah, cloth with which to check whether menstrual blood has finished
- Ben niddah (male) or bat niddah (female), a person conceived when their mother was niddah

=== Start of menstruation ===
According to rabbinical law, a woman becomes a niddah when she is aware that blood has come from her womb, whether it is due to menstruation, childbirth, sexually transmitted disease, or other reasons. If menstruation began before she sees evidence of it, the rabbinic regulations regard her as not being niddah until she notices. Until this point, the regulations do not come into force.

It is not necessary for the woman to witness the flow of blood itself; it is sufficient for her to notice a stain that has indications of having originated in her womb; bloodstains alone are inadequate without such evidence, for example, if she finds a stain just after cutting her finger, she does not become a niddah, as the blood is not obviously uterine. If she notices a bloodstain of uncertain origin, for example on her underclothing, there are a series of complicated criteria used by rabbinical law to determine whether she is niddah or not; the woman herself is not expected to know these criteria, and must seek the assistance of a rabbi.

=== Duration of niddah status ===
According to the Torah, the niddah period is 7 days; however, in Ashkenazi communities, the Rabbis added a stringency increasing the minimum duration period to 12 days. (See section "Seven days of cleanness" for differences in custom).

The Biblical definition of niddah is any blood emission occurring within seven days from the beginning of the menstrual period. After this seven-day period, the woman may immerse in the mikveh immediately (if she has stopped menstruating). Any blood found after these seven days is considered abnormal (zavah) blood and is subject to more stringent requirements, depending on the duration of said abnormal blood flow.

In the days of the Amoraim, because of possible confusion in determining when menstruation began and ended and hence whether blood was normal menstrual (niddah) or abnormal (zavah) blood, it became the accepted practice and practical halacha, that all women treat any emission as a continued abnormal flow (zavah gedolah—זבה גדולה), which requires counting seven abnormal-discharge-free days from the end of menstruation. This lengthening of the niddah period is known as Rabbi Zeira's stringency. According to contemporary Halacha these "seven clean days" must be observed.

=== Practices during niddah ===
In the Orthodox Jewish community, women may test whether menstruation has ceased; this ritual is known as the hefsek taharah. The woman takes a bath or shower near sunset, wraps a special cloth around her finger, and swipes the vaginal circumference. If the cloth shows only discharges that are white, yellow, or clear, then menstruation is considered to have ceased. If the discharge is red or pink, it indicates that menstruation continues. If it is any other color, like brown, it is subject to further inquiry, often involving consultation with a rabbi. The ritual requires that the cloth used to perform this test is first checked carefully to ensure that it is clean of any marks, colored threads, or specks; the cloth itself can be any clean white cloth, although there are small cloths designed for this ritual known as bedikah cloths, meaning "checking".

In the Orthodox Jewish community, further rituals are practiced toward assurance regarding the cessation of the menstrual flow. After the hefsek taharah, some women insert a cloth (or, in modern times, a tampon), consequently known as a moch dachuk, for between 18 minutes and an hour, to ensure that there is no blood; this must be done carefully, as it could otherwise irritate the mucous membrane, causing bleeding unrelated to menstruation. If there is any fear of irritation causing bleeding, a rabbi may waive this practice.

The "bedikah" is repeated each morning and evening of the seven days after the end of menstruation. Another tradition is the wearing of white underwear and use of white bedding during this period; conversely, the rest of the time, when not counting the "seven clean days", some women who suffer from spotting deliberately use coloured underwear and colored toilet paper, since it is only when blood is seen on white material that it has any legal status in Jewish law. When not during their seven "clean" days, all women are advised to wear colored undergarments, for this reason. It is furthermore strongly recommended that women make an effort to refrain from looking at the toilet paper after wiping to avoid possible resultant questions.

=== Physical contact during niddah ===
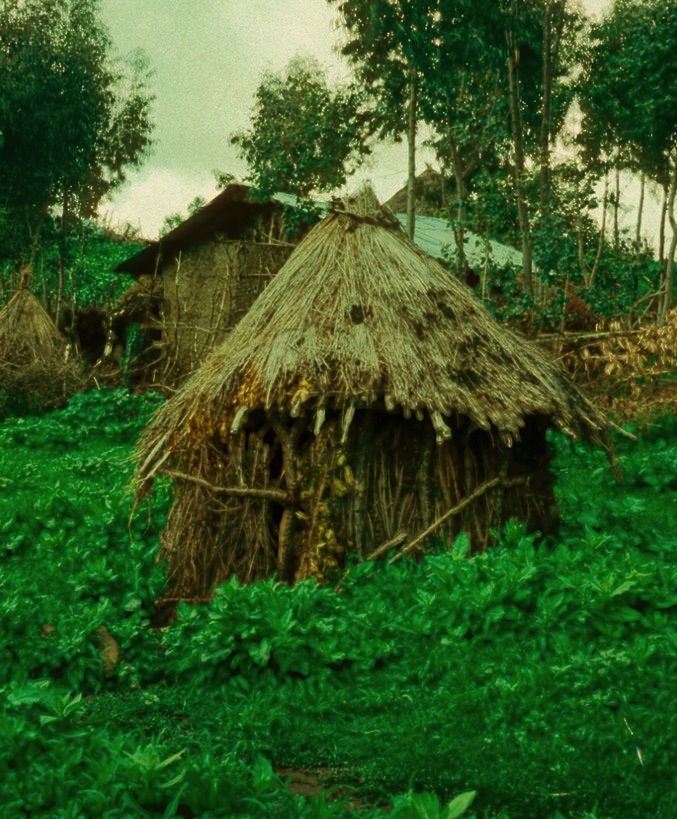
A niddah hut (Mergem Gogo) at the Jewish village of Ambober in northern Ethiopia, 1976.

As with most forbidden relationships in Judaism, all physical contact in an affectionate or lustful manner is rabbinically forbidden when a woman is in her niddah status. Such contact is forbidden whether or not the man and woman are husband and wife.

In the case of husband and wife, however, the sages added on extra restrictions, including touch that is not in an affectionate or lustful manner, passing of objects even without touching, and sleeping in the same bed; these restrictions are to avoid the risk of leading to sexual contact. These laws are termed harchakot, meaning "the laws of separation," and imply the prohibitive rules regulating the passing of objects from hand to hand, as well as to taking distinctive measures used to remind them of their separation, such as placing some object at the dinner table which is not ordinarily placed there. The laws of separation (harchakot) are derived from a biblical command: "You shall not approach a woman to uncover her nakedness so long as she is separated for her [menstrual] uncleanness" (Leviticus 18:19). Some have suggested that by physically distancing oneself from his spouse there is an enhanced need for relationships to develop in non-physical ways, such as emotional and spiritual connections.

=== Seven days of cleanness ===
When blood from a menstruant (niddah) has ceased altogether, shortly before sunset she performs on herself a "cessation of uncleanness", known by its Hebrew euphemism hefseq be-ṭaharah (הפסק בטהרה = lit. "cessation of purification"), during which time she checks herself to verify that all uterine bleeding has indeed stopped. This is done by bathing, and, afterwards, inserting a clean piece of white cotton or linen cloth within her vagina and examining it after swiping the area inside, followed by leaving in that place a snugly fitting cotton wad for the duration of about 20 minutes (preferably during the evening twilight). When there are no signs of blood, the woman begins counting seven days of cleanness on the following day, during which seven days she is still prohibited to have any physical contact with her husband. During each of the seven days, the woman checks herself once in the morning and once in the evening, by using a soft and white, absorbent cotton cloth.

In Sephardic Jewish tradition, a woman who has had no physical contact with her husband within the 72 hr. period (3 days) prior to the start of her menstruation, she is permitted to immediately conduct the hefseq be-ṭaharah (see supra) after all uterine bleeding has stopped, and, on the following day, she begins to count seven days of cleanness, which culminate in an immersion. Differences in custom, however, exist between the Ashkenazim and the Sephardic Jewish communities as to when to begin the counting of seven days of cleanness if she cohabited with her husband within those 72 hours (three days) prior to her seeing blood.

- Ashkenazim: According to the halachic ruling of Moses Isserles, in all cases, whether a woman cohabited with her husband within the past 72 hours or did not cohabit with her husband, whether the woman saw blood for only 2 or 3 days, or merely a blood stain, she cannot begin to count seven days of cleanness until 5 days have passed from the time that she started seeing blood, and only then does she proceed to count seven days of cleanness. For example, if she first saw blood on a Sunday, she can begin her hefseq be-ṭaharah (see supra) on a Thursday (assuming the bleeding has stopped), and then on a Friday to start her first day of seven days of cleanness. These days are not to be interrupted by any blood sighting in-between, and after concluding these seven clean days, she immerses herself in a ritual bath (mikveh) on that coming night. At this time she is no longer a menstruant, but is deemed clean, and she is permitted unto her husband.
- Sephardic Jews: For Jews that largely hail from North Africa, Spain, Turkey, and the Middle East (including Iran), they will usually follow the practice of the Shulhan Arukh, which is to wait 4 days from the time the couple last cohabited together (i.e. last time in which they engaged in sexual intercourse) before she begins to count seven days of cleanness. This will allow for the discharge of semen from her body that is suspected of having been mixed with the blood of her menstruation. For example, if the couple last cohabited on a Saturday, and she then saw blood on a Sunday, she can begin her hefseq be-ṭaharah (see supra) on a Tuesday (on the condition that all blood has stopped), and then on a Wednesday to start her first day of seven days of cleanness. These days are not to be interrupted by any blood sighting in-between, and after concluding these seven clean days, she immerses herself in a ritual bath (mikveh) on that coming night. At this time she is no longer a menstruant, but is deemed clean, and she is permitted unto her husband.

For the Sephardic Jewish community, waiting four days before beginning to count seven days of cleanness only refers to when there were conjugal affairs between a man and his wife, leading up to her menstrual period. If, however, there was no sexual intercourse between the couple in the days leading up to her menstrual cycle, and, subsequently, there was no fear of her body discharging of her husband's copulative seed that had been mixed with her menstrual blood, there is no need for her to wait four days, but she may presently begin her hefseq be-ṭaharah (see supra), followed by counting seven days of cleanness. Another factor used to determine when to begin the counting of seven clean days (among Sephardic Jews) is that, had the woman merely found on her an unclean blood stain (where there was no sensation of any active blood flow), after concluding that all such sightings have stopped, she can begin to count seven days of cleanness after two days have passed since the last time she cohabited with her husband. However, among Ashkenazim, even if a woman merely saw an unclean blood stain, when the blood has ceased to appear, she waits 5 days before beginning to count her seven days of cleanness.

Maimonides mentions a former custom where the menstruants of some Jewish communities would wait a standard 7 days before beginning to count seven days of cleanness, even if the woman had seen blood for only one or two days. This custom, though widely practised in the 20th century among the Jews of Yemen, Djerba, parts of Morocco, as also with a few families in Baghdad, was later rejected and abandoned by many, as Maimonides calls it an errant practice.

=== Niddah and fertility ===
Because the night that the woman ritually traditionally immerses is about 12 days after menstruation began, it often coincides with a woman's ovulation, and thus improves the chances of successful conception if sexual relations occur on that night. However, for certain women, this period extends far past the date of ovulation, and in combination with the ban on sexual relations during the niddah state, effectively results in the woman being unable to conceive, a situation sometimes called "halachic infertility". In the case of this effective infertility, rabbis try on a case-by-case basis to relax halakhic strictures in order to facilitate conception. There have been some calls within Orthodox Judaism for the custom to be modified so that the time between the end of menstruation and the end of niddah is shorter for these women. Another suggestion is to take hormone tablets to lengthen the ovulation cycle.

=== Checking by bedikah ===
The bedikah cloth or "checking cloth", called an eid ["witness"] in Hebrew, is a clean piece of white cloth used in the process of purifying a niddah. It is used by observant Jewish women to determine whether they have finished menstruation. The cloth is inserted into the vagina, and if no blood is found, the woman may start counting the seven blood-free days. On each of these days, she performs this examination in the morning and in the later afternoon before sunset. If no blood is found, she may go to the mikveh on the eighth evening after nightfall, and then engage in intercourse with her husband. Such cloths are about two by four inches, and are available at local Judaica stores, the local mikveh, stores in Orthodox neighborhoods in Israel, or may be cut from clean all-white soft cotton or linen fabric.

This practice is also occasionally used by Jewish men to check if he has gotten blood on himself from his wife after intercourse to determine whether she menstruated during intercourse.

=== Immersion in water ===
After a woman has counted seven days of cleanness (see supra), she is then required to immerse in a ritual bath (mikveh) that has been constructed in accordance with the Jewish laws of ritual purity. After concluding her seven days of cleanness, she is not allowed to immerse during the daytime, even on the eighth or ninth days, because of a rule introduced on account of her daughter's immersion (Hebrew: סרך בתה) and which was enacted for the sake of conformity, so that the daughter will not see her mother immerse during the daytime and wrongly presume that it was her mother's seventh day of counting, and think that it was alright to immerse on the seventh day before nightfall, without realizing that her mother had already concluded her seven clean days. This enactment, therefore, was to prevent an occasion for miscalculation and stumbling. Even if a woman has no daughter, this rule of immersing only in the night still applies, as the Sages did not make any distinction, but have prohibited all women from immersing themselves during daylight hours of the eighth day, or of any day. Under extenuating circumstances, however, the rabbis have also permitted to immerse in the day, after fully completing seven days of cleanness.

There are differing customs about how many immersions are performed at each visit to a mikveh. It is the custom of many in the Orthodox community to immerse at least twice. Accordingly, they would immerse, recite the blessing, then immerse again. The other opinion states that like other commandments, here too the blessing should be recited before performing the commandment.

Immediate preparation for a mikveh includes a bath or shower wherein every part of the body (including the ears and underneath the nails) is thoroughly washed; plus other routine hygiene practices which include trimming fingernails and toenails, brushing and flossing the teeth, and combing the hair. Prior to every immersion, the woman is required to inspect herself to make sure that there is nothing clinging to her skin and hair that would obstruct the water from making contact with it during her actual immersion, or what is known as ḥaṣīṣah = "interposing objects" (e.g. clay, dough, paint, gum resin, etc.). At the mikveh itself, a female attendant is present to make certain that the woman immerses herself fully, including her hairs. Though that is the attendant's foremost duty, she may also help by checking a woman's back or answer questions regarding proper ritual protocol.

=== Refrainment from relations on days that menstruation is expected to begin ===
The classical regulations also forbid sexual relations on the day that a woman expects to start menstruating. Generally speaking, there are three days that fall under this regulation, known as the veset, namely the same day of the month, (according to the Hebrew calendar), as her previous menstruation began; the day exactly 30 days after the previous menstruation started; and the day that is of equal distance from the day of her previous menstruation as the menstruation before the last. For instance: If the interval between her last two periods was 28 days - the couple must refrain from sexual relations on the 28th day. According to most Orthodox authorities, this is measured from the beginning of the former period to the beginning of the latter. Yet some authorities, especially in Chabbad circles, rule that this is measured from the end of the preceding menstruation to the beginning of the following one.

If the woman is not actually menstruating during a veset day, then there are certain circumstances wherein sexual activity is permitted according to most authorities, for example, if a woman's husband is about to travel, and will return only after menstruation has begun.

=== Newlyweds ===
According to all Orthodox authorities, the first time a virgin has intercourse, she also becomes niddah as a result of her hymenal blood flow (Hebrew: דם בתולים, romanized: dam betulim, lit. 'virginal blood'). However, a bride observes only four days of hefsek taharah (Hebrew: הפסק טהרה, lit. 'pause of purity'), instead of the usual five. The woman performs hefsek taharah by checking to make sure that all bleeding has stopped by inserting a piece of white cloth into her vagina and having it come out free of blood, in order to begin on the following day her seven days of cleanness. Traditionally, this pause is observed even if no blood is discovered, though some Conservative authorities have ruled that a woman is not a niddah in such a case unless bleeding is observed.

=== Privacy of the niddah process ===
Out of tzniut (Hebrew for "modesty"), many Orthodox Jews and some Conservative Jews follow a custom of keeping their times of niddah secret from the general public.

== Conservative Judaism ==
Conservative Judaism authorities teach that the laws of family purity are normative and still in force, including the requirement to refrain from sexual relations during niddah, yet there is a difference of opinions over how much other strictures need to be observed, such as whether there should be complete prohibition on any touching during niddah and whether women are required to count seven "clean" days before immersing in the mikveh.

The majority of orthodox rabbis contend that the seven days of cleanness still apply to all menstruant women today, even though it is only a rabbinic injunction. According to two lesser opinions representing the movement of Conservative Judaism, one by Grossman and the other by Reisner, whose views are not shared by orthodox Jewish circles, the "seven clean days" need not be observed today and women may immerse and resume sexual relations after seven days from the beginning of menstruation, or after its cessation, if it lasts longer than seven days. Grossman and Berkowitz ruled that women may rely on their own discretion about when menstruation has ended, and need not routinely engage in bedikah as described above.

Despite the official stance, the practices related to family purity have often not been widely followed only by Conservative Jews. However, in an issue of the United Synagogue Review that focused on issues of mikvah and niddah (published in conjunction with the passing of the responsa mentioned above, in Fall/Winter 2006), Rabbi Myron S. Geller, a member of the Committee on Jewish Law and Standards, wrote about an upswing in the observance of the laws of family purity within the Conservative Jewish community:

Conservative Judaism has largely ignored this practice in the past, but recently has begun to reevaluate its silence in this area and to consider the spiritual implications of mikvah immersion for human sexuality and for women.

== Reform Judaism ==
Reform Judaism and other liberal denominations have largely rejected many of the rituals and prohibitions associated with menstruation, particularly the use of a mikveh.

== See also ==
- Culture and menstruation
- Jewish male menstruation
- Jewish views on marriage
- Menstruation hut
- Mikveh Calendar
- Negiah (guidelines for physical contact)
- Niddah (Talmud)
- Role of women in Judaism
- Women in Judaism
- Yoetzet Halacha

== Bibliography ==
- Badiḥi, Yiḥya (2011). Yosef Ḥen (ed.). Ḥen Ṭov (in Hebrew). Bene Berak: Nosaḥ Teman. pp. 164–170 (responsum no. 41–beth). OCLC 768305430.
- Botterweck, G Johannes; Ringgren, Helmer, eds. (1999). Theological Dictionary of the Old Testament. Vol. 4. Grand Rapids, Mich.: Wm. B. Eerdmans. OCLC 838020993.
- Cohen, Alfred S. (1984). Halacha and Contemporary Society. KTAV Publishing House. ISBN 9780881250428.
- Ivry, Tsipy (2013). "Halachic infertility: rabbis, doctors, and the struggle over professional boundaries". Medical Anthropology. 32 (3): 208–226. doi:10.1080/01459740.2012.674992. PMID 23557006. S2CID 42649279.
- Jacobs, F. (2000). Family Purity: A Guide to Marital Fulfillment. South Royalton, Vt.: Campus Living and Learning. ISBN 9780967348193. OCLC 48004626.
- Klein, George L.; Clendenen, Ray (2008). Zechariah. New American Commentary. Nashville, Tenn.: B & H Pub. Group. ISBN 978-0-8054-9494-5. OCLC 767571192.
- Knohl, Elyashiv (2014). Husband and wife (Jewish law) [Ish ṿe-ishah: zakhu shekhinah benehem] (איש ואשה - זכו שכינה ביניהם) (in Hebrew) (3 ed.). ʻEn Tsurim - Lod: Makhon Shiluvim. Yeshivat ha-Ḳibuts ha-dati. ISBN 9789659053902. OCLC 57630665. (first edition: 2003)
- Maimonides (1974). Sefer Mishneh Torah - HaYad Ha-Chazakah (Maimonides' Code of Jewish Law) (in Hebrew). Vol. 3. Jerusalem: Pe'er HaTorah. OCLC 122758200., s.v. Hil. Issurei Bi'ah
- Marienberg, Evyatar (2013). "Traditional Jewish Sexual Practices and Their Possible Impact on Jewish Fertility and Demography" (PDF). Harvard Theological Review. 106 (3): 243–286. doi:10.1017/S0017816013000114. S2CID 162725107.
- Ratsabi, Yitshak [in Hebrew], ed. (1992). "Shaʻarei Ṭaharah". Sefer Pisḳe Maharits (with the commentary Beʼerot Yitsḥaḳ) (in Hebrew). Vol. 3. Bnei Brak: Mekhon Peʻulat tsadiḳ. OCLC 30156998., Hil. Niddah and Miqwa'ot
- Reisner, Avram (2006), Observing Niddah in Our Day, Committee on Jewish Law and Standards, Rabbinical Assembly
- Sternbuch, M. (1992–1997). The Complete Responsa and Practices of Moshe Sternbuch [Teshuvos VeHanhagos] (שו"ת תשובות והנהגות השלם ) (in Hebrew). Vol. 4. Jerusalem: Sternbuch. OCLC 762395952.
- Teherani, David (2019). Sefer Ma'ayan Ṭaharah Hashalem (The Complete Book 'Wellspring of Purification') (in Hebrew) (2 ed.). Betar Ilit: Beit ha-hora'ah de-kahal kadosh sepharadim. OCLC 232673878.
- Yisrael Meir ha-Kohen (1971). "Maʼamar ṭohorat ha-mishpaḥah". Sefer Geder ʻOlam (in Hebrew). Israel: Sifrei Chofetz Chaim. (reprinted in 1974 by Eshkol publishers, Jerusalem OCLC 816512380)
- Yosef, O. (1986–1995). Responsa Yabia' Omer (Sefer Sheʼelot u-teshuvot Yabiʻa omer) (in Hebrew). Vol. 5. Jerusalem: Meʼor Yiśraʼel. OCLC 503662216.
- Yosef, O. (2018). Sefer Ṭohorat ha-bayit (in Hebrew). Vol. 1–3. Jerusalem: Meʼor Yiśraʼel. OCLC 20658501.
