= Gad Navon =

Israeli Chief Military Rabbi (1922–2006)

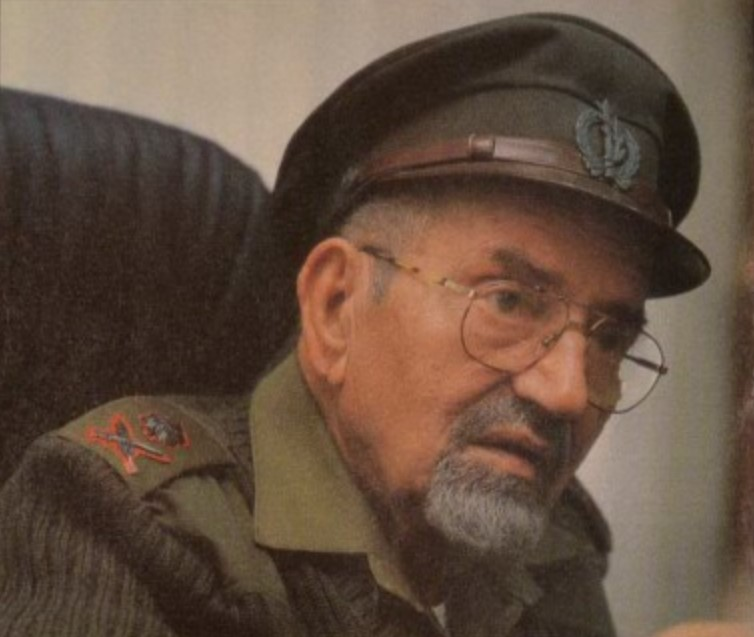
Gad Navon

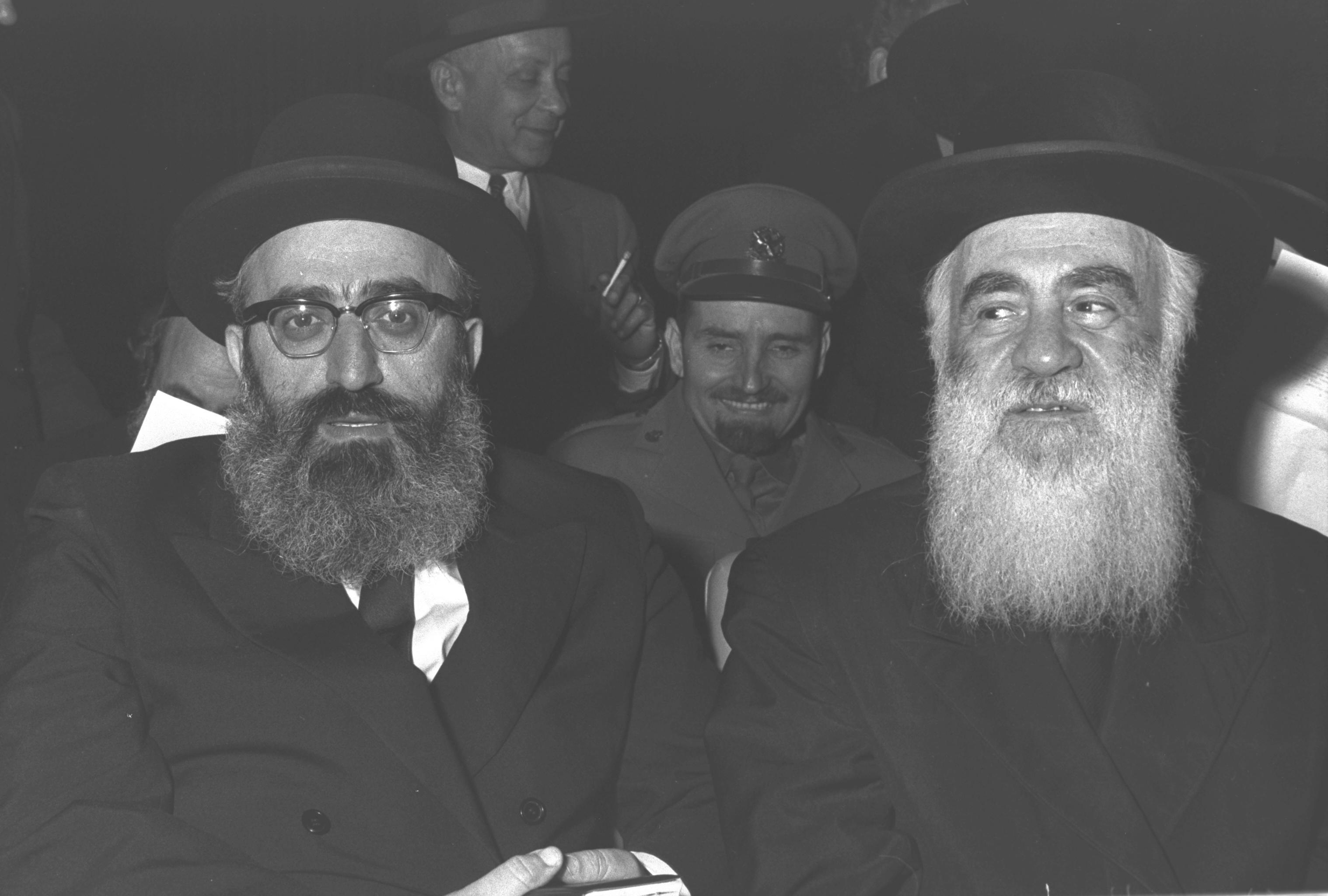
Rabbi Gad Navon, sitting behind rabbis Shlomo Goren and Yehoshua Kaniel, 1964

Gad Navon (1922 – 25 June 2006) was the third Chief Military Rabbi of the Israel Defense Forces.

== Biography ==
Mimun Fahima (later Gad Navon) was born in Morocco. He was ordained there as Rabbi after completing the study of the entire Talmud. He participated in the illegal immigration of Jews to Palestine in defiance of the British colonial government and was sent to France on behalf of the Zionist movement. He immigrated to Israel in 1948, served as a fighter of the Negev Brigade of the Palmach and was appointed chaplain in the brigade.

== Rabbinic and military career ==
In 1950, he was appointed chaplain of the Southern Command and afterward of the Northern Command. In 1965, he served as a member of a military tribunal headed by Rabbi Shlomo Goren. During the Six-Day War, he was the chaplain of the Northern Command, holding the rank of lieutenant colonel. In June 1971, with the retirement of Major-General Rabbi Shlomo Goren, he was appointed deputy to Chief Military Rabbi Mordechai Peron and promoted to brigadier general.

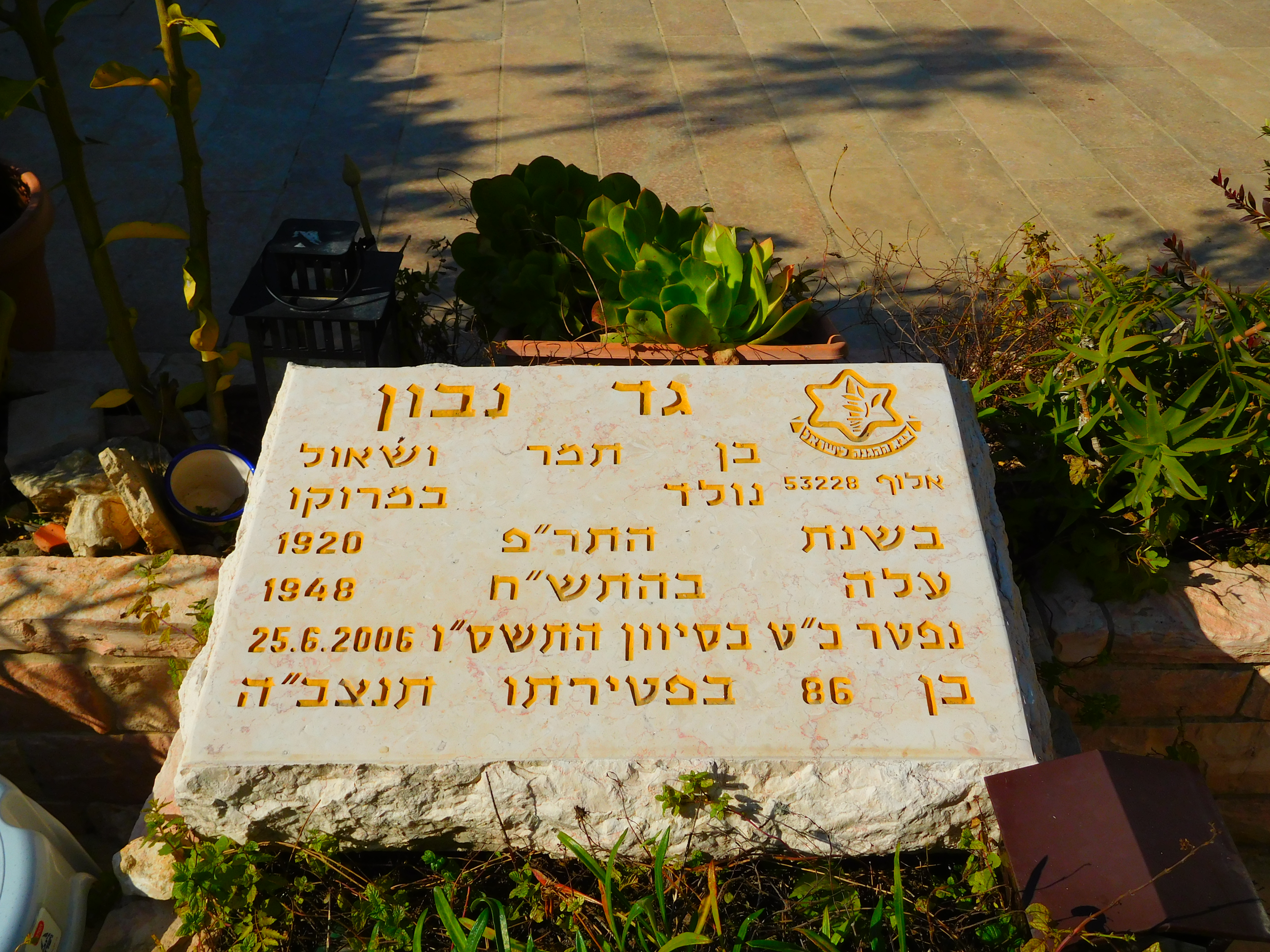
Gravesite of Rabbi Gad Navon, Mount Herzl

In February 1977, he was appointed the third Chief Military Rabbi and promoted to major general. During his tenure, there was a gradual transition of military chaplains from being religious officers, to being military rabbis. He also founded the military rabbinical course; and in addition to the standard sergeant chaplain present in every reserve battalion, he appointed a military rabbi at the battalion level.

Rabbi Navon published Halachic papers on the issue of identification of fallen soldiers, and during his tenure, technological means of identification were given more credibility. He served as Chief Military Rabbi until May 2000.

He was a member of the Moriah Institute in the organization of the Freemasons. He died at age 84 and was buried in the Mount Herzl military cemetery.
