= Shlomo Goren =

Polish-born Israeli rabbi (1917–1994)

Rabbi Shlomo Goren
- שלמה גורן
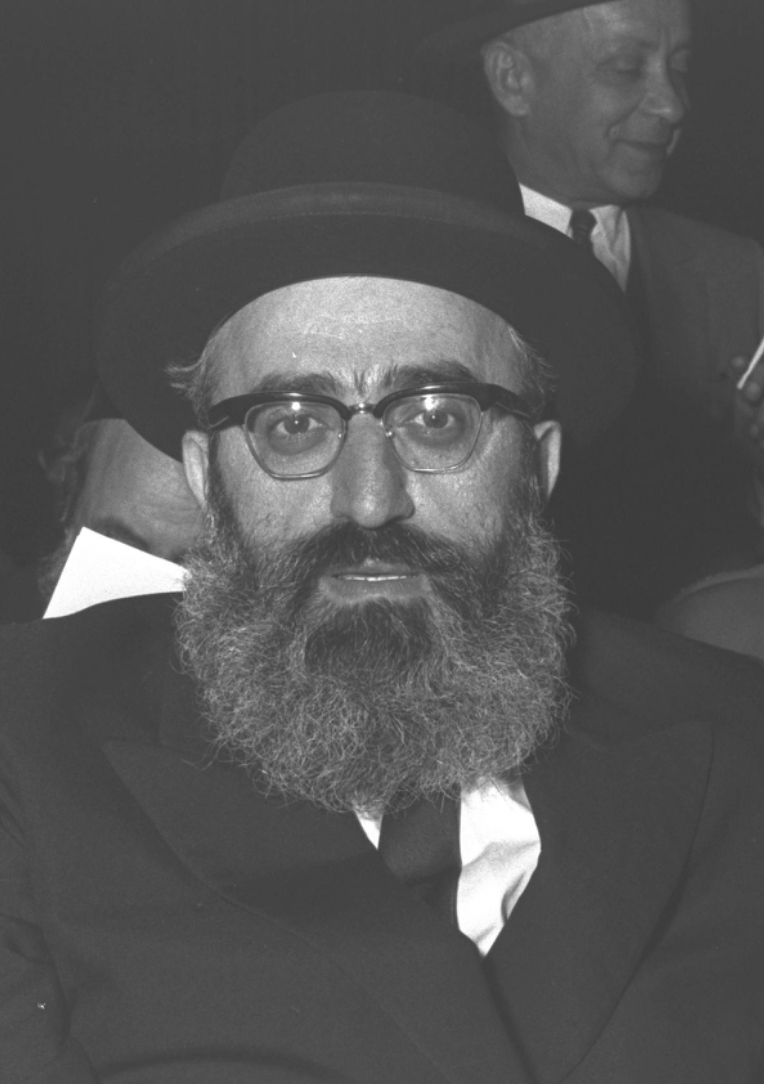
- Goren in 1964

Personal life
- Born: 3 February 1918 Zambrów, Government General of Warsaw, German Empire
- Died: 29 October 1994 (aged 76) Tel Aviv, Israel
- Spouse: Tzfia Cohen (m. 1945)
- Children: 3
- Education: Hebrew University of Jerusalem
- Occupation: Chief of the Military Rabbinate (1948–1968); Chief Rabbi of Israel (1973–1983)
- Military career
- Allegiance: State of Israel
- Branch: Haganah (1936–1948); Israel Defense Forces (1948–1968)
- Service years: 1936–1968
- Rank: Aluf
- Conflicts: Arab–Jewish conflict in Palestine; 1947–1949 Palestine War; Arab–Israeli conflict; 1948 Arab–Israeli War; 1956 Arab–Israeli War; 1967 Arab–Israeli War

Religious life
- Religion: Judaism

Shlomo Goren (Hebrew: שלמה גורן; 3 February 1918 – 29 October 1994) was a Polish-born Israeli rabbi and Talmudic scholar. An Orthodox Jew and Religious Zionist, he was considered a foremost rabbinical legal authority on matters of Jewish religious law (halakha). In 1948, Goren founded and served as the first head of the Military Rabbinate of the Israel Defense Forces (IDF), a position he held until 1968. Subsequently, he served as Chief Rabbi of Tel Aviv–Jaffa between 1968 and his 1972 election as the Chief Rabbi of Israel; the fourth Ashkenazi Jew to hold office. After his 1983 retirement from the country's Chief Rabbinate, Goren served as the head of a yeshiva that he established in Jerusalem.

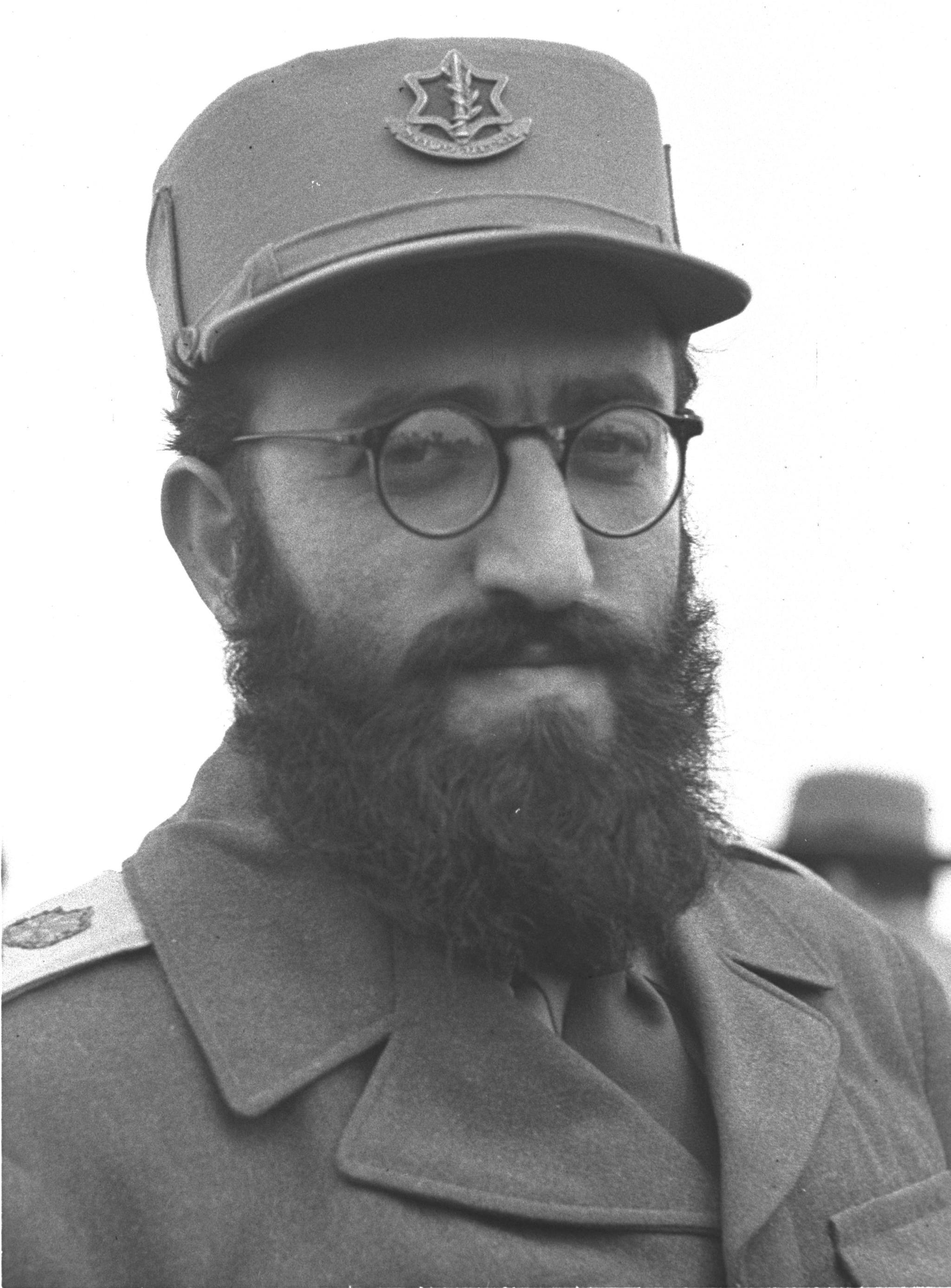
Goren in 1949

While serving in the IDF Goren fought in three of the Arab–Israeli wars, and wrote several award-winning books on halakha.

== Early life and education ==
Goren was born into an Orthodox Ashkenazi Jewish family in the town of Zambrów, Poland. His parents, Avraham Goronczik and Haya Tzipora, emigrated in 1925 to join the Yishuv in what was then the British Mandate for Palestine. His family was among the founders of Kfar Hasidim, an Orthodox Jewish village located near the city of Haifa, where Goren grew up.

As a young boy, he was sent to Jerusalem to study at the Etz Chaim Yeshiva. Later, when he was 12, he became the youngest student to enter the Hebron Yeshiva, where he was identified as a Judaic prodigy. His first book, dealing with korbanot (ritual sacrifices) at the former Temple in Jerusalem, was published when he was 17. At the same age, he received rabbinic ordination.

From 1940 until 1944, Goren was enrolled at the Hebrew University of Jerusalem, where he studied philosophy, mathematics, and classics.

== Military career ==
Goren (left) saluting at the grave of Israeli soldier Uri Ilan, 1955

He volunteered for the Haganah in 1936, and was a chaplain for the Jerusalem area following the outbreak of the 1948 Arab–Israeli War, during which he tested for and qualified as an IDF paratrooper. Goren was also a chaplain of the Carmeli Brigade at this time.

Following Israel's independence, Goren was appointed as the head of the IDF's Military Rabbinate with the rank of major-general, a position he held until 1968. He used the opportunity to help establish and organize the military chaplaincy's framework, streamlining processes to get soldiers accommodations for kosher food and prayer services. Goren personally wrote a new prayerbook to accommodate the different prayer styles used by various Jewish ethnic subgroups serving in the IDF.

In October 1949, Goren was given permission by Jordanian officials to search the site of the four destroyed Gush Etzion communities in the aftermath of the May 1948 Kfar Etzion massacre. His investigation of the site located many bodies that had not been properly buried, despite the claims of Arab officials that they had been interred three days after the conclusion of the battle. An estimated half of the 100,000 Jewish residents of Jerusalem lined the path of the procession on November 17, 1949, in which the bodies of the victims were buried in a common grave on Mount Herzl, nearly 18 months after they had been killed by Arab forces.

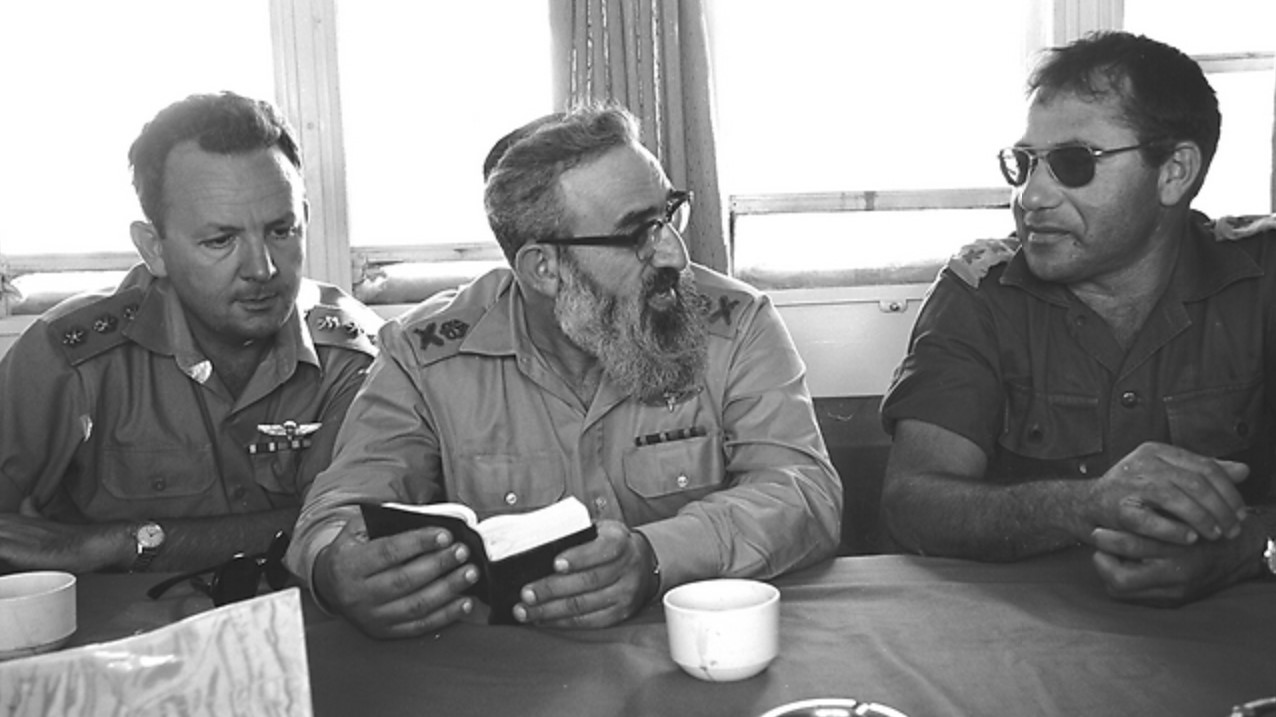
Goren (center) in 1967

Goren served in the Suez Crisis of 1956 and the Six-Day War of 1967, following which he was promoted to the rank of general. On 7 June 1967, when Israeli troops captured East Jerusalem from Jordanian control, Goren gave a prayer of thanksgiving, which was broadcast live to the entire country. Shortly afterwards, blowing a shofar and carrying a Torah scroll, he held the first Jewish prayer session at the Western Wall since 1948. The event was one of the defining moments of the Arab–Israeli conflict, and several photographs of Goren surrounded by soldiers in prayer have since become famous among Jews in Israel and worldwide. The most famous of these photographs shows Goren blowing the shofar against the background of the Western Wall.

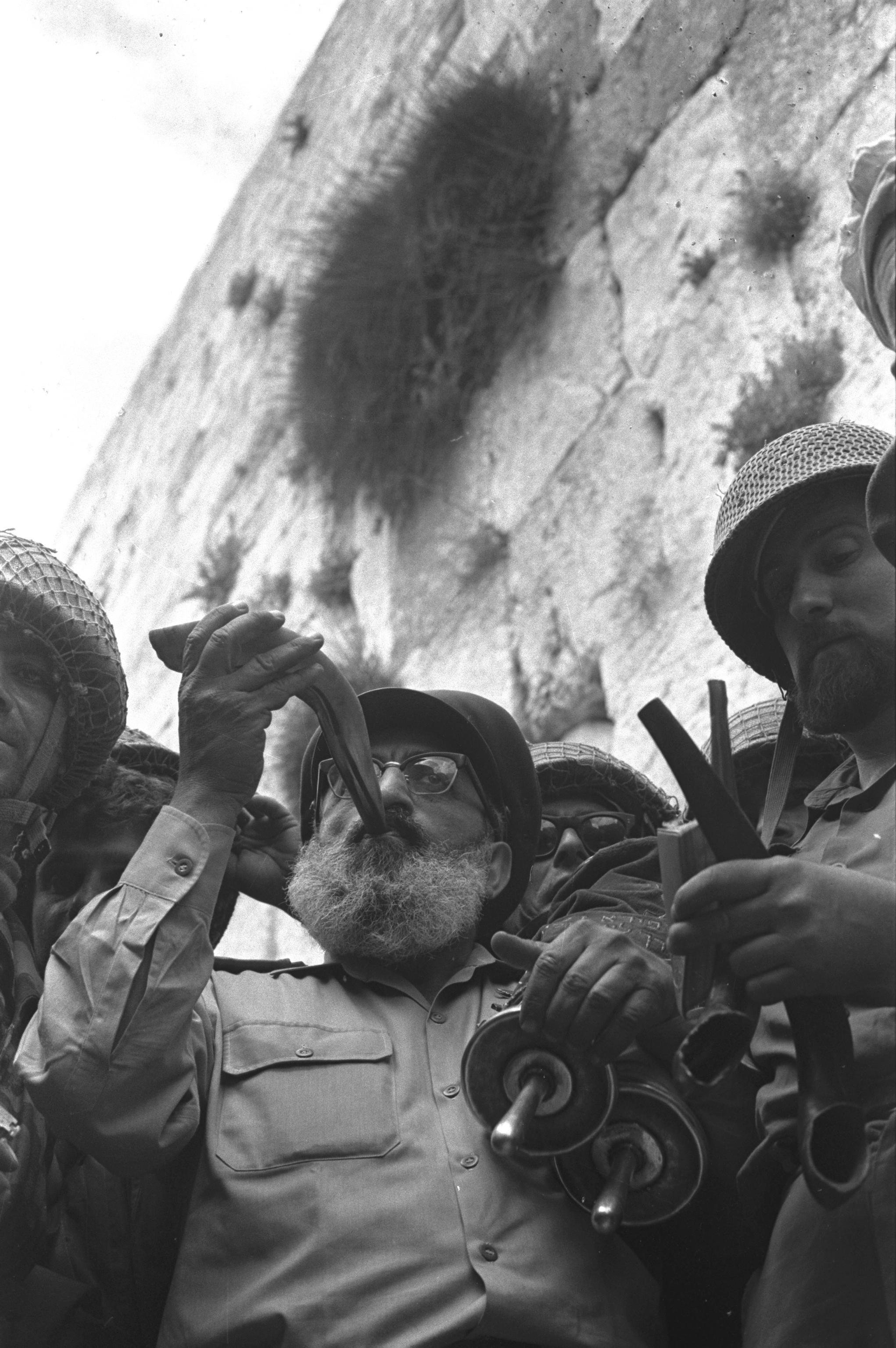
Goren’s Six-Day War photo

== Controversies ==
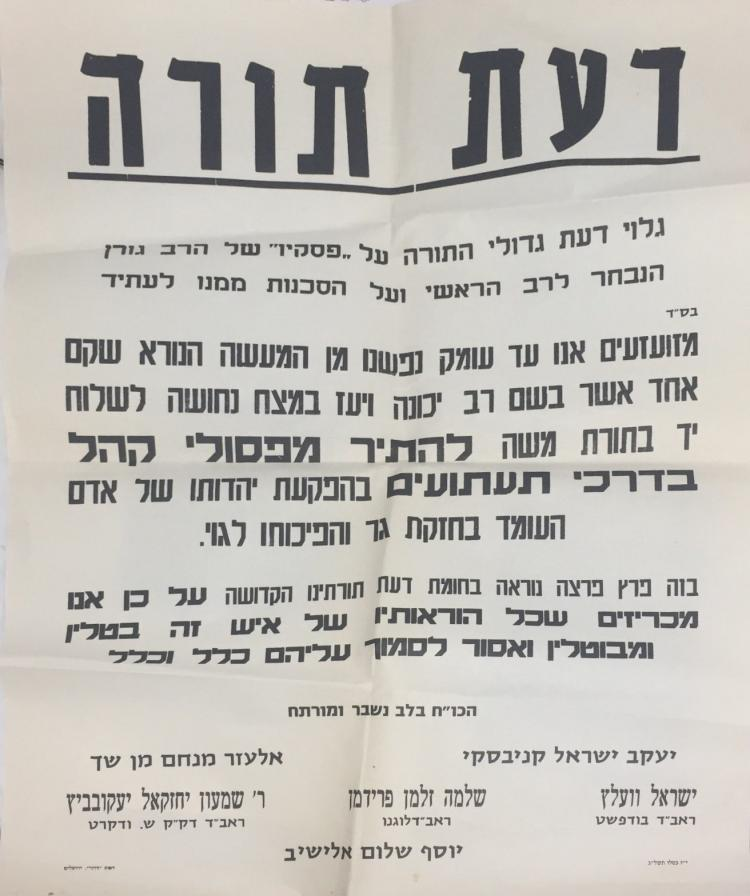
Poster signed by prominent rabbis exhorting people to not rely on Goren's halakhic rulings, 1972

Goren attracted many admirers through his passion for Religious Zionism and his combining of Zionist activism with a commitment to Judaism and Jewish scholarship. However, his uncompromising personality later resulted in him becoming a polarizing and controversial figure in Israeli politics. Goren called the vehement attacks against him a "moral and religious scandal".

=== The Langer Controversy ===
In November 1972, Goren presided over a panel of nine dayanim to review the case of Sgt. Maj. Hanoch Langer, and his sister Miriam, who had been declared mamzerim, and therefore ineligible for marriage to an Israelite by a Beit Din in Petah Tikva.

The Langer children had been designated as mamzerim because their mother had married their father, without having been divorced from her previous husband, thus committing adultery according to Jewish law.

Fearing a review of the case would prompt the secularists in the government, such as Gideon Hausner of the Independent Liberal Party, to press for the introduction of civil marriage in Israel to break the rabbinate's exclusive control over marriage, Goren controversially reversed the ruling.

Goren's reversal was fiercely opposed, primarily by the Agudat Yisrael and Rav Ovadiah Yosef. Some prominent rabbis, however, such as Rav Soloveitchik and Rav Yosef Eliahu Henkin, came out in support of Goren. There is significant doubt that Rav Soloveitchik agreed with Rav Goren. He is said to have told Rav Moshe Feinstein that he disagreed with the heter.

=== Halakha and the Israeli state ===
Goren spent most of his term as Chief Rabbi of Israel attempting to reconcile Jewish religious teachings with modern problems of the state, including advancements in technological progress and various high-profile conversion cases. Goren often clashed with his more conservative rabbinical colleagues.

One example of Goren's desire to adapt Halakha to changing realities in science was his controversial stance on Kiddush Levana, the monthly blessing over the new moon marking the first day of a Jewish month. A prayer customarily added after the blessing contains the words "just as I dance before you and am unable to touch you." Goren said that since the Americans landed on the Moon in 1969, this line should be changed to reflect that it is, in fact, possible to touch the Moon.

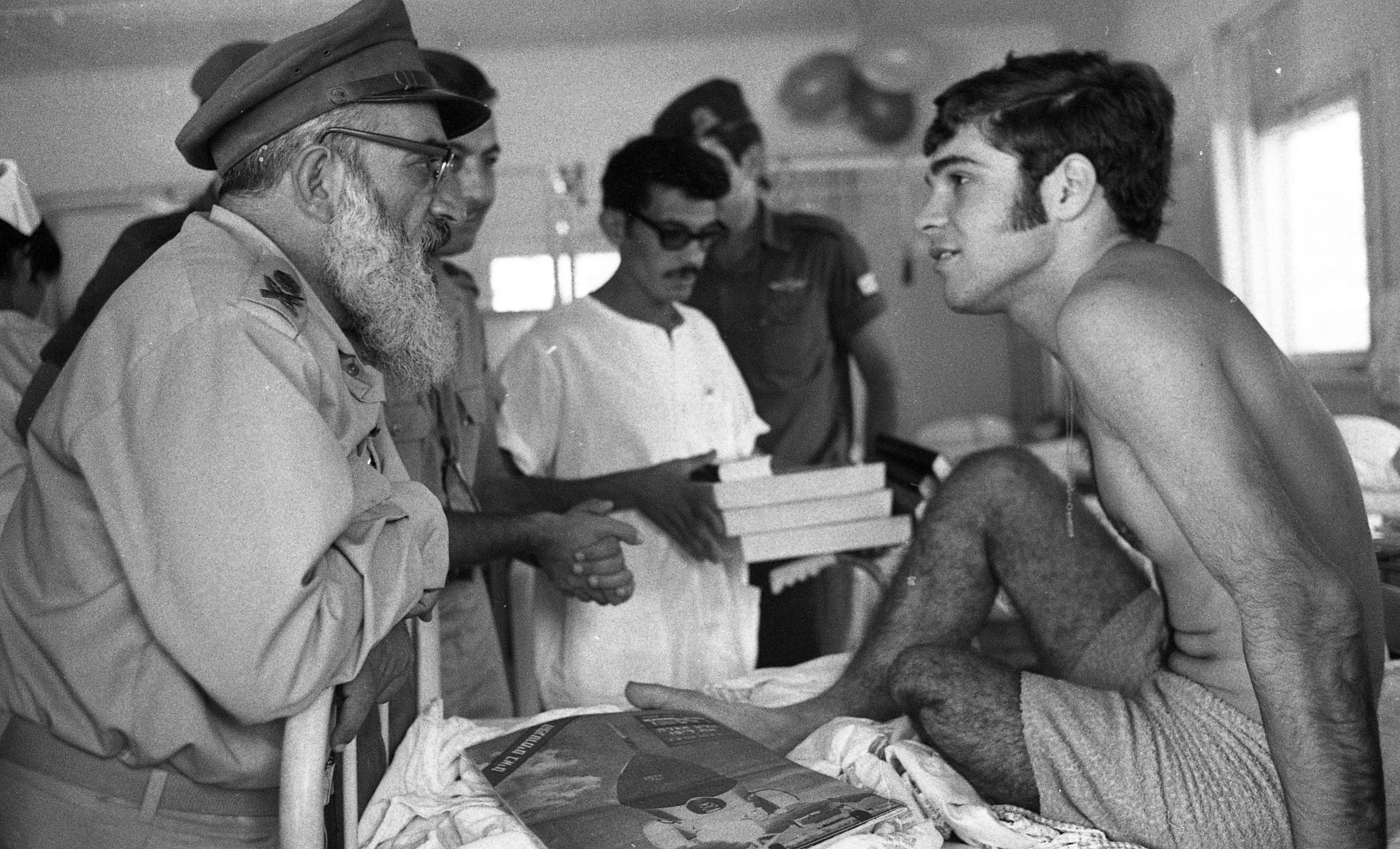
Goren visiting wounded Israeli soldiers at a medical facility, 1969

== Religious Zionist activism ==
=== Third Temple in Jerusalem ===
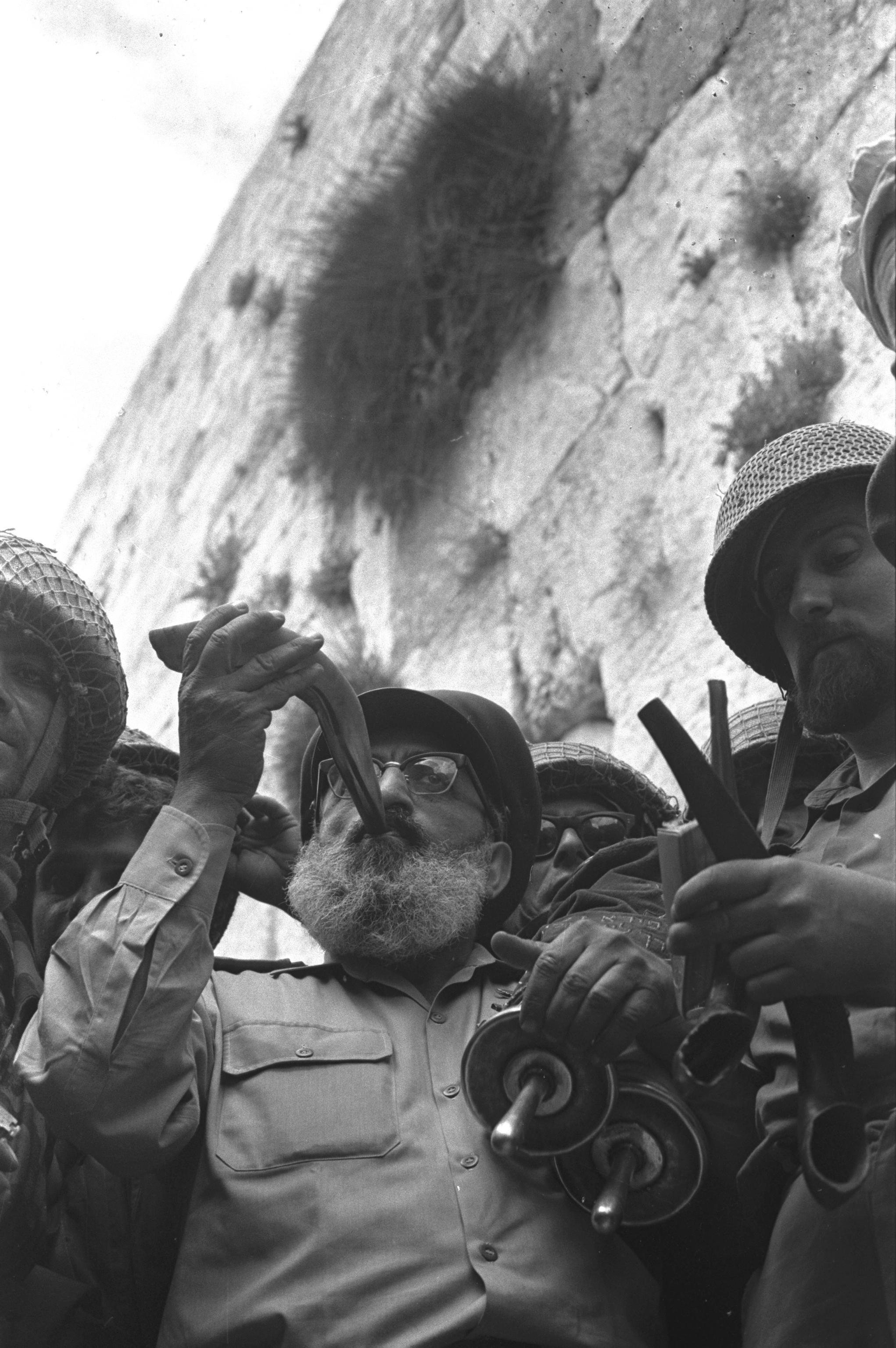
Goren blows his shofar at the Western Wall after Israel's capture of East Jerusalem in the Six-Day War, 1967.

Goren repeatedly advocated for building a Third Temple on the Temple Mount from the 1960s onward, and was associated with various messianic projects involving the Temple Mount. He was well known for his controversial positions concerning Jewish sovereignty over the Temple Mount. On 15 August 1967, two months after the Six-Day War, Goren led a group of fifty Jews onto the Temple Mount, where, fighting off protesting Muslim guards and Israeli police, they defiantly held a prayer service. Goren continued to pray for many years in the Makhkame building overlooking the Temple Mount, where he conducted yearly High Holiday services. His call for the establishment of a synagogue on the Temple Mount has subsequently been reiterated by his brother-in-law, the former Chief Rabbi of Haifa, She'ar Yashuv Cohen.

Goren was sharply criticized by the Israeli Defense Ministry, who, noting Goren's senior rank, called his behavior inappropriate. The episode led the Chief Rabbis of the time to restate the accepted laws of Judaism that no Jews were allowed on the mount due to issues of ritual impurity. The secular authorities welcomed this ruling as it preserved the status quo with the Waqf, the Islamic authority. Disagreeing with his colleagues, Goren continually maintained that Jews were not only permitted, but commanded, to ascend and pray on the mount which is the holiest site in Judaism.

The actual question of Goren's radicalism remains controversial. One widely repeated story about Goren claims that shortly after the Israeli capture of the Temple Mount, the rabbi either argued that Israel should destroy the al Aqsa Mosque and Dome of the Rock, or simply said that it would have been a "good thing" if they had been accidentally destroyed. Goren's close assistant Rabbi Menachem Ha-Cohen, who was with Goren throughout that historic day, denied ever hearing Goren make such a remark. Goren himself personally denied this charge several times. Goren made a speech later that year to a military convention, recorded and later broadcast on Israel's army radio, in which he said of the Dome of the Rock and the al-Aqsa Mosque that "Certainly we should have blown it up. It is a tragedy that we did not do so."

After retiring from official duties as Chief Rabbi, Goren opened and lead the Idra Yeshiva near the Western Wall. The yeshiva changed and was renamed after Goren's death.

==== Illegal excavation sites ====
In the summer of 1983, Goren and several other rabbis joined Rabbi Yehuda Getz, who worked for the Religious Affairs Ministry at the Western Wall, in touring a chamber underneath the mount that Getz had illegally excavated, where the two claimed to have seen the Ark of the Covenant. The excavation was shortly discovered and resulted in a massive brawl between young Jews and Arabs in the area. The access tunnel to the chamber was quickly sealed with concrete by Israeli police.

=== Opposition to the Oslo Accords ===
Goren also made headlines after his term as Chief Rabbi had expired. He was deeply opposed to the Oslo Accords and in 1993 declared that it was halakhically forbidden to dismantle any settlements in the Biblical Land of Israel, and encouraged any soldiers ordered to do so to refuse. In 1994, he announced that Halakha made it a duty for Jews to kill Yasser Arafat, because he endangered Jewish lives.

=== Condemnation of Jewish terrorist attacks ===
Goren has spoken out against Jewish terrorism. In 1982 he and Rabbi Ovadia Yosef officially condemned a shooting attack on the Temple Mount by an American immigrant which resulted in the death of two Muslims and the wounding of several others. In a joint statement released by the Chief Rabbis, they declared that "We and the entire Jewish people attack and deplore the criminal act of murder in every possible way. Through this abominable act [Alan] Goodman has removed himself from the Jewish people...".

== Educational activities ==
Goren was a manager of a Kollel, where he met and educated Rabbi Joel Landau. Landau helped him in managing the Kollel.

Following his term as Ashkenazi Chief Rabbi, he founded the Idra Yeshiva near the Western Wall, which he headed until his passing.

=== Published works ===
- Goren's first work was on the Mishneh Torah of Maimonides, published at age seventeen.
- Sha'arei Taharah on Tractate Mikva'ot, a study of the laws concerning ritual baths (mikva'ot), published at the age of twenty-one. It received an "enthusiastic approbatio" from Rabbi Isser Zalman Meltzer, who had been his rebbe.
- A number of responsa regarding the application of Jewish Law in a modern army
- With Might and Strength: An Autobiography, an (auto)biography redacted by Avi Rath based on his interviews with Goren (2013 in Hebrew, 2016 in English)

==== Quotes ====
- "Human life is undoubtedly a supreme value in Judaism, as expressed both in the Halacha and the prophetic ethic. This refers not only to Jews, but to all men created in the image of God."
- "It is clear that according to Halacha (Jewish religious law), a soldier who receives an order that runs contrary to Torah law should uphold the Halacha, and not the secular order. And since settling the land is a commandment, and uprooting the settlements is breaking the commandment, the soldier should not carry out an order to uproot settlements. This government does not lean on a majority of Jewish support, but rather on Arab votes. According to the Halacha it does not have the authority of a majority, and therefore government directives to uproot the settlements do not have the authority of the majority of the people." (NRP newspaper Hatzofeh, 19 December 1993.)

== Personal life ==
Goren was married to Tzfia Cohen, the daughter of prominent Religious Zionist Rabbi David Cohen, the Nazir of Jerusalem, and the sister of Rabbi She'ar Yashuv Cohen, former deputy-mayor of Jerusalem and later Chief Rabbi of Haifa. Both Goren's father-in-law and brother-in-law were also prominent rabbinical vegetarians.

Goren and Tzfia Goren had three children: retired justice Tchiya Shapiro; psychologist Drorit Tamari; and Abraham (Rami) Goren, executive vice president of Elbit Imaging.

=== Vegetarianism ===
Goren was a strict vegetarian after he visited a slaughterhouse in Canada in 1967 to perform an inspection of kashrut.

== Awards ==
- In 1961, Goren was awarded the Israel Prize in Rabbinical literature.

== Bibliography ==
- The Crown of Holiness, an interpretation and commentary on Maimonides' Mishneh Torah, 1934.
- Sha’rei Taharah, a study on the laws of niddah, 1940.
- Ha-Yerushalmi ha-Meforash, commentary on the Jerusalem Talmud, 1961. Recipient of the Israel Prize for Jewish Scholarship.

== See also ==
- List of Israel Prize recipients
- Jewish vegetarianism

Jewish titles
Preceded by Isser Yehuda Unterman	Ashkenazi Chief Rabbi of Israel; 1973–1983	Succeeded by Avraham Shapira
Preceded by Position created	Chief Rabbi of the Israel Defense Force; 1948–1951	Succeeded by Mordechai Piron
