= Hefsek taharah =

Test in Orthodox Judaism

In Torah and Rabbinic law, a hefsek taharah ("pause" to initiate "purity") is a verification method used in the Orthodox Jewish community by a woman who is in a niddah state to determine that menstruation has ceased.

The performance of a hefsek taharah is needed to initiate the counting of seven days absent of blood discharge.

== Mishnaic source ==
The source for a Jewish woman to perform an "examination" is quoted implicitly in the Mishnah;

A niddah who examined herself on the seventh day, in the morning...

— Mishnah Niddah 10:2

There is a difference of opinion amongst halakhic sources whether the self-examination is D'Oraita (required by Torah law) or D'Rabbanan (rabbinical requirement).

== Methodology ==
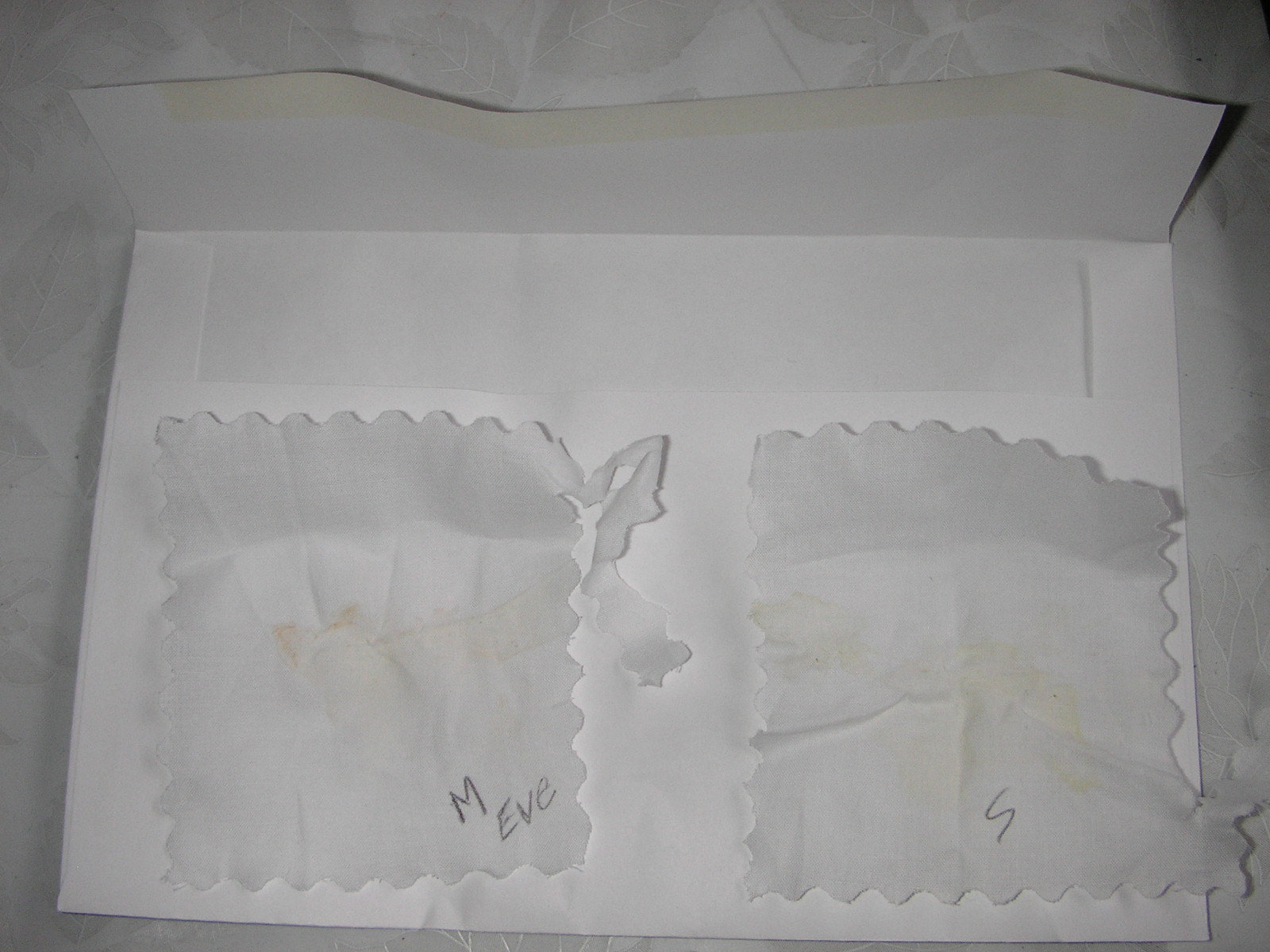
Bedikah example

In the Orthodox Jewish community, women may test whether menstruation has ceased; this ritual is known as the hefsek tahara. The woman takes a bath or shower near sunset, wraps a clean white cloth ("bedikah cloth") around her finger, and swipes the inner vaginal circumference. If the cloth shows only discharges that are white, yellow, or clear, then menstruation is considered to have ceased. If discharge is bright red, it indicates that menstruation is still in effect. If it is any other color, it is subject to further inquiry, often involving consultation with a rabbi.

The ritual requires that the cloth used to perform this test is first checked carefully to ensure that it is clean of any marks, colored threads, or specks; the cloth itself can be any clean white cloth, although there are small cloths designed for this ritual, known as bedikah (meaning checking).

In the Orthodox Jewish community, further rituals are practices toward assurance regarding the cessation of the menstrual flow. After the hefsek tahara, some women insert a cloth (or, in modern times, a tampon), consequently known as a moch dachuk, for between 18 minutes and an hour, to ensure that there is no uterine blood; this must be done carefully, as it could otherwise irritate the mucous membrane, causing bleeding unrelated to menstruation. If there is any fear of irritation causing bleeding, a rabbi may waive this practice.

Some women also repeat the "bedikah" each morning and evening of the seven days subsequent to the end of menstruation. Another tradition is the wearing of white underwear and use of white bedding during this period; conversely, the rest of the time, when not counting the "seven clean days", some women who experience spotting deliberately use coloured underwear and coloured toilet paper, since it is only when blood is seen on white material that it has tumah status in Jewish law.

When not during their seven "clean" days, all women are advised to wear colored undergarments.

=== The cloth ===
The bedikah cloth or "checking cloth", called an id ('cloth') or an eid ('witness') in Hebrew, is a clean piece of white cloth used in the process of purifying a niddah. It is used by observant Jewish women to determine whether they have finished menstruation. The cloth is inserted into the vagina, and if no blood is found, the woman may start counting the seven blood-free days. On each of these days, she performs this examination in the morning and in the later afternoon before sunset. If no blood is found, she may go to the mikveh on the eighth evening after nightfall, and then engage in relations with her husband.

This practice is also occasionally used by Jewish men to check if he has gotten blood on himself from his wife after relations to determine whether she menstruates during relations.

Such cloths are about two by four inches, and are available at local Judaica stores, the local mikveh, stores in Orthodox neighborhoods in Israel and pharmacies and some supermarkets in Israel, or may be cut from clean all-white soft cotton or linen fabric.

=== Newlywed ===
According to Orthodox authorities, a bride who experiences bleeding from the hymen upon her marriage's consummation counts only four days before performing a hefsek tahara, instead of the usual five.
