= Rabbi Zeira's stringency =

Jewish ritual purity law for menstruation

Rabbi Zeira's stringency (Imperial Aramaic: חומרא דרבי זירא) or the stringency of the daughters of Israel (Hebrew: חומרת בנות ישראל) relates to the law of niddah (a woman during menstruation) and refers to the stringency expounded in the Talmud where all menstruant women, at the conclusion of their menstrual flow, were to count seven days of cleanness, just as women would do who suffered an "irregular flow" (Hebrew: זיבה, romanized: zivah) as defined in Jewish law.

The stringency was enacted due to the confusion of Jewish women on how to view their menstrual flow, whether it was deemed a regular menstrual flow, or one which came as an irregular flow (see infra), known in rabbinic terminology as the zavah ketanah ("minor zavah"), and the zavah gedolah (major "zavah"). By declaring that all women had the status of zavah gedolah, this required them to count seven days of cleanness before immersing.

== Biblical background ==
The original Torah instruction was that a woman contracted the impurity of niddah by experiencing a uterine discharge of blood (or, using the Talmudic terminology, "seeing blood"). For a minimum of seven days (beginning on the day of the start of her menstruation, and ending with the completion of the sunset of the seventh day), the woman is considered impure and defiles any Jew, food, and item that she touches (Leviticus 15: 19–24) . In addition, committing relations with any man (including her husband), is strictly forbidden (Leviticus 18: 19). The divine punishment for committing relations while being niddah or with a niddah is kareth (extirpation) (Leviticus 20: 18), and the punishment in court – flagellation.

The seven days from the start of the menstruation are known as the "days of the menstruate" (Hebrew: yemei niddah), no matter how long her menstruation lasted. So long as her menstruation lasts seven days or less, she is entitled to immerse after sunset of the seventh day, and thus be purified. (Yet if the menstruation continues to her eighth day or beyond she becomes a zavah).

Only if a woman had an "irregular flow" (Heb. zivah) did she become a zavah. The "irregular flow" was determined in the following manner: From the eighth day after the beginning of her period (the terminus post quem, or the earliest date in which they begin to reckon the case of a zavah), when she should have normally concluded her period, began eleven days that are known as the days of a running issue (Heb. yemei zivah), which simply defines a time (from the 8th to the 18th day, for a total of eleven days) during which, if the woman had an irregular flow of blood for one or two days, she becomes a minor zavah (Heb: zavah ketanah), and must wait for the cessation of blood flow, and then, on the condition that the flow had stopped before sunset, may immerse as soon as the sun dawns the next morning.

If the irregular flow lasted for three consecutive days or more, the woman becomes a major zavah (zavah gedolah), and is required to count seven days of cleanness once her menstrual flow ceases (Leviticus 15:25–28). Only from the seventh day of cleanness may she immerse and be purified.

if a major zavah sees blood during her seven days of cleanness she must start the seven days from the beginning, and will not return to her days of menstruate, until she manages to be clean during all of the seven days.

Laws of a zavah (both major and minor)' pertaining to purity and relations are identical to that of a niddah, the main difference being the duration of the impurity. the duration is also the main difference between a major and minor zavah. Another difference is that a major zavah must bring a special offering of a pair of birds to the temple (Leviticus 15: 29–30).

== Evolution of the stringency ==
=== Rabbi Judah Ha-Nasi's ordinance ===
Because of the complexities in determining the days of niddah and zivah in many women, especially with those who do not have fixed periods, Rabbi Judah Ha-Nasi decreed that all menstruant women are to be viewed as in an uncertain condition, placing upon them the stringencies of both niddah and zivah regardless of when they saw blood. In practicality, this meant that a woman who saw blood for a duration of two days or less, needed to wait six days (in addition to the days during which she had seen blood). As of the night after the conclusion of these days she would be able to purify herself by means of immersion.

Women who saw blood for three consecutive days, the stringencies of zavah gedolah were imposed upon her, regardless of when they saw the blood. During these seven days she would need to perform vaginal checking (bedikah) to ensure that the flow had stopped.

In effect, this meant that in most cases, women needed seven days of cleanness as part of their purification process after menstruation, long before Rabbi Zeira's stringency came to be.

=== The stringency of the daughters of Israel ===
Following the ordinance, many women took upon themselves to practise seven days of cleanness even if they had experienced a discharge of blood of minuscule amount, even as small as a seed of mustard. The Talmud documents this in the name of the amorah Rabbi Zeira, eventually giving the stringency the popular name "Rabbi Zeira's stringency".

=== The sages approval of the stringency ===
Once the custom of practising seven days of cleanness for any discharge of blood became widespread, the sages of Israel declared that all menstruant women are to be viewed in such a doubtful condition, regardless of when they saw blood, requiring them all to count seven days of cleanness before their immersion. The Talmud views the stringency as an indisputable law.

In effect, In most cases Rabbi Zeira's stringency does not postpone a menstruant woman's immersion any more than Rabbi Judah Ha-Nasi's ordinance.

The stringency is generally most felt after childbirth, as well as after a woman becomes impure as a result of hymenal bleeding, due to a separate rabbinical stringency.

Other cases in which the purification process may be prolonged because of Rabbi Zeira's stringency include impurities due to spotting, stains, or as a result of miscarriage.

== Halakhic status of the stringency ==
The Talmud Bavli disagrees on how to view the said stringency in terms of it being categorized as a custom or a law, Rava – in dialogue with his student Rav Pappa – abstained from viewing it as a halakha, saying that it is location-based, with communities fully entitled not to comply. Rashi views Rava's comments to his student as hinting that the said stringency evolved into a takanah.

The Rambam (Hilkhot Issurei Biah 11, 3–4) viewed the stringency as is, a "stringency" alone and not a rabbinic enactment, but he nonetheless advocated adherence to it since (by his era) all known communities abided by it, making it as a neder (vow) that is implicitly applicable. This view is in consensus with practically all other Orthodox authorities

Among other poskim, Rabbi Avraham HaKohen Kook was of the opinion the stringency is on par with other rabbinic prohibitions, and perhaps lesser than a full-blown rabbinic prohibition.

Thus, according to his view, although the stringency must be observed completely, in very extreme cases (such as in scenarios of possible life and death implications, as was the case referred to in his responsum), leniency may be sought, and applied.

== See also ==
- Tumah and taharah
- Zav
