= Slonim-Nevo Commission =

The Slonim Nevo Commission is a commission appointed in 2006 by the Israeli Ministry of Justice to examine discrimination in access to children in separation or divorce, particularly discrimination against men. Family Courts in Israel do not conduct trials on visitation rights, they delegate the powers to determine them to Social Workers who are appointed as aides of Court. Its report was delivered in 2008. The Minister of Justice, Moshe Kahlon decided to take no action.

== Main findings of the Slonim Nevo Commission in Israel ==
The commission has found that social workers appointed as aides of Court to determine rights of visitations are understaffed, lack appropriate guidance, lack of transparency and reliability, and cause increased levels of deprivation and frustration among the fathers.

- The policies and guidelines are not up to date.
- Social workers act as both investigators and therapists; however, they use information extracted during therapy to hurt fathers in the investigatory Visitations Rights Report.
- Duties of confidentiality owed to fathers who are forced to go through psychotherapy, as condition to seeing their children, are constantly breached.
- The Commission further found that the social workers should not write a Social Welfare report to the Family Court about a family previously treated by it as a welfare agent or social worker.
- Occasionally welfare officers must conduct a Report on families, who were treated by them previously, as social workers. In most cases, the social worker's acquaintance of the family caregiver is with the woman, thus earning the Social worker's sympathy in advance. The prior acquaintance creates bias against the man.
- The Commission recommended that Welfare officers must provide an objective opinion, and therefore they should not have a previous acquaintance with the family.
- Social workers do not provide copies of the reports to the adversaries in Court, thus denying the parents procedural rights to know the contents of the reports.
- The commission also recommended appointing an independent ombudsman officer to review all complaints regarding the welfare officers.
- The Commission also found that Visitation Reports do not adhere to professional principles. Training in preparing Visitations Reports are lacking.
- The duration of the services is too long, and appointment for more than one year is not necessary.
- Because of personnel shortage, the waiting list for Visitations Reports is too long, and during the waiting period, fathers are disconnected from children.

== Other observations of the Slonim-Nevo Commission ==
The Commission further criticized the privatization of state responsibility to provide a forum, to litigate custody and visitations. The delegation of powers to social workers raises questions and concerns regarding the definition of welfare officer role and work.

Social Workers or Welfare officer's role is to perform an investigation, draw a factual picture of the family, followed by recommendations about custody arrangements. The welfare officers tend to mix therapeutic components with investigatory ones. While Courts expect them to provide diagnostic reports, the social workers instead resort to forced therapy treatments. The social workers then use the information stated by the patient, and submits it to court.

The Commission found that Social Workers should limit themselves to the obvious welfare job, which is to focus on gathering information, assessment and formulating recommendations about the parents as caregivers, without therapy or over-involvement in the parents’ intimate lives.
