= Two Kings (book series) =

- Two Kings: Let's Go Play; Two Kings: It's My Turn
- Author: Fishel Jacobs
- Language: English; Hebrew
- Genre: Children's literature
- Publisher: Israel Bookshop Publications
- No. of books: 2

Two Kings is a series of two Jewish children's books by American-Israel rabbi and author Fishel Jacobs.

The two books in the series are Two Kings: Let's Go Play (2008) and Two Kings: It's My Turn (2009). The books were later published in Hebrew in 2014.

== Plot ==
The Two Kings series centers around the story of a young boy named David and his Good King and Bad King. The two kings represent his Yetzer Hatov, the inclination in Judaism to good, and his Yetzer Hara, the inclination in Judaism to do evil. David struggles with choices and the two kings fight with each other to influence David's decisions. At the end of each book, David eventually chooses the right thing and becomes wiser for it.

=== Two Kings: Let's Go Play ===
Two Kings: Let's Go Play, also known as Two Kings 1, is the first book in the series and was published in 2008 by Israel Bookshop Publications. The book was written by Fishel Jacobs and designed by John Reinhardt. In the book, David must make a choice between babysitting his little sister inside or playing outside with his friends. He ends up inviting his friends inside to color with him.

=== Two Kings: It's My Turn ===
Two Kings: It's My Turn, also known as Two Kings 2, is the second book in the series and was published in 2009 by Israel Bookshop Publications. In the book, David must make a choice between playing games on the computer or allowing his sister to use it, who needs it for a school project due the next day.

== Reception ==
Reception of the Two Kings series were generally critical and many commented that the religious message and examples felt forced.

The Jewish Book Council stated that, "The situations David faces are appropriate to today’s young children, but they feel forced and preachy. . . . Brightly colored, simplistic, cartoon-like illustrations show the smiling Good King and the frowning Bad King whispering in David’s ear and battling each other for control of his actions."

The Association of Jewish Libraries stated that in Two Kings: Let's Go Play, "Their arguing and wrestling in David’s mind is interesting but the premise and the moral—listen to your parents and they will be proud—is about as unsubtle as possible. Most boys would not give up running around outside to go inside and sit quietly. It would seem that if David is responsible enough to watch a baby, he is probably older than the target audience for this book, again emphasizing the incongruence of the message with the example. Recommended for Orthodox preschools only."

A review from Chabad.org stated that the book was “... an illustrated tale of a child’s conflicting impulses - is an accomplishment 30 years in the making.” The books have also been adapted to plays, shown in Israeli schools.

An article in Beis Moshiach Magazine stated "Two Kings has become a driving force in education. And its conceptual thesis effortlessly resolves the greatest internal conflicts in the minds and hearts of children."

In 2014, a third title in the Two Kings series was also announced to be in preparation for publication. As of 2019, a third book has not been published.
