= Benny Sela =

Israeli serial rapist (born 1971)

- בני סלע
- Born: 1971 (age 54–55); Tel Aviv, Israel
- Status: Imprisoned
- Convictions: 13 counts of rape, sodomy, and sexual assault Escape; Indecent assault
- Penalty: 40 years and 3 months imprisonment

Benny Sela (Hebrew: בני סלע; born 1971) is an Israeli serial rapist.

== Early life ==
Born in Tel Aviv, Sela grew up in the Hatikva Quarter, an impoverished neighbourhood of Tel Aviv, and as a young boy, witnessed his alcoholic father commit suicide by jumping off an electric pole. He subsequently entered foster care. As a teenager, he stayed as a boarder at kibbutz Sha'ar HaGolan following a social worker's recommendation, where it is believed he committed his first rape. His case later entered the textbook of Israeli social work education as an example of severe failures in his foster care as a teenager.

== Crime spree ==
Israeli authorities believe Sela committed his first rape in 1985, when as a teenage boarder at kibbutz Sha'ar HaGolan, he lured a female boarder into the bomb shelter, then locked her in, beat and stabbed her with a pocketknife, raped her, and threatened to kill her if she told anyone. In 1993, he was charged with indecent assault on four young women in Netanya.

Sela began his rape spree in Tel Aviv in 1994. According to police, Sela committed at least 24 and possibly as many as 34 rapes, sexual assaults, and sexual molestations of women and girls over the course of five years. Sela would break into their homes, usually late at night or in the early morning, sometimes threatening them with a knife and sometimes beating them. To avoid identification, he would attack and then rape his victims from behind, ensuring that they would only get glimpses of him. He would sometimes tie up his victims with telephone wire or stuff clothes into their mouths. In three instances, he videotaped his victims and threatened to publish the tape on the Internet or give it to their friends if they reported the crime. In one instance, Sela opened an electricity box and turned off power for an entire building, then attacked a 12 year old girl who emerged from the building to see what had happened. One of his victims was attacked twice. After completing a rape, Sela would force his victims to shower to reduce physical evidence, and threatened to kill them if they left the shower before half an hour had passed. Sela's rape spree gained notoriety, and he became known as the "Tel Aviv rapist". In 1995, he was arrested and sentenced to two years in prison for having systematically molested his cousin from the time she was eight to when she was fifteen. While awaiting trial, Sela made an attempt to escape. Despite having refused psychological treatment and at least one psychologist warning that he was still a danger to the public, Sela was released on parole for good behaviour six months early. He then resumed his rape spree.

== Capture ==
Sela was arrested in Tel Aviv on December 14, 1999, by police responding to reports of an attack on a young woman and an eight-year-old girl. He had departed from his usual modus operandi of attacks inside residences at night or in the early morning and committed the attacks in broad daylight. Police noticed that Sela's appearance matched descriptions of the Tel Aviv rapist, and during an investigation of his criminal record, it was noted that the Tel Aviv rapes had stopped while he was in prison. Detectives then took a DNA sample, which matched samples given by nine of the victims. Sela was indicted on 14 counts of rape, and under a plea bargain was sentenced to 35 years and nine months imprisonment.

== Escape and recapture ==
On November 24, 2006, Sela escaped while being transferred to a court hearing. During his time on the run, he broke into a home in Pardes Hanna-Karkur and stole money, documents, valuables, credit cards, and a key. He also stole a car. After an intensive search and a tip from a relative whom Sela had visited, he was recaptured on December 8 near kibbutz Lohamei HaGeta'ot. There was controversy after pictures emerged of officers abusing and humiliating Sela after his capture. He was sentenced to an additional four years in prison for offences committed during his escape.

== Life in prison ==
Sela was first incarcerated at Eshel Prison in Beersheba. He was allegedly stabbed twice in the back by prisoners while imprisoned there, although the Israel Prison Service denied it. Following his escape and recapture, he was transferred to Rimonim Prison in Even Yehuda, where he was placed in solitary confinement in the National Isolation Unit, an ultra-high security six-cell wing of the prison used to house some of the most notorious criminals in Israel. He was later transferred to HaSharon Prison, near Tel Mond, and then to Nitzan Prison in Ramla, where he is currently incarcerated.

While imprisoned, Sela filed dozens of court motions every year, most of which focused on inconsequential issues and were rejected. Due to his persistent motions, he became known as a "serial appellant". The repeated motions put a burden on the authorities, as the Israel Prison Service was tasked with bringing him to each hearing and returning him to prison, a process that necessitated the presence of police and massive security due to Sela being considered a high escape risk. On August 14, 2011, the Beersheba District Court limited Sela to eight motions per year and imposed a NIS 70 fine on him for every motion rejected. Judge Shlomo Friedlander said that the decision was to prevent authorities from spending an unequal share of their resources on his appeals, which could deny other prisoners their rights.

In 2010, Sela exposed himself to a female guard during his daily walk in the prison yard, and was placed in solitary confinement.

In May 2011, Sela's mother Rivka was caught attempting to smuggle him pornographic DVDs in a file she had claimed contained court documents during a court hearing.

In September 2015, Sela was suspected of raping his cellmate.

In April 2017, Sela was convicted of indecently exposing himself to a female prison employee two years earlier, and had another six months added to his sentence.
