= Fishel Jacobs =

American-Israeli rabbi and author (born 1956)

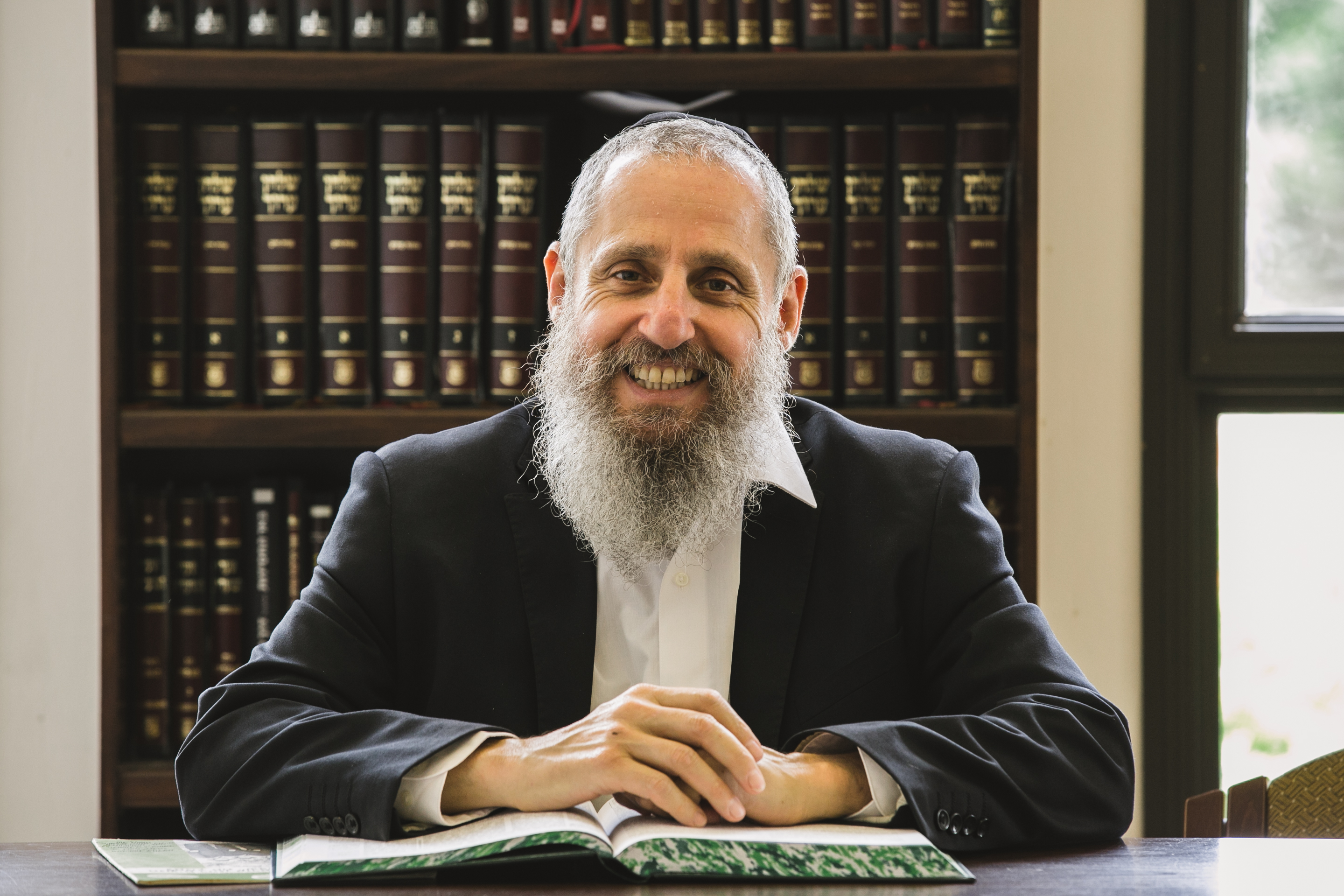
- Born: 21 March 1956 (age 70)
- Education: University of Vermont
- Occupations: Rabbi, author, speaker
- Known for: Family Purity—Guide To Marital Fulfillment; Coffee Melts Bars; Two Kings children's books
- Spouse: Miriam
- Website: www.rabbijacobs.com www.powerrabbi.com

Fishel Jacobs (born March 21, 1956) is an American-Israeli rabbi, martial artist, ex-Israel prison service officer, author, and speaker.

== Early years and education ==
Jacobs was born in 1956 in Brooklyn, raised in Vermont, and has lived in Israel since 1979. In 1974, Jacobs earned a black belt in karate from the International Tang Soo Do Association. He graduated from the University of Vermont. Jacobs holds a PhD degree (equivalency) from the Israel Department of Religion, and completed training as a Rabbinic attorney from the Harry Fischel Institute for Talmudic Research. In 2006, he was promoted to Eighth Degree Black Belt Master Instructor by Dr. Grandmaster Tae Yun Kim.

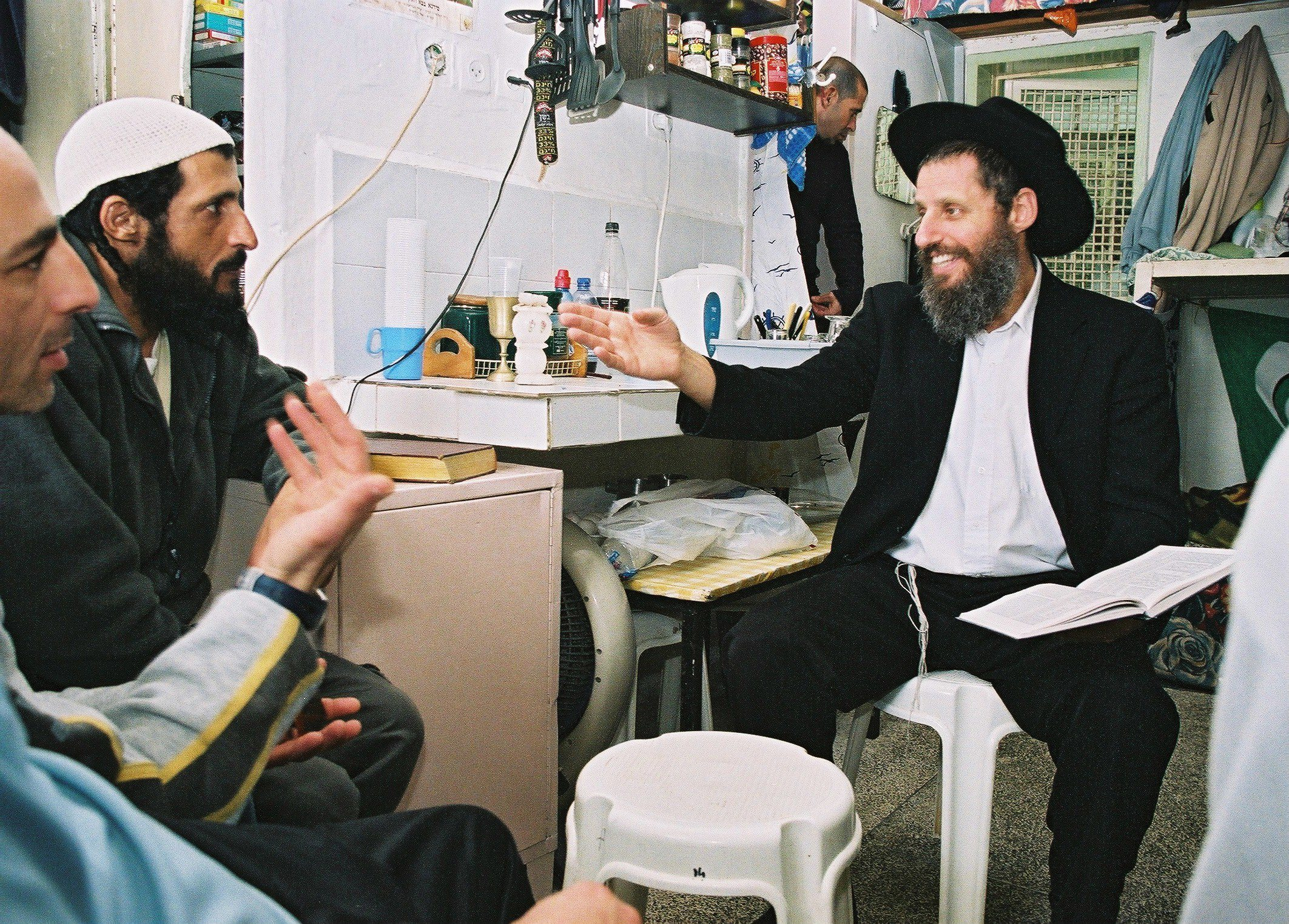
Photo of Rabbi Fishel Jacobs teaching inmates in Israeli Prison

== Work ==
After spending fourteen years studying in the rabbinical school, Tomchei Temimim, in Kfar Chabad, Israel, Jacobs served as emissary of the Lubavitcher Rebbe, Rabbi Menachem Schneersohn from 1998 to 2007, and the Chabad-Lubavitch Campus chaplain at Tel Aviv University. Concurrently, from 1992 until 2005 he served as a full-time chaplain, a staff-officer with the rank of Major, in the Israel Prison Service (IPS).

In 2005, Jacobs published the first book describing life within the IPS, republished in 2016 under the title Coffee Melts Bars: My Israeli Prison Career. He is also the author of the Two Kings series of children's books.

Jacobs is a Chabad-Lubavitch Rabbi and speaker. He has published ten non-fiction books, including works on difficult areas of practical Talmudic law. His interviews, articles and columns have appeared in Jewish and mainstream media.

Jacobs is the responding rabbi for a few websites that deal in practical Talmudic law. He performs karate demonstrations while speaking at college campuses, youth groups, communities and corporations.

== Personal life ==
Jacobs is married to Miriam, the Director of Tan"ach (scriptural commentaries) division of Beth Rivkah Seminary, Kfar Chabad.

== Publications ==
- Family Purity: A Guide to Family Purity, ISBN 978-0967348186, Campus Living and Learning (2000)
- Israel Behind Bars: True Stories of Hope And Redemption, ISBN 978-0977673605, (2005)
- Blech Book – Complete & Illustrated Guide, ISBN 978-0967348179, Merkos Linyonei Chinuch (2007)
- Two Kings, ISBN 978-0967348148, Israel Bookshop Publications (2009).
- Coffee Melts Bars: My Israeli Maximum Security Prison Life, ISBN 978-0986231902, Gefen Publishing (2016)
