= Mordechai Piron =

Second chief military rabbi of the Israel Defense Forces

Mordechai Piron in 1971

Mordechai Piron (Hebrew: מרדכי פירון; born Egon Pisk; 28 December 1921 – 28 May 2014) was the second chief military rabbi in the history of the Israel Defense Forces (IDF), after his predecessor, Rabbi Shlomo Goren, created the position in 1948. Rabbi Piron served in the position from 1969 to 1980, with a rank of general. Upon his retirement from his IDF position, he relocated to Zürich, to serve till 1992 as rabbi of the Israelitische Cultusgemeinde Zürich (ICZ), the biggest Jewish congregation in Switzerland.

Rabbi Piron has published several books on Jewish philosophy and theology and was the head of the Sapir Center for Jewish Education and Culture in Jerusalem. He was an advocate of interfaith dialogue among world religions, chaired The Israel Jewish Council for Interreligious Relations (IJCIR), and sat on the board of world religious leaders for The Elijah Interfaith Institute.

== Life and military career ==
Born in Vienna, Austria, Piron was the only child of Viennese religious Jewish parents of Eastern European origins. He grew up in the Leopoldstadt, and first went to a religious Jewish school and later to the Sperlgymnasium. He left Vienna for Palestine on 28 October 1938 with the Youth Aliyah and joined its agricultural school Mikveh Yisrael. After a year and a half, he enrolled in Yeshivat Mercaz HaRav Kook, studying under rabbi Zvi Yehuda Kook. In 1946 he married Ahuva Gardi and settled in Jerusalem. In 1952 he was ordained as a rabbi.

Piron served in the IDF since 1948, becoming second-in-command to chief military rabbi Shlomo Goren and succeeding him in 1969. He died in Jerusalem on 28 May 2014.

== Controversy ==
Rabbi Piron officiated at the wedding of Chanoch Langer. The disputed legitimacy of this wedding was settled in 1972 with "The Brother and Sister verdict" of Rabbi Goren as chief rabbi of Tel Aviv, a years-long case that made front-page headlines in Israel.
