= Er Wang =

Er Wang (Two Wangs or Two Kings) may refer to:

- Wang Xizhi and Wang Xianzhi (calligrapher), Jin dynasty father-and-son calligraphers
- Wang Zongfang and Wang Zongwei, Chinese serial killers
- Erwang Temple, in Dujiangyan City, Sichuan, China

== See also ==
- Erlang (disambiguation)
