= Nitai =

Nitai, Nittai, or Nitay (Hebrew: נתאי) may refer to:

== People ==
- Benzion Netanyahu (1910–2012), an Israeli historian who wrote under the name "Nitai" or "Nitay"
- Benjamin Netanyahu (born 1949, PM of Israel) lived in the United States as "Ben Nitai" or "Ben Nitay"
- Nityananda (born circa 1474), a Bengali saint, also referred to as Nitai
- Nittai of Arbela, a Jewish jurist of the Second Temple period
- Nitai Roy Chowdhury, a Bangladeshi lawyer and politician
- Nitai Hershkovits (born 1988), an Israeli jazz musician
- Nityananda (Nitai) Palit (1923–1990), an Indian playwright, actor and director

== Other ==
- Mount Nitai, a mountain in Israel

== See also ==
- Nityananda (disambiguation)
