= Nitya =

Nitya may refer to:

== Hinduism ==
- Nitya, a category of being used in the logical framework of Vedanta
- Nitya-samsarins, as classified by Shri Madhvacharya, souls which are eternally transmigrating
- Nitya karma, a set of Hindu rituals

== Organizations ==
- Kavre Nitya Chandeswor, village development committee in Kavrepalanchok District in the Bagmati Zone of central Nepal
- Nitya Seva, association which supports disadvantaged sections of society

== People ==
- Nitya Anand (1925–2024), scientist, director of Central Drug Research Institute in Lucknow
- Nitya Chaitanya Yati (1923–1999), Indian philosopher
- Nitya Krishinda Maheswari (born 1988), Indonesian badminton player
- Nitya Pibulsonggram (1941–2014), Thai career diplomat and politician
- Nitya Nand Reddy (born 1950), Fiji Indian, accountant and unionist, before being elected to the House of Representatives of Fiji
- Nitya Vidyasagar, Indian-American actress and former Sesame Street cast member
- Nitya Mehra, Indian film director and screenwriter
- Nitya Shetty, Indian actress of Telugu and Tamil films

== See also ==
- Nithya (disambiguation)
