= Abataly =

Abataly (Russian: Абата́лий) is an old and rare Russian male first name. Included into various, often handwritten, church calendars throughout the 17th–19th centuries, it was omitted from the official Synodal Menologium at the end of the 19th century. It is possibly derived from Abtalion, or from a Greek word meaning a sanctuary, a temple.
