= Zugot =

Era of the Pairs

The Zugot (/ˌzuːˈɡɒt/; Hebrew: הַזּוּגוֹת, romanized: haz-Zūghōth, lit. 'the Pairs'), also called Zugoth /ˈzuːɡɒθ/ or Zugos /ˌzuːˈɡɒs/ in the Ashkenazi pronunciation, refers both to the two hundred year period (c. 170 BCE – 30 CE, Hebrew: תְּקוּפַת הַזּוּגוֹת, romanized: Təqūfaṯ hazZūgōṯ, lit. 'Era of the Pairs') during the later Second Temple period, in which the spiritual leadership of the Jews was in the hands of five successions of "pairs" of religious teachers, and to each of these pairs themselves.

== Etymology ==
In Hebrew, the word zuḡoṯ indicates pairs; it is the plural of zuḡ, one half of a pair. Like Arabic: زوج, romanized: zawj, it is a loanword from Koine Greek: ζυγόν, romanized: zugón, lit. 'yoke' via Imperial Aramaic: זוגא, romanized: zoḡā and was commonly used to refer to a spouse (cf Yiddish: זוגותי, romanized: zugósi, lit. 'my wife').

== Roles ==
The zugot were five pairs of scholars who ruled the Sanhedrin as the nasi (נָשִׂיא) and as Av Beit Din "chief of the beth din", respectively. After this period, the positions of nasi and av bet din remained, but they were not referred to as zugot.

The title of av beit din existed before the period of the zugot. His purpose was to oversee the Sanhedrin. The nasi was a new institution begun during this period.

== List of zugot ==
There were five pairs of these teachers:

1. Jose ben Joezer and Jose ben Jochanan, who flourished at the time of the Maccabean revolt
2. Joshua ben Perachiah and Nittai of Arbela, at the time of John Hyrcanus
3. Judah ben Tabbai and Simeon ben Shetach, at the time of Alexander Jannaeus and Salome Alexandra
4. Shmaya and Abtalion, at the time of Hyrcanus II
5. Hillel the Elder and Shammai, at the time of King Herod the Great

== Other uses of term zugot ==
Zugot refers to pairs generally. The Babylonian Talmud contains an extensive discussion of the dangers of pairs and of performing various activities in pairs. The discussants expressed belief in a demonology and in practices of sorcery from which protection was needed by avoiding certain activities. The demonology included a discussion of Ashmidai (Asmodai or Asmodeus), referred to as the king of the shedim "demons".

However, later generations did not make efforts to avoid harm from pairings, and their rabbis suggest various reasons why this is the case. The Tosafot ruled that the rules regarding pairs need not be followed as the shedim are no longer prevalent. The Arba'ah Turim included the rules about pairings in Orach Haim 170, but the Beit Yosef disputed this based on the Tosafot. The Shulchan Aruch and Mishneh Torah do not mention concern for pairs. Most recent poskim, including Yosef Hayyim, do not require concern for pairs.

According to Maimonides, the Talmudic rabbis did not see any real danger in pairs; rather, their actual motivation in forbidding pairs was to distance Jews from dualistic religions such as Zoroastrianism which were common at the time.
