= Joshua ben Perachiah =

Rabbi and Nasi of the Sanhedrin

Joshua ben Perahiah or Joshua ben Perachya (Hebrew: יהושע בן פרחיה, romanized: Yehoshuaʿ ben Peraḥyā) was nasi of the Sanhedrin in the latter half of the 2nd century BCE.

== Biography ==
He and his colleague Nittai of Arbela were the second of the five pairs (Zugot) of scholars who received and transmitted Jewish tradition.

At the time of the persecution of the Pharisees by John Hyrcanus (c. 134-104 BCE), Joshua was deposed — a disgrace to which his words in Menachot 109b allude. However, in Sanhedrin 107b and Sotah 47a, it was during the persecutions of Pharisees 88-76 BC by Alexander Jannaeus, not John Hyrcanus whose persecution he fled. He fled to Alexandria, but returned to Jerusalem when the persecutions ceased and the Pharisees again triumphed over the Sadducees.

== Teachings ==
The following ethical maxim found in the Ethics of the Fathers shows his gentle judgment of his fellow men and his eagerness to spread knowledge among the people:

Joshua ben Perahiah and Nittai the Arbelite received [the Torah] from them. Joshua ben Perahiah says, "Set up a teacher [rav] for yourself. And get yourself a companion-disciple. And give everybody the benefit of the doubt."

Only a single halakhah of Joshua's has been preserved: he objected to the import of wheat from Alexandria as impure because, with no rain falling on it, it was watered by still water in conflict with Leviticus 11:38.

In other traditions he was known in Jewish magical papyri as an exorcist, and his name was used in incantations inscribed on magical bowls.

== Yeshu ==
In another tradition he is also the teacher of Yeshu (in uncensored manuscripts of the Talmud), where he and Yeshu flee to Egypt. In other manuscripts his student is Judah ben Tabbai. The account as it appears in the Talmud is as follows:

The Gemara returns to the incident in which Yehoshua ben Peraḥya turned away Jesus the Nazarene: What is this incident? When King Yannai was killing the Sages, Shimon ben Shataḥ was hidden by his sister, Yannai’s wife, while Rabbi Yehoshua ben Peraḥya went and fled to Alexandria of Egypt. When peace was made between Yannai and the Sages, Shimon ben Shataḥ sent him the following letter: From myself, Jerusalem the holy city, to you, Alexandria of Egypt. My sister, my husband dwells within you, and I am sitting desolate. Rabbi Yehoshua ben Peraḥya said: I can learn from it that there is peace, and I can return. When he came back to Eretz Yisrael, Rabbi Yehoshua arrived at a certain inn. The innkeeper stood before him, honoring him considerably, and overall they accorded him great honor. Rabbi Yehoshua ben Peraḥya then sat and was praising them by saying: How beautiful is this inn. Jesus the Nazarene, one of his students, said to him: My teacher, but the eyes of the innkeeper’s wife are narrow [terutot]. Rabbi Yehoshua ben Peraḥya said to him: Wicked one, is this what you are engaged in, gazing at women? He brought out four hundred shofarot and excommunicated him. Every day Jesus would come before him, but he would not accept his wish to return. One day, Rabbi Yehoshua ben Peraḥya was reciting Shema when Jesus came before him. He intended to accept him on this occasion, so he signaled to him with his hand to wait. Jesus thought he was rejecting him entirely. He therefore went and stood up a brick and worshipped it as an idol. Rabbi Yehoshua ben Peraḥya said to him: Return from your sins. Jesus said to him: This is the tradition that I received from you: Anyone who sins and causes the masses to sin is not given the opportunity to repent. The Gemara explains how he caused the masses to sin: For the Master said: Jesus the Nazarene performed sorcery, and he incited the masses, and subverted the masses, and caused the Jewish people to sin. It is taught in a baraita that Rabbi Shimon ben Elazar says: With regard to the evil inclination, to a child, and to a woman, the left hand should reject and the right hand should welcome. If one pushes too forcefully, the damage might be irreversible.

Dunn (1992) considers this to be a story of Jesus from the late Amoraic period, which contains old polemical elements that were already current in New Testament times. His story is parallel to that of Elisha and Gehazi. However: Gustaf Dalman, Joachim Jeremias (1935, 1960), and others do not consider the Yeshu mentioned as Joshua's pupil to be Jesus.

Preceded by Yose ben Yoezer	Nasi; 140 BC - 100 BC	Succeeded by Simeon ben Shetach
