= Jish =

Jish: גִ'שׁ, גּוּשׁ חָלָב; الجش
- Local council

Hebrew transcription(s)
  - ISO 259: Ǧiš, Guš Ḥalav
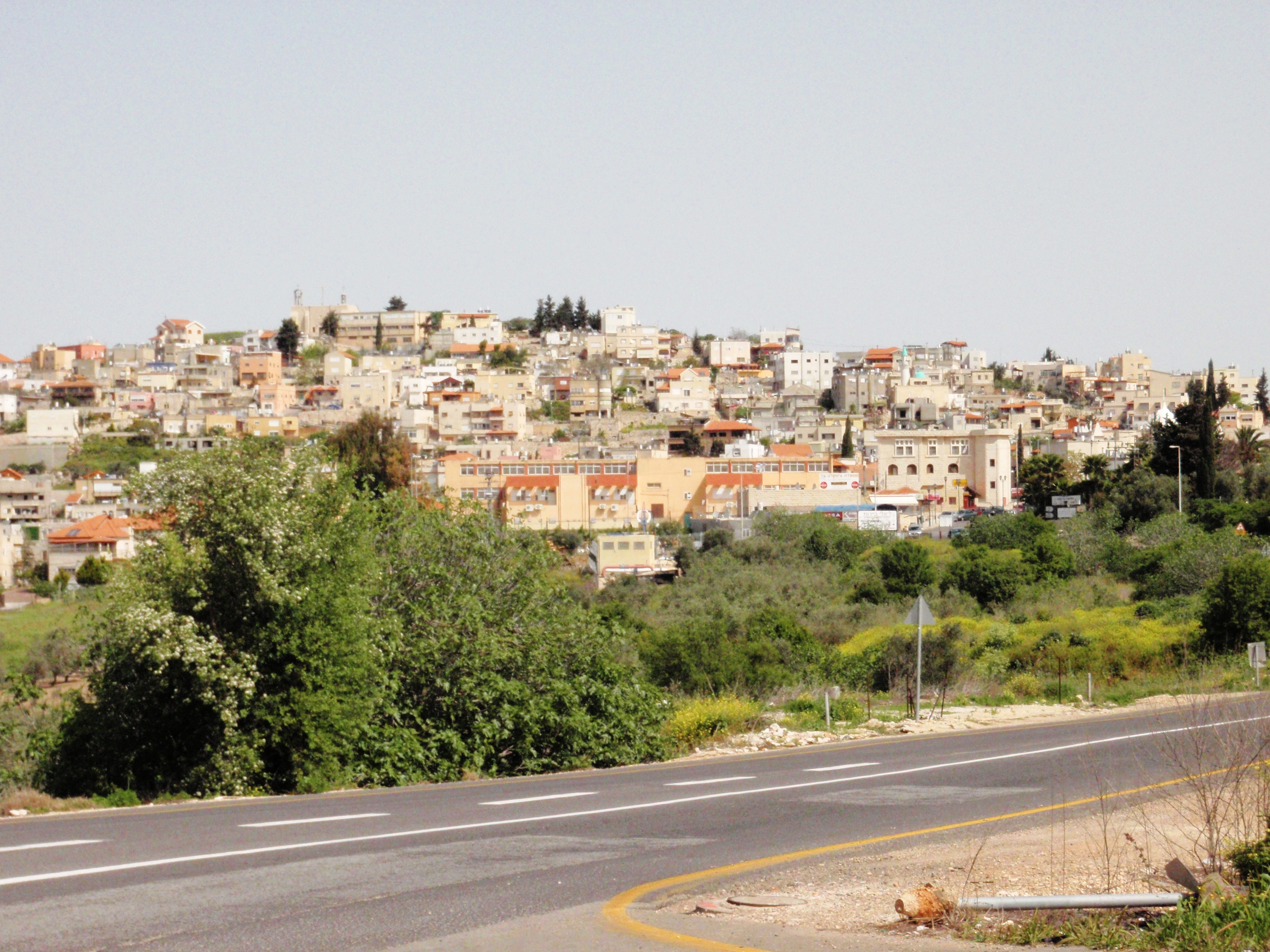

- Location within Northeast Israel Location within Israel
- Coordinates: 33°1′34″N 35°26′43″E
- Grid position: 191/270 PAL
- Country: Israel
- District: Northern
- Subdistrict: Safed
- Natural Region: Eastern Upper Galilee
- Founded: 2000 BC (Earliest settlement); 1300 BC (Gush Halav)

Government
  - Head of Municipality: Elias Elias

Area
  - Total: 6,916 dunams (6.916 km^{2}; 2.670 sq mi)

Population (2024)
  - Total: 3,243
  - Density: 468.9/km^{2} (1,214/sq mi)

Ethnicity
  - Arabs: 98.4%
  - Jews and others: 1.6%
- Name meaning: A lump of milk
- Website: www.jish.org.il

Jish (Arabic: الجش, al-Jiŝ), also known by its Hebrew name of Gush Halab (Hebrew: גּוּשׁ חָלָב, Gūŝ Ḥālāḇ), or by its classical name of Gischala, is a local council in Upper Galilee, located on the northeastern slopes of Mount Meron, 13 kilometres (8.1 mi) north of Safed, in Israel's Northern District. In 2024, it had a population of 3,243, which is predominantly Maronite Catholic and Melkite Greek Catholic Christians (63%), with a Sunni Muslim Arab minority (about 35.7%).

Jish is the ancient Giscala or Gush Halav, first mentioned in the historical record by the Roman-Jewish historian Josephus, who described it as the home of John of Giscala and the last city in the Galilee to fall to the Romans during the First Jewish–Roman War (War 4:93). Archeological excavations uncovered remains from the Canaanite and Israelite periods; later archaeological finds in Jish include two ancient synagogues, a unique mausoleum and rock-cut tombs from the Roman and Byzantine periods. Historical sources dating from the 10th-15th centuries describe Jish (Gush Halav) as a village with a strong Jewish presence.

In the early Ottoman era, Jish was wholly Muslim. In the 17th century, the village was inhabited by Druze. In 1945, under British rule, Jish had a population of 1,090 with an area of 12,602 dunams. The village was largely depopulated during the 1948 Palestine war as part of the larger 1948 Palestinian expulsion and flight. After the war Jish was resettled not only by the original inhabitants, who were largely Maronite Christians, but also by some Maronite Christians who were expelled from the razed villages of Kafr Bir'im and some Muslims who were expelled from Dallata.

In 2010, the population of Jish was 3,000. The village is a center for the Aramaic revival, an initiative by some local Maronites, now officially funded by the Israeli Ministry of Education until 8th grade in the local governmental school.

== Etymology ==
Jish is the ancient Giscala. The Arabic name el-Jish is a variation of the site's ancient name Gush Halav in Hebrew, literally "block of milk" or "a lump of milk," which may be a reference to either the production of milk and cheese (for which the village has been famous since at least the early Middle Ages) or else to the fertile surroundings, which are well-suited for various forms of agriculture. Other scholars believe the name Gush Halav refers to the light color of the local limestone, which contrasts with the dark reddish rock of the neighboring village, Ras al-Ahmar.

== History ==
=== Ancient period ===
Settlement in Jish dates back 3,000 years. The village is mentioned in the Mishnah as Gush Halav, a city "surrounded by walls since the time of Joshua Ben Nun" (m. Arakhin 9:6). Canaanite and Israelite remains from the Early Bronze and Iron Ages have also been found there.

=== Classical antiquity ===
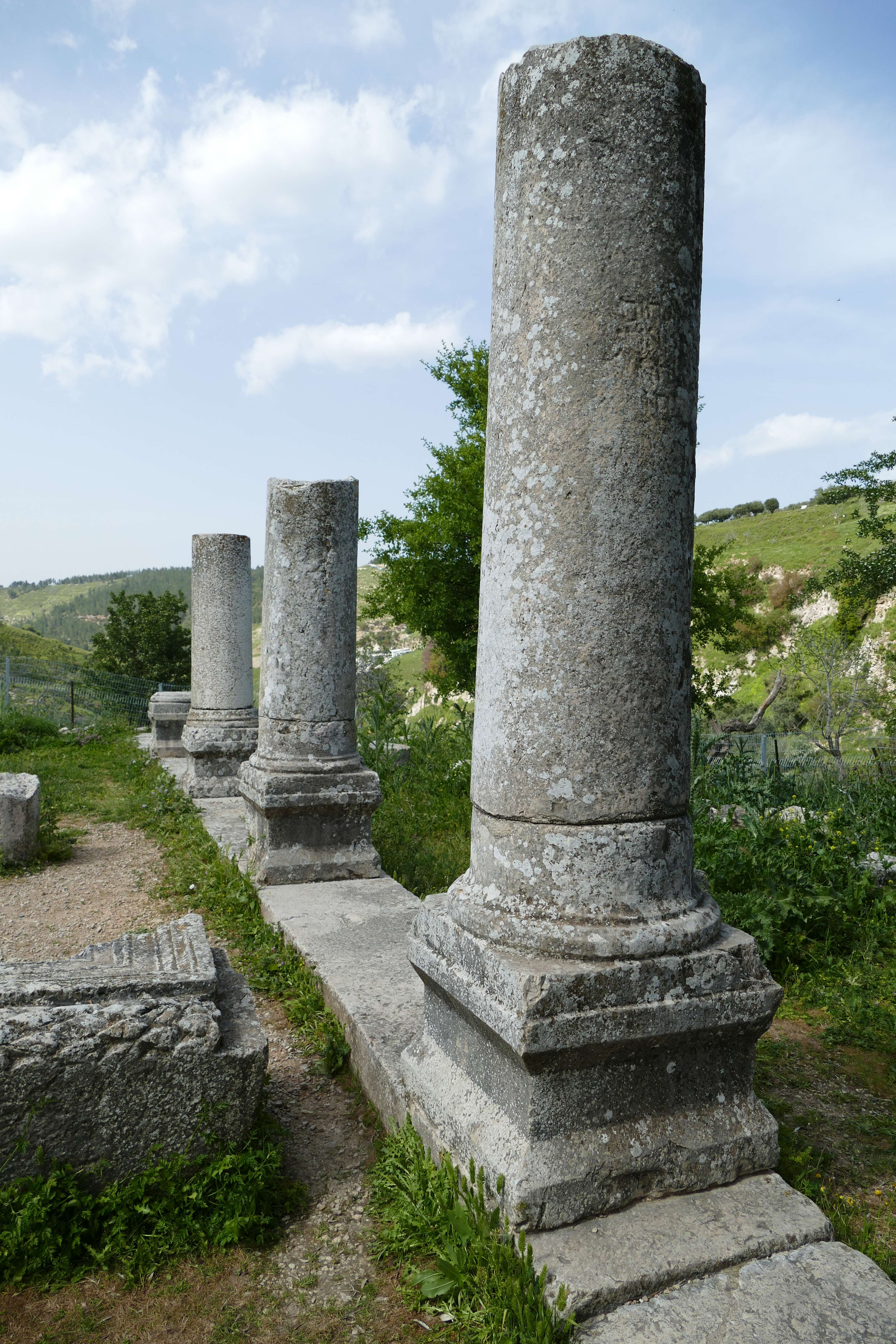
Remains of ancient synagogue, Gush Halav

During the Classical period, the town was known as Gischala, a Greek transcription of the Hebrew name Gush Halav. Both Josephus and later Jewish sources from the Roman-Byzantine period mention the fine olive oil for which the village was known. According to the Talmud, the inhabitants also engaged in the production of silk. Eleazar b. Simeon, described in the Talmud as a very large man with tremendous physical strength, was a resident of the town. According to one version of events, he was initially buried in Gush Halav but later reinterred in Meron, next to his father, Shimon bar Yochai. Jerome recorded that Paul the Apostle lived with his parents in "Giscalis in Judea," which is understood to be Gischala.

After the fall of Gamla, Gush Halav was the last Jewish stronghold in the Galilee and Golan region during the Great Jewish Revolt against Rome (66-73 CE), and the home of John of Giscala.

Two ancient synagogues were discovered at Jish. The first was located at the top of the hill, below the current Maronite Church. The second one was discovered at the foot of the hill, close to a spring; one of its columns is inscribed in Aramaic with the name of a particular "Yose son of Tanhum". This synagogue went through several phases of construction and reconstruction, one destruction being dated by excavator Eric M. Meyers to the earthquake of 551. In addition to Jewish structures and burial sites dated to the 3rd through 6th centuries, both Jewish and Christian amulets have also been discovered nearby. Christian artifacts from the Byzantine period have been found at the site.

According to local tradition, two nearby rock-cut tombs contain the graves of 1st century BCE Jewish sages Shemaiah and Avtalyon.

=== Middle Ages ===
Historical sources from the 10th to the 15th centuries describe it as a large Jewish village, and it is mentioned in the 10th century by Arab geographer Al-Muqaddasi. Jewish life in the 10th and 11th centuries is attested to by documents in the Cairo Geniza. In 1172, the Jewish traveler Benjamin of Tudela found about 20 Jews living there. In 1322, during his journey through the Land of Israel, Ishtori Haparchi noted that the Jewish community of Gush Halav read the Megillat Esther in Purim on both the 14th and the 15th of Adar.

=== Ottoman Empire ===
In 1596, Jish appeared in Ottoman tax registers as being in the Nahiya of Jira, of the Liwa Safad. It had a population of 71 households and 20 bachelors, all Muslim. The villagers paid taxes on goats and beehives, but most of its taxes were in the form of a fixed sum: total taxes amounted to around 30,750 akçe.

In the 17th century, the village had been inhabited by Druze, but they later departed from it. The Turkish traveler Evliya Çelebi, who passed by the village in 1648, wrote:

Then comes the village of Jish, with one hundred houses of accursed believers in the transmigration of souls (tenāsukhi mezhebindén). Yet what beautiful boys and girls they have! And what a climate! Every one of these girls has queenly, gazelle-like, bewitching eyes, which captivate the beholder—an unusual sight.

According to Yitzhak Ben-Zvi, Maronites first settled in Jish during the early 18th century. This may have happened as a result of the Battle of Ain Dara (1711), in which the Qaysis defeated the Yamanis and drove many of them from Mount Lebanon. Ben-Zvi recorded a local tradition, according to which two families in the village preceded the Maronite immigration; One of them—the Hashouls, the oldest family in the village— were Maronites of Jewish ancestry and were originally known by the name Shaul.

The Galilee earthquake of 1837 caused widespread damage and over 200 deaths. Three weeks afterward, contemporaries reported "a large rent in the ground...about a foot wide and fifty feet long." All the Galilee villages that were badly damaged at the time, including Jish, were situated on the slopes of steep hills. The presence of old landslides has been observed on aerial photographs. The fact that the village was built on dip slopes consisting of soft bedrock and soil has made it more vulnerable to landslides. According to Andrew Thomson, no houses in Jish were left standing. The church fell, killing 130 people, and the old town walls collapsed. A total of 235 people died, and the ground was left fissured. At the time, the village was noted as a mixed Muslim and Maronite village in the Safad district.

At the end of the 19th century, Jish was described as a "well-built village of good masonry" with about 600 Christian and 200 Muslim inhabitants.

A population list from about 1887 showed El Jish to have about 1,935 inhabitants; 975 Christians and 960 Muslims.

=== British Mandate ===
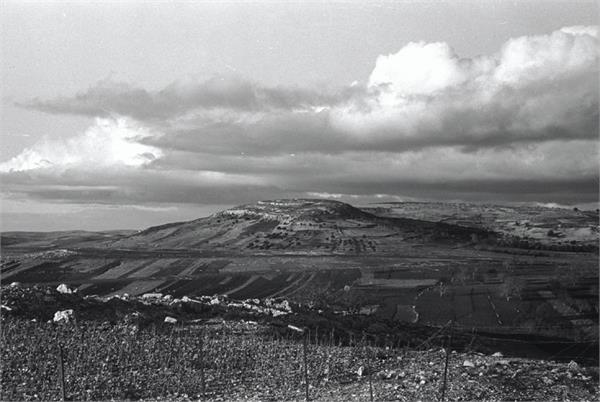
Jish 1939

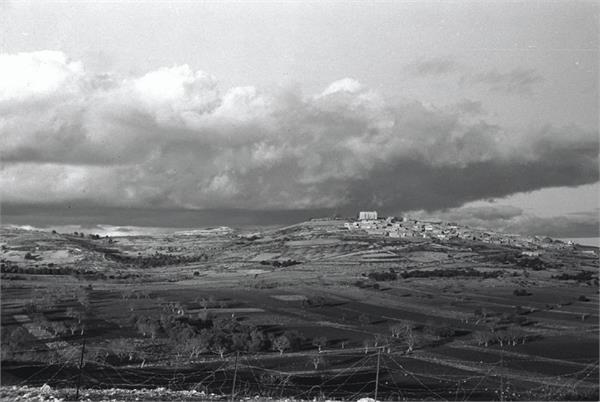
Jish 1939

At the time of the 1922 census of Palestine, Jish had a population of 721–380 Christians and 341 Muslims. The Christians were classified as 71% Maronite and 29% Greek Catholic (or Melchite). By the 1931 census, Jish had 182 inhabited houses and a population of 358 Christians and 397 Muslims.

In the 1945 statistics, Jish had a population of 1,090; 350 Christians and 740 Muslims, and the village spanned 12,602 dunams, mostly Arab-owned. Of this, 1,506 dunums were plantations and irrigable land, 6,656 used for cereals, while 72 dunams were built-up (urban) land.

=== Israel ===
==== 1948 Palestine war ====
Israeli forces captured Jish on 29 October 1948, during Operation Hiram. A massacre was perpetrated by Israeli troops. Historian Saleh Abdel Jawad has estimated "at least 100 fatalities". (Note: Saleh Abdel Jawad, 2007, Zionist Massacres: the Creation of the Palestinian Refugee Problem in the 1948 War. "Indiscriminate killings and killings of prisoners occur. Sources emphasise different details, but agree that civilians and fighters who had surrendered are rounded up and killed. Those killed include four Maronite Christians, a woman and her baby, ten Moroccan prisoners, and surrendered soldiers. There are at least 100 fatalities (author's estimate).") Historian Benny Morris wrote that "the troops apparently murdered about 10 Moroccan POWs (who had served with the Syrian Army) and a number of civilians, including, apparently, four Maronite Christians, and a woman and her baby."

The Israeli prime minister, David Ben-Gurion, ordered an investigation of the deaths but no IDF soldiers were brought to trial, though a military investigation concluded with the order that those responsible for the unjustified killings were to be tried 'immediately'. Moreover, Mordechai Maklef, then an operations officer on the Northern Front (and later IDF chief of staff), revealed that in some operations “the potential enemy” was eliminated, meaning civilians. He cited cases including Safsaf, Jish, Eilabun, Lod, Ramla, and larger-scale actions in the south, adding that the intention was expulsion and implying that mass displacement could not be carried out without such acts of terrrorism (טרור).

Many of the residents of Jish were forced to leave the village in 1948 and became Palestinian refugees in Lebanon. Some Christians from the nearby town of Kafr Bir'im resettled in Jish, where today they are citizens of Israel, but continue to press for their right of return to their former villages. In October 1950, Israeli forces raided Jish and detained seven suspected smugglers who were stripped, bound, and beaten. They were released without charge.

Elias Chacour, now Archbishop of the Melkite Greek Catholic Church, whose family resettled in Jish, wrote that when he was eight years old he discovered a mass grave containing two dozen bodies.

==== 21st century ====
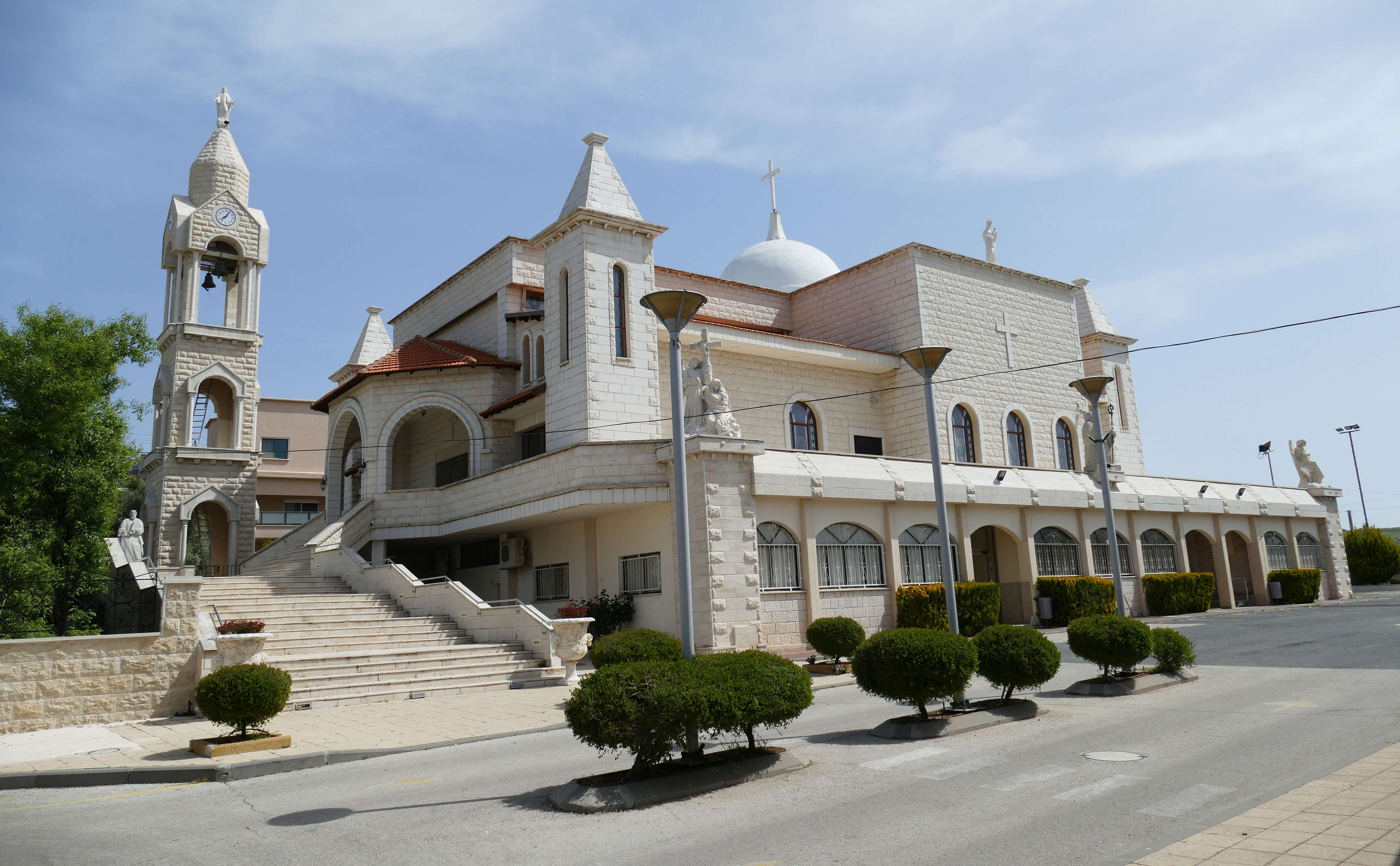
Mar Maroun Maronite Church in Jish, 2019

In December 2010, a hiking and bicycle path known as the Coexistence Trail was inaugurated, linking Jish with Dalton, a neighboring Jewish village. The 2,500 meter-long trail, accessible to people with disabilities, sits 850 meters above sea level and has several lookout points, including a view of Dalton Lake, where rainwater is collected and stored for agricultural use.

Jish is known for its efforts to revive Aramaic as a living language. In 2011, the Israeli Ministry of Education approved a program to teach the language in Jish elementary schools. Some local Maronite activists in Jish say that Aramaic is essential to their existence as a people, in the same way that Hebrew and Arabic are for Jews and Arabs.

== Demographics ==
Today, 55% of the inhabitants of Jish are Maronite Christians, 10% percent are Melkites and 35% percent are Muslims. The population of the village was 3,243.

In 2022, 63% of the population was Christian and 37% was Muslim.

== Geography ==
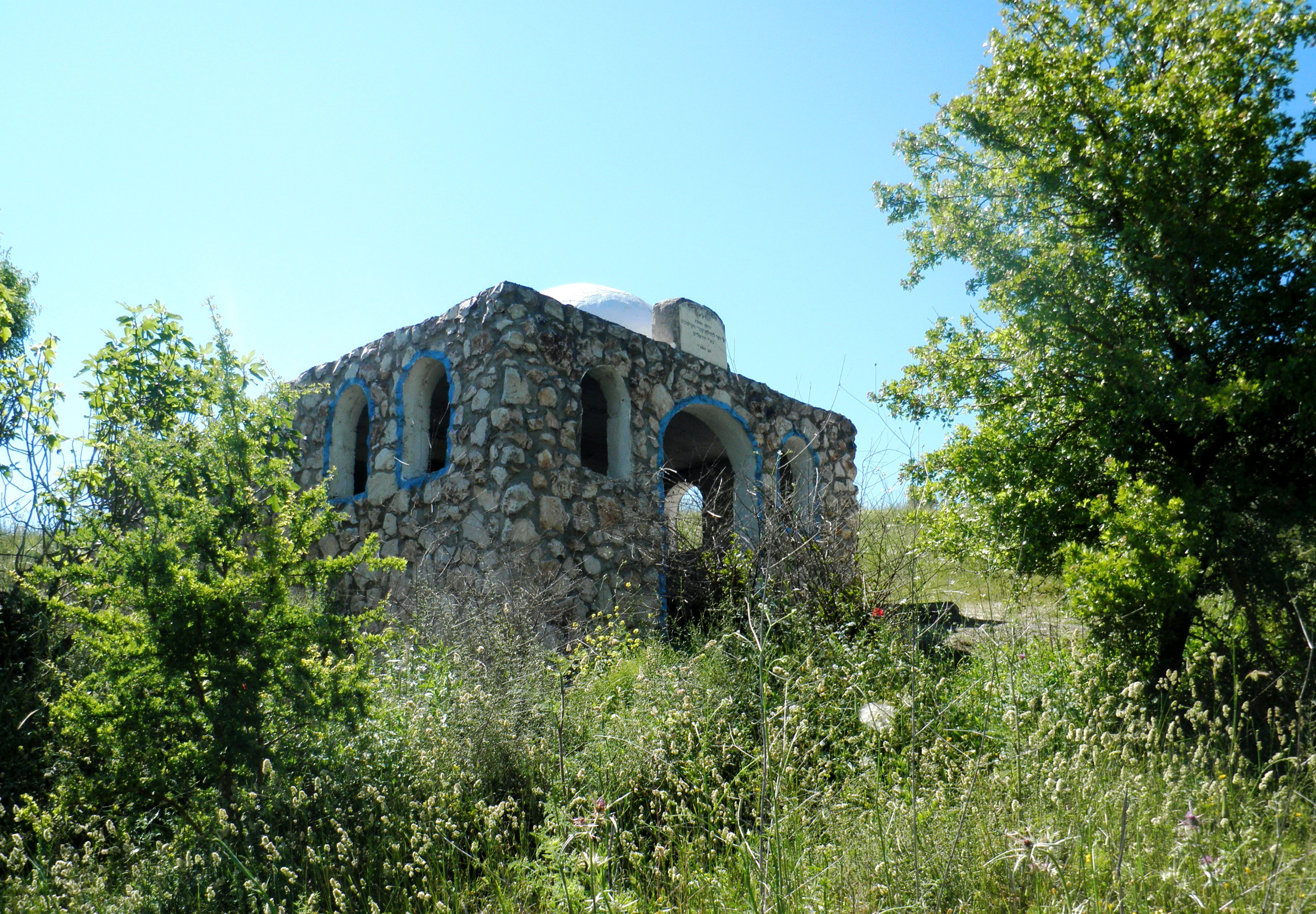
Tomb of the Prophet Joel in Jish

Jish is located in Upper Galilee, in the Northern district of Israel. The town is close to Mount Meron, the tallest standing mountain of Galilee. Recently, a new road has connected Jish with the nearby Jewish village of Dalton.

== Religious sites and shrines ==
The tombs of Shmaya and Abtalion, a pair of Jewish sages who taught in Jerusalem in the early 1st century BCE, are located in Jish.

According to tradition, the Israelite prophet Joel was also buried there. The structure traditionally believed to be his tomb is situated on the western outskirts of the modern village, and contains several ancient rock-cut tombs.

According to Christian tradition, the parents of Saint Paul were from Jish. John of Giscala, the son of Levi, was born in Jish. Other churches in Jish are a small Maronite Church that was rebuilt after the 1837 earthquake and the Elias Church, the largest in the village, which operates a convent.

== Archaeology ==
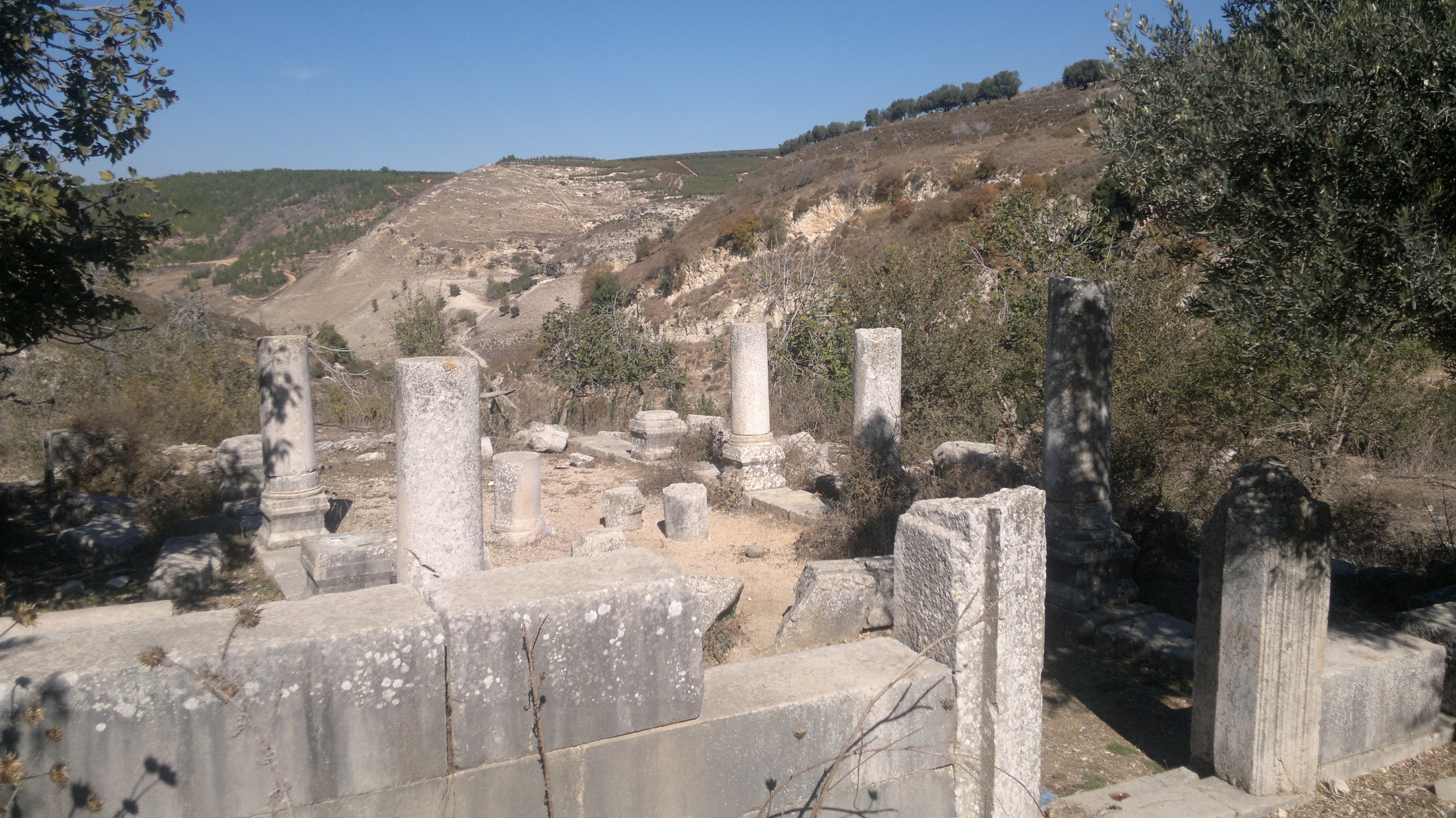
Remains of Gush Halav synagogue

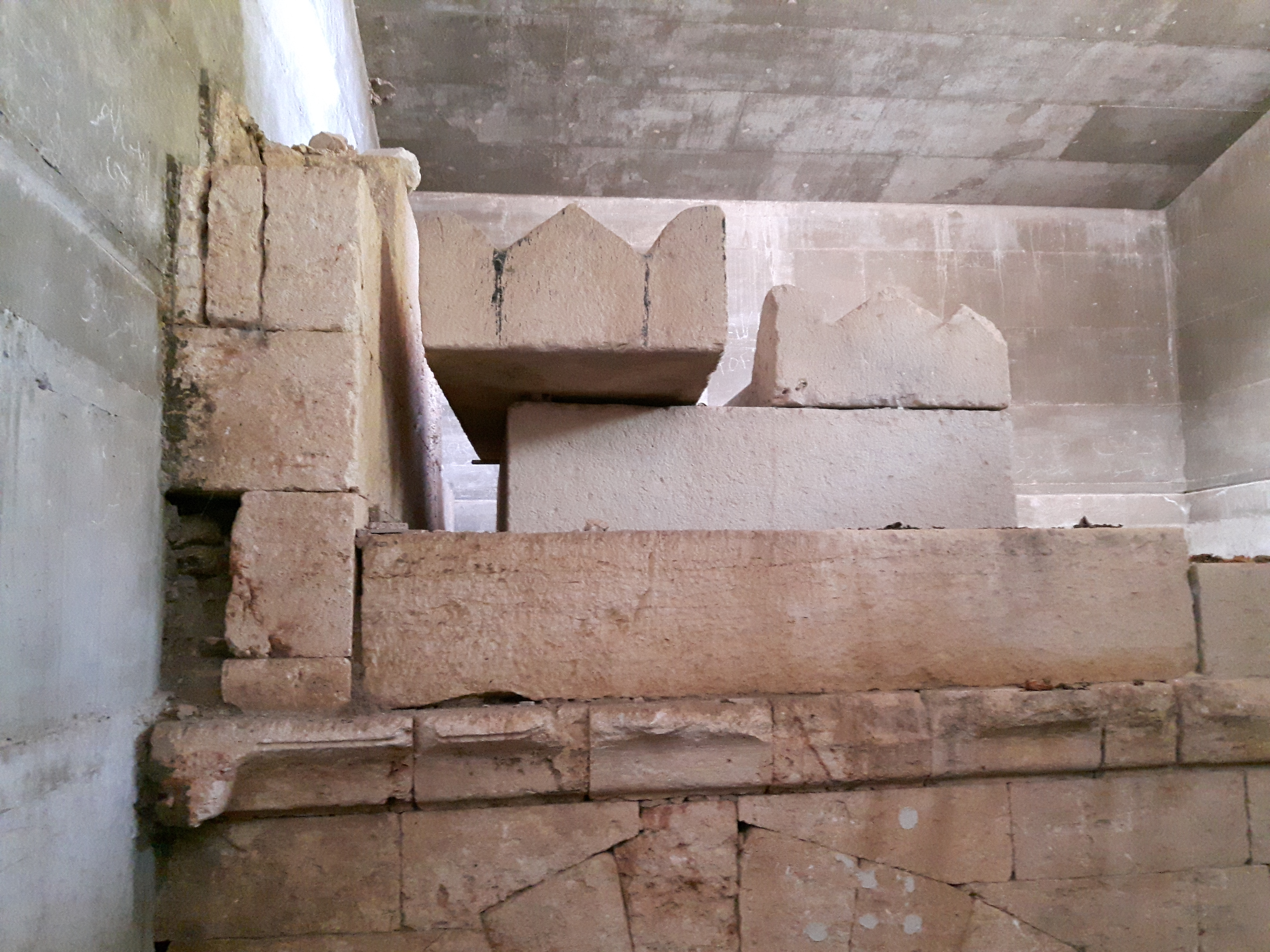
The Mausoleum in Jish

Eighteen archaeological sites have been excavated to date in Jish and vicinity. Archaeologists have excavated two synagogues in use since the Roman and Byzantine periods (3rd to 6th centuries CE). One synagogue is located at the top of the village and the other east of it. On the remains of the upper synagogue, found by Kitchener of the Palestine Exploration Fund, the Melkite Greek Catholic Church of Mar Boutros was built. Jewish-Christian amulets were discovered nearby.

Coins indicate that Jish had strong commercial ties with the nearby city of Tyre. On Jish's western slope, a mausoleum was excavated, with stone sarcophagi similar to those seen at the large Jewish catacomb at Beit She'arim National Park. The inner part of the mausoleum contained ten hewn loculi, burial niches known in Hebrew as kokhim. In the mausoleum, archaeologists found several skeletons, oil lamps and a glass bottle dating to the fourth century CE.

A network of secret caves and passageways in Jish, some of them located under private homes, is strikingly similar to hideaways in the Judean lowlands used during the Bar Kokhba revolt.

== Voting Patterns ==
In the 2026 election, 75 percent of voters in Jish voted for the Arab parties, while 21 percent voted for the parties of the center-left coalition led by Gadi Eisenkot and 2 percent voted for the parties of the right-wing coalition led by Benjamin Netanyahu. Among the voters for the Arab parties, 82 percent voted for the Joint List, while 18 percent voted for Ra'am. Voter turnout increased 51 percent from the 2022 election.

== See also ==
- Ancient synagogues in the Palestine region - covers entire Palestine region/Land of Israel
  - Ancient synagogues in Israel - covers the modern State of Israel
- Hanna Jubran
- Elinor Joseph
- Arab localities in Israel
- Population displacements in Israel after 1948
- Arameans in Israel
- Nahal Gush Halav

== Bibliography ==
- Barron, J.B., ed. (1923). Palestine: Report and General Abstracts of the Census of 1922. Government of Palestine.
- Conder, C.R.; Kitchener, H.H. (1881). The Survey of Western Palestine: Memoirs of the Topography, Orography, Hydrography, and Archaeology. Vol. 1. London: Committee of the Palestine Exploration Fund.
- Department of Statistics (1945). Village Statistics, April, 1945. Government of Palestine.
- Gelber, Y. (2001), Palestine 1948, Sussex Academic Press
- Getzov, Nimrod (2010-12-23). "Gush Halav Final Report" (122). Hadashot Arkheologiyot – Excavations and Surveys in Israel.
- Guérin, V. (1880). Description Géographique Historique et Archéologique de la Palestine (in French). Vol. 3: Galilee, pt. 2. Paris: L'Imprimerie Nationale. (p. 94 ff)
- Hadawi, S. (1970). Village Statistics of 1945: A Classification of Land and Area ownership in Palestine. Palestine Liberation Organization Research Center.
- Hartal, Moshe (2006-09-06). "Gush Halav (A) Final Report" (118). Hadashot Arkheologiyot – Excavations and Surveys in Israel.
- Hartal, Moshe (2006-11-09). "Gush Halav (B) Final Report" (118). Hadashot Arkheologiyot – Excavations and Surveys in Israel.
- Hartal, Moshe (2006-11-19). "Gush Halav (C) Final Report" (118). Hadashot Arkheologiyot – Excavations and Surveys in Israel.
- Hütteroth, W.-D.; Abdulfattah, K. (1977). Historical Geography of Palestine, Transjordan and Southern Syria in the Late 16th Century. Erlanger Geographische Arbeiten, Sonderband 5. Erlangen, Germany: Vorstand der Fränkischen Geographischen Gesellschaft. ISBN 3-920405-41-2.
- Mills, E., ed. (1932). Census of Palestine 1931. Population of Villages, Towns and Administrative Areas. Jerusalem: Government of Palestine.
- Morris, B. (1993). Israel's Border Wars, 1949 - 1956. Arab Infiltration, Israeli Retaliation, and the Countdown to the Suez War. Oxford University Press. ISBN 0-19-827850-0.
- Morris, B. (2004). The Birth of the Palestinian Refugee Problem Revisited. Cambridge University Press. ISBN 978-0-521-00967-6.
- Mukaddasi (1886). Description of Syria, including Palestine. London: Palestine Pilgrims' Text Society.
- Palmer, E.H. (1881). The Survey of Western Palestine: Arabic and English Name Lists Collected During the Survey by Lieutenants Conder and Kitchener, R. E. Transliterated and Explained by E.H. Palmer. Committee of the Palestine Exploration Fund.
- Pesikta de-Rav Kahana (1949). Salomon Buber (ed.). (Pesiqata Derav Kahana) (PDF) (in Hebrew). New York. OCLC 232694058. (reprinted in 1980)
- Rhode, H. (1979). Administration and Population of the Sancak of Safed in the Sixteenth Century (PhD). Columbia University. Archived from the original on 2020-03-01.
- Robinson, E.; Smith, E. (1841). Biblical Researches in Palestine, Mount Sinai and Arabia Petraea: A Journal of Travels in the year 1838. Vol. 3. Boston: Crocker & Brewster.
- Schumacher, G. (1888). "Population list of the Liwa of Akka". Quarterly Statement - Palestine Exploration Fund. 20: 169–191.
- Stephan, Stephan H. (1937). "Evliya Tshelebi's Travels in Palestine, IV". The Quarterly of the Department of Antiquities in Palestine. 6: 84–97.
