= Jose ben Joezer =

Jose ben Joezer (also spelled Yose ben Yoezer) was a rabbi of the early Maccabean period, possibly a disciple of Antigonus of Soko and member of the ascetic group known as the Hasidæans, though neither is certain. He belonged to a priestly family.

== Biography ==
With him and Jose ben Johanan of Jerusalem, his colleague, begins the period known in Jewish history as that of the zugot (duumvirate), which ended with Hillel and Shammai. According to an old tradition, the member of the "zugot" mentioned first occupied the office of Nasi (president) of the Sanhedrin, while the one mentioned second served in the capacity of vice-president.

Jose belonged to the party of the Ḥasidim, and was a decided adversary of Hellenism. To prevent Jews from settling beyond Judea he declared all pagan countries "unclean". He declared also glass utensils "unclean", probably because they were manufactured in pagan countries. In other respects, however, he was very liberal, and received the surname "Sharaya" ("one who permits") for having rendered three liberal decisions on certain ritual questions. The first halakic controversy known in the Talmud was that between Jose ben Joezer and his colleague Jose ben Johanan. It arose over the question whether the laying of hands on the heads of the sacrifices is permitted on feast-days.

Jose ben Joezer was distinguished for his piety, and is called "the most pious in the priesthood" ("hasid shebikechunnah"). He professed great veneration for scholars, one of his sayings being: "Let thy house be a meeting-place for the wise; powder thyself in the dust of their feet, and drink their words with eagerness"

=== Death ===
Jose was probably among the sixty pious men who, at the instigation of the high priest Alcimus, the son of his sister, were crucified by the Syrian general Bacchides. The Midrash reports the following dialogue between Alcimus and Jose ben Joezer while the latter was on the way to execution:

Alcimus: "See the profit and honors that have fallen to my lot in consequence of what I have done, whilst thou, for thy obstinacy, hast the misfortune to die as a criminal."

Yose, quietly: "if such is the lot of those who anger God, what shall be the lot of those who accomplish His will?"

Alcimus: "Is there any one who accomplished His will more than thou?"

Yose: "If this is the end of those who accomplish His will, what awaits those who anger Him?"

On this Alcimus was seized with remorse and committed suicide: "He went and subjected himself to all four modes of execution inflicted by the Beth Din: stoning, burning, beheading, and strangulation. What did he do [to accomplish this]? He took a beam and stuck it in the ground, attached a rope to it, set up logs [in front of it], and built a stone wall around it. He then made a bonfire [with the logs] and stuck a sword in the middle. He then hanged himself with the rope, and while he was strangling the rope burnt through and snapped, he fell on the sword, while the wall [of stones] fell upon him and he burned [in the fire]." Jose ben Joezer left a son, whom he had disinherited for bad conduct.

Unknown	Nasi; 170 BCE - 140 BCE	Succeeded by Joshua ben Perachiah
