= Nityananda (disambiguation) =

Nityananda (born circa 1474) was the primary religious figure within the Gaudiya Vaishnava tradition of Hinduism.

The Indian name Nityananda (Sanskrit: nitya, eternal + ānanda, bliss) may also refer to:

- Bhagawan Nityananda (1897–1961), an Indian guru from Maharashtra
- Soniya Nityanand, Vice Chancellor of King George's Medical University, Lucknow
- Nityanand Swami (Paramhansa) (1754–1850), a Hindu saint
- Nityanand Swami (politician) (1927–2012), an Indian politician and the first chief minister of the Indian state Uttaranchal
- Nityananda Mohapatra (1912–2012), an Indian politician, poet and journalist from Orissa
- Nityananda Palit (1923–1990), an Indian playwright, actor and director
- Nitya Anand (1925–2024), an Indian scientist
- Nithyananda (born 1978), an Indian guru from Tamil Nadu

== See also ==
- Nithya (disambiguation)
- Ananda (disambiguation)
