= Hanna Jubran =

Palestinian Arab Israeli sculptor

Hanna Jubran (Arabic: حنا جبران, Hebrew: חנה ג'ובראן) is a Palestinian Arab Israeli sculptor, born in Jish, the upper Galilee. His work addresses the concepts of time, movement, balance and space. Each sculpture occupies and creates its own reality influenced by its immediate surroundings. The work does not rely on one media to evoke the intended response, but takes advantage of compatible materials such as, wood, granite, steel, iron and bronze.

He received his M.F.A. in 1983 in sculpture from the University of Wisconsin–Milwaukee and is currently a Sculpture Professor and Sculpture Area Coordinator at East Carolina University in Greenville, North Carolina.

== International art shows, competitions and symposia ==
The International Sculpture Symposium in Granby, Quebec, Canada, The Ecatepec, Mexico International Monumental Sculpture Symposium, The Toyamura International Sculpture Biennial at Toyamura Village, Japan, The International Sculpture Symposium and Conference at Europos Parkas in Vilnius, Lithuania, The Second International Invitational Iron Sculpture Exhibition and Iron Pour at Tallinn University in Tallinn, Estonia, and The International Woodcarving Symposium in Kemivarji, Finland. A recent commission Hanna just completed can be found on the grounds of Fayetteville State University, in Fayetteville, North Carolina. It is a nine-segmented concrete sculpture and reaches 11’ in height. Hanna is consistent, in his pursuit of creating enjoyable sculptures for private and corporate collections.

== Research awards ==
- 2003- University of Wisconsin – Milwaukee Distinguished Alumnus Award, Milwaukee, Wisconsin
- 2002–Artist Fellowship Award at The Southeastern College Art Conference, Mobile, Alabama
- 2002–The ECU Five-Year Achievement Award, Greenville, North Carolina
- 2001- VCAA Teacher Scholar Award, East Carolina University, Greenville, North Carolina
- 2001-Outstanding Artistic Achievement Award at The Southeastern College Art Conference, Columbia, South Carolina
- 2000- The Board of Governors Teaching Award
- 2000-01- East Carolina University Alumni Distinguished Professor for Teaching Award Finalist, East Carolina University, Greenville, North Carolina

== Professional memberships ==
- 1999–2007 Who’s who in American Art
- 1998 –2007 Member of SECAC – Southern College Art Conference
- 1998–2003 Member and Director of the International Association for Monumental Sculpture Events. Granby Canada
- 1997–2007 Member of Phi-Beta Delta Gamma Rho Chapter
- 1997–2007 Member the International Sculpture Center, New York
- 1994 –2007 Member of Tri-State Sculptors Educational Association
- 1982–2007 Member of College Art Association, New York.

== Exhibition awards ==
- 2007 – Purchase Award, JUST- Jackson Union Sculpture Tour, Jackson, Tennessee
- 2004 – Artist choice and 3rd Place Chaco Argentina Sculpture Biennal, Chaco, Argentina
- 2004 – 1st. Place 3D, Sculpture Salmagundi VIII Indoor Exhibition, Rocky Mount, North Carolina
- 2004 – Best in Show, The down East Sculpture Exhibition, Greenville, North Carolina
- 2003 – Purchase Award, Yuzi Paradise Sculpture Competition, China
- 2003 – Semi-Grand Prize in the Toyamura International Sculpture Biennale, Hokkaido, Japan
- 2001- Merit Award – 29th Annual Competition North Carolina Artists, Fayetteville, North Carolina
- 2000 – Best Execution of Concept, Ma'llot International Sculpture Symposium 2000, Ma'llot, Israel
- 2000 – Best of Show, Salmagundi Outdoor Sculpture Show, Rocky Mount, North Carolina

== Selected commissions and collections ==
- 2007 – JUST- Jackson Union Sculpture Tour, 18’ steel and paint sculpture, Jackson, Tennessee
- 2005 – First Flight Rotary & Icarus International Time Capsule, Kitty Hawk, North Carolina
- 2003 – Monument to a Century of Flight (14, 10’-20’ stainless steel pylons) Kitty Hawk, North Carolina
- 2002 – Presbyterian College Scotsman (12’ bronze casting) – Clinton, South Carolina
- 2002 – Stone&Iron sculpture for Griffis Sculpture Park, East Otto, New York
- 2001 – William E. Laupus Health Sciences Library (54" bronze casting) Greenville, North Carolina
- 2001 – Kinston Art Center – Community Artistic Bench (8'X8' welded Steel & Concrete)
- 2001 – Davidson College Wildcat (11' bronze casting) – Davidson, North Carolina
- 2001 – Steel Sculpture for Burlington College, Burlington, New Jersey
- 2000 – Jesse Helms Archive Center – Bald Eagle (22' wingspan cast bronze) Wingate, North Carolina
- 2000 – Bronze Sculpture, East Carolina University Chancellor's office, Greenville, North Carolina
- 1999 – Bronze Sculpture, Town of Nags Head Municipal Building, Nags Head, North Carolina
- 1999 – Soapstone and Bronze Sculpture, Wright State University, Dayton, Ohio
- 1999 – Steel Sculpture, Washburn University, Topeka, Kansas
- 1999 – Alabaster sculpture, Greenville Museum of Art, Greenville, North Carolina
- 1998 – Ecatepec International Monumental Sculpture Symposium, Ecatepec, Mexico
- 1998 – Large Outdoor Steel Sculpture, Association d’Eve’nements Internationauxde Sculpture
- Monumentale, Granby, Quebec, Canada
- 1997 – Large outdoor concrete sculpture, Fayetteville University, Fayetteville, North Carolina

== Monumental collections and symposia ==
- 2006 – Ventspils Granite Boulder Sculpture Symposium, Ventspils, Latvia
- 2006 – Chaco, Argentina Sculpture Biennal, Chaco, Argentina
- 2005 – 9th Internationales Holzbildhauer Symposium, St. Blasien, Germany
- 2004 – Pedvale Sculpture Park “Prime Elements of the World” Sabile, Latvia
- 2004 – Tijuana – San Diego Park – Permanent Collection Gani Sculpture Garden, San Diego, California
- 2004 – Chaco, Argentina Sculpture Biennal, Chaco, Argentina
- 2003 – Pirrkala International Sculpture Park. Pirrkala, Finland
- 2003 – International Monumental Sculpture Symposium, Tultepec, Mexico
- 2002 – 1st. Annual Griffis Sculpture Park Symposium, East Otto, New York
- 2001 – International Monumental Sculpture Symposium, Tultepec, Mexico
- 2001 – 13th international Woodcarving Symposium, Kemijarvi, Finland
- 2000 – Ma'llot International Stone Carving Symposium, Ma'llot, Israel
- 2000 – Jish, Israel Stone Carving Symposium 2000, Jish Israel
- 2000 – International Monumental Sculpture Symposium, Tultepec, Mexico
- 2000 – International Monumental Sculpture Symposium, Granby, Canada
- 1999 – 4th Monumental International Stone Carving Symposium, Cayo Largo, Cuba
- 1999- 12th International Woodcarving Symposium, Kemijarvi, Finland
- 1999 – 7th International Trae Skulptur Symposium, Hojer, Denmark
- 1999 – 8th International Woodsculpting Symposium, Breckenridge, Colorado
- 1998 – Ecatepec International Monumental Sculpture Symposium, Ecatepec, Mexico
- 1998 – Large Outdoor Steel Sculpture, Association d’Eve’nements Internationauxde Sculpture

Monumentale, Granby, Quebec, Canada

- 1998 – 7th International Wood sculpting Symposium, Breckenridge, Colorado
- 1998 – 6th International Trae Skulptur Symposium, Hojer, Denmark
- 1998 – 3rd International Woodcarving Symposium & Competition, St. Blasien, Germany
- 1997 – 6th International Wood sculpting Symposium. Breckenridge, Colorado
- 1997- 11th International Woodcarving Symposium, Kemijarvi, Finland

== Selected international exhibitions ==
- 2007 – Toyamura International Sculpture Biennale, Hokkaido, Japan
- 2003 – Yuzi Paradise Sculpture Exhibition and Competition, China
- 2002 – Murray State University – Murray, Kentucky (January 27 – March 10)
- 2001 – Navy Pier – Maquette – 3D-Chicago, Chicago, Illinois
- 2001 – National Cheng Kung University Tainan, Taiwan
- 2001 – International Wood sculpting Exhibition, Kemijarvi, Finland
- 2001 – International Monumental Sculpture Exhibition, Mexico City, Mexico
- 2000 – The 7th International Shoebox Sculpture Exhibition, Honolulu, Hawaii
- 1999 – Sculpture for the Blind, "Licht Pause" Ehrenfelder Hochbunker, Cologne, Germany
- 1999 – "American Kaleidscope" Erkelenz, Germany
- 1999 – The 12th International Sculpture Exhibition, Kemijarvi, Finland
- 1998 – Small Bronze Sculpture Exhibition, Granby, Quebec, Canada
- 1997 – The 11th International Woodcarving Symposium and Exhibition, Kemijarvi, Finland

== Selected solo exhibitions ==
- 2006 -Solo Exhibition – Arts Council of Wayne County, Goldsboro, North Carolina
- 2006- Solo Exhibition – Imperial Center for the Arts and Sciences, Rocky Mount, North Carolina
- 2006 – Solo Exhibition- Spiers Gallery Brevard College, Brevard, North Carolina
- 2005 – Solo Exhibition – Ghost Fleet Gallery, Nags Head, North Carolina
- 2004 – Solo Exhibition – Greenville Technical College – Greer, South Carolina
- 2003 – Solo Exhibition – Fayetteville Museum of Art – Fayetteville, North Carolina
- 2003 – Solo Exhibition – Elon University, Elon, North Carolina
- 2003 – Solo Exhibition – Kinston Arts Council – Kinston, North Carolina
- 2003 – Solo Exhibition – UNC Raleigh – Raleigh, North Carolina
- 2002 – Solo Exhibition – Manteo Art Center – Manteo, North Carolina
- 2001 – Exhibition of New work, Concordia University, Milwaukee, Wisconsin
- 2001 – Exhibition of New work, Lee Hensley Gallery, Raleigh, North Carolina
- 2001 – Exhibition of New work, Simmons Gallery, Durham, North Carolina
- 2001 – Exhibition of New work, Illinois Central College, Peoria, Illinois
- 2000 – Exhibition of New work, the Rocky Mount Arts Center, Rocky Mount, North Carolina
- 2000 – Exhibition of Bronze Wall relief Sculptures, Duke University, Chapel Hill, North Carolina
- 1999 – Exhibition of New Work in Bronze and Soapstone, Sinclair Community College, Dayton, Ohio
- 1999 – Exhibition of New Work in bronze and soapstone, Mendenhall Student Center, Greenville, North Carolina
- 1999 – Exhibition of New Work in Soapstone and Bronze, Greenville Museum of Art, Greenville, North Carolina
- 1998 – Exhibition, New Works in Bronze, Art Elements Gallery, Mequon, Wisconsin
- 1998 – Exhibition of Bronze & Marble Sculpture, Berea College Art Dept., Berea, Kentucky
- 1998 – Exhibition of Bronze and Marble Sculpture, Greenville, Art Museum, Greenville, North Carolina
- 1997 – Exhibition of Bronze & Marble Sculpture, Ghost Fleet Gallery, Nags Head, North Carolina
- 1997 – Exhibition of Bronze Sculpture & Wall Relief, Goldsboro Arts Council, Goldsboro, North Carolina
- 1997 – Exhibition of Bronze Casting and Stone Carving, Kinston Art Center, Kinston, North Carolina

== Selected national exhibitions ==
- 2006 – The Fifth Annual Florida Outdoor Sculpture Competition, Polk Museum of Art, Lakeland, Florida
- 2005 – The Fourth Annual Florida Outdoor Sculpture Competition, Polk Museum of Art, Lakeland, Florida
- 2004 – Sculpture Vision 2004, Chappel Hill, North Carolina
- 2001 – 4th Annual Southern Conference Members Juried Exhibition, Columbia, South Carolina
- 2001 – Iron Tribe Exhibit, Highlands University, Las Vegas, New Mexico
- 1999 – "CCA 99' 18th Annual National Competition" Community Council for the Arts, Kinston, North Carolina
- 1999 – "The 14th Annual Indoor/Outdoor Sculpture Celebration" Lenoir, North Carolina
- 1998 – Works by Six North Carolina Sculptors, Wilson Arts Council Gallery, Wilson, North Carolina
- 1998 – The 41st. Annual Art Show, Rocky Mount Arts Center, Rocky Mount, North Carolina
- 1998 – The Third Annual “Artist’s Self Portrait” Exhibition & Competition, Ghost Fleet Gallery,

Nags Head, North Carolina

- 1996–97 Outdoor Sculpture Exhibition & Competition, Burlington County College, Pemberton, New Jersey
- 1996 – Second Mass Sculpture Exhibition & Competition, Center for Creative Art, Greensboro, North Carolina
- 1996 – 17th Annual National Juried Fine Arts Exhibition, Goldsboro, North Carolina
- 1996 – Spotlight 96' National American Craft Council, Louisville, Kentucky
- 1996 – 61st National Juried Exhibition, Cooperstown Art association, Cooperstown, New York
- 1996 – 1996 MONARCH National Ceramic Competition, Kennedy Douglas Center for the Arts, Florence, Alabama
- 1996 – CCA National Competition & Exhibition 96', Kinston Art Council Gallery, Kinston, North Carolina
- 1995 – Tri-State Art Exhibition, Gray gallery, East Carolina University, Greenville, North Carolina
- 1995 – The 18th Fine Arts Competition and Exhibition, University of Wisconsin, Milwaukee, Wisconsin
- 1995 – 16th National Juried Fine Arts Exhibition, Goldsboro, North Carolina
