= Prophet Joel (Michelangelo) =

Fresco on the Sistine Chapel ceiling

The Prophet Joel
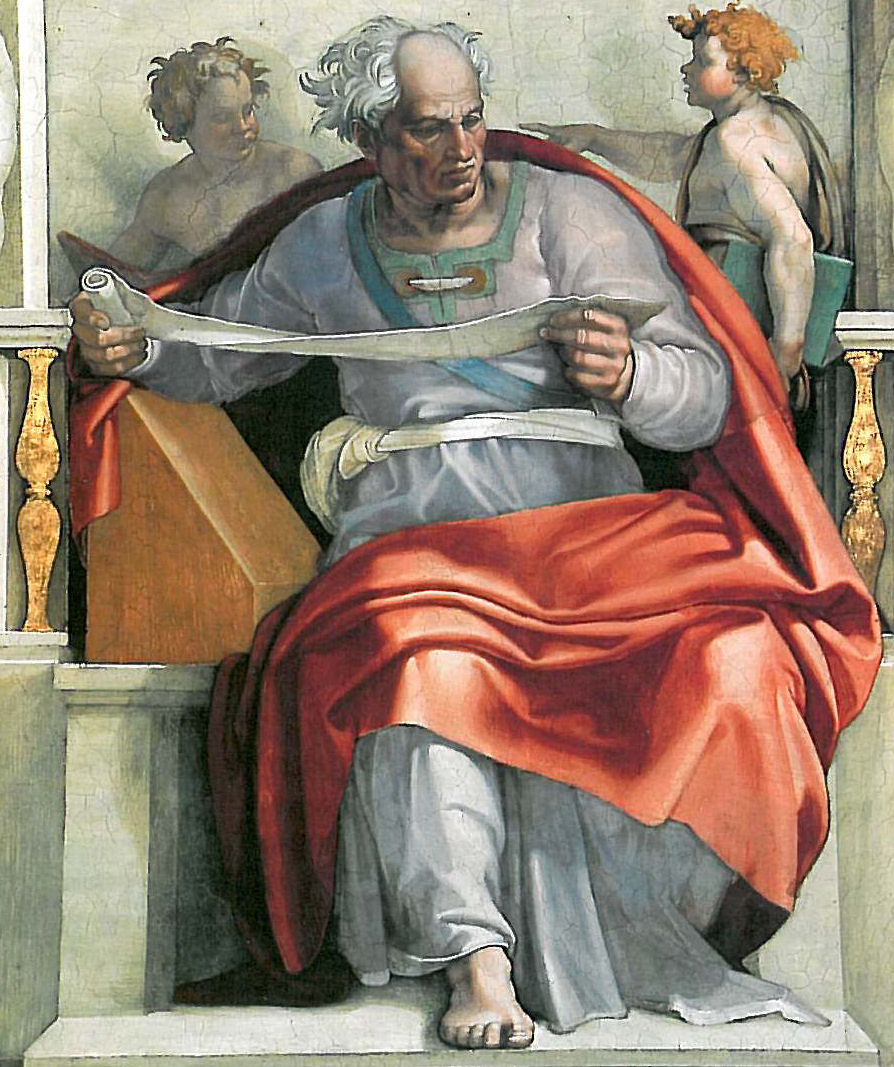
- Artist: Michelangelo
- Year: circa 1508–1512
- Type: Fresco
- Dimensions: 390 cm × 380 cm (150 in × 150 in)
- Location: Sistine Chapel, Vatican Palace; Vatican City

The Prophet Joel is one of the seven Old Testament prophets painted by the Italian High Renaissance master Michelangelo (c. 1508–1512) on the Sistine Chapel ceiling. The Sistine Chapel is in Vatican Palace, in the Vatican City.

This particular fresco imagines the person of Joel, a prophet from the Hebrew Bible, whose teachings appear in the Book of Joel. Critics have often commented on the rhythmic posture of the figure, and the artist's use of several inner horizontal lines for the clothing, which stands out when compared to some of the other frescoes. But the most engaging part of the fresco is the face of the central figure, a portrait of the architect Bramante, which appears to reveal wisdom, disdain and intense focus all at once; the open scroll in his hands only enhancing this sense of wisdom.

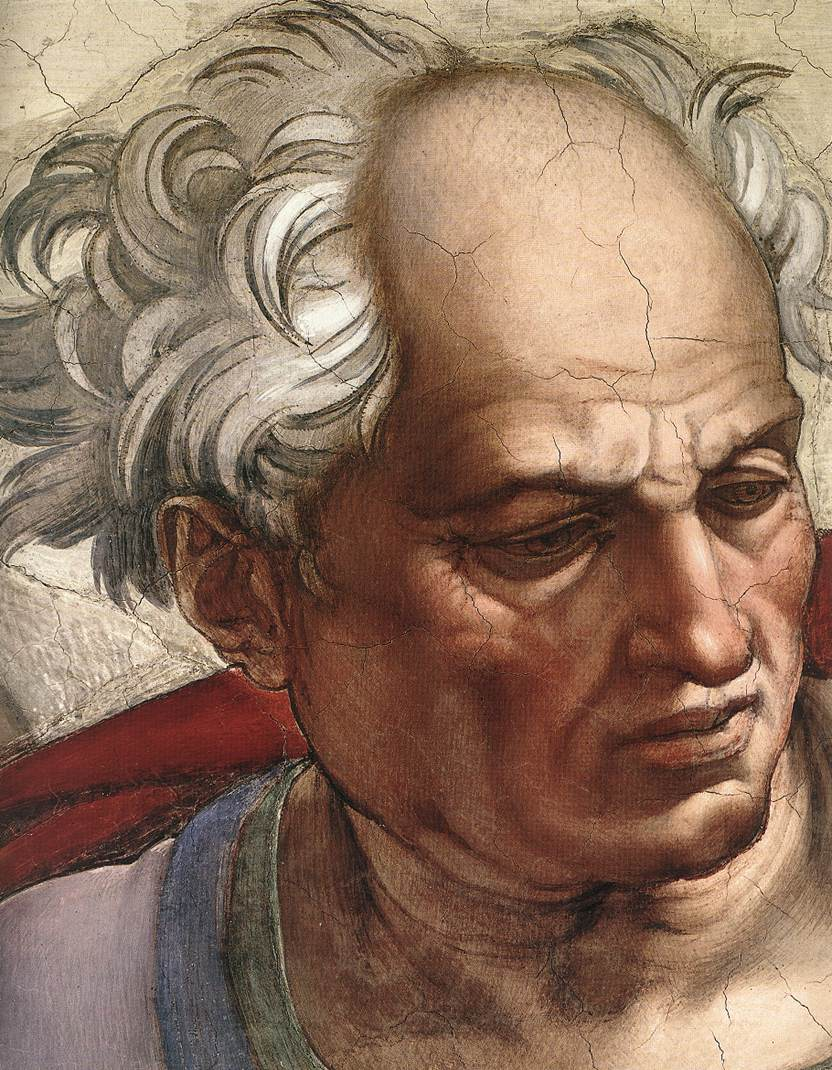
A close-up of the face of the central figure

== See also ==
- List of works by Michelangelo
- Sistine Chapel ceiling
- Prophet Jeremiah
