= Jose ben Jochanan =

Chief Justice of the Sanhedrin in the 2nd century

Jose ben Jochanan (Hebrew: יוסי בן יוחנן, Yose ben Yochanan or Joseph ben Johanan) was Av Beit Din (Chief Justice) of the Sanhedrin in the 2nd century BCE. He was a native of Jerusalem. He and Jose ben Joezer were the successors and, it is said, the disciples of Antigonus of Sokho, and the two together formed the first of a series of duumvirates that transmitted the traditional law; according to tradition, in each pair one was the Nasi (prince or president) and the other was the Av Beit Din (Chief Justice of the Sanhedrin).

One of Jose's sayings was: "Let thy house be opened wide; and let the needy be thy household; and prolong not converse with woman".

A disagreement between the two colleagues with regard to halakhic decisions gave rise to the formation of two different schools. Both men were opposed to Hellenism, and both belonged to the Hasideans. Jose ben Joezer and Jose ben Johanan were the last of the "eshkolot", or "wise men" (from Hebrew Eshkolot, "bunches [of grapes]", poet. "abounding in wisdom").

Unknown	Av Beth Din c.155 BCE	Succeeded by Nittai of Arbela

== Resources ==
- Schechter, Solomon and M. Seligsohn. "Jose (Joseph) ben Johanan". Jewish Encyclopedia. Funk and Wagnalls, 1901–1906; which cites the following bibliography:
- Frankel, Darke ha-Mishnah, pp. [pages] 29 et seq. [and following];

- Grätz, Gesch. 3rd ed. [edition], ii. 274, iii. 3;

- idem [same author], in Monatsschrift, xviii. 20 et seq.;

- Heilprin, Seder ha-Dorot, ii.;
- Schürer, Gesch. 3rd ed., ii. 202, 352, 357;
- Weiss, Dor, i. 103 et seq.
- https://www.youtube.com/watch?v=m8dnPohx444
