= Nithya =

Nithya may refer to

- Nithya Das, Indian film actress
- Nithya Mammen, Indian playback singer
- Nithya Menen (born 1988), Indian film actress
- Nithya Ram (born 1990), Indian television and film actress
- Nithya Raman, American urban planner and politician
- Nithya Ravindran, Indian film actress
- Nithya Shree, Malaysian actress and makeup artist
- Yeto Vellipoyindhi Manasu (working title Nithya), a 2012 Indian Telugu-language film

== See also ==
- Nitya (disambiguation), alternative form of the Indian female given name
- Nityananda (disambiguation)
