= Abtalion =

1st-century BCE Pharisee leader

Abtalion (Hebrew: אַבְטַלְיוֹן ʾAḇṭalyōn) or Avtalyon (Modern Hebrew) was a rabbinic sage in the early pre-Mishnaic era. He was a leader of the Pharisees during the 1st century BCE, and by tradition the vice-president of the great Sanhedrin of Jerusalem. He lived at the same time as Sh'maya. They are known as one of the zugot ("couples"): Shmaya and Avtalyon. Abtalion lived approximately from 90 BCE - 20 BCE.

== Biography ==
Abtalion and Shemaiah were converts to Judaism or the descendants of converts; by tradition they were descended from King Sennacherib of Assyria. Despite this, they were influential and beloved. The Talmud relates that once, when the high priest was being escorted home from the Temple by the people, at the close of a Day of Atonement, the crowd deserted him upon the approach of Abtalion and Shemaiah and followed them. However, Graetz has argued that neither Shemaiah nor Abtalion was of Gentile descent, although both were Alexandrians.

Little is known about Abtalion's life. He was a pupil of Judah ben Tabbai and Simeon ben Shetach, and probably lived for some time in Alexandria, Egypt, where he and also his teacher Judah took refuge when Alexander Jannaeus cruelly persecuted the Pharisees. This gives pertinence to his maxim, "You wise men, be careful of your words, lest you draw upon yourselves the punishment of exile and be banished to a place of bad water (dangerous doctrine), and your disciples, who come after you, drink thereof and die, and the name of the Holy One thereby be profaned." He cautions the rabbis herein against participation in politics (compare the maxim of his colleague) as well as against emigration to Egypt, where Greek ideas threatened Judaism.

Abtalion and Shemaiah are the first to bear the title darshan, and it was probably by no mere chance that their pupil Hillel was the first to lay down hermeneutic rules for the interpretation of the Midrash; he may have been indebted to his teachers for the tendency toward aggadic interpretation. These two scholars are the first whose sayings are recorded in the aggadah. The new method of derush (Biblical interpretation) introduced by Abtalion and Shemaiah seems to have evoked opposition among the Pharisees. Abtalion and Shemaiah are also the first whose halakhot (legal decisions) are handed down to later times. Among them is the important one that the paschal lamb must be offered even if Passover falls on a Sabbath. Abtalion's academy was not free to every one, but those who sought entrance paid daily a small admission fee of one and a half tropaïka; that is, about twelve cents. This was no doubt to prevent overcrowding by the people, or for some reasons stated by the Shammaites.

The traditional tombs of Shmaiah and Abtalion are located in Jish, a village in the Galilee.

== In Josephus ==
Josephus twice refers to a Pollion, who may be identical to Abtalion, along with a Sameas (Koine Greek: Σαμαίας) who may be identical to Shemaya. Linguistically, the original form of Pollion is presumably Ptollion, which explains both the prefixed A in the Talmud and the omission of the t in Josephus.

In the first source, Abtalion used his influence with the people in persuading the men of Jerusalem, in the year 37 BCE, to open the gates of their city to Herod the Great. Herod was not ungrateful, and rewarded Pollion and Pollion's student Sameas (Shemaiah) with great honors. In the second source, Herod exacted the oath of allegiance under penalty of death, and continues: "He desired also to compel Pollion, the Pharisee, and Sameas, together with the many who followed them, to take this oath; they, however, refused to do this, but nevertheless were not punished as were others who had refused to take it, and this indeed out of consideration for Pollion." This episode took place in the eighteenth year of Herod's reign (20 or 19 BCE).

Some modern scholars believe that both of these sources refer to Abtalyon and Shemaiah; others, that the first source refers to Avtalyon and Shemaya and the second source to Hillel (who became leader in 30 BCE according to the Talmud) and Shammai; still others, that both sources refer to Hillel and Shammai. According to the latter opinions, Josephus was misled by the similarity of the names Shemaiah and Shammai, and so wrote "Pollion and Sameas" instead of "Hillel and Shammai."

Preceded by Judah ben Tabbai	Av Beth Din	Succeeded by Menahem the Essene
