= Joel (prophet) =

Abrahamic prophet, author of the Book of Joel

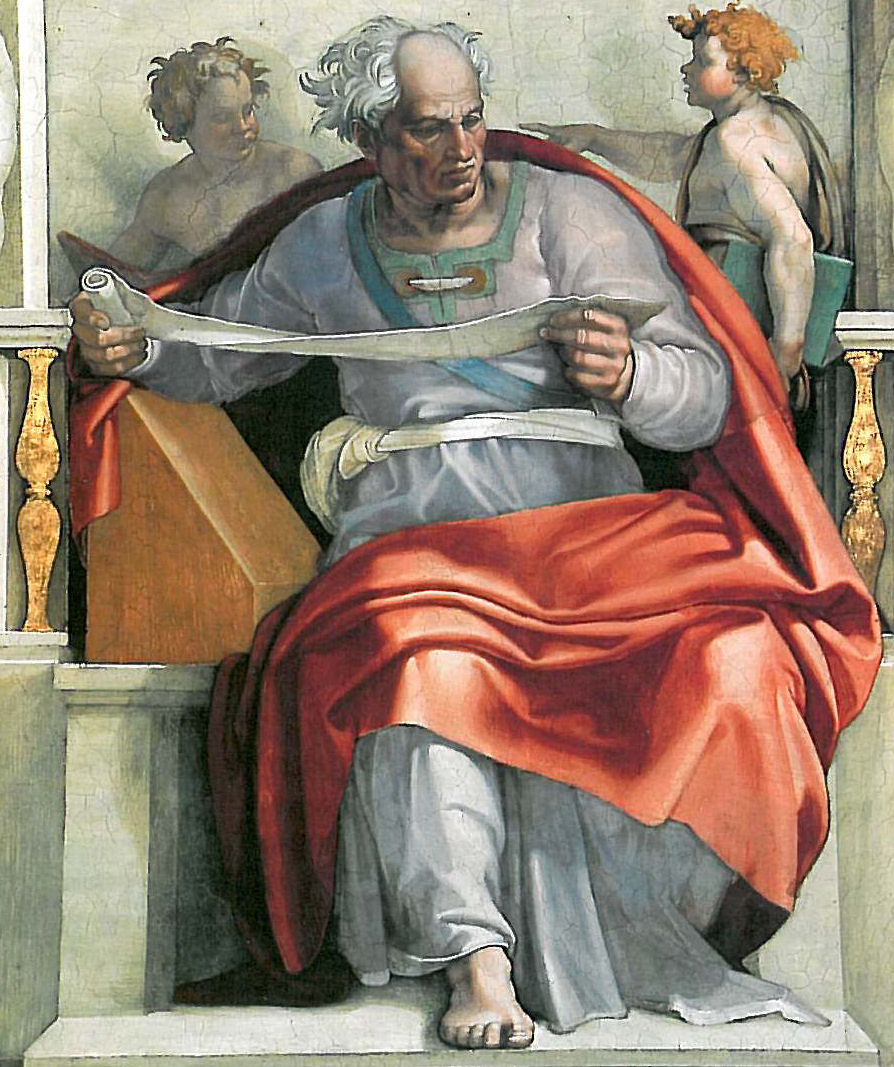
- Prophet Joel by Michelangelo, 1508–1512

Prophet
- Venerated in: Judaism; Christianity; Islam; Baháʼí Faith; Rastafari
- Major shrine: Gush Halav, Israel
- Feast: October 19 (Orthodox)
- Attributes: Prophet
- Major works: Book of Joel

Joel (Note: /ˈdʒoʊəl/; Hebrew: יוֹאֵל – Yōʾēl; Greek: Ἰωήλ – Iōḗl; Syriac: ܝܘܐܝܠ – Yu'il) is a Biblical prophet, the second of the Twelve Minor Prophets, and, according to itself, the author of the Book of Joel, which is set in the early Assyrian period. Scholars meanwhile view the Book of Joel as having been completed in the Ptolemaic period (c. 301-201 BC) due to its use of earlier texts and perspective on Yahweh and the nations.

== Name ==
Joel is mentioned by name only once in the Hebrew Bible, in the introduction to that book, as the son of Pethuel (Joel 1:1). The name combines the covenant name of God, YHWH (or Yahweh), and El (god), and has been translated as "YHWH is God" or "one to whom YHWH is God," that is, a worshiper of YHWH.

== Life ==
Some commentators suggest that Joel lived in the 9th century BC, whereas others assign him to the 5th or 4th century BC. The dating of his book is similarly debated; there are no mentions of kings that might help locate it in time. The book's mention of Greeks has not given scholars any help in dating the text since the Greeks were known to have had access to Judah from Mycenaean times (c. 1600–1100 BC). However, the book's mention of Judah's suffering and to the standing temple have led some scholars to place the date of the book in the post-exilic period, after the construction of the Second Temple. Joel was originally from Judah/Judea, and, judging from its prominence in his prophecy, was quite possibly a prophet associated with the ritual of either Solomon's or the Second temple, depending on the date when he lived.

According to a long-standing tradition, Joel was buried in Gush Halav. In the western outskirts of the modern village, there is a structure that has long been considered Joel's tomb, which contains several ancient rock-cut tombs.

== In Christianity ==
On the Eastern Orthodox liturgical calendar, his feast day is 19 October.

In the Roman Martyrology, the prophet is commemorated on 13 July.

He is commemorated with the other minor prophets in the Calendar of saints of the Armenian Apostolic Church on 31 July.

Joel's statement that "I will pour out my spirit upon all flesh; and your sons and your daughters shall prophesy, your old men shall dream dreams, your young men shall see visions" was applied by St Peter in his sermon at Pentecost to the events of that day.

According to the Eastern Orthodox Christian hymns, the ancient hymnographer Anatolius links Joel's prophecy to the birth of Christ. In Joel 2:30, he says that the blood refers to the incarnation of Jesus Christ, the fire to the Divinity of Christ, and the pillars of smoke to the Holy Spirit.

== In the Baháʼí Faith ==
Joel is considered a minor prophet in the Baháʼí Faith. In the Kitab-i-Iqan, Baha'ullah states that previous prophecies by minor prophets such as Joel have symbolic meanings and significance and therefore should not be understood literally.

== In Islam ==
In Islam, Yu'il ibn Fatu'il (Arabic: يُئيل بن فَتُئيل) isn't mentioned in the Quran nor the Hadith.

The Qur’an, however, states:

“And We certainly sent messengers before you. Among them are those We have related to you, and among them are those We have not related to you.” (Qur’an 40:78)

It's possible that Yu'il (Joel) was a prophet sent by God to guide Bani-Israel.
