= Judah ben Tabbai =

Pharisee scholar, Chief Justice of the Sanhedrin

Judah ben Tabbai (Hebrew: יהודה בן טבאי Yehuda ben Tabbai) was a Pharisee scholar, av beit din of the Sanhedrin, and one of "the Pairs" (zugot) of Jewish leaders who lived in the first century BCE. He lived approximately from 120 BCE to 50 BCE.

== Av beit din of the Sanhedrin ==
To escape Alexander Jannaeus's persecution of the Pharisees, Judah ben Tabbai, who was already a prominent Pharisee scholar, fled to Alexandria. After Jannaeus's death in 76 BCE, Salome Alexandra became queen of Judea. The Pharisees now became not only a tolerated section of the community, but actually the ruling class. Salome Alexandra installed as high priest her eldest son, Hyrcanus II, a man who was wholly supportive of the Pharisees and the Sanhedrin was reorganized according to their wishes.

As part of the reorganization, Salome appointed her brother Simeon ben Shetach as prince (nasi) of the Sanhedrin. Simeon ben Shetach wrote a flattering letter to Judah ben Tabbai, who was still in Alexandria, inviting him to return to Jerusalem to become the Av beit din of the Sanhedrin.

With the help of Simon [Judah] undertook the reorganization of the [Sanhedrin], the improvement of the administration of the law, the re-establishment of neglected religious observances, the furthering of education, and generally the fashioning of such regulations as the times required. Like Ezra and Nehemiah of old, these two zealous men insisted upon a return to the strictest form of Judaism; and, if they were often obliged to employ severe and violent measures, these are not to be accounted to any personal malice, but to the sterness of the age itself. They were indeed scrupulously strict in their own conduct, and in directing those closely connected with them. From the days of Judah ben Tabbai and Simon ben Shetach, the rule of Judean Law, according to the view of the Pharisees, may be said to have begun, and it grew and developed under each succeeding generation. These two celebrated men have therefore been called "Restorers of the Law", who "brought back the Crown (the Law) its ancient splendor."

— Heinrich Graetz in History of the Jews

== Opposition to the Sadducees ==
According to the Torah, if a witness testifies falsely in court against a defendant, the punishment for the false witness is the same as the punishment would have been for the defendant had he been convicted (Deuteronomy 19:16–21). According to the Talmud, the Sadducees held that the false witness is punished only if the defendant has already been punished. However, according to the Pharisees, the false witness could be punished even if the defendant was never punished.

Because Judah ben Tabbai opposed the Sadducees, in a particular capital case in which a false witness testified, he ordered that the false witness be executed even though the defendant was not punished. According to the Talmud, this was wrong, since, under Pharisaic rules, a false witness could only be punished if there were two or more false witnesses, and in this particular case, only one of the witnesses was deemed to be a false witness. Upon realizing this error, Judah spent time at the grave of the false witness that he ordered to be executed, crying and seeking forgiveness.

== Association with Karaite Judaism ==
According to medieval Karaite scholars, such as Moses ben Elijah Bashyazi, and Solomon Jedidiah ben Aaron, Judah ben Tabbai was the founder of Karaite Judaism. The claim argues a narrative that because Alexander Jannaeus persecuted the Pharisees, and later Salome Alexandra expelled the Sadducees, once Simeon ben Shetach began restoring the Sanhedrin, there was little check on his power. Thus, as part of Simeon's reorganization of the Sanhedrin, he introduced new laws that were hitherto unknown, but which he claimed originated with Moses. These new laws then came to be known as the Oral Torah. Judah ben Tabbai, on the other hand, continued to apply only the Written Torah, the written law which was known since ancient times. Thus, Simeon and his followers became the founders of Rabbinic Judaism, which is Judaism based on the Written Torah and the new oral laws, whereas Judah and his followers, and all the Pharisees who continued to follow only the Written Torah, became the founders of Karaite Judaism. This split is said to have occurred in approximately 57 BCE.

However, the Karaites themselves follow their own version of an oral tradition, called Sevel HaYerusah. It is further recognized that the ambiguities in the Written Torah did not prevent Moses and the jews from fulfilling it with certain specifications, making the existence of oral traditions axiomatic. The Karaite disagreements are inherently historical – for example, the Karaites maintain that sexual intercourse is "work" prohibited on the sabbath, while the Rabbis disagree. More than an interpretative question, at the time of the disagreement one can see what had been historically done.

Moreover, the official Pharisaic history written in 200 CE lists Judah Ben Tabai as a generational link in the chain of their oral teachings from Moses. Rabbinic historians have never considered this Karaite claim worth responding to.

== Students ==
Among Simeon Ben Shetach Judah ben Tabbai's students were the next Pharisee zugot, Shmaya and Abtalion.

== Sayings ==
In Pirkei Avot, Judah ben Tabbai is quoted as saying:

Do not act as an advisor among judges.

When the litigants are before you, see them as criminals.

And when the litigants have taken their leave, see them as innocent, should they have accepted the decision.

— Pirkei Avot 1:8

Preceded by Nittai of Arbela	Av Beth Din	Succeeded by Abtalion
