= Kavre Nitya Chandeswori =

Kavre Nitya Chandeswori काभ्रे नित्य चण्डेश्वरी
- Village development committee
- Nickname: काभ्रे (Kavre)
- Motto: Be the change you want to see in the world.
- Location in Nepal
- Coordinates: 27.61°N 85.59°E
- Country: Nepal
- Zone: Bagmati Zone
- District: Kavrepalanchok District
- Municipality: Dhulikhel Municipality

Population (2011)
  - Total: 4,927
- Time zone: UTC+5:45 (Nepal Time)

Kavre Nitya Chandeswori popularly known as "Kavre" is a village development committee in Kavrepalanchok District in the Bagmati Zone of central Nepal. Two of its V.D.C's are included in Dhulikhel Municipality in the year 2015 A.D. At the time of the 2011 Nepal census it had a population of 4,927 in 1,042 individual households.

This village is located 34.9 km east along the Araniko Highway from Kathmandu and 8 km east along the B.P. Koirala Highway from Dhulikhel. Travel time from Kathmandu to Kavre takes approximately 1 hour and 20 minutes, excluding road traffic. The B.P. Koirala Highway passes through the center of the village. Views of the Himalayas are visible from this location. The primary occupations are agriculture and cattle farming. Residents sell vegetables, dairy products, and livestock to nearby areas such as Dhulikhel, Banepa, and Kathmandu. Additionally, many residents are government officials. Because the village is near the district headquarters of Dhulikhel, development is taking place. Infrastructure has been established, and living standards are increasing. The literacy rate is 72.35%. The village contains a government school, Shree Karthari Secondary School, established in 2009 B.S.

== Media ==
To Promote local culture, Kavre district has one Television Broadcast Channel "Araniko T.V" and three local FM radio stations, Radio Namobuddha - 106.7 MHz, Radio ABC - 89.8 MHz which is a Community Radio Station and Prime Fm - 104.5 MHz. This place also has good access of most of the radio stations from Kathmandu and other parts of Nepal.

Kavre(common name for Kavre Nitya CHandeshwor) has a local channel distributor company which is currently providing service to around 100 subscribers from 9 V.D.C's. Kavre is served by major mobile network operators, including NTC and Ncell, with widespread cellular device penetration among the local population.
