= Mount Nitai =

Mountain in Israel

- Har Nitai
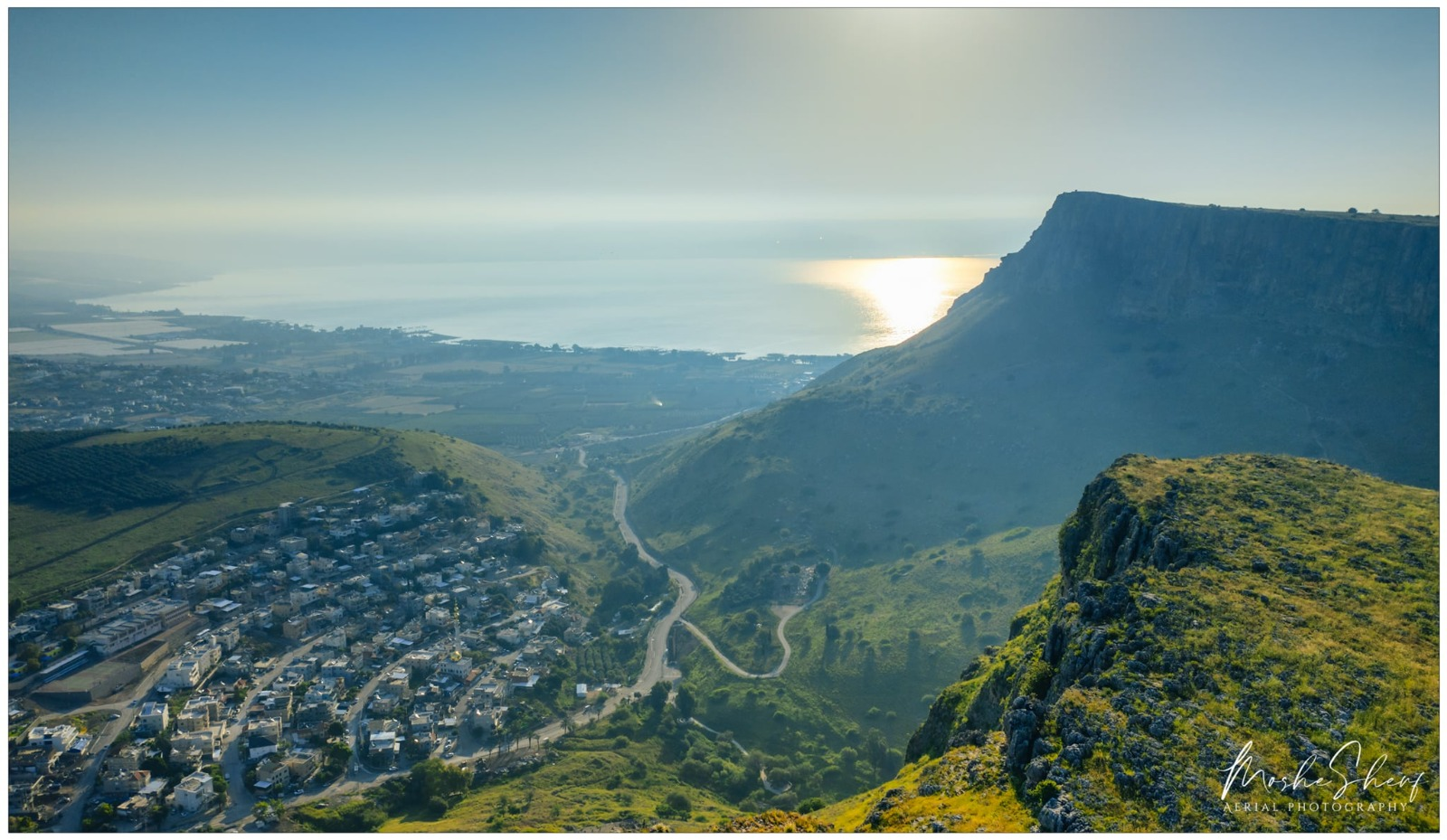

Highest point
- Coordinates: 32°49′32.22″N 35°29′12.04″E

Geography
- Location within Israel
- Location: Israel

Mount Nitai (Hebrew: הר נתאי, Har Nitai), sometimes spelled Nitay, is a mountain in Israel situated west of the Sea of Galilee and north of the city of Tiberias. Har Nitai is named after Nittai of Arbela. The cliffs of Nitai and Arbel are visible when looking southwest from Capernaum on the shore of the Sea of Galillee.

== History ==
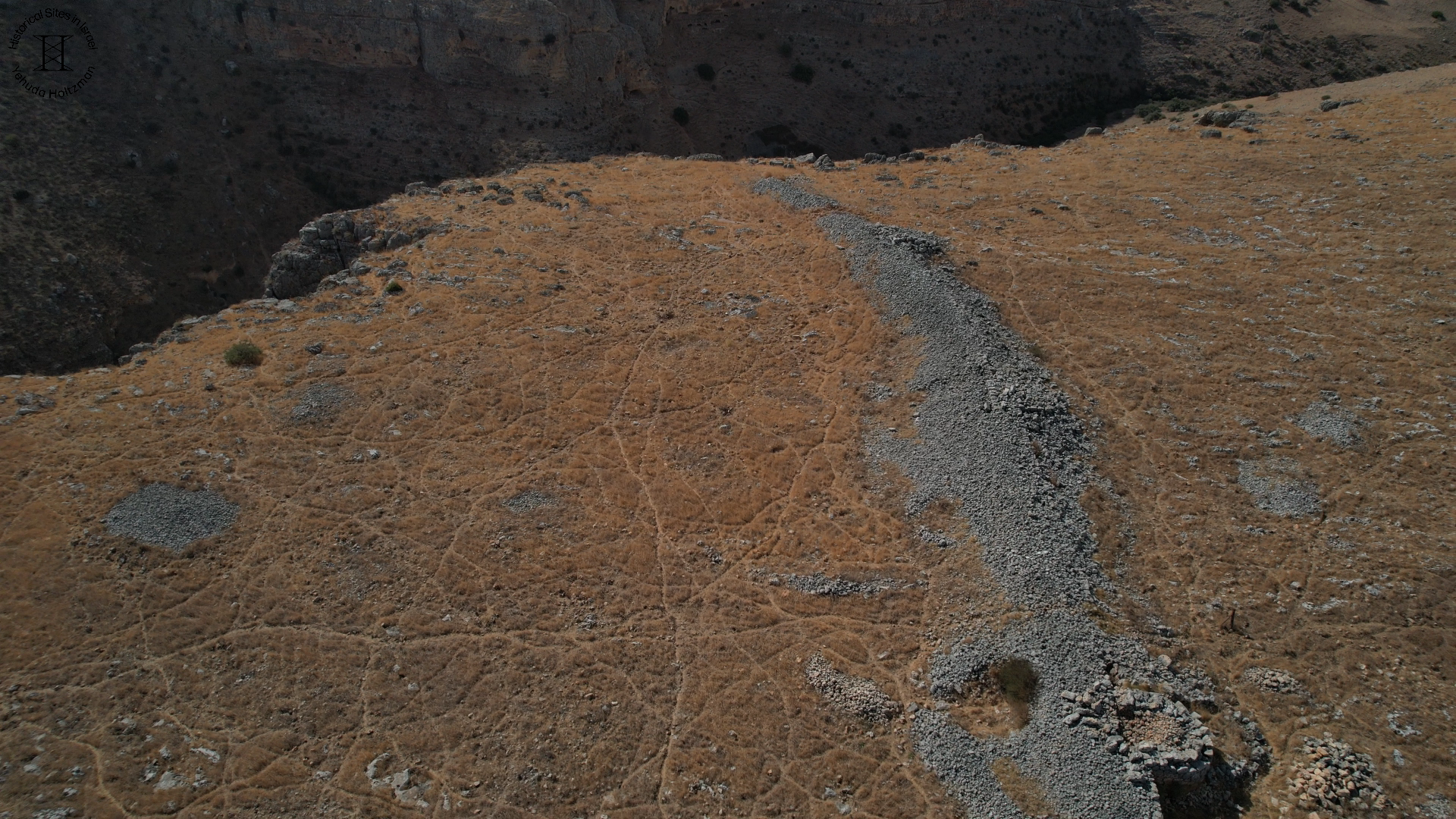
The wall on Mount Nitai

A valley with a stream through it separates Mount Nitai (Har Nitai) from Mount Arbel(Har Arbel). The valley is called today in Hebrew 'Arbel' and in Arabic 'Wadi Hamam' ("Valley of the Doves").

On the eastern slope of Mount Nitai, down next to the stream, is an archaeological site, Khirbet Wadi Hamam (Hurvat Vradim is the modern Hebrew name), where an ancient Jewish synagogue has been excavated. The site is identified by some as the ancient Jewish town of Arbel, which moved onto the opposite side of the valley, on the northern side of Mount Arbel, only in the Middle Ages.

Atop Har Nitai is a grove of trees and the ruins of an ancient settlement, identified as the ancient village of Arbel The eastern boundary of the site is marked by the ruins of an ancient wall, and approximately 80 metres east of the wall is a sheer drop-off, or cliff.

In 2018, Severino Caruso, a young French man accompanying groups of pilgrims in Israel, identified Mount Nittai of Arbela as the plausible place where Christ spent a week in retreat with his apostles, far from the tumult of the world, in order to introduce them to specific teaching with a view to their future mission in the Church. His research is based on the descriptions of a Mystic work entitled: “The Gospel as it was revealed to me” by Maria Valtorta, a Catholic mystic, who, through vision and supernatural immersion, would have witnessed all the biblical events in the public life of Jesus of Nazareth, from 1943 to 1947. The descriptions of the work allowed the engineer and researcher Jean-François Lavère to authenticate many of the original places that saw Jesus pass during his public life. Severino Caruso then perceived the historical significance of this discovery, which he made in the Arbel Valley, which confirms that the visions of Maria Valtorta seem to be authentic. He published a testimonial french book on the subject in 2021 entitled: “The Arbel Valley and the election of the twelve apostles” Centro Valtortiano edition.
