= Shmaya (tanna) =

Rabbinic sage

Shemaiah (Hebrew: שְׁמַעְיָה, Šəmaʿyā; Koine Greek: Σαμαίᾱς, Samaíās), or Shmaya (in Modern Hebrew), was a rabbinic sage in the early pre-Mishnaic era who lived at the same time as Abtalion. They are known as one of the zugot ("couples"): Shemaiah and Abtalion; Shemaiah holding the title of nasi, whilst Abtalion holding the office of Av Beit Din.

== Biography ==
Abtalion and Shemaiah were converts to Judaism or the descendants of converts; by tradition they were descended from King Sennacherib of the Neo-Assyrian Empire. Despite this, they were influential and beloved. The Talmud relates that once, when the high priest was being escorted home from the Temple by the people, at the close of a Day of Atonement, the crowd deserted him upon the approach of Abtalion and Shemaiah and followed them. However, Graetz has argued that neither Shemaiah nor Abtalion was of Gentile descent, although both were Alexandrians.

According to the Mishnah, both Shemaiah and Abtalion studied Torah under Simeon ben Shetach.

He was a leader of the Pharisees in the 1st century BCE and president of the Sanhedrin before the reign of Herod the Great. He and his colleague Abtalion are termed the gedolei ha-dor (the great men of the age) and darshanim (exegetes). Hillel the Elder was a contemporary of Shemaiah and Abtalion, and regularly attended their lectures.

Of the political life of Shemaiah, only one incident is reported. When Herod on his own responsibility had put to death the leader of the national party in Galilee, Hyrcanus II, he permitted the Sanhedrin to cite him before the tribunal. Herod appeared, but in royal purple robes, whereupon the members of the Sanhedrin lost courage. Only Shemaiah was brave enough to say: "He who is summoned here on a capital charge appears like one who would order us to execution straightway if we should pronounce him guilty. Yet I can blame him less than you and the king, since ye permit such a travesty of justice. Know then that he before whom ye now tremble will some day deliver you to the executioner." This tradition is found twice, in Josephus and the Talmud.

The tombs of Shemaiah and Abtalyon are located in Jish, a Maronite Christian village in the Galilee.

== In Josephus ==
Shemaiah and Abtalion may be identical to Sameas and Pollion who are mentioned by Josephus. Shemaiah is named by Josephus under his Greek name Sameas (Greek: Σαμαίας). According to Josephus, he led the Sanhedrin during the transition period between the Hasmonean dynasty and the rise of King Herod the Great. Shemaiah is described by Josephus as a disciple of Pollion the Pharisee, who, in rabbinic literature, is known as Abtalion. Herod held both Abtalion and Shemaiah in great honour.

== Quotes ==
- Love work. Hate [having to assume] authority. Do not make yourself known to the government.

Preceded by Simeon ben Shetach	Nasi; 60 BCE – c. 30 BCE	Succeeded by Hillel the Elder
