= Nitya Seva =

Nitya Seva is an association based in Bensheim which aims to give help to the disadvantaged sections of the society for their social-financial upliftment and in the areas of health awareness, cultural exchange and support during crises. It was formed by Claus D. von der Fink on 13 June 1998 in Germany.

== Nitya Seva Society ==
In November 1999, Claus D. and Asha von der Fink established Nitya Seva Society at Bhopal (India). The society runs projects for the needy street, slum and platform children. These children, many of them with no relatives, are between the ages of 3 and 18 years.

The Society at present is running four homes in Bhopal (children's home in Bhopal - Chandbarh since 2000, children's home in Bhopal - Pipalner since 2004, After Care Center since 2014 and Girls Hostel since December 2020) with on the whole 200 boys and girls and provides

- a comfortable sleeping place
- facilities for washing and bathing
- regular medical support
- proper clothes
- nourishing warm meals
- facilities for school education and vocational training
- opportunities for a meaningful life within the group and participation in civic activities, and to develop an open mind and a respect for different cultures and religions.

Claus D. von der Fink has been honored in 2004 with the Bundesverdienstkreuz / Federal Cross of Merit of the Federal Republic of Germany and in 2015 with the Bergsträßer Bürgerpreis (lifetime achievement award) for his social commitment in India.
