= Nittai of Arbela =

Jewish rabbi, vice president of the Sanhedrin

Nittai of Arbela (Hebrew: נתאי הארבלי) was av beit din or vice-president of the Sanhedrin under the nasi Joshua ben Perachyah at the time of John Hyrcanus (r. 134–104 BC).

== Name ==
In Yer. Hag. II 76d he is called Mattai of Arbela, which is also found in ancient and linguistically reliable manuscripts of the Mishnah, such as Codex Kaufmann, Codex Parma A and the Cambridge Codex (edited by W. H. Lowe). The confusion in the rendering of his name seems to be due to faulty textual transmission, i.e. the Hebrew mem being separated graphically into two parts, which looked, respectively as a nun and a yod, thus Mattai became Nittai. Arbela was a city of the Galilee not far from Tiberias.

== Teachings ==
No halakhot of his are extant, but some of his apothegms have been preserved in such sources as Pirkei Avot; these afford a glimpse of his character, to wit: "Distance thyself from a bad neighbor; consort not with an evil man, nor despair at tribulation." These bitter utterances contrast sharply with the gentle maxims of his colleague Joshua ben Perachyah. Nittai seems to have spoken thus after John Hyrcanus had deserted the party of the Pharisees and joined the Sadducees, persecuting his former friends. The phrase "renounce not the hope of retribution" was perhaps intended to comfort the Pharisees with the thought that Hyrcanus himself would not escape punishment, while the other two injunctions were designed maybe to keep them from joining the Sadducees.

Preceded by Jose ben Jochanan	Av Beth Din	Succeeded by Judah ben Tabbai

== See also ==
- Mount Nitai

== Bibliography ==
=== Jewish Encyclopedia bibliography ===
- Weiss, Dor, i. 132;
- Z. Frankel, in Monatsschrift, 1852, pp. 410–413;
- id., Hodegetica in Mischnam, pp. 33–34, Leipzig, 1859.
