= Nitya Anand =

Indian medicinal chemist (1925–2024)

Nitya Anand (1 January 1925 – 27 January 2024) was an Indian medicinal chemist who was the director of Central Drug Research Institute in Lucknow from 1974 to 1984. In 2005, Indian Pharmacopoeia Commission (IPC) appointed him chairman of its scientific committee. In 2012, he was awarded the Padma Shri by the Indian government.

== Early life and education ==
Nitya Anand was born in Lyallpur, Punjab Province, British India on 1 January 1925. He earned his Bachelor's of Science degree from the Government College University Lahore in 1943 and his Master's degree in chemistry from St. Stephen's College in 1945. In 1948, Anand was awarded a Ph.D. in organic chemistry from the Institute of Chemical Technology in Mumbai. He received his second Ph.D. from St. John's College at Cambridge University. He was a post-doctoral researcher at Harvard Medical School in 1958.

== Career ==
Anand joined Central Drug Research Institute in Lucknow in Medicinal Chemistry Division in 1951 and later became director of the Institute. Anand was chairman of Ranbaxy Science Foundation (RSF). His overall research interest has always been in the design, discovery and development of new drugs using synthetic chemistry approaches. This mainly involved consideration of factors such as drug-receptor interaction and metabolism in drug design. He published over 400 research articles and held over 130 patents. He was joint author with Jasjit S. Bindra Ph.D. of the book "Art in Organic Synthesis" which was published in 1969. Anand was also a Fellow of the Indian National Science Academy.

== Death ==
Anand died on 27 January 2024, at the age of 99.
