= Simeon ben Shetach =

Jewish Pharisee scholar (c. 140–60 BCE)

- Reign: 100 BCE – 60 BCE
- Born: c. 140 BCE
- Burial: c. 60 BCE
- Religion: Judaism
- Occupation: Nasi, Sage, rabbi, scholar

Simeon ben Shetach, or Shimon ben Shetach or Shatach (Hebrew: שמעון בן שטח), circa 140–60 BCE, was a Pharisee scholar and Nasi of the Sanhedrin during the reigns of Alexander Jannæus (c. 103–76 BCE) and his successor, Queen Salome Alexandra (c. 76–67 BCE), who was Simeon's sister. He was therefore closely connected with the court, enjoying, at least initially, the favor of Alexander. Simeon lived approximately from 140 BCE – 60 BCE.

Although a rabbi by profession, the omission of such an epithet when referred to in rabbinic literature is said to attest to his greatness as a rabbinic Sage, ranking with Hillel.

The Shimon ben Shatah Street in the center of Jerusalem carries his name.

== Under Alexander Jannaeus ==
During the reign of Alexander the Sanhedrin consisted almost entirely of Sadducees; nevertheless Simeon succeeded in ousting some of the Sadducean members and in replacing them with Pharisees. Having accomplished this, Simeon recalled from Alexandria, Egypt the Pharisees who had been compelled to seek refuge there during the reign of Alexander Jannæus, among these fugitives being Joshua ben Perachya, the former Nasi. Joshua was elected president anew, and Simeon assumed the office of vice-president. Upon the death of Joshua, Simeon became president and Judah ben Tabbai vice-president. The attitude of Alexander Jannæus toward the Pharisees, however, soon underwent a change; and they were again compelled to flee, even Simeon himself being obliged to go into hiding. About this time certain Parthian envoys came to Alexander's court and were invited to the king's table, where they noticed the absence of Simeon, by whose wisdom they had profited at previous visits. Upon the king's assurance that he would do the fugitive no harm, the queen caused her brother to return to the court. Upon his reappearance Simeon took his place between the royal couple with a show of self-consciousness which surprised the king; whereupon Simeon remarked, "The wisdom which I serve grants me equal rank with kings."

During Simeon ben Shetach's tenure as head of the Sanhedrin, the court ceased to exact fines in monetary suits (Hebrew: dinei mamonot) as prescribed in the Law of Moses. It was also during his tenure that he enacted the rule of conduct that an [Israelite] king is not to judge, neither are men to judge him, because of an incident that occurred with one of King Janneus' servants who had committed murder.

== Activity under Alexandra ==
After Simeon returned, he enjoyed the king's favor (in large part due to the queen). Upon the king's death, Queen Alexandra succeeded to the rulership; and Simeon and his party, the Pharisees, obtained great influence. Together with his colleague, Judah ben Tabbai, Simeon began to supersede the Sadducean teachings and to re-establish the authority of the Pharisaic interpretation of the Torah. He is therefore called "the restorer of the Law," who "has given back to the crown of learning its former brightness". Simeon discarded the penal code which the Sadducees had introduced as a supplement to the biblical code; and almost all the teachings and principles introduced by him are aimed against the Sadducean interpretation of the Law. Of Simeon's enactments two were of especial importance. One consisted in the restriction of divorces, which were then of frequent occurrence. Simeon arranged that the husband might use the prescribed marriage gift ("ketubah") in his business, but that his entire fortune should be held liable for it. Inasmuch as a husband of small means could ill afford to withdraw a sum of money from his business, Simeon's ruling tended to check hasty divorces. The other important act referred to the instruction of the young.

== Founded popular schools ==
Up to Simeon's time there were no schools in Judea, and the instruction of children was, according to biblical precepts, left to their fathers. Simeon ordered that yeshivot be established in the larger cities in which the young might receive instruction in the Holy Scriptures as well as in the traditional knowledge of the Law.

== Witch-hunt and his son's death ==
In a significant case of an early witch hunt, on a single day Simeon ben Shetach's court sentenced to death eighty women in Ashkelon who had been charged with sorcery. The relatives of these women, filled with a desire for revenge, brought false witnesses against Simeon's son, whom they accused of a crime which involved capital punishment; and as a result of this charge he was sentenced to death. While on the way to the place of execution, the witnesses recanted their testimony. Simeon ben Shetach sought to have the case reopened. Simeon's son protested that, according to the Law, a witness must not be believed when he withdraws a former statement, and he said to his father, "If you seek to bring about salvation, then consider me as a threshold [towards that goal]." The execution then proceeded. This event may have been the reason why Simeon issued a warning that witnesses should always be carefully cross-questioned.

== Fairness ==
Simeon's fairness toward gentiles is illustrated by the following narrative: Simeon lived in humble circumstances, supporting himself and his family by conducting a small business in linen goods. Once his pupils presented him with a donkey which they had purchased from a gentile merchant. Using the legal formula prescribed by the Talmud, they said "When we pay you, this donkey and everything on it is ours." After receiving the gift, Simeon removed the saddle and discovered a costly jewel. The students joyously told their master that he might now cease toiling since the proceeds from the jewel would make him wealthy - the legal formula of the sale meant that the jewel was now his property. Simeon, however, replied that even though the letter of the law said they were right, it was clear that the seller had no intention of selling the jewel along with the animal. Simeon returned the gem to the merchant, who exclaimed, "Praised be the God of Simeon ben Shetach!"

== Quotes ==
Be diligent when inquiring of the witnesses, and be careful of your words, lest thereby they learn to lie.

== Bibliography ==
- Landau, in Monatsschrift, 1853, pp. 107–122, 177–180;
- Weiss, Dor, i.134 et seq.;
- Heilprin, Seder ha-Dorot, ii.360;
- Grätz, Gesch. iii, Index

Preceded by Joshua ben Perachyah	Nasi; 100 BCE - 60 BCE	Succeeded by Shmaya
