= Ananus (disambiguation) =

Ananus is a historical Jewish high priest

Ananus may also refer to:

== People ==
- Ananus ben Ananus, Herodian-era high priest of Israel
- Theophilus ben Ananus, high priest in the Second Temple in Jerusalem

== Other uses ==
- Ananus, a synonym for Holothuria, a genus of sea cucumbers
