= Theophilus (biblical) =

Biblical character

Theophilus (Greek: Θεόφιλος) is the name or honorific title of the person to whom the Gospel of Luke and the Acts of the Apostles are addressed (Luke 1:3, Acts 1:1). It is thought that both works are by the same author, and often argued that the two were originally a single unified work. Both were written in a refined Koine Greek, and the name Θεόφιλος (Theophilos), as it appears therein, means friend of God, (be)loved by God, or loving God in Greek. Theophilus's identity is unknown, with several conjectures and traditions around an identity. In English, Theophilus is also written "Theophilos", both a common name and an honorary title among the learned (academic) Romans and Jews of the era. Theophilus' life coincided with the writing of Luke and the author of the Acts.

== Identity ==
=== Coptic view ===
Coptic tradition asserts that Theophilus was a person and not an honorary title. The Coptic Church claims that the person was a Jew of Alexandria. Similarly, John Wesley in his Notes on the New Testament recorded that Theophilus was "a person of eminent quality at Alexandria", based on what he understood to be the tradition 'of the ancients'.

=== Roman official ===
Luke addresses Theophilus as "Most excellent" (Greek: κράτιστε kratiste, Latin: optime), a form also used in Acts to address Roman governors. Some biblical interpreters have concluded that he was a Roman official who had been initiated into the church's teachings, for whom Luke now provided a full narrative. However, since it is not certain whether the κράτιστε was meant as a technically correct form of address for a Roman nobleman or merely as a general honouring statement about Theophilus, it is not possible to prove that he belonged to the upper class.

=== Honorary title ===
One tradition maintains that Theophilus was not a person. The word in Greek means "Friend of God" and thus both Luke and Acts were addressed to anyone who fits that description. In this tradition the author's targeted audience, as with all other canonical Gospels, were the learned (academic) but unnamed men and women of the era. Likewise the non-canonical Gospel of Thomas, Gospel of Peter, and Gospel of James are not addressed to any particular gender, or any specific person.

=== Paul's lawyer ===
Some theologians (e.g., David Pawson) believe that Theophilus could have been Paul's lawyer during his trial period in Rome. People who support this claim appeal to the formal legalese present in the prologue to the Gospel such as "eye witnesses," "account," "carefully investigated," "know the certainty of things which you have been instructed." The conclusion of the Book of Acts ends with Paul still alive and under arrest awaiting trial, suggesting it was the intention of the author to update Theophilus on Paul's history to provide for an explanation of his travels and preaching and serve as evidence in support of his innocence under Roman law. Some also point to the parallel between the account of Jesus' trial before Pontius Pilate narrated in Luke's Gospel with the account of Paul's trials before Roman judges in the Book of Acts. In total, Jesus was declared innocent three times by Pontius Pilate as was Paul before various judges.

=== Jewish priest ===
Some scholars point to Theophilus ben Ananus, High Priest from 37 to 41. In this tradition Theophilus would have been both a kohen and a Sadducee. That would make him the son of Annas and brother-in-law of Caiaphas, raised in the Second Temple period. Adherents claim that Luke's Gospel was targeted at Sadducee readers. This might explain some features of Luke's text. He begins the story with an account of Zacharias the righteous priest who had a Temple vision of an angel (1:5–25). Luke quickly moves to account Mary's purification (niddah), Jesus' Temple redemption (pidyon ha-ben) rituals (2:21–39), and then to Jesus' pilgrimage to the Temple when he was twelve (2:46). Some have suggested that this implied Jesus' bar mitzvah, though the modern method of celebrating bar mitzvah did not exist in that period and is not mentioned in sources until the Middle Ages. Luke makes no mention of Caiaphas' role in Jesus' crucifixion and emphasizes Jesus' literal resurrection (24:39), including an ascension into heaven as a realm of spiritual existence (24:52; Acts 1:1). Luke also seems to stress Jesus' arguments with the Sadducees on points like legal grounds for divorce, the existence of angels, spirits, and an afterlife (Sadducees did not believe in the resurrection of the dead). If this was the case then Luke is trying to use Jesus' rebuttals and teachings to break down Theophilus' Sadducean philosophy, maybe with the hope that Theophilus would use his influence to persuade the Sadducees to cease their persecution of the Christians. Some have suggested that Luke's Gospel could be seen as an allegorical (רֶמֶז remez) reference to Jesus as "the man called the Branch" prophesied in Zechariah 3:8; 6:12–13, who is the ultimate high priest foreshadowed by the Levitical priesthood.

All of the New Testament passages concerning alms and almsgiving, except one in Matthew, are in Luke–Acts. Therefore, these parables may be about alms, almsgiving and the proper use of the wealth controlled by the temple authorities. Luke's criticism focuses on the use of these temple resources by the religious aristocracy for their own selfish purposes. This means that the religious authorities controlled tremendous wealth that had been in times past properly distributed to the people as part of the institutional form of almsgiving. The priests in these parables are unfaithful, dishonest and disobedient because, inter alia, they have not invited the poor, the maimed, the lame and the blind to the banquet table. Once the office of the High Priest became non-hereditary, and available to the highest bidder, the institutional role of almsgiving was abandoned or reduced as the purchaser had to recoup his purchase price.

=== Other ===
A minority view identifies Theophilus as the high priest Mattathias ben Theophilus, who served from 65 to 66. Note that Luke refers to high priest Joseph ben Caiaphas simply as "Caiaphas". Thus, the reasoning goes, Luke used this pattern when addressing Theophilus.
