= Scourge =

Type of whip or lash

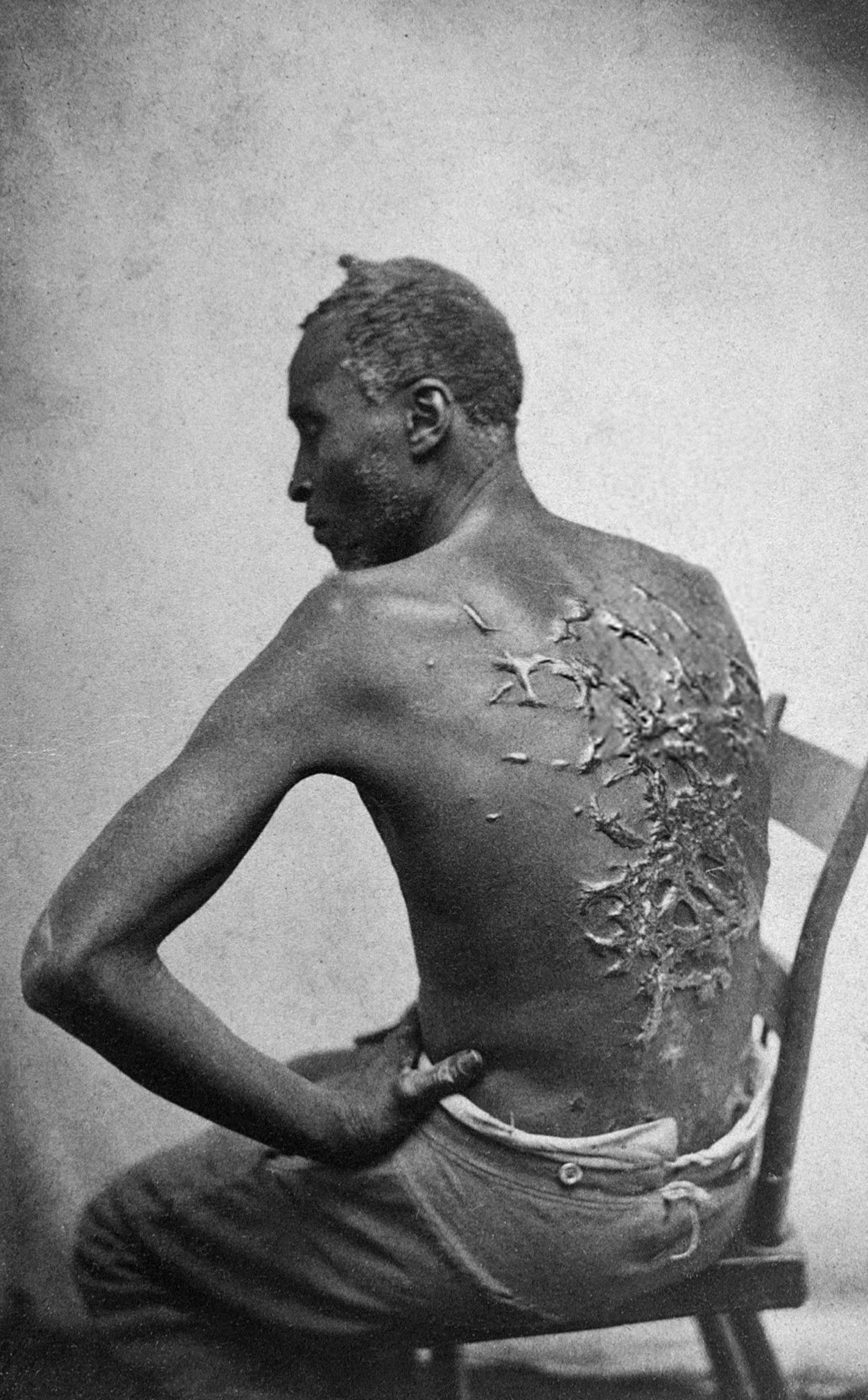
Medical examination photo of Gordon showing his scourged back, widely distributed by Abolitionists to expose the brutality of slavery.

A scourge is a whip or lash, especially a multi-thong type, used to inflict severe corporal punishment or self-mortification. It is usually made of leather.

== Etymology ==
The word is most commonly considered to be derived from Old French escorgier - "to whip", going further back to the Vulgar Latin excorrigiare: the Latin prefix ex- "out, off" with its additional English meaning of "thoroughly", plus corrigia - "thong", or in this case "whip". Some connect it to Latin: excoriare, "to flay", built of two Latin parts, ex- ("off") and corium, "skin".

== Description ==
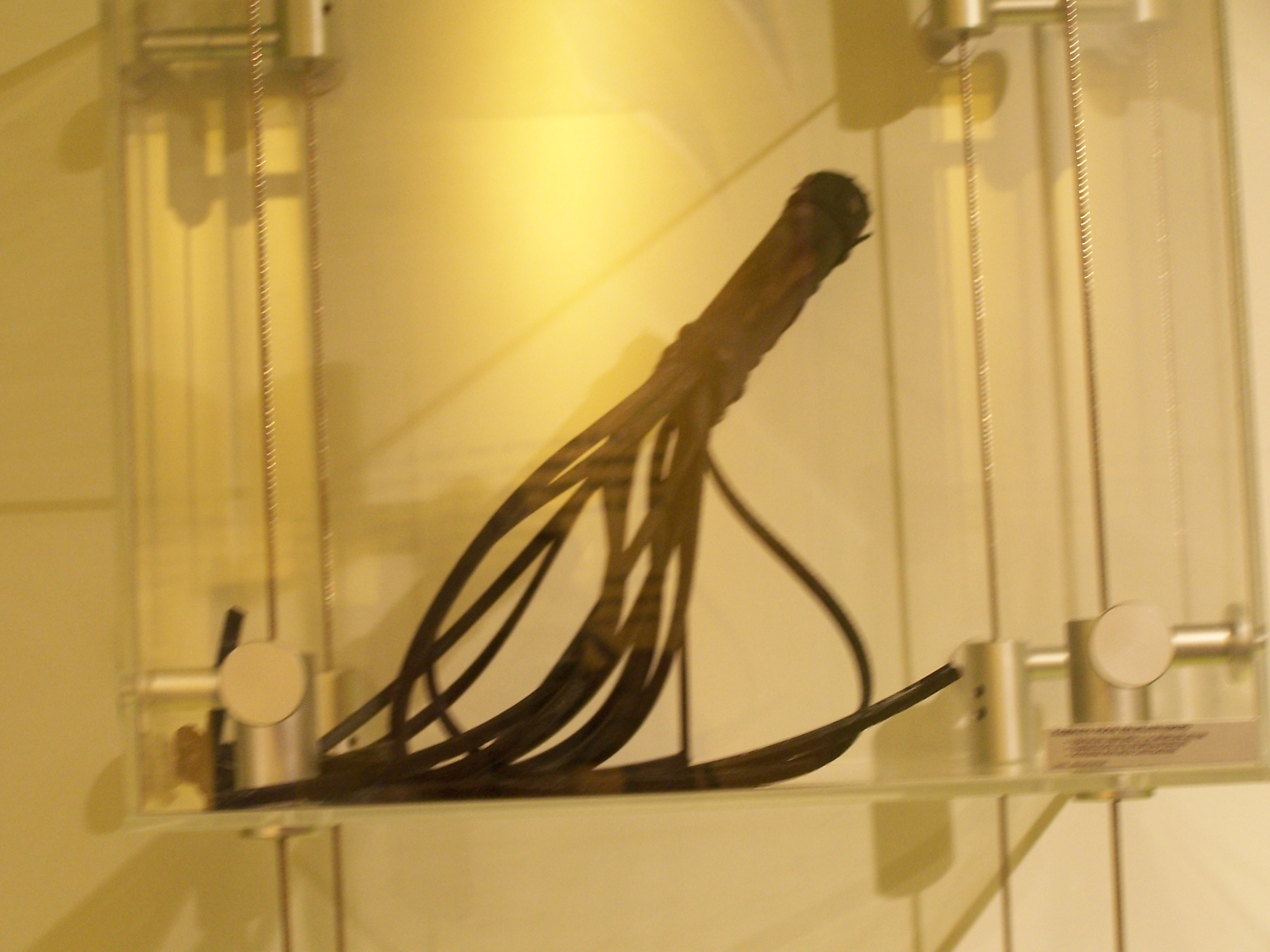
Reproduction of a medieval scourge

A scourge (Latin: flagrum; diminutive: flagellum) consists of a rope with metal balls, bones, and metal spikes.

== History ==
=== Symbol of Osiris ===
The scourge, or flail, and the crook are the two symbols of power and domination depicted in the hands of Osiris in Egyptian monuments. The shape of the flail or scourge is unchanged throughout history. However, when a scourge is described as a 'flail' as depicted in Egyptian mythology, it may be referring to use as an agricultural instrument. A flail's intended use was to thresh wheat, not to implement corporal punishment. However, it is now speculated to have been neither a whip nor a flail, but instead to be a symbolic representation of a device for collecting labdanum.

=== Use by the priests of Cybele ===
The priests of Cybele scourged themselves and others. Such stripes were considered sacred.

=== Flagellation of Jesus and other Roman uses ===
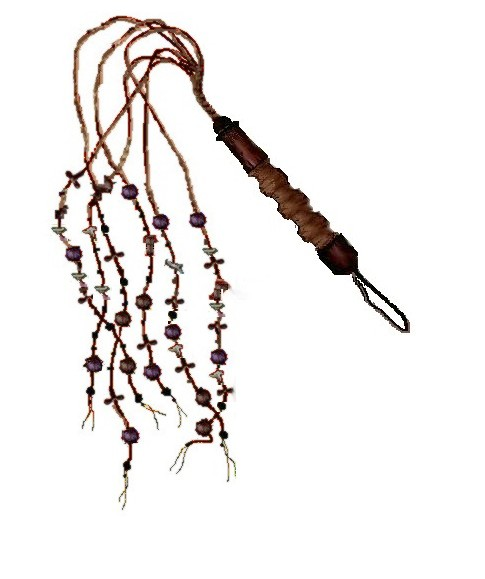
Roman Flagrum

Hard material can be affixed to multiple thongs to give a flesh-tearing "bite". A scourge with these additions is called a scorpion. Scorpio is Latin for a Roman flagrum and is referred to in the Bible: 1 Kings 12:11: "...My father scourged you with whips; I will scourge you with scorpions" said Rehoboam, referring to increased conscription and taxation beyond Solomon's. The name testifies to the pain caused by the arachnid. Testifying to its frequent Roman application is the existence of the Latin words Flagrifer 'carrying a whip' and Flagritriba 'often-lashed slave'.

According to the Gospel of John, Pontius Pilate, the Roman governor of Judaea, ordered Jesus to be scourged before his crucifixion. Josephus records the scourging of Jesus ben Ananias, a Jew who repeatedly prophesized Jerusalem's impending destruction; after each lash, he declared "Woe to the Jerusalemites" and was ultimately released by procurator Albinus (r. 62–64 AD), who considered him a madman. In 66 AD, during the events leading up to the First Jewish–Roman War, Roman authorities under procurator Florus scourged and crucified many inhabitants of Jerusalem, including women and children. Later, in 71 AD, Simon bar Giora, a leader of the revolt, was scourged shortly before his execution on the Capitoline Hill, following his appearance in the Roman triumph celebrating the conquest of Jerusalem.

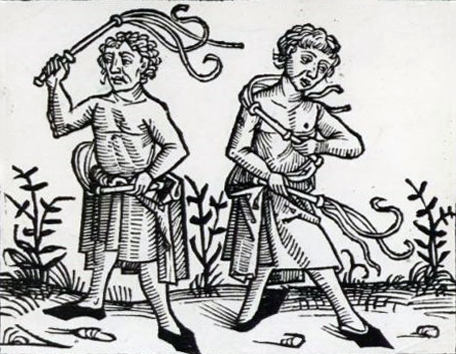
Fifteenth-century woodcut of flagellants scourging themselves

=== Use to enforce discipline in Christian monasteries ===
Scourging was adopted as a sanction in the monastic discipline of the fifth and following centuries. Early in the fifth century it is mentioned by Palladius of Galatia in the Historia Lausiaca, and Socrates Scholasticus tells us that, instead of being excommunicated, offending young monks were scourged. (See the sixth-century rules of St. Cæsarius of Arles for nuns, and of St. Aurelian of Arles.) Thenceforth scourging is frequently mentioned in monastic rules and councils as an enforcer of discipline.

Its use as a punishment was general in the seventh century in all monasteries of the severe Columban rule.

=== Use for punishment in canon law ===
Canon law (Decree of Gratian, Decretals of Gregory IX) recognized it as a punishment for ecclesiastics; even as late as the sixteenth and seventeenth centuries, it appears in ecclesiastical legislation as a punishment for blasphemy, concubinage and simony. Scourging as a means of penance and mortification is publicly exemplified in the tenth and eleventh centuries by the lives of St. Dominic Loricatus and St. Peter Damian (died 1072). The latter wrote a special treatise in praise of self-flagellation; though blamed by some contemporaries for excess of zeal, his example and the high esteem in which he was held did much to popularize the voluntary use of a small scourge known as a discipline, as a means of mortification and penance.

=== Flagellants and use by royalty for self-discipline ===
From then on the practice appeared in most medieval religious orders and associations. The fourteenth-century Flagellants were named for their self-flagellation; King Louis IX of France and Elisabeth of Hungary also made private use of the "discipline".

== Metaphorical Usage ==
Semi-literal uses such as "the scourge of God" for Attila the Hun (i.e. "God's whip with which to punish the nations") led to metaphoric uses to mean a severe affliction, e.g. "the scourge of drug abuse".

== See also ==
- Cat o' nine tails
- Flagellation, includes flogging
- Discipline (instrument of penance)
- Knout
