= Ishmael ben Fabus =

1st century CE High Priest of Israel

Ishmael ben Fabus, also known as Ishmael ben Phiabi and Ishmael ben Phabi (Hebrew: ישמעאל בן פיאבי), was a High Priest of Israel in the 1st century CE.

He was High Priest of Israel from 15 CE to 16 CE under the Roman procurator, Valerius Gratus, and is thought to be the same High Priest who was reinstated by Agrippa II in 58 CE to 62 CE.

Ishmael ben Fabus not only appears in the writings of the historian Josephus, but also in the compendium of Jewish Oral Law known as the Mishnah (Parah 3:5), compiled in 189 CE, and where it makes note that Ishmael ben Fabus (Phiabi) officiated over the preparation of the red heifer, whose ashes were used in purifying those who had been defiled by corpse uncleanness.

An oral teaching preserved in the Tosefta (Parah 3:6) relates that Ishmael ben Fabus (Phiabi) the High Priest had initially prepared two red heifers; the ashes of one used for those who had immersed themselves in a ritual bath that selfsame day, but had not waited till the sun had set – a condition known as tevul yom, and the ashes of the other used for those who had already immersed themselves and had waited till the sun had set. Ishmael's contemporaries reprimanded him for having required a man to be sprinkled twice by the waters and ashes of the red heifer. He stood corrected, conceding that he had erred, seeing that it was only necessary to be sprinkled with the ashes immediately following an immersion in a ritual bath, without the necessity of repeating the process after sunset.

It is said of him that he was "the handsomest man of his time, whose effeminate love of luxury was the scandal of the age."

Although his tenure as High Priest (Kohen Gadol) coincides with the life of Jesus of Nazareth, he does not appear in the writings of the New Testament. His priesthood was marked by a time of turbulence in Jewish politics, with the role of the high priesthood being contended for by several families of the priestly stock. The Mishnah describes his tenure as High Priest as a successful one: "When R. Ishmael b. Piabi (Fabus) died the splendour of the priesthood ceased." Abba Saul ben Batnit and Abba Jose ben Johanan are said to have composed a ditty satirizing the tyrannical conduct of the high priestly class in the last decades of the Second Temple, and especially during the tenure of the High Priest Ishmael ben Fabus, whose servants were unrelenting in extracting the priestly dues and would use force to do so.

Ishmael ben Fabus's imaginative appeal has inspired the writing of the fictional novel, Ben-Hur

== Family ==
He was a descendant of John Hyrcanus, a scion of the House of Asmoneus. His grandson is believed to have been Rabbi Ishmael of the Sages, and he may have been related to the former High Priest Joshua, son of Fabus.

Jewish titles
Preceded by Annas	High Priest of Israel; 15–16 AD	Succeeded by Eleazar ben Ananus
Preceded by Jonathan	High Priest of Israel; 58–62 AD	Succeeded by Joseph Cabi ben Simon
