= Annas =

1st-century CE high priest of the Roman province of Judaea

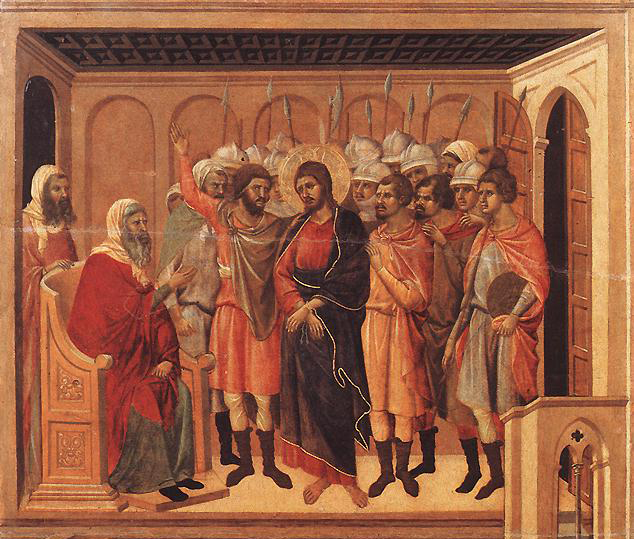
"Christ before Annas" (Duccio di Buoninsegna), c. 1308–11)

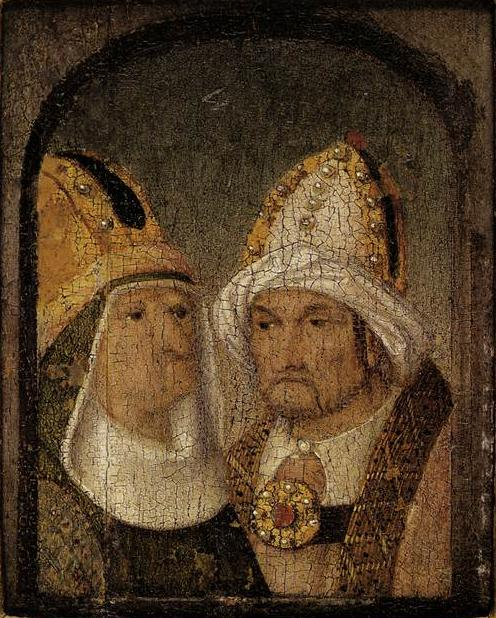
"Annas and Caiaphas" (Dutch, c. 1500)

Annas ben Seth (also called Ananus Hebrew: חָנָן, Ḥānān; Koine Greek: Ἅννας, Hánnas) was High Priest of Judaea from 6 AD to 15 AD.

He was appointed by the Roman legate Quirinius just after the Romans had deposed Archelaus, Ethnarch of Judaea, thereby putting Judaea directly under Roman rule.

Annas appears in the Gospels and Passion plays as a High Priest before whom Jesus is brought for judgment, prior to being brought before Pontius Pilate.

== The sacerdotal family ==
Annas, his five sons, and his son-in-law Caiaphas, were all appointed as High Priest at some time in their lives. The terms of the seven men were as follows;

=== Ananus (Annas), son of Seth (6–15) ===
Annas served officially as High Priest for ten years (AD 6–15), and was then deposed by the procurator Valerius Gratus. Yet while having been officially removed from office, he remained as one of the nation's most influential political and social individuals, aided greatly by the fact that his five sons and his son-in-law Caiaphas all served at sometime as High Priests. His death is unrecorded. His son Annas the Younger, also known as Ananus the son of Ananus, was assassinated in AD 66 for advocating peace with Rome.

Jewish titles
Preceded by Joazar ben Boethus	High Priest of Israel c.6—15	Succeeded by Ishmael ben Fabus

=== Eleazar ben Ananus (16–17) ===
After Valerius Gratus deposed Ishmael ben Fabus from the high priesthood, he installed Eleazar ben Ananus, (15—16), a descendant of John Hyrcanus. It was a time of turbulence in Jewish politics, with the role of the high priesthood being contended for by several priestly families. Eleazar was likewise deposed by Gratus, who gave the office to Simon ben Camithus (17-18).

Jewish titles
Preceded by Ishmael ben Fabus	High Priest of Israel; 16-17	Succeeded by Simon ben Camithus

=== Caiaphas (18–36) ===
Caiaphas was married to the daughter of Annas (John 18:13). Gratus made him high priest after depriving Simon ben Camithus of the office. The comparatively long eighteen-year tenure of Caiaphas suggests he had established a good working relationship with the Roman authorities. Gratus' successor Pontius Pilate retained him as high priest.

Jewish titles
Preceded by Simon ben Camithus	High Priest of Israel; 18-36	Succeeded by Jonathan ben Ananus

=== Jonathan ben Ananus (36–37) ===
Jonathan ben Ananus was the only family member to become High Priest twice. After his retirement he was murdered after publicly criticizing the Roman procurator, Antonius Felix.

Jewish titles
Preceded by Caiaphas	High Priest of Israel; 36—37	Succeeded by Theophilus ben Ananus

=== Theophilus ben Ananus (37–41) ===
Theophilus was the third of Annas' sons to become High Priest. It has been suggested that the Gospel of Luke was dedicated to him, but this identification is controversial.

Jewish titles
Preceded by Jonathan ben Ananus	High Priest of Israel; 37—41	Succeeded by Simon Cantatheras ben Boethus

=== Matthias ben Ananus (43) ===
Jewish titles
Preceded by Simon Cantatheras ben Boethus	High Priest of Israel; 43	Succeeded by Elioneus ben Simon Cantatheras

=== Jonathan ben Ananus (44) ===
Jonathan was brought back as High Priest for a few months, until Josephus ben Camydus took on the post.

Jewish titles
Preceded by Elioneus ben Simon Cantatheras	High Priest of Israel; 44	Succeeded by Josephus ben Camydus

=== Ananus ben Ananus (63) ===
Ananus II was responsible for the execution of James the brother of Jesus. This was carried out without the permission of the new Roman consel Lucceius Albinus, and Ananus II was removed from his post as punishment.

Jewish titles
Preceded by Joseph Cabi ben Simon	High Priest of Israel; 63	Succeeded by Jesus son of Damneus

=== High Priest post ===
References in the Mosaic Law to "the death of the high priest" (Numbers 35:25, 28) suggest that the high-priesthood was ordinarily held for life. The post would then go to the High Priest's son. This tradition continued until the rule of the Hasmoneans in 167 BC. According to (Luke 3:2), Annas was still called "high priest" after his dismissal, perhaps in respect of the old tradition.

Before 191 BC the High Priest acted as the ex officio head of the Sanhedrin, However, this changed when the Sanhedrin lost confidence in the High Priest's ability to serve as its head. As such, it is unlikely that Annas was recognised as head of the Sanhedrin.

== In the New Testament ==
=== The trial of Jesus ===
Although Caiaphas was the properly appointed high priest, Annas, being his father-in-law and a former incumbent of the office, possibly retained some of the power attached to the position. According to the Gospel of John (the event is not mentioned in other accounts), Jesus was first brought before Annas, whose palace was closer. Annas questioned him regarding his disciples and teaching, and then sent him on to Caiaphas, where some members of the Sanhedrin had met, and where in Matthew's account the first trial of Jesus took place (Matthew 26:57–68).

=== In the Book of Acts ===
After Pentecost, Annas presided over the Sanhedrin before which the Apostles Peter and John were brought (Acts 4:6).

== Cultural references ==
Annas has an important role in Jesus Christ Superstar, as one of the two main antagonists of the show (the other being Caiaphas) spurring Pontius Pilate to take action against Jesus. In almost all versions, Annas has a high voice to contrast against Caiaphas' bass. Despite being Caiaphas' father-in-law, Annas is generally played by a younger actor.

== See also ==
- High Priest of Israel
- List of biblical figures identified in extra-biblical sources
