= Phannias ben Samuel =

1st-century CE high priest of Israel

- פנחס בן שמואל

83rd and last High Priest of Israel
- In office c. 67 CE – 70 CE
- Preceded by: Mattathias ben Theophilus
- Succeeded by: Office extinct

Personal details
- Born: Pinhas ben Shmuel Aphtha
- Died: 70 CE Jerusalem
- Parent: Samuel (father)

Phannias ben Samuel (in Hebrew: פנחס בן שמואל Pinhas ben Shmuel) (c. 70 CE) was the last Jewish High Priest, the 83rd since Aaron. He was from the 'tribe' of Eniachin (priestly order Jachin) and did not originate from one of the six families from whom high priests had traditionally been chosen. Rather, he was chosen based on the casting of lots. According to rabbinic sources, he was either a stone-cutter or farmer, possibly the son-in-law of Hanania ben Gamliel. He was a leader of revolutionary forces and died during the destruction of Herod's Temple in 70 CE.

In order to see how far their power extended, the Zealots

...undertook to dispose of the high priesthood by casting lots for it, whereas, as we have said already, it was to descend by succession in a family. The pretense they made for this strange attempt was an ancient practice, while they said that of old it was determined by lot; but in truth, it was no better than a dissolution of an undeniable law, and a cunning contrivance to seize upon the government, derived from those that presumed to appoint governors as they themselves pleased. Hereupon they sent for one of the pontifical tribes, which is called Eniachin, and cast lots which of it should be the high priest. By fortune the lot so fell as to demonstrate their iniquity after the plainest manner, for it fell upon one whose name was Phannias, the son of Samuel, of the village Aphtha. He was a man not only unworthy of the high priesthood, but that did not well know what the high priesthood was, such a mere rustic was he! Yet did they hail this man, without his own consent, out of the country, as if they were acting a play upon the stage, and adorned him with a counterfeit thee; they also put upon him the sacred garments, and upon every occasion instructed him what he was to do. This horrid piece of wickedness was sport and pastime with them, but occasioned the other priests, who at a distance saw their law made a jest of, to shed tears, and sorely lament the dissolution of such a sacred dignity.
