= Luke 1 =

- ← Mark 16 chapter 2 →
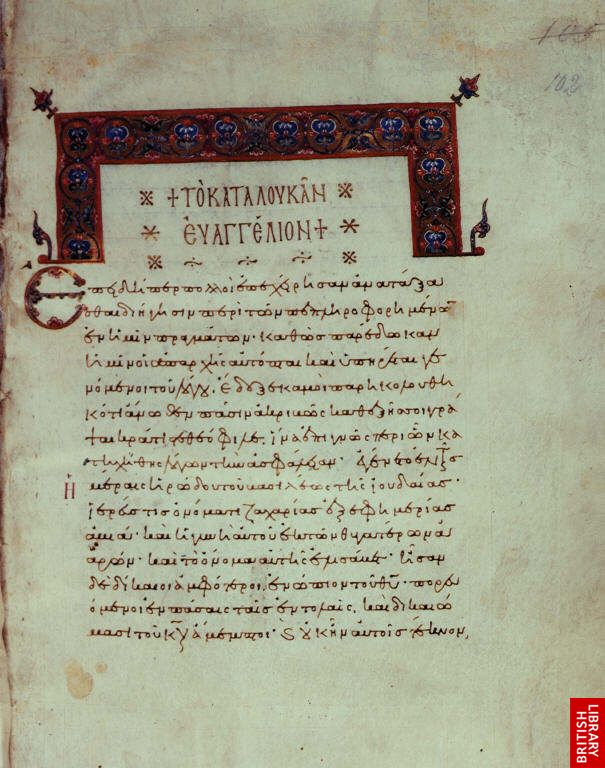
- The beginning of the Gospel of Luke (chapter 1:1–7a), folio 102 in Minuscule 481, made in 10th century
- Book: Gospel of Luke
- Category: Gospel
- Christian Bible part: New Testament
- Order in the Christian part: 3

Luke 1 is the first chapter of the Gospel of Luke in the New Testament of the Christian Bible. With 80 verses, it is one of the longest chapters in the New Testament. This chapter describes the birth of John the Baptist and the events leading up to the birth of Jesus. Two canticles, the canticle of Mary (the Magnificat) and the canticle of Zechariah (the Benedictus), are both contained within this chapter. The unnamed author of Luke names its recipient, Theophilus, who is most likely a real (but unknown) person, but the term could simply mean a fellow believer, since theo philus is Greek for God lover. Early Christian tradition uniformly affirms that Luke composed this Gospel as well as the Acts of the Apostles, the companion volume to Luke, which is addressed to Theophilus in the same way. The title "The Gospel of Luke", found in many Bibles and some manuscripts, was added later with no indication that it was originally part of the text.

== Text ==
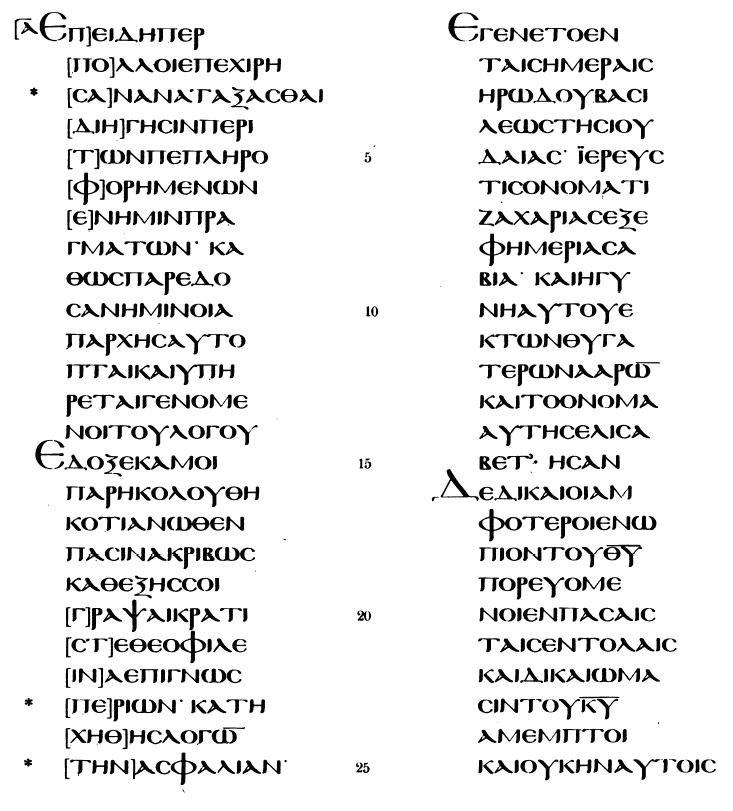
Luke 1:1–7 in Codex Nitriensis (c. 550), Tischendorf's edition

The original text was written in Koine Greek. This chapter is divided into 80 verses.

=== Textual witnesses ===
Some early manuscripts containing the text of this chapter are:

- Papyrus 4 (AD 150–175; extant verses: 58–59; 62–80)
- Papyrus 75 (175–225)
- Codex Vaticanus (325–350; complete)
- Codex Sinaiticus (330–360)
- Codex Bezae (~400)
- Codex Washingtonianus (~400)
- Codex Alexandrinus (400–440)
- Codex Ephraemi Rescriptus (~450; extant verses 3–80)
- Papyrus 42 (6th/7th century; extant: Greek verses 54–55; Coptic verses 46–51)
- Minuscule 481 (10th century)

=== Old Testament references ===
- Luke 1:17: Malachi 4:5–6 (Malachi 3:23-24 in Hebrew Bibles)
- Luke 1:49: Psalm 111:9c
- Luke 1:50: Psalm 103:17
- Luke 1:51: Psalm 89:10
- Luke 1:53: Psalm 107:9
- Luke 1:54: Psalm 98:3
- Luke 1:68: Psalm 41:13; Psalm 72:18; Psalm 106:48; Psalm 111:9a
- Luke 1:69: Psalm 132:17c
- Luke 1:71: Psalm 106:10
- Luke 1:72: Psalm 106:45
- Luke 1:72–73: Psalm 105:8–9

== Prologue (1:1–4) ==
The evangelist, Luke, begins his "orderly account" with the following statement:

^{1}Inasmuch as many have taken in hand to set in order a narrative of those things which have been fulfilled among us, ^{2}just as those who from the beginning were eyewitnesses and ministers of the word delivered them to us, ^{3}it seemed good to me also, having had perfect understanding of all things from the very first, to write to you an orderly account, most excellent Theophilus, ^{4}that you may know the certainty of those things in which you were instructed.

The Gospel of Luke is unique among the canonical gospels for declaring the purpose and method of his work in a prologue, trying to render the Christian message in a higher literary plane. The author both classifies himself as among the many who previously attempted to write narratives of Christ while using claims of careful investigation, orderly writing, and access to eyewitnesses to demonstrate his gospel’s superiority to its predecessors. The narrative is asserted to be an accurate history and intended to confirm the things that Theophilus has already been taught about Jesus, being written by a believer for the purpose of confirming belief, and endowing certainty.

The writer clearly states there are other accounts about Jesus circulating and he is aware of them. Protestant theologian Heinrich August Wilhelm Meyer and Lutheran biblical commentator Johann Albrecht Bengel think that Mark is among those Luke has in mind, but Bengel suggests that Matthew and John were not. Luke also states he is not himself an eyewitness but belongs to another generation that received its information from "eyewitnesses" to these events in a previous generation. Some argue Luke refers to two groups: eyewitnesses and ministers, but most support descriptions for a singular group. According to Brown the author conveys that he searched things carefully and reordered them logically. Luke seeks to assure Theophilus in his theological instruction rather than reporting objectively, though his work is rooted in traditions from the eyewitnesses and ministers. Some sections of Acts, however, have the author relating events with the author and Paul together.

According to Franciscan theologian Robert J. Karris, "Luke alone of the evangelists introduces his work with ... finely crafted, periodic Greek." The first sentence gives the "since" clause, the main clause is given in the first part of the second sentence, and the purpose clause is given by "so that you may know...". Luke uses the word Greek: επειδηπερ, epeidēper, "inasmuch as", or "since indeed", to commence his account. This literary word does not appear elsewhere in the New Testament or in the Septuagint, the Greek text of the Hebrew Bible, although it was frequently used by other classical writers. Luke uses diēgēsis for "an account", which taken alone seems to mean a personal storytelling, but when compared to other usages at the time, such as with the works of Josephus, is to be taken as meaning a well planned account, although he might use it in the original meaning in Luke 8:39. He uses the word καθεξης (kathexēs) for orderly account, which would mean a logical, spatial, or chronological account. Karris argues that the use of the word as well in Acts indicated that Luke is composing in a logical sequence, with Luke building a logical argument for his view of God fulfilling his promises through Jesus. Many scholars have seen parallels between this style and the openings to the Greek histories of Herodotus and Thucydides as well as scientific manuals and treatises of the Hellenistic world. Meyer reads τὴν ἀσφάλειαν (tēn asphaleian) as an emphatic statement, "the unchangeable certainty, [whose] character [is] not to be shaken".

In the opening of the Acts of the Apostles, the writer refers back to this text as "the former account I made ... of all that Jesus began both to do and teach".

== John the Baptist's parents (1:5–25) ==
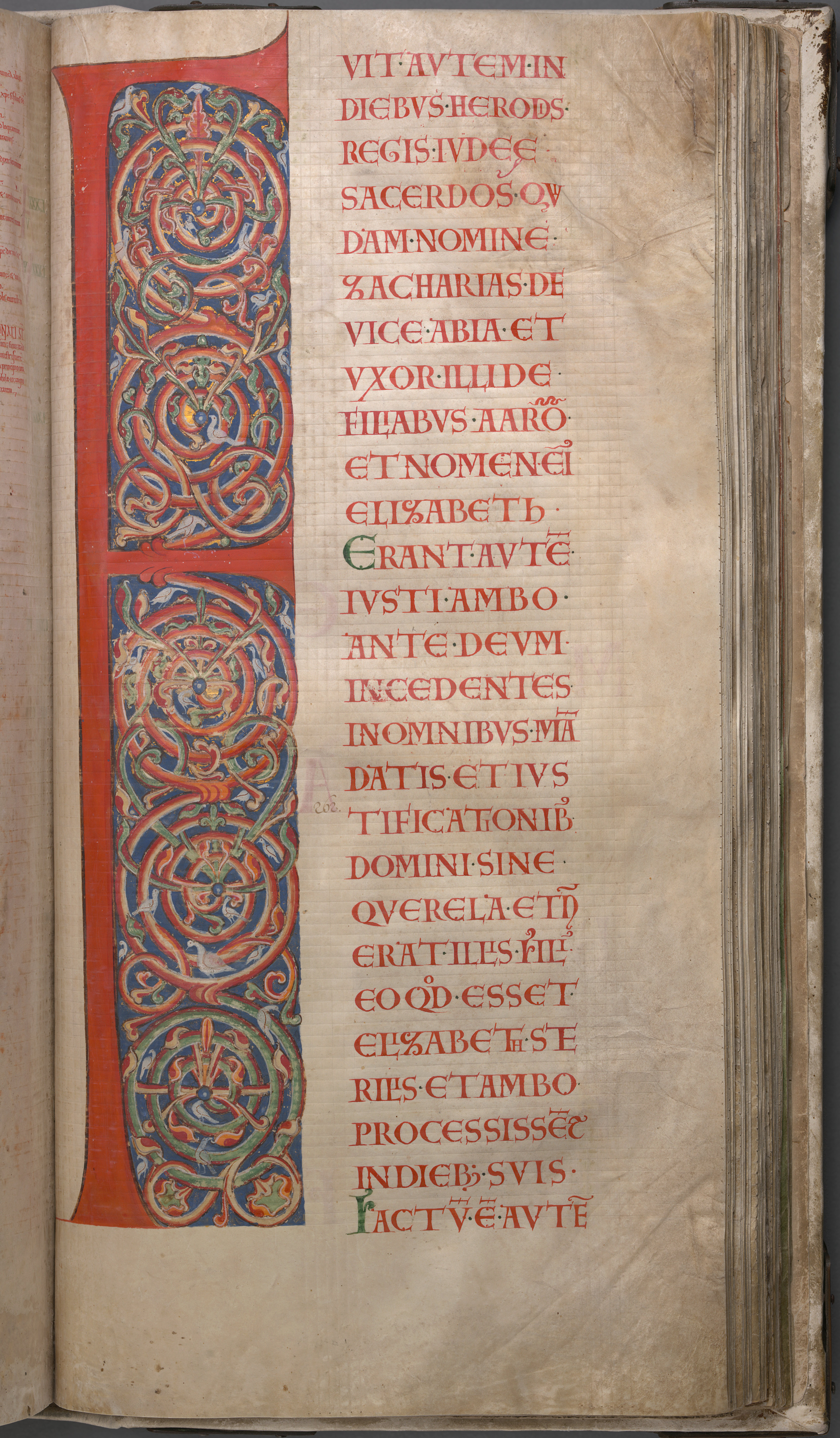
The Latin text of Luke 1:5–8 in Codex Gigas (13th century)

=== Verse 5 ===
There was in the days of Herod, the king of Judea, a certain priest named Zechariah, of the division of Abijah. And his wife was of the daughters of Aaron, and her name was Elizabeth.

Luke begins to show what he thinks of as the fulfillment of God's promises. He gives us a description of John the Baptist's parents, Zechariah, a priest of the Abijah priestly division (1 Chronicles 24:10), and Elizabeth, a descendant of Aaron. They are both getting old and have no children. Luke says this all occurs during the reign of "Herod king of Judea" (Luke 1:5), who is identified as Herod the Great (reign: 37–4 BCE).

Zechariah is on duty one day and goes into the Temple to light incense. During this time, priests served in the temple once a week twice a year, there being twenty four divisions of priests. Luke says εγενετο δε (egeneto de, "...it so happened...") that he was on duty at the time. Some scholars see this as Luke imitating the style of the Septuagint in order to make his book sound like the Jewish scriptures. The majority of modern English translations choose not to include this phrase.

The Angel Gabriel appears to him and tells him he will soon have a son, to name him John, and to not allow him any alcoholic drinks, and that "he will be great in the sight of Jehovah" (verse 15). Numbers 6:3 has abstaining from alcohol as a requirement to be a nazarite. Zechariah doubts Gabriel and Gabriel takes away his power of speech until this happens. Zechariah leaves the temple, unable to speak, and goes home. Elizabeth is soon pregnant. She declares "he has shown his favor and taken away my disgrace among the people" (verse 25). Infertility was often believed to be proof of disfavor with God. Similarly Rachel, wife of Jacob, had said “God has taken away my reproach", when she bore a son.

Luke thus starts with the Temple and then ends the book at the Temple in Luke 24:53: they were continually in the temple praising and blessing God. Zechariah, being unable to speak and so complete his liturgy, may be contrasted with the "good news" brought by Jesus.

There is much debate on the historicity of this information, as skeptics would reject appearances by angels and God's intervention in history in this manner. Whether one believes in such things or not, it is entirely possible that John's parents were childless throughout most of their life until John's birth. Some see Luke as taking a historical event or tradition he received and interpreting it in terms of events in the Old Testament. Very similar narratives recounting the birth of Samson in Judges 13:2–5, as well as Samuel in the opening chapter of 1 Samuel are alluded to. Luke seems to follow an Old Testament pattern in the sequence of his information here, specifically an announcement of impending birth, the child being given a name, and then discussion of their destiny. This pattern can be seen in Genesis with Ishmael in 16:11–12 and Isaac in 17:19. Abraham and Sarah were also childless well into their old age. Josiah is announced this way in 1 Kings 13:2, King Solomon in 1 Chronicles 22:9–10, and the Immanuel prediction, used in Matthew 1:23, from Isaiah 7:14–17. Others see a five step pattern, with two extra steps of objections and confirmatory signs. Gabriel appeared to Daniel in the Book of Daniel 9:21.

== The annunciation (1:26–38) ==
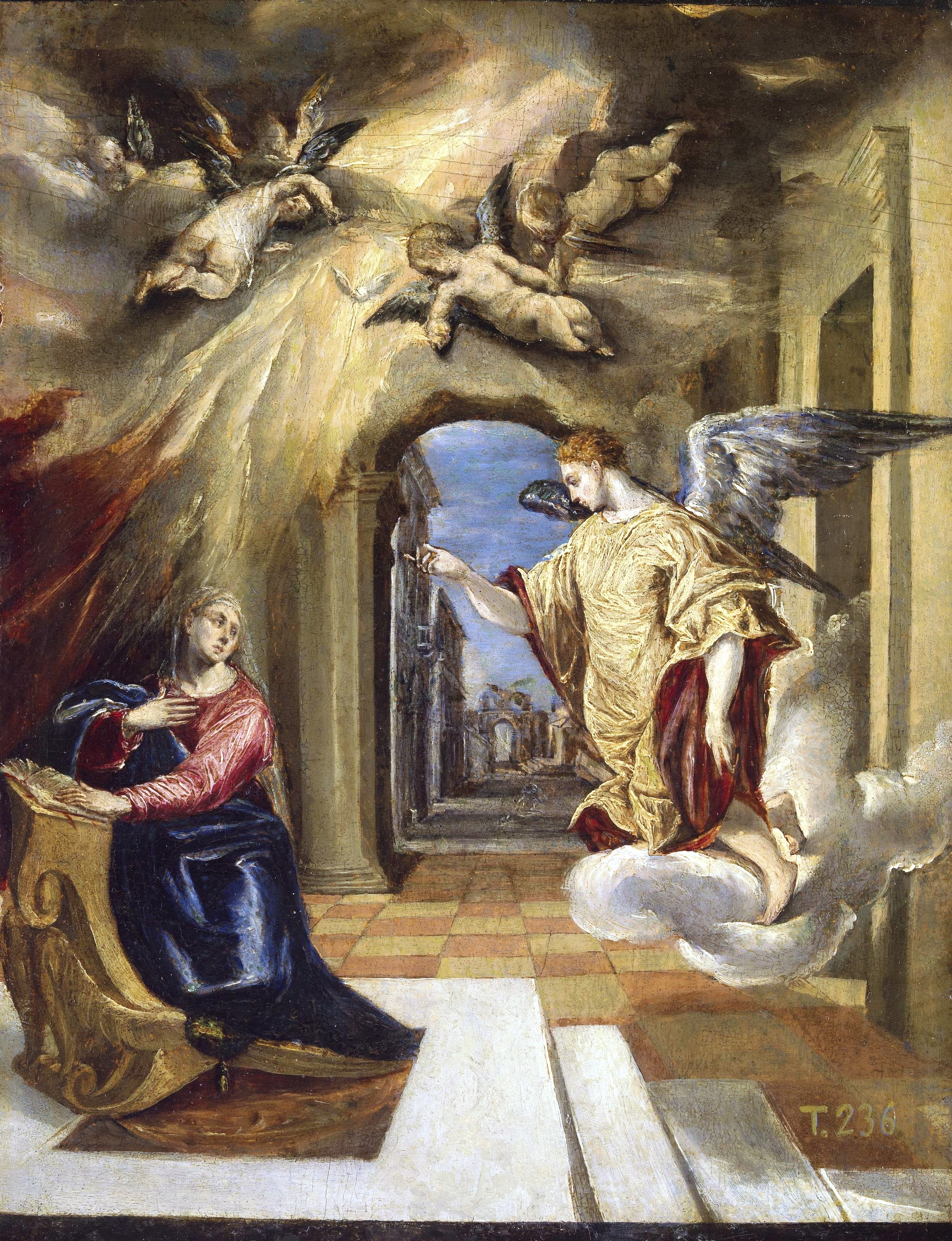
The Annunciation, by El Greco (completed 1575)

Luke then tells the story of Gabriel's visit to Mary, informing her that she will soon have a virgin conception by God. The account is recorded differently in Matthew 1:20, where an unnamed angel appears to Joseph after he has discovered that Mary is pregnant. Gabriel goes to Nazareth and visits Mary, who Luke tells us is a virgin engaged or betrothed to Joseph. The name Mary means "excellence", while Joseph means "May Yahweh add".

Roman Catholic tradition sees in the angel's words addressed to Mary (Luke 1:28-33) an indirect reference to the ever Virgin, celebrated under the official Marian title of Son of Sion. According to the same tradition, this title has been explicitly prophetized in Zephaniah 3:14–18, Joel 2:21–27, Zechariah 2:14–15.

=== Verse 28 ===
And the angel being come in, said unto her: Hail, full of grace, the Lord is with thee: blessed art thou among women.

Gabriel greets her with the word κεχαριτωμενη, kecharitōmenē, meaning favored or graced, presumably by God. The Textus Receptus and some ancient manuscripts have here, "Blessed are you among women", which is omitted in NU. Mary does not seem to understand why she is favored, but Gabriel then tells her:

Do not be afraid, Mary, you have found favor with God. You will be with child and give birth to a son, and you are to give him the name Jesus. He will be great and will be called the Son of the Most High. The Lord God will give him the throne of his father David, and he will reign over the house of Jacob forever; his kingdom will never end.

This announcement seems to follow the same pattern as the announcement of John's birth and is also about fulfillment of God's promises. Theologian Eric Franklin notes that there are parallels in the two accounts, but suggests that the narrative of the annunciation to Mary is the "climax" to which the annunciation to Zechariah only acts as a "prelude".

=== Verse 31 ===
And behold, you will conceive in your womb and bring forth a Son, and shall call His name Jesus.

The name "Jesus", or ιησουν in the Greek text, means "God Saves". Irish Archbishop John McEvilly notes that Mary was to name him, rather than Joseph (cf. Luke 2:21 in some translations, they gave him the name Jesus, and Matthew 1:25, where Joseph gives the child his name).

=== Verses 34–38 ===
Mary asks Gabriel how this can be, since she is a virgin, but Gabriel says God will give her the child, and thus he will be the Son of God. He then points out how her relative Elizabeth, though old, is now carrying a child, and how "nothing is impossible with God" (Luke 1:37). He then leaves her (verse 38). Luke states that Mary is a virgin, and that she is somehow descended from Aaron (since she is a cousin with Elizabeth, descendant of Aaron), but here says Jesus will inherit his "father"'s throne, or David's. According to Luke's genealogy, Jesus' descent from David comes via Joseph. Since David is not of Aaron's line, this may indicate that Mary's mother was a descendant of Aaron and her father a descendant of David.

In Daniel 9:24–27 Gabriel gives a prophecy about seventy weeks and the "Anointed One". If one adds the 180 days that Elizabeth was pregnant before Mary's conception plus the 270 days of Mary's pregnancy plus the forty days of "purification" in Luke 2:22, one gets 490 days, or seventy weeks. Many Christians have seen this as a fulfillment of prophecy, but skeptics tend to counter that Luke could be constructing his story to fit what he sees as fulfillments of prophecy, whether real or not. God's promise of a messiah from the house of David is foretold in 2 Samuel 7.

It is significant that Luke states that Mary lives in Nazareth, considered a small backwater town. He thus has God's grace bestowed on a young, unmarried woman living in an insignificant town. Luke frequently has favor shown on women, sinners, and various "unimportant" people.

Paul the Apostle never explicitly mentions a virgin birth for Jesus, but in Galatians 4:4 he states that "God sent forth His Son, born of a woman", which according to Cornelius a Lapide "denotes conception without a male".

== Mary and Elizabeth (1:39–56) ==
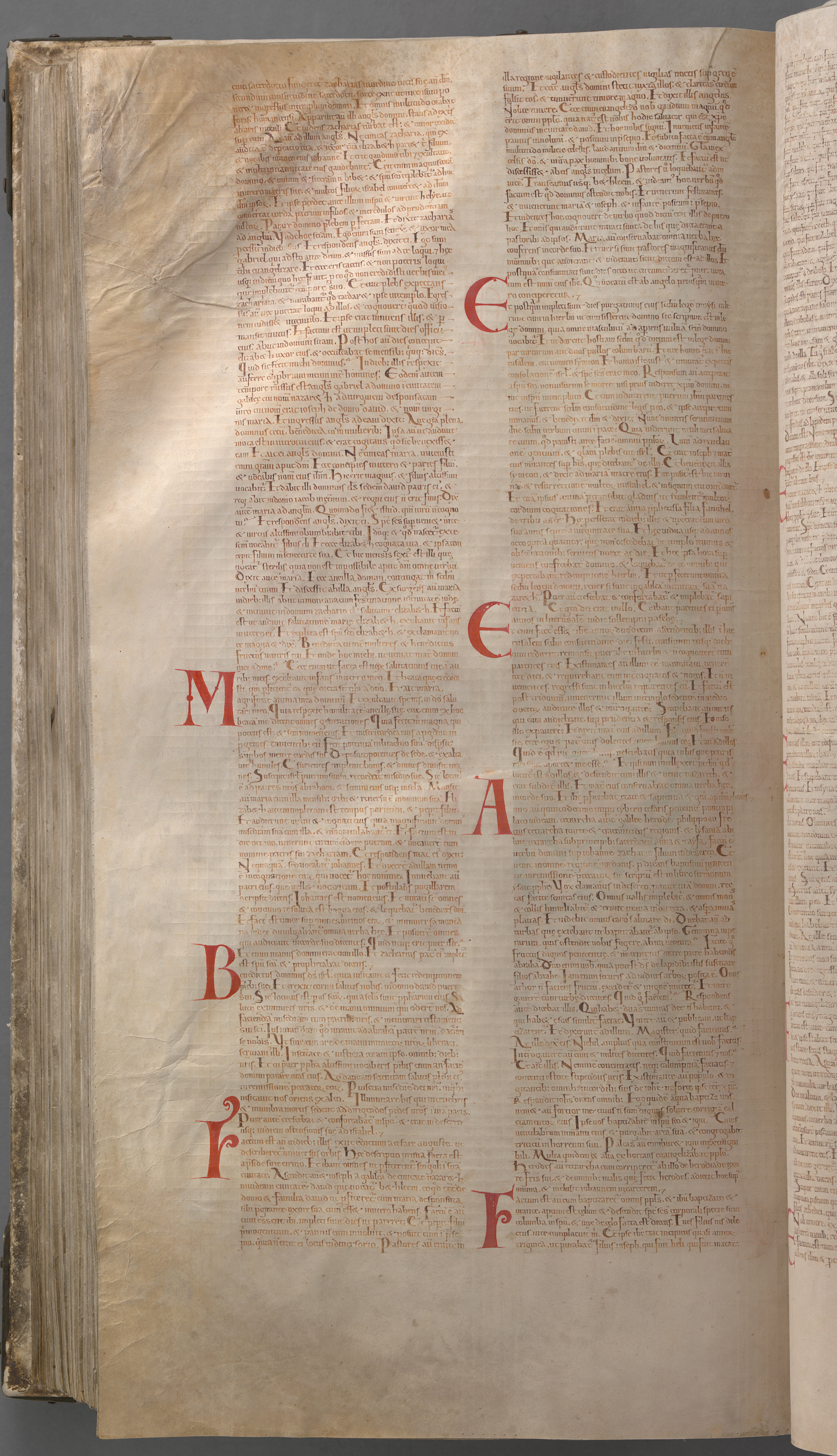
The Latin text of Luke 1:8–3:23 in Codex Gigas (13th century)

Mary then goes and visits her relative Elizabeth. Upon meeting the pregnant Mary, Elizabeth feels John move in her womb and is "filled with the Holy Spirit" (verse 41). This may be related to Genesis 25:22. Elizabeth gives praise to Mary: "Blessed are you among women, and blessed is the fruit of your womb!", words which echo Moses' declaration to the people of Israel in Deuteronomy 7:13: "[God] will love you and bless you and multiply you; He will also bless the fruit of your womb". Mary, in her Magnificat, then gives praise to God: she first thanks God for favoring one so "humble" as herself, then praises God for his "mercy" and "help" to all people. God's mercy (το ελεος αυτου, to eleos autou) is mentioned five times within the Magnificat and Zechariah's Benedictus hymn. Many see the Magnificat patterned on Hannah's prayer in 1 Samuel 2:1–10.

In verses 51–53 Luke uses the past tense six times, implying Jesus' conception has fulfilled or is fulfilling these actions of God. These verses speak of the downfall of the proud and rich and the favor of the downtrodden. This might be a general statement, or an allusion to Israel and its Gentile rulers. Some have speculated these represent Ebionite views. Mary then mentions Abraham, again linking this with God's original covenant. Mary stays for three months and leaves shortly before John's birth. Some find the idea of a young pregnant woman making the trip from the Judean hills to Nazareth improbable, but it is certainly not impossible.

== John the Baptist's birth (1:57–79) ==
Friends and neighbors come to circumcise him and try to name him after his father, but his mother protests and then his father writes down that his name will be John, and is suddenly allowed to speak again. He becomes "...filled with the Holy Spirit...", as his wife before him. He sings a song, the Canticle of Zechariah, praising God. Karris sees relating the circumcision, as Luke also does for Jesus in Luke 2, as Luke's way of linking John and Jesus, and therefore Christianity, to a fulfillment of Israel.

The first part of Zechariah's song praises the still unborn Jesus in verses 68–75. He says "He has raised up a horn of salvation for us in the house of his servant David", with a horn representing strength, such as in Psalms 89:17 and 92:10. (Miller 120) There is then a praising and foretelling of John in verses 76–77, then the song switches back to Jesus in 78–79. Raymond E. Brown thought these sections might have been Jewish Christian hymns linked together by Luke. It is a common thesis that the Magnificat, the Canticle, and the two songs in chapter 2, the Gloria in Excelsis Deo and the Nunc dimittis, were added by Luke to his original composition from a collection of hymns written in Greek. A minority of scholars think the Magnificat and Canticle might be Jewish hymns taken by the Christians, but Jewish hymns of the period reflect a future hope of God's help whereas these refer to it already having been fulfilled. Another group of scholars, also a minority, argue these were originally composed in Aramaic or Hebrew and so might come from original testimony and so usually argue for these songs' historicity. Scholars often see these as primitive and so probably composed before other songs in the New Testament, such as Philippians 2:6–11. David is mentioned in the first section, once again linking Jesus to fulfillment of Israel's past. The song ends with a note of peace, a common Lukan theme. "Peace" is the first thing he says to all the gathered Apostles in Luke 24.

Luke's source for this information is unknown and frequently debated. Even if the Q hypothesis is correct, these stories of John's and Jesus's birth were not in it, nor are they in Mark. Luke does not mention anything about an Angel visiting Joseph, which suggests that either Matthew and Luke received their information on this subject from different sources, or Luke has access to both stories, knows Matthew is already circulating, and is filling in the story told in Matthew. If Luke is right, Jesus and John were cousins of some sort.

=== Verse 76 ===
[Zechariah said:] "And you, child, will be called the prophet of the Highest;

for you will go before the face of the Lord to prepare His ways,"

- "You": here Zechariah is addressing his son, John.
- "Prepare His ways": alludes Isaiah 40:3–5 and Luke 3:1–6.

== John's development (1:80) ==
So the child grew and became strong in spirit, and was in the deserts till the day of his manifestation to Israel.

Luke states in verse 80 that John grew up and went into the deserts (Greek: ἐν ταῖς ἐρήμοις, en tais heremois, plural), more specifically the desert of Judah. This is the only near contemporary account of John's family found anywhere. Raymond E. Brown sees this verse as an echo of the births of Samson in Judges 13:24–25 and Samuel in 1 Samuel 1:21.

== See also ==
- Dead Sea Scrolls 4Q521
- Related Bible parts: Judges 13, 1 Samuel 2, Acts 1

== Sources ==
- Brown, Raymond E. (1997). An Introduction to the New Testament. Doubleday. ISBN 0-385-24767-2.
- Brown, Raymond E.; Fitzmyer, Joseph A.; Murphy, Roland E. (1990). The New Jerome Biblical Commentary. Prentice Hall. ISBN 0-13-614934-0.
- Kirkpatrick, A. F. (1901). The Book of Psalms: with Introduction and Notes. The Cambridge Bible for Schools and Colleges. Vol. Book IV and V: Psalms XC-CL. Cambridge: At the University Press.
- Luke 1 NIV Accessed 15 October 2005
- Miller, Robert, ed. (1992). The Complete Gospels. Polebridge Press. ISBN 0-06-065587-9.

Preceded by Mark 16	Chapters of the Bible; Gospel of Luke	Succeeded by Luke 2
