= Antonio della Corna =

Italian painter

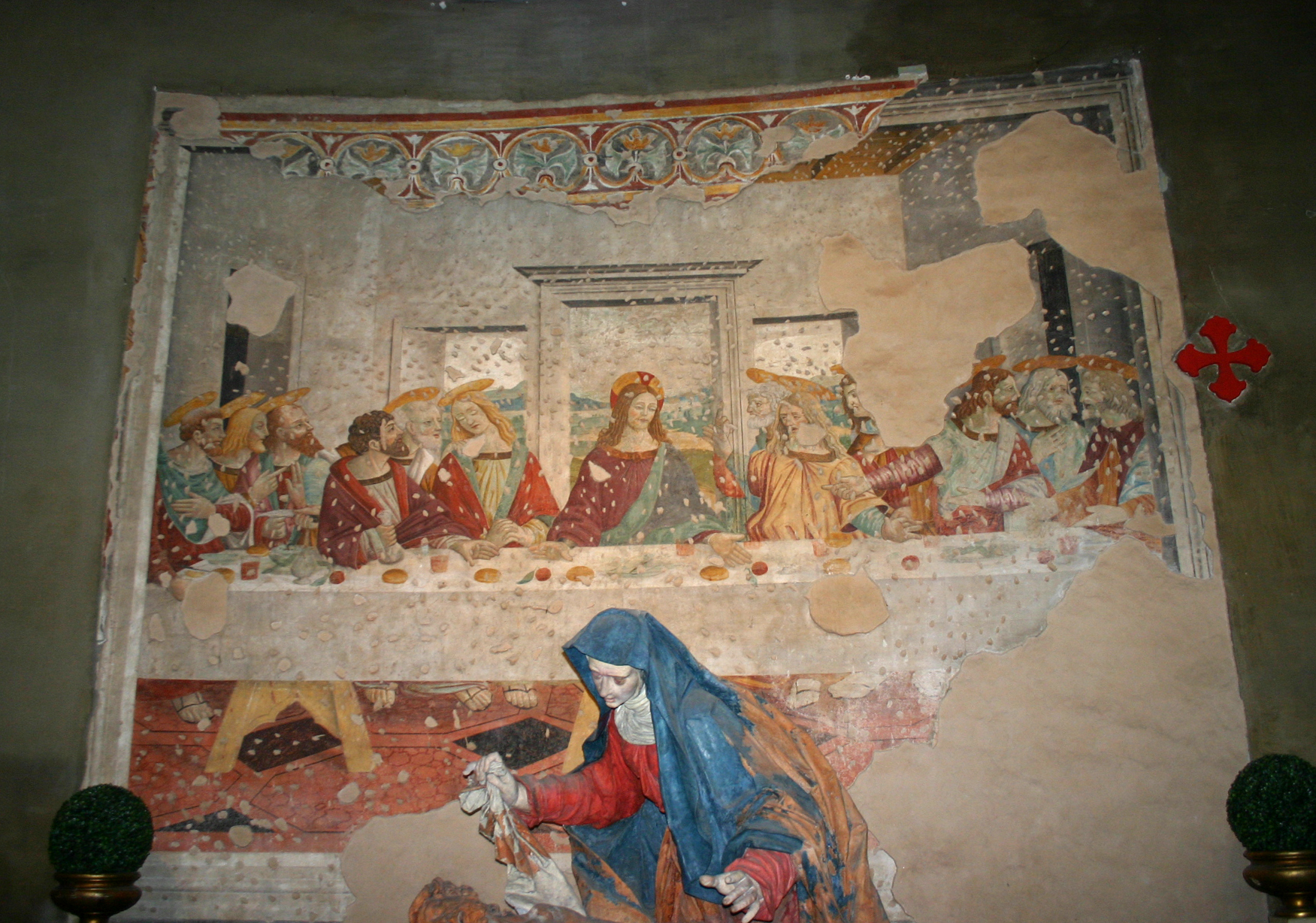
Last Supper, fresco attributed to della Corna, in the Basilica of San Lorenzo, Milan

Antonio della Corna, who lived in the 15th and 16th centuries, was one of the artists called by Lodovico Sforza to decorate the Porta Giovia Palace at Milan in 1490. No dates are known of his birth or death.

Some assign his birthplace to either Cremona or Soncino, and state Andrea Mantegna and Giovanni Bellini as his influences. There are no works by Corna in Cremona or Soncino. The Bignami Collection, near Cassal Maggiore, contains a picture representing a murder taken from the Legend of St. Julian, signed by Antonio in 1478.

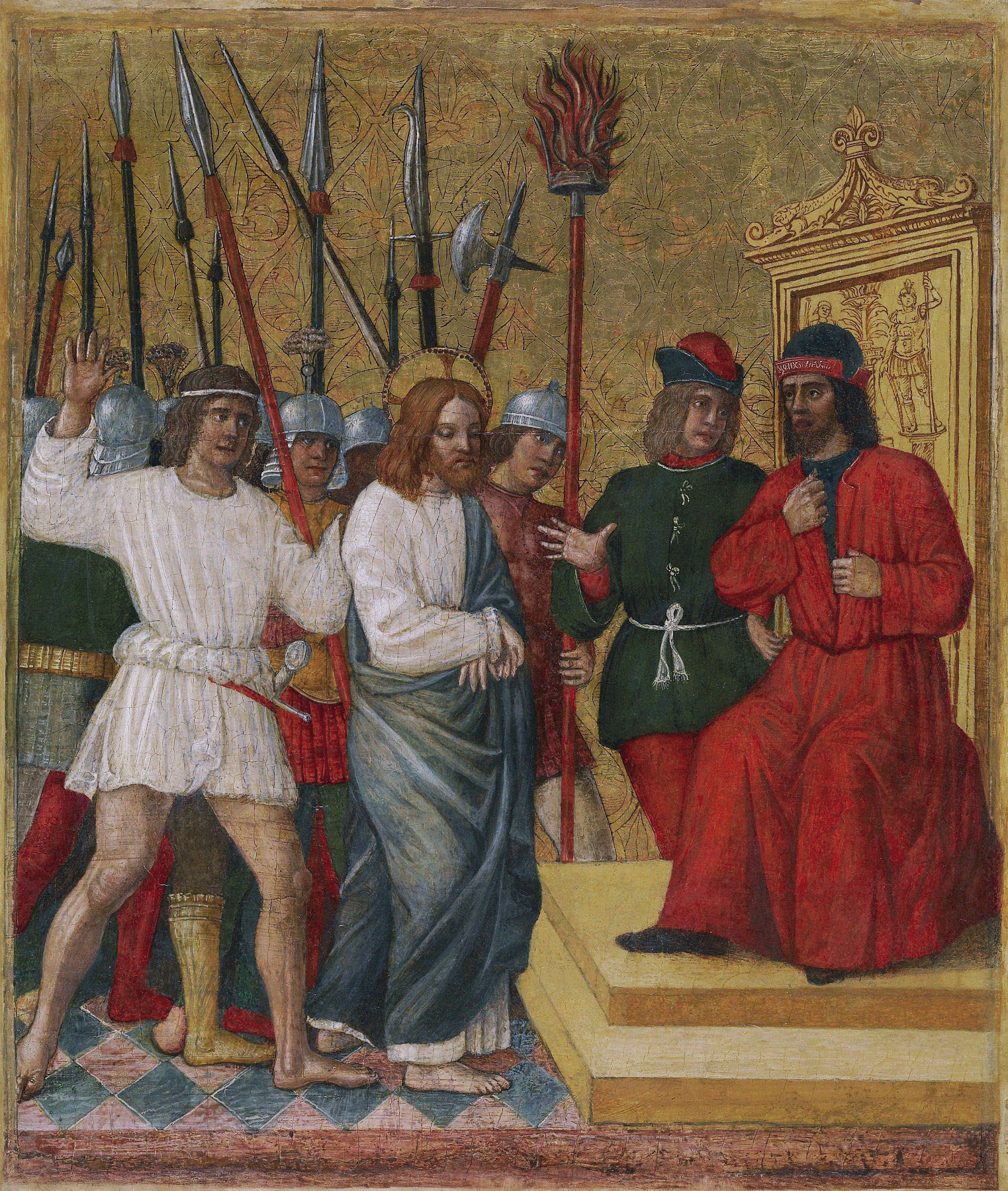
Christ Before Caiaphas. The Walters Art Museum

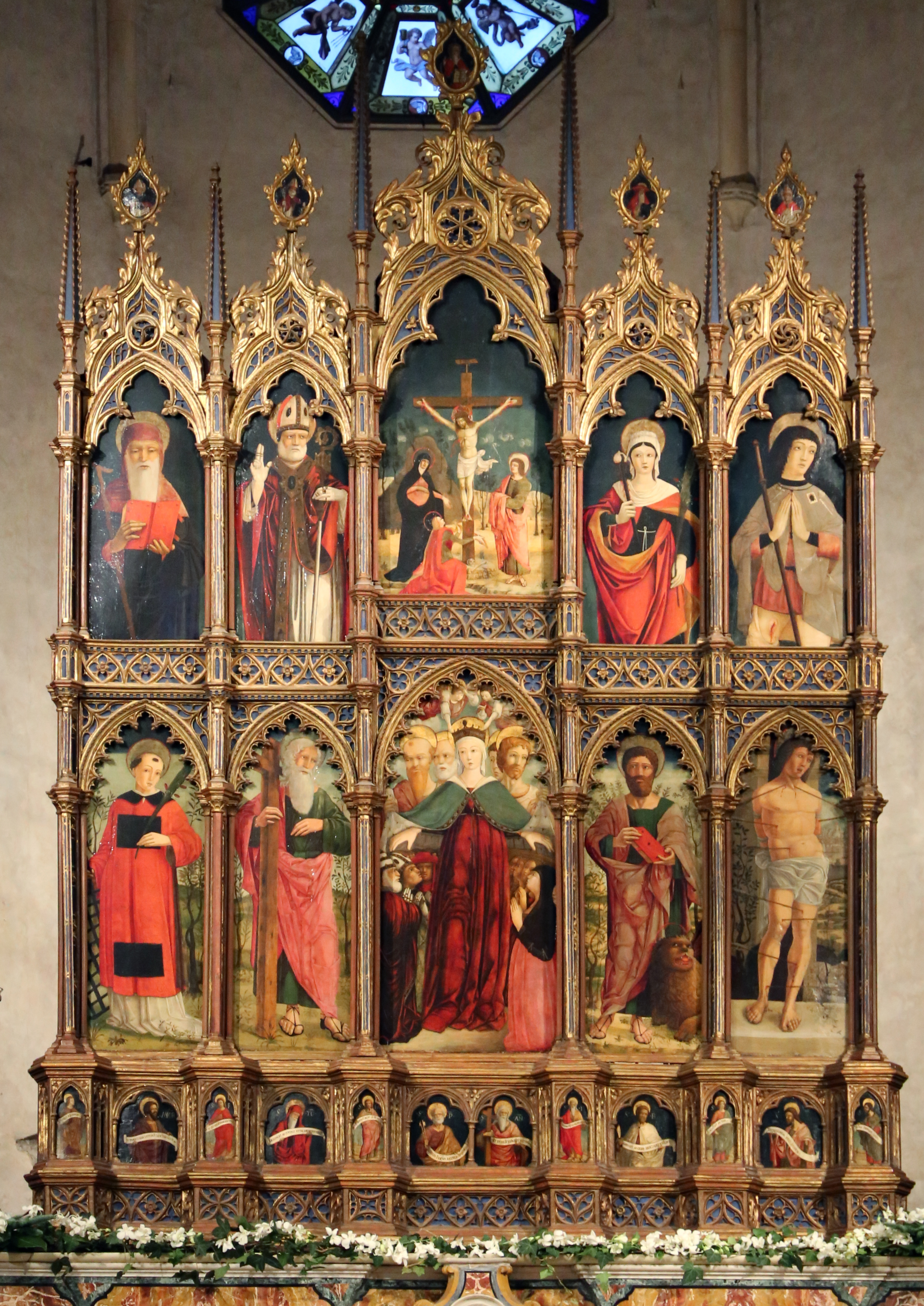
Polyptych of Mercy. Cattedrale di Sant'Andrea
