= Joseph Cabi ben Simon =

1st century CE High Priest of Israel

Joseph Cabi ben Simon was a Herodian-era High Priest of Israel in Jerusalem, Iudaea Province, appointed (and deposed) by Herod Agrippa II.

... the king [Agrippa] . . . gave the high priesthood to Joseph, who was called Cabi, the son of Simon, formerly high priest. And now Caesar, upon hearing the death of Festus, sent Albinus into Judea, as procurator. But the king deprived Joseph of the high priesthood, and bestowed the succession to that dignity on the son of Ananus, who was also himself called Ananus.

Jewish titles
Preceded by Ishmael ben Fabus	High Priest of Israel; 62—63	Succeeded by Ananus ben Ananus
