= Acts 1 =

- ← John 21 chapter 2 →
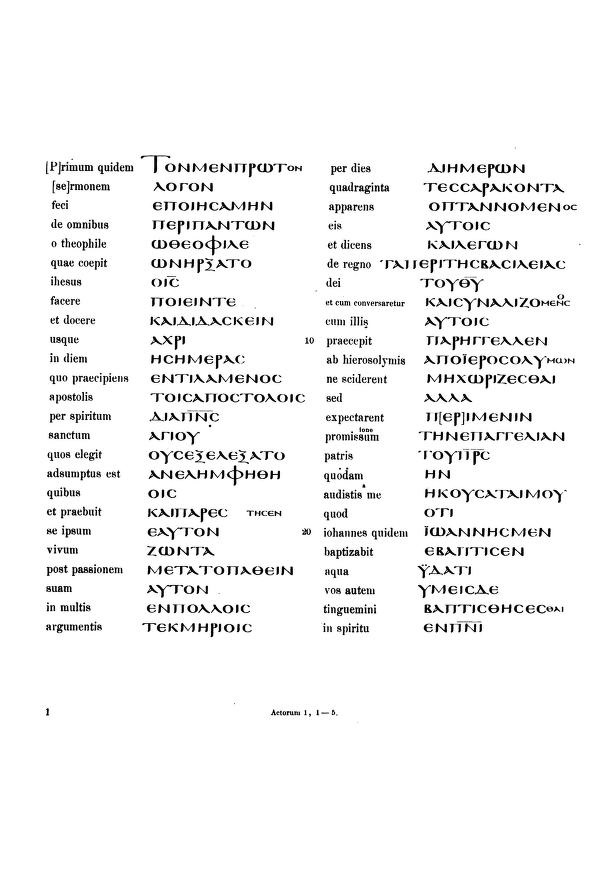
- Tischendorf's facsimile from 1870 of Acts 1:1–5 in Latin (left column) and Greek (right column) in Codex Laudianus, written about AD 550.
- Book: Acts of the Apostles
- Category: Church history
- Christian Bible part: New Testament
- Order in the Christian part: 5

Acts 1 is the first chapter of the Acts of the Apostles in the New Testament of the Christian Bible. Early Christian tradition affirmed that Luke composed this book as well as the Gospel of Luke. (Note: Alexander states: "Since all the evidence on both sides lies within the book itself, it is difficult to resolve the question in advance of reading the text. I have tried to draw attention within the commentary to the passages which have a bearing on this question without prejudging the issue; but on balance I would agree with Fitzmyer and Barrett that it is difficult to find any alternative which makes more sense of all the data than the traditional ascription." See further Fitzmyer (r998: 49-5r) and Barrett (r994-9: i. 30-48) (with full survey of all the ancient evidence); ii. pp. Xlii-xlv) Critical opinion on the tradition was evenly divided at the end of the 20th century. This chapter functions as a transition from the "former account" (that is, the Gospel of Luke) with a narrative prelude (verses 1–5), repeated record of the ascension of Jesus Christ with more detail (verses 6–11) and the meeting of Jesus' followers (verses 12–26), waiting until Pentecost.

== Text ==
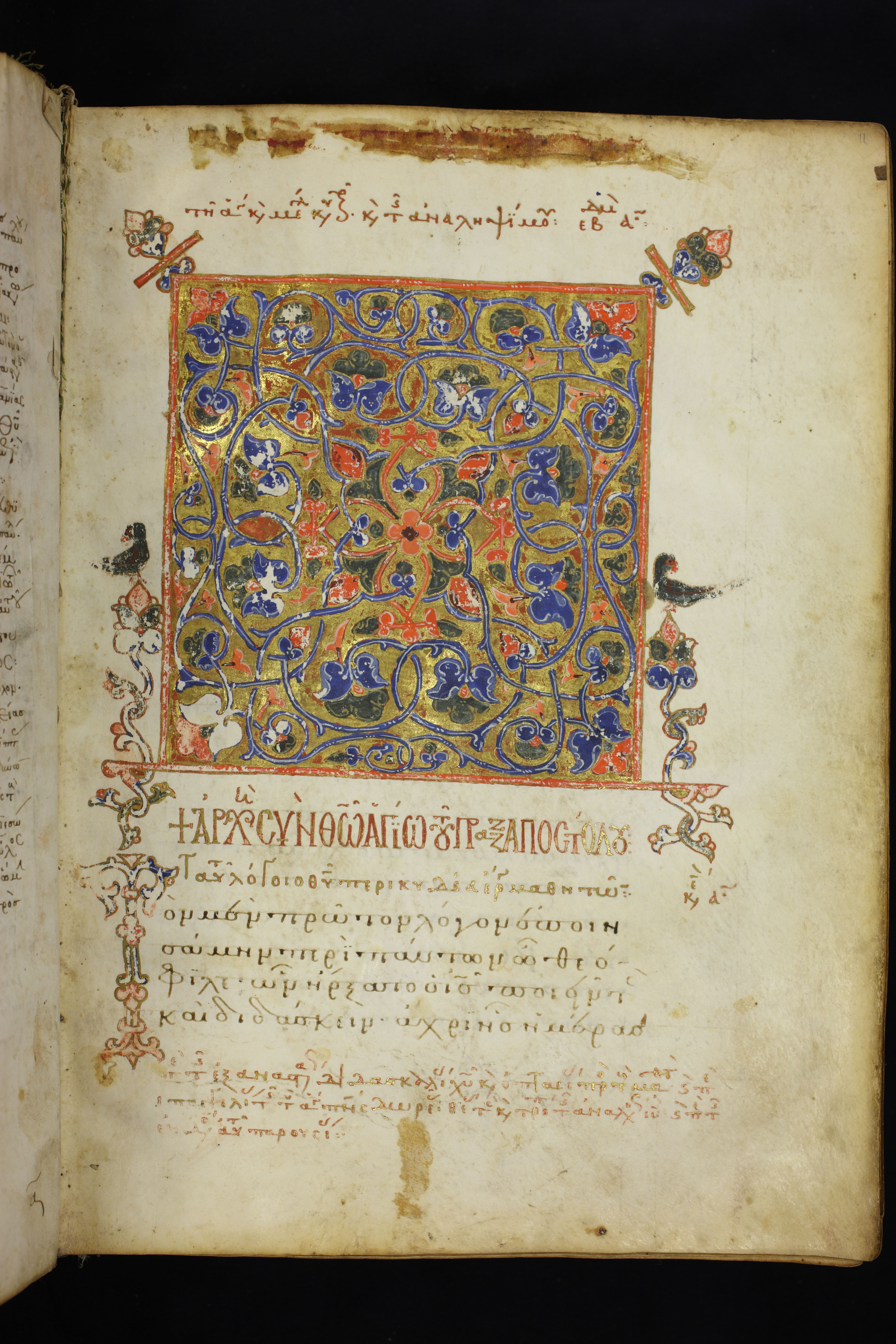
The beginning of the Acts of the Apostles in folio 11 recto of Minuscule 223 (Gregory-Aland) from the 14th century.

The original text was written in Koine Greek. This chapter is divided into 26 verses.

=== Textual witnesses ===
Some early manuscripts containing the text of this chapter are:

- Codex Vaticanus (AD 325–350)
- Codex Sinaiticus (330–360)
- Codex Bezae (~400)
- Codex Alexandrinus (400–440)
- Codex Ephraemi Rescriptus (~450; extant verses 3–26)
- Papyrus 56 (5th/6th century)
- Codex Laudianus (~550)

=== Old Testament references ===
- Acts 1:16: Psalm 41:9
- Acts 1:20: Psalm 69:25; Psalm 109:8

=== New Testament references ===
- Acts 1:1–3: Luke 1:1–4
- Acts 1:4: Luke 24:49
- Acts 1:5: Matthew 3:11
- Acts 1:9: Luke 14:51

== Locations ==
Places mentioned in this chapter

This chapter mentions the following places:

- Bethany
- Jerusalem
- Judea
- Mount of Olives
- Samaria

== Introduction (verses 1–5) ==
The beginning of the book offers a conventional opening statement containing the name of the addressee, Theophilus, and a brief reminder of the content of the "former account" (the Gospel of Luke) by the same author.

=== Verses 1–3 ===
^{1}The former account I made, O Theophilus, of all that Jesus began both to do and teach, ^{2}until the day in which He was taken up, after He through the Holy Spirit had given commandments to the apostles whom He had chosen, ^{3}to whom He also presented Himself alive after His suffering by many infallible proofs, being seen by them during forty days and speaking of the things pertaining to the kingdom of God.

- The "former account" (from Greek: πρῶτον λόγον, próton logon, lit. "first book") refers to the Gospel of Luke.
- "Theophilus" (written in Greek in vocative word form): the intended reader of this book, as well as the previous one (Luke 1:3), might be a "patron" who is already informed about "things which have been fulfilled among us", but still needs "assurance" to "know the certainty of those things" (Luke 1:1-4).
- Luke describes Jesus as "alive after his sufferings", or "alive after his passion". There are later phrases in Acts which show that Jesus was "raised from the dead", e.g. Acts 17:3. William Gilson Humphry referred to "passion" (Greek: το παθειν, to pathein) as a "sacred term" to be used in the translation of this verse, whereas E. H. Plumptre preferred to say "He had suffered", suggesting that the authorised translation, passion, "somewhat anticipate[d] the later special sense" of the word.

=== Verse 4 ===
And being assembled together with them, He commanded them not to depart from Jerusalem, but to wait for the Promise of the Father, "which", He said, "you have heard from Me".

Forty days after his resurrection, Jesus commands the disciples during a meal to stay in Jerusalem and to wait for the coming of the Holy Spirit. The Greek: συναλιζομενος (sunalizomenos) is rendered as "he was eating with them" in the New International Version. Some translations state that they were "assembled" or "gathered" together. Whether "eating" represents the correct interpretation has been long debated.

== Ascension of Jesus (verses 6–12) ==
Then a cloud takes Jesus upward from sight, and two men in white appear to tell them (the disciples) that he will return "in the same way you have seen him go into heaven".

=== Verse 8 ===
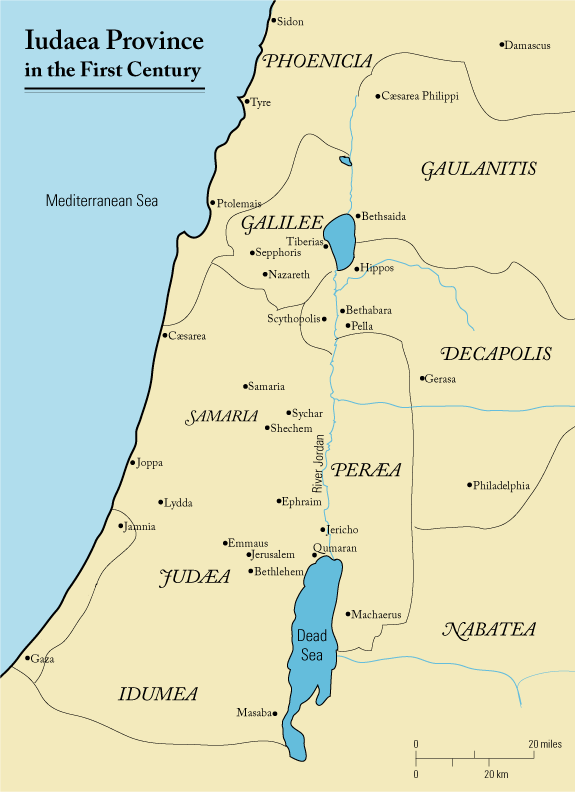
A map of first century Jerusalem, Judea, Samaria and neighboring areas.

[Jesus says:] "But you shall receive power when the Holy Spirit has come upon you; and you shall be witnesses to Me in Jerusalem, and in all Judea and Samaria, and to the end of the earth."

Before Jesus left, he charged the disciples with the task of acting as 'witnesses' to him, in the locations that can be read as a 'geographical program' for the whole book of Acts:

- The first 7 chapters set in Jerusalem
- Chapter 8–11 record the spread of the gospel to the surrounding areas within Syria-Palestine ('Judea and Samaria')
- Chapter 13 onwards following Paul's mission to ever farther places.

Luke chapter 24 (Note: Scholars treated Luke-Acts as a single work from the same anonymous author, which provides the only narrative account of the ascension event.) tells how Jesus leads the eleven disciples "as far as" Bethany, a village on the Mount of Olives, where he instructs them to remain in Jerusalem until the coming of the Holy Spirit: "And it came to pass, while he blessed them, he parted from them, and was carried up into heaven. And they worshiped him, and returned to Jerusalem with great joy" (Luke 24:51–52).

The Gospel of John has three references to ascension in Jesus' own words: "No one has ascended into heaven but he who descended from heaven, the son of man" (John 3:13); "What if you (the disciples) were to see the son of man ascending where he was before?" (John 6:62); and to Mary Magdalene after his resurrection, "Do not hold me, for I not yet ascended to my father..." (John 20:17). Various epistles (Romans 8:34, Ephesians 1:19–20, Colossians 3:1, Philippians 2:9–11, 1 Timothy 3:16, and 1 Peter 3:21–22) also refer to an ascension in relation to the post-resurrection "exaltation" of Jesus to the right hand of God.

The Gospel of Mark also contains a brief ascension account (Mark 16:19), but this is considered by a broad consensus among scholars to be a later addition to the original version of that gospel.

== The apostles in Jerusalem (verses 12–14) ==
=== Verse 12 ===
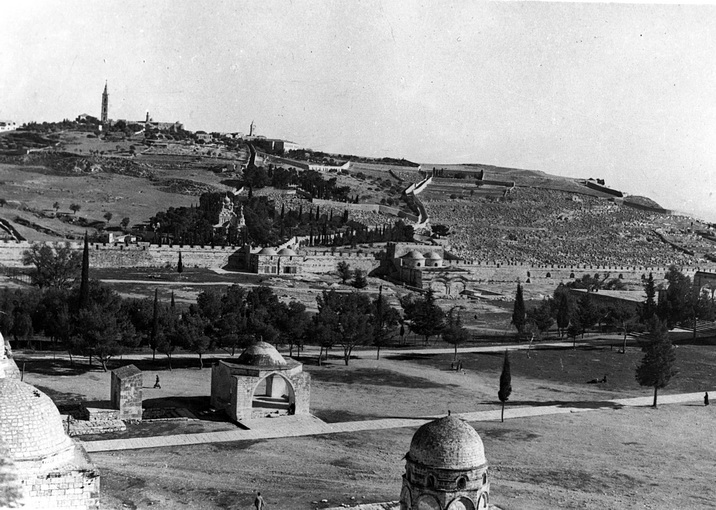
Mount of Olives, seen from Jerusalem (1934)

Then the apostles returned to Jerusalem from the hill called the Mount of Olives, a Sabbath day's walk from the city.

- "The hill called the Mount of Olives" (ESV: "the mount called Olivet"): This geographical site is mentioned by Luke alone in the narrative of Jesus' last entry into Jerusalem (Luke 19:29) and as a place to rest during Jesus' final ministry of teaching (Luke 21:37). Luke 24:50 names Bethany as the site of ascension, which is identified in Luke 19:29 as a location at the Mount of Olives.
- "A Sabbath day's walk" (Greek: Σαββάτου ὁδὸν): 2,000 cubits (= 5 furlongs), about 5/8 mile or about 1 kilometer, showing a proximity to Jerusalem (fulfilling Jesus' command in Luke 24:49), as well as portraying the disciples as faithful Jews (cf. Luke 23:54–56). The distance seems differ significantly with the Bethany in John 11:18, but the ascension site, according to Lightfoot, "was from the place where that tract of the Mount of Olives ceased to be called Bethphage and began to be called Bethany", not inside the village (15 furlongs far in Gospel of John).

As the disciples waited obediently in the upper room (Note: The word ὑπερῷον, hyperōon, for "upper room" used here is different from ἀνάγαιον, anagaion, for the "upper room" where the Last Supper was held in Luke 22:12, but could be the same room.) in Jerusalem for the promised coming of the Holy Spirit, they devoted themselves "with one accord" in prayer (verse 14), underlying the unity of the group which surprisingly now includes Jesus' mother, brothers, and some women.

=== Verse 13 ===
This verse lists the names of the apostles with some differences compared to the apostolic list in Luke 6:14–16 (cf. Matthew 10:1–4; Mark 3:13–19):

- Andrew was moved down from the second place to the fourth place after John
- Thomas was moved up from the eighth place to the sixth place following Philip
- Judas Iscariot is no longer listed.

The omission of Judas Iscariot motivates the narrative of his final fate and Peter's call to find his replacement. The process begins by Peter's appeal to the Scripture (verse 20), and the requirements for the candidate (verses 21–22). With this, Peter reinforces the identity of the group and exerts his de facto authority in the group.

=== Verse 14 ===
These all continued with one accord in prayer and supplication, with the women and Mary the mother of Jesus, and with His brothers.

- "Mary, the mother of Jesus" is mentioned here by name for the first time in Luke-Acts since the infancy narrative in Luke 2.
- "Brothers", or "brothers and sisters", is translated from the plural Greek word adelphoi, which, depending on the context in New Testament usage, may refer either to "brothers" or to "brothers and sisters" (also verse 1:15 in some versions), or may be read as a reference to his cousins.
- Albert Barnes suggests that this continued prayer was the "main business" of the assembled group.

== Election of Matthias (verses 15–26) ==
=== Verse 15 ===
In those days Peter stood up among the disciples (the number of people together was about a hundred and twenty), and said,

- "Stood up" is from the Greek: ἀναστὰς. Adding a participle to a finite verb ("to stand") to indicate the posture or position of a speaker is a characteristic of Luke, as this word is found in Luke's Gospel 17 times, and in Acts 19 times, but only twice in Matthew, and six or seven times in Mark. (Note: Luke also uses σταθείς ("stood") three times in Gospel, six times in Acts, but the other Evangelists do not use it at all.)

=== Verses 21–22 ===
[Peter says:] "^{21}Therefore, of these men who have accompanied us all the time that the Lord Jesus went in and out among us, ^{22}beginning ('arxamenos') from the baptism of John to that day when He was taken up from us, one of these must become a witness ('martyra') with us of His resurrection."

- "Went in and out": is a "Semitism or Septuagintalism" expression (cf. Psalm 121:8), comparable to the English phrase "comings and goings".
- "Beginning" (Greek: ἀρξάμενος, arxamenos): The "baptism" of John" to "that day when He was taken up from us" (ascension) mark the scope for the story of Jesus, with an emphasis on "His resurrection". In Acts 10, Luke notes Peter preaching the gospel using "precisely the same parameters" – also using arxamenos ("began") – with the claim of being a witness (accusative Greek: μάρτυρα, martyra; plural: martyres) specifically to the resurrection (Acts 10:36–42).

[Peter preaches to Cornelius and his household:] "^{36}The word which God sent to the children of Israel, preaching peace through Jesus Christ—He is Lord of all— ^{37}that word you know, which was proclaimed throughout all Judea, and began ('arxamenos') from Galilee after the baptism which John preached: ^{38}how God anointed Jesus of Nazareth with the Holy Spirit and with power, who went about doing good and healing all who were oppressed by the devil, for God was with Him. ^{39}And we are witnesses ('martyres') of all things which He did both in the land of the Jews and in Jerusalem, whom they killed by hanging on a tree. ^{40}Him God raised up on the third day, and showed Him openly, ^{41}not to all the people, but to witnesses chosen before by God, even to us who ate and drank with Him after He arose from the dead. ^{42}And He commanded us to preach to the people, and to testify that it is He who was ordained by God to be Judge of the living and the dead. ^{43}To Him all the prophets witness that, through His name, whoever believes in Him will receive remission of sins."

The apostles proceed by asking God as the only resource to 'indicate' his choice through the casting of lots (verse 26), which is a familiar means of ascertaining divine purpose in both the Graeco-Roman world and the Bible, to get Matthias "numbered with the eleven apostles" (verse 26).

=== Verse 26 ===
And they cast their lots, and the lot fell on Matthias. And he was numbered with the eleven apostles.

- "Matthias": only mentioned in this chapter in the whole Bible, he was chosen by casting lots to be included as "the Twelve" (replacing Judas Iscariot) from then on.

== See also ==
- Ascension of Jesus
- Bethany
- Church of the Ascension, Jerusalem
- Mount of Olives
- Simon Peter
- Jerusalem
- Judas Iscariot
- Theophilus (biblical)
- Related Bible parts: Psalm 69, Psalm 109, Isaiah 49, Matthew 27, Mark 16, Luke 1, Luke 24, Acts 2

== Sources ==
- Alexander, Loveday (2007). "62. Acts". In Barton, John; Muddiman, John (eds.). The Oxford Bible Commentary (first (paperback) ed.). Oxford University Press. pp. 1028–1061. ISBN 978-0-19-927718-6.
- Bauckham, Richard (2017). Jesus and the Eyewitnesses (2nd ed.). Wm. B. Eerdmans Publishing. ISBN 978-0-8028-7431-3.
- Coogan, Michael David (2007). Coogan, Michael David; Brettler, Marc Zvi; Newsom, Carol Ann; Perkins, Pheme (eds.). The New Oxford Annotated Bible with the Apocryphal/Deuterocanonical Books: New Revised Standard Version, Issue 48 (Augmented 3rd ed.). Oxford University Press. ISBN 978-0-19-528881-0.
- Cresswell, Peter (2013). The Invention of Jesus: How the Church Rewrote the New Testament. Duncan Baird Publishers. ISBN 978-1-78028-621-1.
- Holwerda, D.E. (1979). "Ascension". In Bromiley, Geoffrey (ed.). The International Standard Bible Encyclopedia. Eerdmans. ISBN 978-0-8028-3781-3.
- Johnson, Luke Timothy (1992). Harrington, Daniel J. (ed.). The Acts of the Apostles. Collegeville, MN: Liturgical Press. ISBN 978-0-8146-5807-9.
- McDonald, Lee Martin (2004). "Acts". In Combes, Isobel A. H.; Gurtner, Daniel M. (eds.). Bible Knowledge Background Commentary. David C Cook. ISBN 978-0-7814-4006-6.
- Müller, Mogens (2016). "Acts as biblical rewriting of the gospels and Paul's letters". In Müller, Mogens; Nielsen, Jesper Tang (eds.). Luke's Literary Creativity. Bloomsbury. ISBN 978-0-567-66583-6.
- Thompson, Richard P. (2010). "Luke-Acts: The Gospel of Luke and the Acts of the Apostles". In Aune, David E. (ed.). The Blackwell Companion to The New Testament. Wiley–Blackwell. ISBN 978-1-4443-1894-4.
