= Jonathan (High Priest) =

High Priest of Israel (d. AD 58)

- Born: Unknown
- Died: c. AD 58; Jerusalem, Judea, Roman Empire
- Cause of death: Stabbing

Jonathan (Hebrew: יוֹנָתָן; Imperial Aramaic: יוֹנָתָן; died c. AD 58) was a first-century Jewish High Priest in the Second Temple in Jerusalem from 36 to 37 CE.

Jonathan was a member of one of the wealthiest and most influential Jewish families in Iudaea Province during the 1st century: he was the son of Ananus (Hebrew: חנן) and the brother of Eleazar, Theophilus, Matthias and Ananus, all of whom served as High Priests. He was also the brother-in-law of Joseph Caiaphas, the High Priest before whom Jesus of Nazareth appeared.

He was the only member of his family to serve as High Priest twice. In 43 King Agrippa I intended to restore Jonathan as High Priest, but Jonathan refused the honour and instead suggested his brother Matthias, who was then appointed. However, the next year, he took on the post for a few months until Josephus ben Camydus became High Priest.

In AD 58 he was murdered on orders of Antonius Felix, the Roman procurator of Judea. Jonathan had often criticized Felix about governing Jewish affairs, and had threatened to report to Caesar if Felix did not do well. Felix bribed Doras, one of Jonathan's most trusted friends and a citizen of Jerusalem, to hire robbers to murder Jonathan. Doras arranged for some robbers - or sicarii - to mingle with the worshippers in the Temple in Jerusalem with daggers hidden under their garments. These assassins killed Jonathan during a Jewish festival and were never caught.

Jewish titles
Preceded by Joseph Caiaphas	High Priest of Israel; 36-37	Succeeded by Theophilus ben Ananus

Jewish titles
Preceded by Elioneus ben Simon Cantatheras	High Priest of Israel; 44	Succeeded by Josephus ben Camydus
