= Theophilus ben Ananus =

High Priest of Israel 37-41 CE

Theophilus (Hebrew: תפלוס בר חנן) was the High Priest in the Second Temple in Jerusalem from 37 to 41 AD.

Theophilus was a member of one of the wealthiest and most influential Jewish families in Iudaea Province during the 1st century: he was the son of Ananus (Hebrew: חנן) and the brother of Eleazar, Jonathan, Matthias and Ananus, all of whom served as High Priests. He was also the brother-in-law of Joseph Caiaphas, the High Priest before whom Jesus of Nazareth appeared. In addition, his son Matthias served as the next to the last High Priest before the destruction of the Temple by the Romans.

== Possible identification with Luke's Theophilus ==
It has been suggested that he was the Theophilus to whom the Gospel of Luke is addressed, though Theophilus is a common enough name that there are many other possibilities for the addressee of Luke's Gospel and the Acts of the Apostles.

Proponents of this identification argue that the fact that in Luke Theophilus is called by the title Most Excellent (kratiste) indicates that he held a political office like high priest. If anything can be concluded from the absence of that honorific from Acts 1:1, this would suggest that the Gospel of Luke was written during his high priesthood (37-41 AD) while Acts was written after him leaving the office.

== The Johanna Ossuary ==
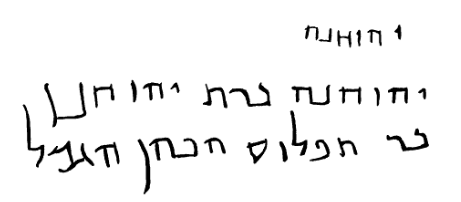
Inscription at Johanna's ossuary.

An ossuary has been discovered bearing the inscription, "Yehoḥanah (Johanna) daughter of Yehoḥanan (John) son of Thefilus (Theophilus) (Note: Thefilus (Imperial Aramaic: תפלוס) is a transliterated form of Ancient Greek: θεοφιλη or Ancient Greek: θεοφιλα. It is a translation of a Hebrew name ידידיה (Yadidiyah), which means friend of Yah.) the High Priest". The details of this ossuary have been published in the Israel Exploration Journal. Therefore, Theophilus had at least one other son, named John, who fathered Johanna.

A woman called Joanna, wife of Chuza, appears twice in the Gospel of Luke. First as a woman accompanying Jesus, after he had healed her (Luke 8:3), and later as one of the women visiting the empty tomb (Luke 24:10). It is unlikely, however, that the Johanna in the Gospel of Luke is the same Johanna as the one mentioned on the ossuary. According to Richard Bauckham, Johanna was "the fifth most popular woman's name in Jewish Palestine", and the Johanna of the Gospel of Luke was likely from Galilee, not from Jerusalem. Furthermore, the High-Priest Theophilus probably turned 30 only after 18 CE, when his brother-in-law was appointed High Priest. It would have been unlikely for a son-in-law to take precedence over a son that had already reached minimum age for that office. If Theophilus was in his thirties at that time, a granddaughter of his could not have been married in the period of the Gospels around 30 CE.

== Notes ==
Jewish titles
Preceded by Jonathan ben Ananus	High Priest of Israel; 37—41	Succeeded by Simon Cantatheras ben Boethus
