= Simon ben Camithus =

1st-century AD High Priest of Israel

- שִׁמְעוֹן בֶּן קִמְחִית

High Priest of Israel
- In office 16 AD – 17 AD
- Preceded by: Eleazar ben Ananus
- Succeeded by: Joseph ben Caiaphas

Religious life
- Religion: Second Temple Judaism

Simon ben Camithus (Hebrew: שִׁמְעוֹן בֶּן קִמְחִית, romanized: Šimʿôn ben qimḥît̲) was a 1st-century High Priest of Israel, who was given the office by the Roman procurator Valerius Gratus and held the office from 17AD to 18AD. Very little is known of him, however he is briefly mentioned in the Talmud as one of the seven sons of Kimchit to serve as high priest, and according to Josephus was succeeded as High Priest by Joseph Caiaphas.

Jewish titles
Preceded by Eleazar ben Ananus	High Priest of Israel; 17AD-18AD	Succeeded by Joseph Caiaphas
