= Jesus ben Ananias =

Prophet before the First Jewish-Roman War

Jesus ben Ananias ("the son of Ananias" [rendered as the "son of Ananus" in the Whiston translation]) was a plebeian farmer, who, according to Flavius Josephus' The Wars of the Jews, four years before the First Jewish-Roman War, begun in 66 AD went around Jerusalem prophesying the city's destruction. The Jewish leaders of Jerusalem turned him over to the Romans, who tortured him. The procurator Lucceius Albinus took him to be a madman and released him. He continued his prophecy for more than seven years until he was killed by a stone from a catapult during the Roman siege of Jerusalem during the war. His name is rendered ישוע בן חנניה (Yeshua ben Hananiah) in modern Hebrew histories.

But a further portent was even more alarming. Four years before the war, when the city was enjoying profound peace and prosperity, there came to the feast at which it is the custom of all Jews to erect tabernacles to God, one Jesus, son of Ananias, a rude peasant, who suddenly began to cry out, "A voice from the east, a voice from the west, a voice from the four winds, a voice against Jerusalem and the sanctuary, a voice against the bridegroom and the bride, a voice against all the people." Day and night he went about all the alleys with this cry on his lips. Some of the leading citizens, incensed at these ill-omened words, arrested the fellow and severely chastised him. But he, without a word on his own behalf or for the private ear of those who smote him, only continued his cries as before. Thereupon, the magistrates, supposing, as was indeed the case, that the man was under some supernatural impulse, brought him before the Roman governor; there, although flayed to the bone with scourges, he neither sued for mercy nor shed a tear, but, merely introducing the most mournful of variations into his utterances, responded to each lashing with "Woe to Jerusalem!" When Albinus, the governor, asked him who and whence he was and why he uttered these cries, he answered him never a word, but unceasingly reiterated his dirge over the city, until Albinus pronounced him a maniac and let him go. During the whole period up to the outbreak of war he neither approached nor was seen talking to any of the citizens, but daily, like a prayer that he had conned, repeated his lament, "Woe to Jerusalem!" He neither cursed any of those who beat him from day to day, nor blessed those who offered him food: to all men that melancholy presage was his one reply. His cries were loudest at the festivals. So for seven years and five months he continued his wail, his voice never flagging nor his strength exhausted, until in the siege, having seen his presage verified, he found his rest. For, while going his round and shouting in piercing tones from the wall, "Woe once more to the city and to the people and to the temple," as he added a last word, "and woe to me also," a stone hurled from the ballista struck and killed him on the spot. So with those ominous words still upon his lips he died. – Book 6, Chapter 5, Section 3 of the historian Flavius Josephus' The Wars of the Jews or History of the Destruction of Jerusalem

== Commentary ==
Irish theologian and bible scholar Adam Clarke noted how similar Jesus Ben Ananias' words hearkened back to Isaiah 66:5: "A voice of noise in the city, a voice from the temple, a voice of the LORD that rendered recompense to his enemies." Tucker S. Ferda argues that the account of Jesus Ben Ananias, amongst other 66-70 AD events in Josephus' work, are being presented through the lens of Jeremiah 7. Biblical scholar Craig A. Evans and Catholic seminary professor Theodore J. Weeden, believed that there are several important parallels between the temple related experiences of Jesus of Nazareth, and the apocalyptic preacher Jesus son of Ananias. The latter of whom warned of the Jerusalem temple's destruction for seven and a half years, as recorded by Josephus.

== See also ==
- Bar-Jesus
- Jesus Barabbas
- Jesus ben Sirach
- Jesus Justus
- Theudas
- Egyptian (prophet)
