= Mattathias ben Theophilus =

1st-century CE high priest of Israel

- מתתיהו בן תאופילוס
- Born: Jerusalem, Judea, Roman Empire
- Died: c. 66 CE; Jerusalem, Judea
- Office: High Priest of Israel
- Term: c. 65 – 66
- Predecessor: Joshua ben Gamla
- Successor: Phannias ben Samuel
- Parent: Theophilus

Mattathias ben Theophilus (Hebrew: מתתיהו בן תאופילוס; died c. 66 CE) was the Jewish High Priest (Kohen Gadol) at the start of the Jewish Revolution, and was overthrown by Revolutionary forces.
