= Caiaphas =

First-century Jewish high priest

Joseph ben Caiaphas
- יוֹסֵף בַּר קַיָּפָא
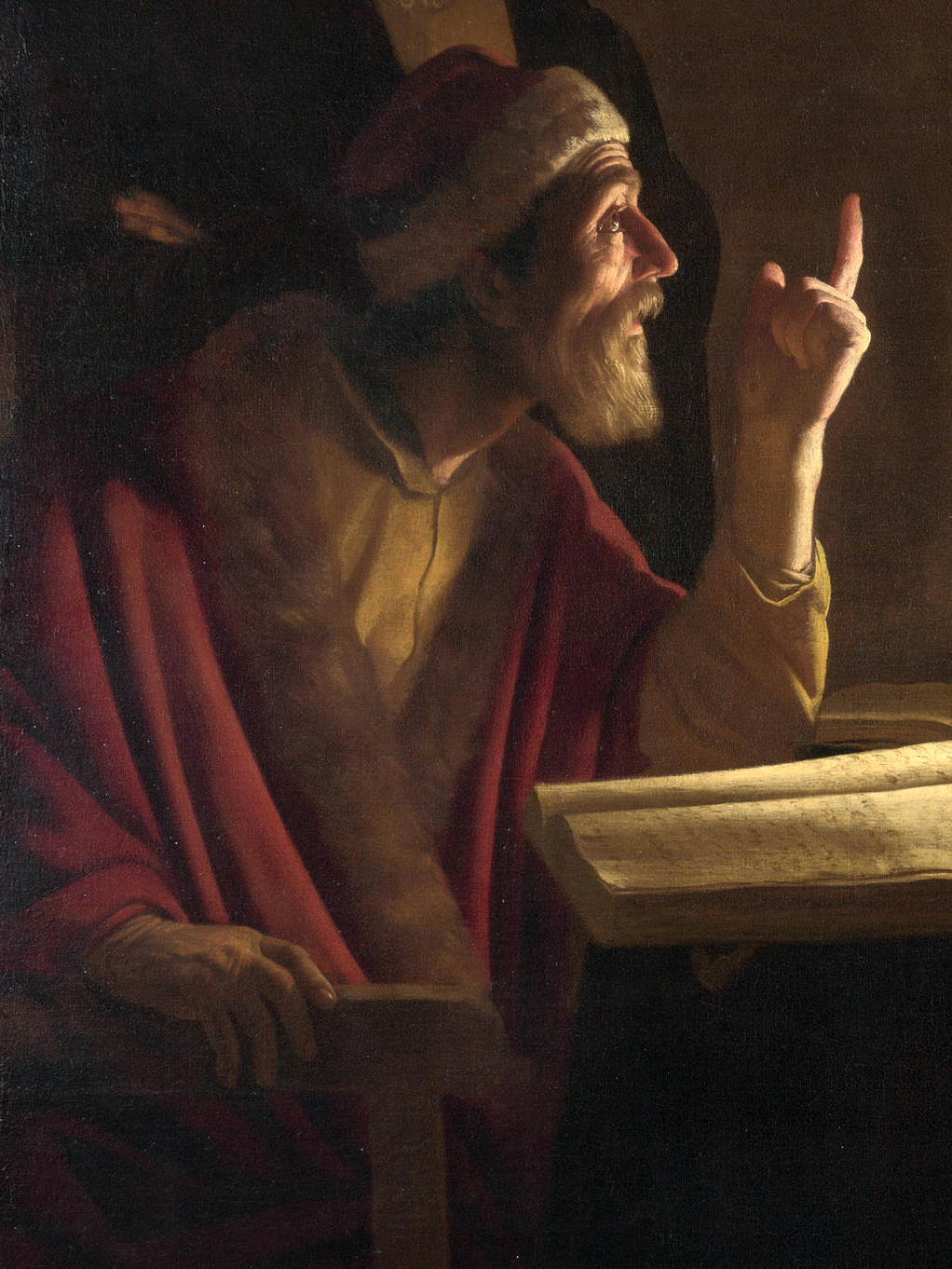
- Detail from Christ Before the High Priest c. 1617

High Priest of Israel
- In office 18 AD – 36 AD
- Preceded by: Simon ben Camithus
- Succeeded by: Theophilus ben Ananus

Personal life
- Region: Judaea
- Known for: Sanhedrin trial of Jesus

Religious life
- Religion: Second Temple Judaism

Joseph ben Caiaphas (Note: Hebrew: יוֹסֵף בַּר קַיָּפָא, romanized: Yōsēf bar Qayyāfā) (/ˈkaɪ.ə.fəs/ (Note: Koine Greek: Καϊάφας, romanized: Kaïáphas, [ka.iˈa.ɸas])) was a High Priest of Israel during the first century. In the New Testament, the Gospels of Matthew, Luke and John indicate he was an organizer of the plot to kill Jesus. He is portrayed as presiding over the Sanhedrin trial of Jesus. The primary sources for Caiaphas' life are the New Testament and the writings of the historian Josephus. The latter recorded that Caiaphas was made high priest by the Roman procurator Valerius Gratus after Simon ben Camithus had been deposed.

== Etymology ==
The Babylonian Talmud (Yevamot 15B) gives the family name as Kuppai, while the Jerusalem Talmud (Yevamot 1:6) mentions Nekifi. The Mishnah, Parah 3:5, refers to the family name as hakKof (perhaps "the Monkey", a play on his name for opposing the Pharisees).

The family name Caiaphas קַיָּפָה has a few possible origins:

- from קוּפָּה 'basket', 'tub', verbalized as קִיֵּף, whence קַיָּף meaning 'basket maker', or a worker utilizing baskets such as to sell spices
- κεφάλαιος: from κεφαλή (kephalḗ, “head”) + -ιος (-ios, adjective suffix) - meaning: main, chief, principal, primary
- "as comely" in Aramaic
- a "dell", or a "depression" in Akkadian.

== Accounts ==
=== New Testament ===
==== John: relations with Romans ====
Annas, father-in-law of Caiaphas (John 18:13), had been high-priest from AD 6 to 15, and continued to exercise a significant influence over Jewish affairs. Annas and Caiaphas may have sympathized with the Sadducees, a religious movement in Judaea that found most of its members among the wealthy Jewish elite. The comparatively long eighteen-year tenure of Caiaphas suggests he had a good working relationship with the Roman authorities.

The New Testament is critical of Caiaphas. In the Gospel of John (John 11), the high priests call a gathering of the Sanhedrin in reaction to the raising of Lazarus. While many scholars believe the repeated name is simply coincidence, some have suggested that the parable in the Gospel of Luke (Luke 16:28–30) may be connected. In the parable, a rich man and the beggar Lazarus have died. The rich man is suffering while Lazarus is with Abraham. The rich man asks Abraham to send Lazarus to warn his brothers. Abraham says that even if Lazarus rises from the dead, the "five brothers" of the rich man will ignore his message. This has given rise to the suggestion by Claude-Joseph Drioux and others that the "rich man" is itself an attack on Caiaphas, his father-in-law, and his five brothers-in-law.

Caiaphas considers, with "the Chief Priests and Pharisees", what to do about Jesus, whose influence was spreading. They worry that if they "let him go on like this, everyone will believe in him, and the Romans will come and destroy both our holy place and our nation."

In the Gospel of John (John 18), Jesus is brought before Annas, whose palace was closer. Annas questioned him regarding his disciples and teaching, and then sent him on to Caiaphas. Caiaphas makes a political calculation, suggesting that it would be better for "one man" (Jesus) to die than for "the whole nation" to be destroyed. Similar ideas can be found in rabbinical discussion in Talmud and Midrash. According to John 11:51-52 it states that "He did not say this of his own accord, but being high priest that year he prophesied that Jesus would die for the nation, and not for the nation only, but also to gather into one the children of God who are scattered abroad."

Afterward, Jesus is taken to Pontius Pilate, the Roman governor of Judea. Pilate tells the priests to judge Jesus themselves, to which they respond they lack authority to do so. Pilate questions Jesus, after which he states, "I find no basis for a charge against him." Pilate then offers the gathered crowd the choice of one prisoner to release—said to be a Passover tradition—and they choose a criminal named Barabbas instead of Jesus.

==== Matthew: trial of Jesus ====
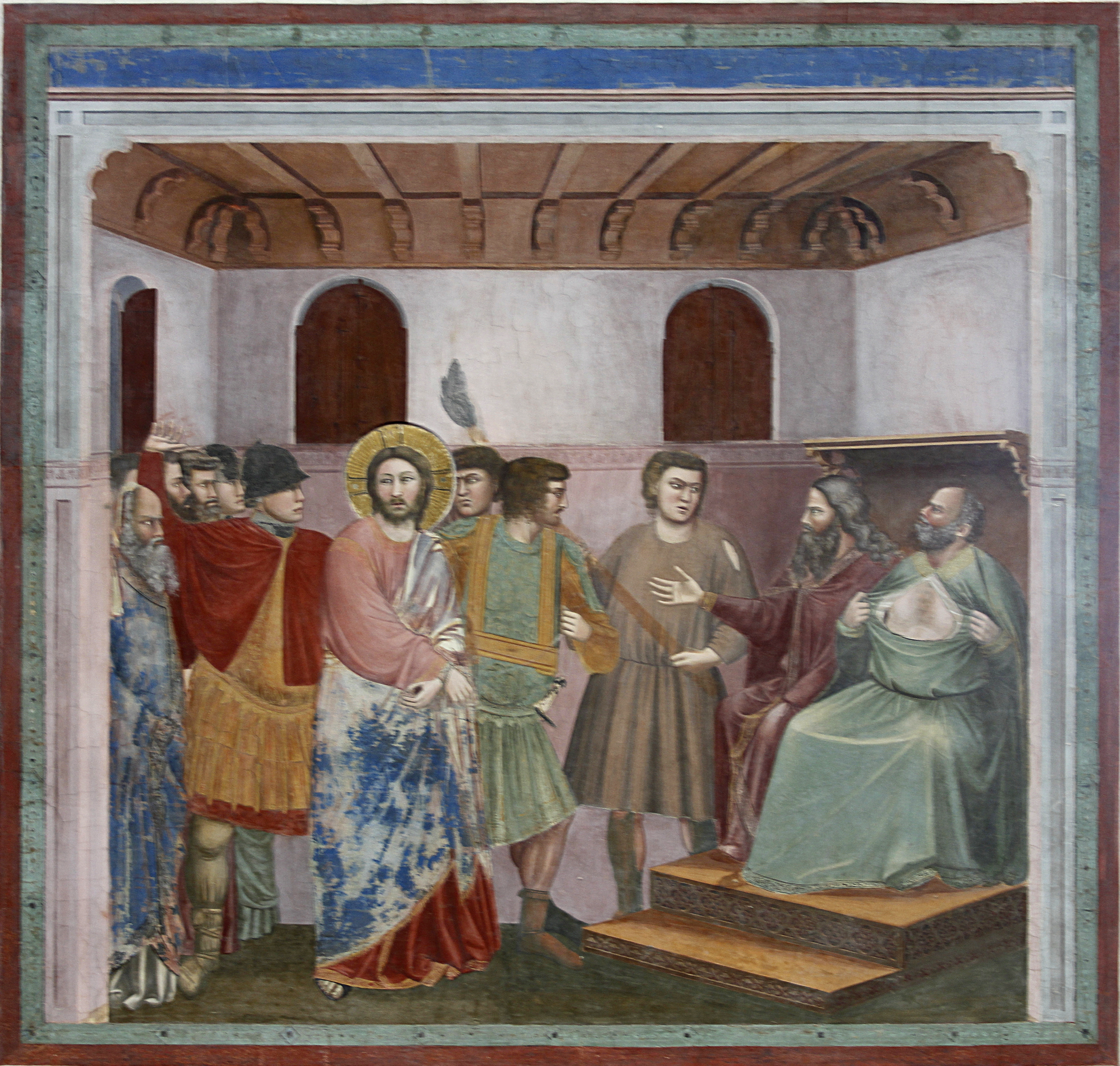
"Christ before Caiaphas". The High Priest is depicted tearing his robe in grief at Jesus' perceived blasphemy.

In the Gospel of Matthew (Matthew 26:56–67), Caiaphas and others of the Sanhedrin are depicted interrogating Jesus. They are looking for evidence with which to convict Jesus, but are unable to find any. Jesus remains silent throughout the proceedings until Caiaphas demands that Jesus say whether he is the Christ (which means Messiah). Jesus replies "The words are your own: and you will see the Son of Man seated at the right hand of power, and coming on the clouds of heaven." (Mark 14:62) Caiaphas and the other men charge him with blasphemy and sentence him to corporal punishment for his crime.

==== Political implications ====
Caiaphas was the son-in-law of Annas by marriage to his daughter and ruled longer than any high priest in New Testament times. For Jewish leaders of the time, there were serious concerns about Roman rule and an insurgent Zealot movement to eject the Romans from Israel. The Romans would not perform executions for violations of Halakha, therefore a charge of blasphemy would not have mattered to Pilate. Caiaphas' position, therefore, was to establish that Jesus was guilty not only of blasphemy, but also of proclaiming himself to be the Messiah, which was understood as the return of the Davidic kingship.

==== Acts: Peter and John refuse to be silenced ====
Later, in Acts 4, Peter and John went before Annas and Caiaphas after having healed a crippled beggar. Caiaphas and Annas questioned the apostles' authority to perform such a miracle. When Peter, full of the Holy Spirit, answered that Jesus of Nazareth was the source of their power, Caiaphas and the other priests realized that the two men had no formal education yet spoke eloquently about the man they called their saviour. Caiaphas sent the apostles away, and agreed with the other priests that the word of the miracle had already been spread too much to attempt to refute, and instead the priests would need to warn the apostles not to spread the name of Jesus. However, when they gave Peter and John this command, the two refused, saying "Judge for yourselves whether it is right in God's sight to obey you rather than God. For we cannot help speaking about what we have seen and heard."

=== Josephus ===
The 1st-century Jewish historian Josephus is considered the most reliable extra-biblical literary source for Caiaphas. His works contain information on the dates for Caiaphas' tenure of the high priesthood, along with reports on other high priests, and also help to establish a coherent description of the responsibilities of the high-priestly office. Josephus (Antiquitates Judaicae 18.33–35) relates that Caiaphas became a high priest during a turbulent period. He also states that the Legate of Syria Lucius Vitellius the Elder deposed Caiaphas (Antiquitates Judaicae 18.95–97). Josephus' account is based on an older source, in which incumbents of the high priesthood were listed chronologically.

According to Josephus, Caiaphas was appointed in AD 18 by the Roman prefect Valerius Gratus who preceded Pontius Pilate.

According to John, Caiaphas was the son-in-law of the high priest Annas, who is widely identified with Ananus the son of Seth, mentioned by Josephus.

=== Rabbinic literature ===
According to Helen Bond, there may be some references to Caiaphas in the rabbinic literature.

== Archaeology ==
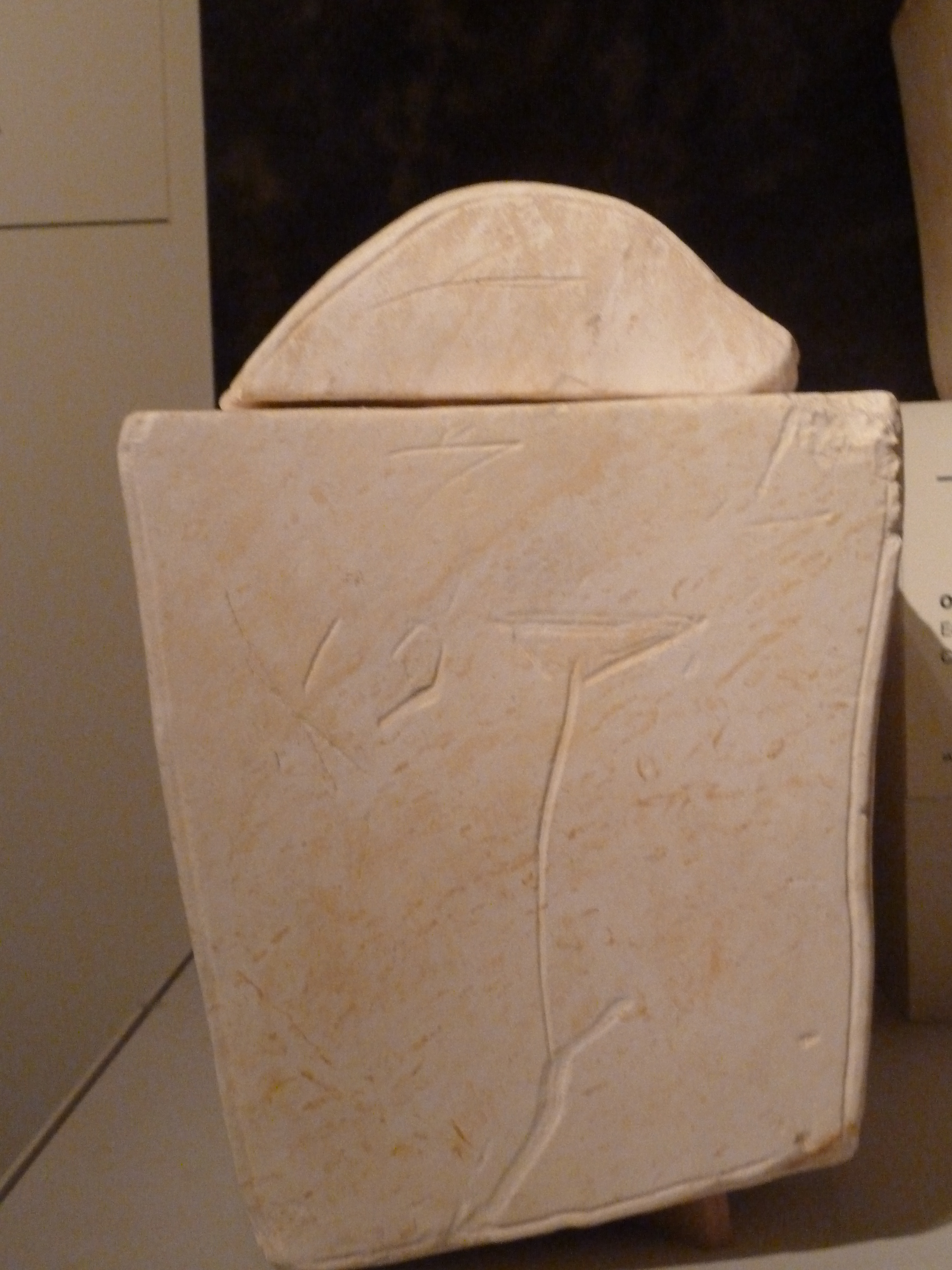
Ossuary with the name קפא carved into its side, found in Jerusalem in 1990

In November 1990, workers found an ornate limestone ossuary while paving a road in the Peace Forest south of the Abu Tor neighborhood of Jerusalem. This ossuary appeared authentic and contained human remains. An Aramaic inscription on the side was thought to read "Joseph son of Caiaphas" and on the basis of this the bones of an elderly man were considered to belong to Caiaphas. Since the original discovery, this identification has been challenged by some scholars on various grounds, including the spelling of the inscription, the lack of any mention of Caiaphas' status as High Priest, the plainness of the tomb (although the ossuary itself is as ornate as might be expected from someone of his rank and family), and other reasons.

In June 2011, archaeologists from Bar-Ilan University and Tel Aviv University announced the recovery of a stolen ossuary, plundered from a tomb in the Valley of Elah. It is inscribed with the text: "Miriam, daughter of Yeshua, son of Caiaphas, Priest of Ma’aziah from Beth ‘Imri". The Israel Antiquities Authority declared it authentic.

== Literature and arts ==
=== Literature ===
In the thirteenth-century French text Estoire del Saint Graal, Caiaphas is responsible for imprisoning Joseph of Arimathea. The Roman emperor Vespasian promises not to slay or burn him for information about Joseph. To punish him, he instead sets him adrift at sea.

In Inferno, Dante Alighieri places Caiaphas in the sixth realm of the eighth circle of Hell, where hypocrites are punished in the afterlife. His punishment is to be eternally crucified across the hypocrites' path, who eternally step on him.

Caiaphas is mentioned throughout the works of William Blake as a byword for a traitor or Pharisee.

Caiaphas is mentioned in the 19th verse of The Ballad of Reading Gaol by Oscar Wilde:

He does not stare upon the air
Through a little roof of glass;
He does not pray with lips of clay
For his agony to pass,
Nor feel upon his shuddering cheek
The kiss of Caiaphas

— Oscar Wilde, The Ballad of Reading Gaol

He is also depicted having an argument with Pontius Pilate regarding the passing of the death sentence against Jesus in The Master and Margarita by Mikhail Bulgakov.

Contrary to the conventional depiction, the short novel The Good Man Jesus and the Scoundrel Christ (2010) by Philip Pullman portrays Caiaphas as a kindly man, heartbroken that Jesus must die for the good of the Jewish nation.

=== Arts ===
Christ before Caiaphas, c.1490, is one of only a handful of works attributed to Antonio della Corna.

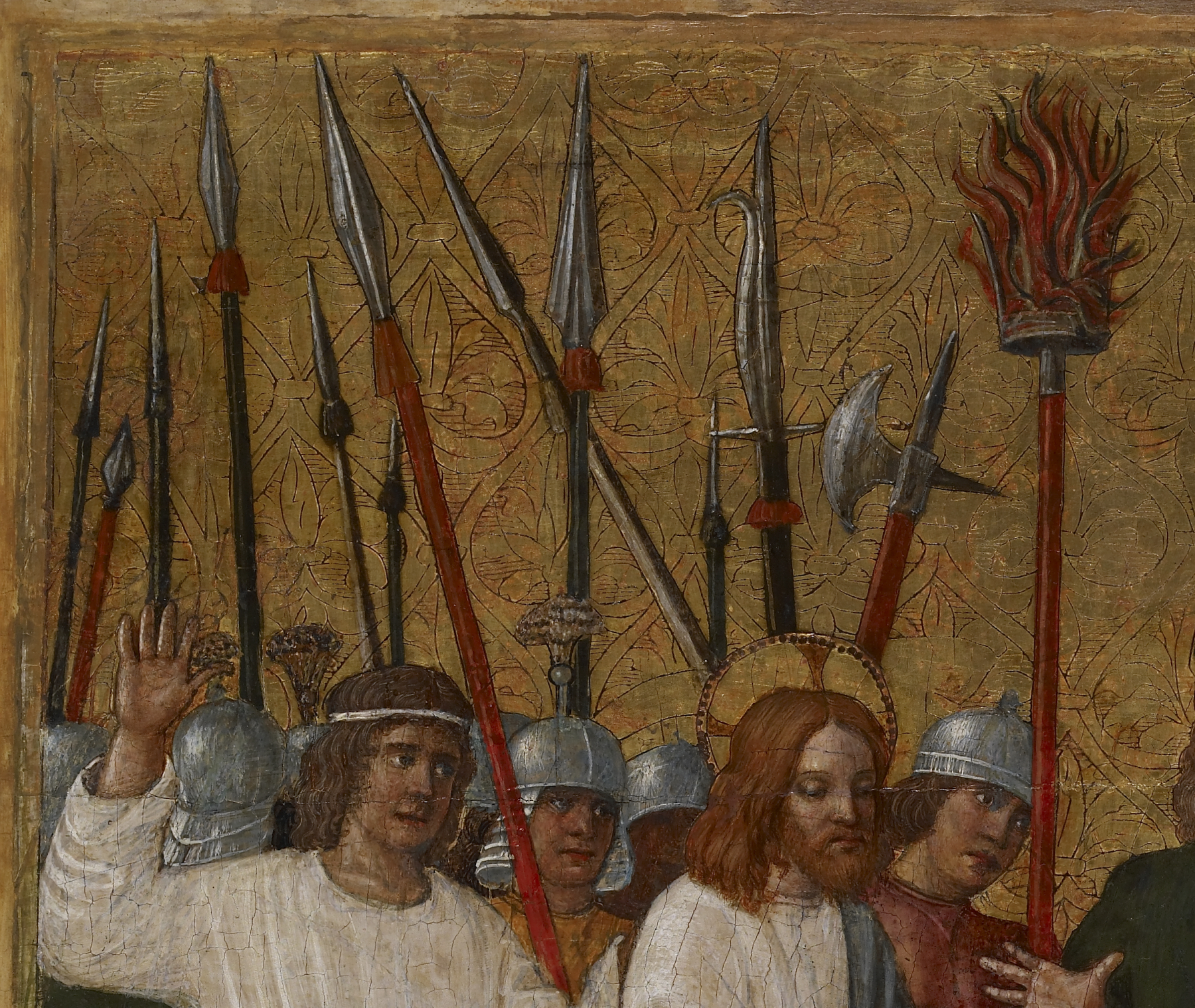
Christ Before Caiaphas, Antonio della Corna. Walters Art Museum.

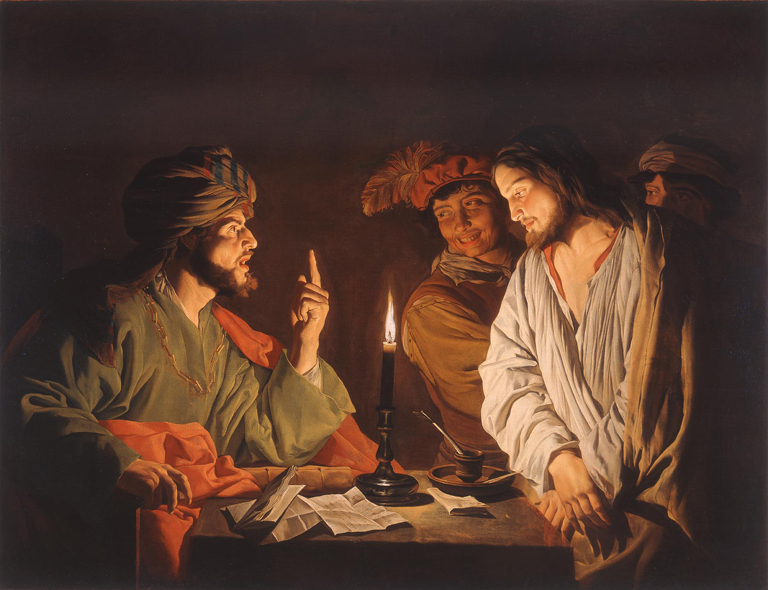
''Christ before Caiaphas'' by Matthias Stom, c. 1630s

=== Film portrayals ===
Actors who have portrayed Caiaphas include:

- Rudolph Schildkraut in Cecil B. DeMille's film King of Kings (1927),
- Guy Rolfe in Nicholas Ray's film King of Kings (1961),
- Rodolfo Wilcock in Pier Paolo Pasolini's film The Gospel According to St. Matthew (1964),
- Martin Landau in George Stevens' film The Greatest Story Ever Told (1965),
- Bob Bingham in Norman Jewison's film Jesus Christ Superstar (1973),
- Anthony Quinn in Franco Zeffirelli's television miniseries Jesus of Nazareth (1977),
- Christian Kohlund in Jesus (1999),
- David Schofield in The Miracle Maker (2000),
- Frederick B. Owens in Jesus Christ Superstar (2000)
- Mattia Sbragia in Mel Gibson's film The Passion of the Christ (2004),
- Valentin Gaft in the TV miniseries The Master and Margarita (2005),
- Bernard Hepton in Son of Man, Adrian Schiller in the TV miniseries The Bible (2013) and the film Son of God (2014), both by same production team,
- Rufus Sewell in Killing Jesus (2015),
- Richard Coyle in A.D. The Bible Continues, an NBC miniseries by Mark Burnett and Roma Downey, and
- Makram Khoury in The Master and Margarita (2024),
- Richard Fancy portrayed Caiaphas starting in Season 4 of The Chosen,
- Ben Kingsley voices him in The King of Kings.

== See also ==
- List of biblical figures identified in extra-biblical sources
- Aristobulus III of Judea - High priest who was the last Hasmonean royal

== Sources ==
- Metzger, Bruce M.; Coogan, Michael D., eds. (1993). The Oxford Companion to the Bible. Oxford, UK: Oxford University Press. ISBN 0-19-504645-5.
- Bond, Helen Catharine (2004). Caiaphas: Friend of Rome and Judge of Jesus?. Louisville: Westminster John Knox. ISBN 0-664-22332-X.
- NETBible: Caiaphas

Jewish titles
| Preceded by Simon ben Camithus | High Priest of Israel; 18–36 | Succeeded by Jonathan ben Ananus |
| Preceded by Shammai | Av Beit Din c. 20–36 | Succeeded by Theophilus ben Ananus |
