= Jesus son of Damneus =

1st century High Priest of Israel

Jesus ben Damneus
- Title: High Priest of Israel

Personal life
- Other names: Joshua ben Damneus, Yehoshua ben Damneus

Religious life
- Religion: Judaism
- Temple: Temple of Jerusalem

Jewish leader
- Based in: Jerusalem
- Predecessor: Ananus ben Ananus
- Successor: Yehoshua ben Gamla

Jesus son of Damneus (Greek: Ἰησοῦς του Δαμναίου, Hebrew: ישוע בן דמנאי, Yeshua` ben Damnai) was a Herodian-era High Priest of Judaea in Jerusalem, Judaea Province. He is mentioned by first-century historian Josephus and is viewed by modern scholarship as clearly distinct from Jesus of Christianity.

== Overview ==
In the Antiquities of the Jews (Book 20, Chapter 9), first-century historian Josephus states that Jesus ben Damneus was made high priest after the previous high priest, Ananus son of Ananus, was removed from his position for executing James the brother of Jesus of Nazareth (James the Just). This occurred after a large number of Jews complained and petitioned the king. Jesus ben Damneus himself was deposed less than a year later. While the authenticity of some passages in Book 18 of Antiquities of the Jews has been subject to debate, some scholars consider the discussion of the death of James in Section 9 of Book 20 to be authentic.

The works of Josephus refer to at least twenty different people with the name Jesus. There is a scholarly consensus that Jesus son of Damneus is distinct from the figure identified as "Jesus called Christ" in Antiquities 20.200, who is mentioned along with the identification of James. Theolgian John Painter states that the phrase "who was called Christ" is used by Josephus in this passage "by way of distinguishing him from others of the same name such as the high priest Jesus son of Damneus, or Jesus son of Gamaliel".

Contrarily, Christ myth theorist Richard Carrier argues that the one "who was called Christ" is actually Jesus son of Damneus, and the title was derived from a marginal comment. Carrier's interpretation has been negatively evaluated by professor of Jewish history Daniel R. Schwartz.

Josephus' reference to James the brother of Jesus

And now Caesar, upon hearing the death of Festus, sent Albinus into Judea, as procurator. But the king deprived Joseph of the high priesthood, and bestowed the succession to that dignity on the son of Ananus, who was also himself called Ananus. Now the report goes that this eldest Ananus proved a most fortunate man; for he had five sons who had all performed the office of a high priest to God, and who had himself enjoyed that dignity a long time formerly, which had never happened to any other of our high priests. But this younger Ananus, who, as we have told you already, took the high priesthood, was a bold man in his temper, and very insolent; he was also of the sect of the Sadducees, who are very rigid in judging offenders, above all the rest of the Jews, as we have already observed; when, therefore, Ananus was of this disposition, he thought he had now a proper opportunity. Festus was now dead, and Albinus was but upon the road; so he assembled the sanhedrin of judges, and brought before them the brother of Jesus, who was called Christ, whose name was James, and some others; and when he had formed an accusation against them as breakers of the law, he delivered them to be stoned: but as for those who seemed the most equitable of the citizens, and such as were the most uneasy at the breach of the laws, they disliked what was done; they also sent to the king, desiring him to send to Ananus that he should act so no more, for that what he had already done was not to be justified; nay, some of them went also to meet Albinus, as he was upon his journey from Alexandria, and informed him that it was not lawful for Ananus to assemble a sanhedrin without his consent. Whereupon Albinus complied with what they said, and wrote in anger to Ananus, and threatened that he would bring him to punishment for what he had done; on which king Agrippa took the high priesthood from him, when he had ruled but three months, and made Jesus, the son of Damneus, high priest.

— Flavius Josephus: Antiquities of the Jews Book 20, Chapter 9, 1 For Greek text see

== See also ==
- Historical Jesus
- Sources for the historicity of Jesus

Jewish titles
Preceded by Ananus ben Ananus	High Priest of Israel; 63	Succeeded by Joshua ben Gamla
