= Lucceius Albinus =

1st-century Roman procurator of Judea, governor and self-declared king of Mauretania

Procurator of Judea
- Reign: 62-64
- Predecessor: Porcius Festus
- Successor: Gessius Florus

Governor of Mauretania Tingitana
- Reign: 64-69
- Predecessor: Gaius Rutilius Secundus
- Successor: Sextus Sentius Caecilianus

King of Mauretania (self declared)
- Reign: 69 (few days/months)
- Predecessor: Ptolemy (as king); Sabalus (as rebel); Roman client republics in Mauretania (actual)
- Successor: none
- Born: unknown
- Died: 69; Mauretania

For others with this cognomen, see Albinus (cognomen).

Lucceius Albinus was the 6th Roman Procurator of Judea from 62 until 64 and the governor of Mauretania Tingitana from 64 until 69. He also apparently declared himself king of Mauretania in 69 as Juba III and tried to revolt against Otho after Galba's demise. However he was betrayed by his own men and assassinated.

== Biography ==
Appointed procurator by the Emperor Nero following the death of his predecessor, Porcius Festus, Albinus faced his first challenge while traveling from Alexandria to his new position in Judea. The Jewish High Priest Ananus ben Ananus used the opportunity created by Festus' death to convene the Sanhedrin and have James the Just (a relative of Jesus Christ) and other people sentenced to death by stoning. A delegation sent by citizens upset over the perceived breach of justice met Albinus before he reached Judea, and Albinus responded with a letter informing Ananus that it was illegal to convene the Sanhedrin without Albinus' permission and threatening to punish the priest. Ananus was therefore deposed by King Herod Agrippa II before Albinus's arrival and replaced with Jesus ben Damneus.

Immediately upon his arrival in Jerusalem, Albinus began an effort to remove the sicarii from the region. Josephus also records that Albinus became the friend of a High Priest named Ananias due to the priest's gift-giving. The sicarii responded to Albinus's efforts by capturing an assistant to the priest Eleazar, son of Ananias, and demanding the release of ten imprisoned sicarii in exchange for the assistant. The release was arranged by Ananias.

At a certain point, a man called Jesus ben Ananias was brought in front of Albinus because he was prophesying the destruction of Jerusalem and of the Second Temple. Albinus interrogated him and had him flogged, but to no avail, since the accused continued to cry his prophecy without answering the procurator's questions; eventually, Albinus declared the man to be a maniac and released him.

When Albinus learned that he was to be succeeded by Gessius Florus, he emptied the prisons by executing prisoners charged with more serious offenses and allowing the remaining prison population to pay for their release.

Following his time in Judea, Albinus was chosen by Nero to be governor of Mauretania Caesariensis. The province of Mauretania Tingitana was added to Albinus's governor duties by the Emperor Galba. Following Galba's death, Albinus supported Otho in the year of political anarchy (69), which followed Nero's death. Following Otho's death, Albinus was rumored to have styled himself as a king using the title "Juba". Albinus and his wife were assassinated shortly afterwards.

== See also ==
- Prefects, Procurators, and Legates of Roman Judaea
- List of Roman governors of Mauretania Tingitana

== Notes ==
Political offices
Preceded by Porcius Festus	Procurator of Judea; 62–64	Succeeded by Gessius Florus
