= Ananus ben Ananus =

1st century High Priest of Israel (d. 68 AD)

- Title: Head of Judean provisional government

Personal life
- Born: Roman Judea
- Died: 68 Jerusalem, Roman Judea
- Other names: Hanan ben Hanan, Ananus ben Artanus

Religious life
- Religion: Judaism
- Temple: Temple in Jerusalem
- Lineage: son of Annas
- Sect: Sadducee

Jewish leader
- Based in: Jerusalem
- Post: High Priest of Israel (until deposed in 63, then "High Priest")
- Predecessor: Joseph Cabi ben Simon
- Successor: Jesus son of Damneus

Ananus ben Ananus (Hebrew: חנן בן חנן, romanized: Ḥānān ben-Ḥānān, Koine Greek: Ἀνάνου Ἄνανος, lit. 'Ananos son of Ananos'; Latin: Anani Ananus or Ananus filius Anani; d. 68 AD) was a High Priest of Israel in Jerusalem in Judaea in the first century. He was the High Priest who ordered the execution by stoning of James, brother of Jesus, according to the Antiquities of the Jews of Josephus. A delegation sent by citizens upset over the perceived breach of justice met Lucceius Albinus before he reached Judea, and Albinus responded with a letter informing Ananus that it was illegal to convene the Sanhedrin without Albinus' permission and threatening to punish him. Ananus was therefore deposed by King Herod Agrippa II before Albinus' arrival and replaced with Jesus son of Damneus.

Ananus was one of the main leaders of the Great Revolt of Judea, which erupted in the year 66. He was appointed as one of the heads of the Judean provisional government together with Joseph ben Gurion in late 66. In 68, Ananus was killed during the inter-rebel civil war in Jerusalem. Josephus in The Jewish War considered Ananus "unique in his love for liberty and an enthusiast for democracy" and as an "effective speaker, whose words carried weight with the people", though in the Antiquities of the Jews he was more critical of his behaviour, calling him "a bold man in his temper, and very insolent".

== Great Priest ==
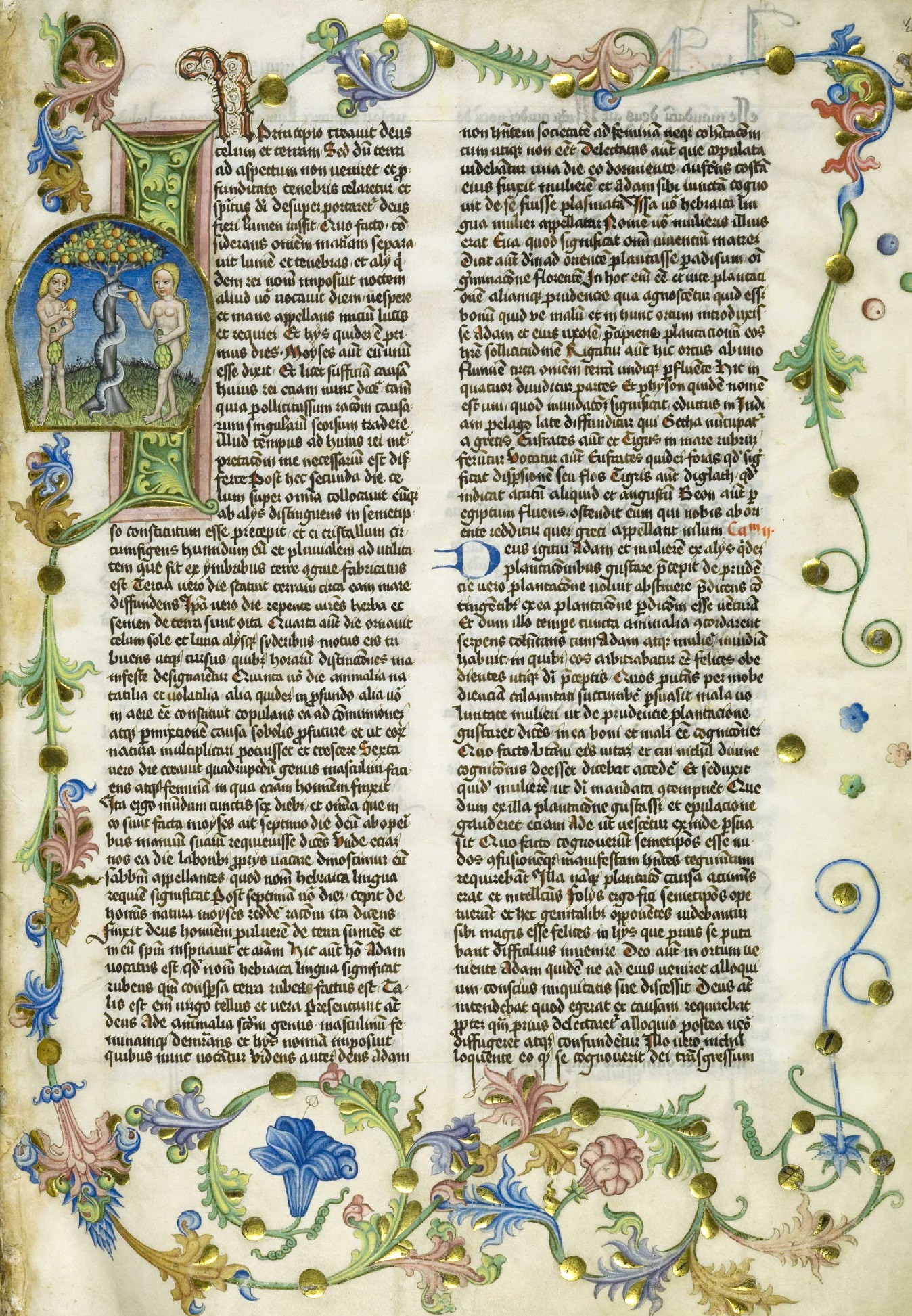
A page from a 1466 copy of Antiquities of the Jews

Josephus's account of the death of James as follows:

Ananus, who, as we have told you already, took the high priesthood, was a bold man in his temper, and very insolent; he was also of the sect of the Sadducees, who are very rigid in judging offenders, above all the rest of the Jews, as we have already observed; when, therefore, Ananus was of this disposition, he thought he had now a proper opportunity [to exercise his authority]. Festus was now dead, and Albinus was but upon the road; so he assembled the Sanhedrin of judges, and brought before them the brother of Jesus, who was called Christ, whose name was James, and some others, [or, some of his companions]; and when he had formed an accusation against them as breakers of the law, he delivered them to be stoned: but as for those who seemed the most equitable of the citizens, and such as were the most uneasy at the breach of the laws, they disliked what was done; they also sent to the king [Agrippa], desiring him to send to Ananus that he should act so no more, for that what he had already done was not to be justified; nay, some of them went also to meet Albinus, as he was upon his journey from Alexandria, and informed him that it was not lawful for Ananus to assemble a Sanhedrin without his consent. Whereupon Albinus complied with what they said, and wrote in anger to Ananus, and threatened that he would bring him to punishment for what he had done; on which king Agrippa took the high priesthood from him, when he had ruled but three months, and made Jesus, the son of Damneus, high priest.

The current scholarly consensus is that this text is authentic. Moreover, in comparison with Hegesippus's account of James's death in his Hypomnemata, scholars consider Josephus's to be the more historically reliable.

== Head of Judean provisional government ==
After Ananus was deposed as high priest, he continued to exercise leadership. "Under the guidance of former high priest Ananus ben Ananus, they (the Sanhedrin) exhorted the populace for support against the radical priestly Zealots, as these 'persuaded those who officiated in the Temple sacrifices to accept no gift or services from a foreigner' (BJ II, 409-414)." Later, he marshaled recruits to fight the Zealots, resulting in the Zealot coup in Jerusalem. While commanding the Jews during the siege, Ananus was killed by the Idumeans or Edomites.

Jewish titles
Preceded by Joseph Cabi ben Simon	High Priest of Israel; 63	Succeeded by Jesus ben Damneus
