= Boethus (family) =

The family of Boethos (or Boethus) produced many High Priests of Israel. They may have been related to the Boethusians.

== Sacredotal family members ==
- Simon son of Boethus from Alexandria, was made a high priest about 23 BCE by Herod the Great, in order that Herod's marriage with Boethus's daughter, Mariamne, might not be regarded as a mésalliance (a marriage with a person thought to be unsuitable or of a lower social position). He thus became the great-grandfather of Salome.

Jewish titles
Preceded by Joshua ben Fabus	High Priest of Israel; 23-25 BCE	Succeeded by Matthias ben Theophilus

- Joazar, son of Simon Boethus, was High Priest twice (4 BCE and before 6 CE). He was unpopular and an advocate of compliance with the Census of Quirinius.

Jewish titles
Preceded by Matthias ben Theophilus	High Priest of Israel; 4 BCE	Succeeded by Eleazar ben Boethus
Preceded by Joshua ben Sie	High Priest of Israel ? - 6 CE	Succeeded by Annas

- Eleazar, son of Simon Boethus (4-3 BCE).

Jewish titles
Preceded by Joazar ben Boethus	High Priest of Israel; 4-3 BCE	Succeeded by Joshua ben Sie

- Simon Cantheras, son of Simon Boethus. (41-42 CE)

Jewish titles
Preceded by Theophilus ben Ananus	High Priest of Israel; 41-43 CE	Succeeded by Matthias ben Ananus

- Elioneus, son of Simon Cantheras.

Jewish titles
Preceded by Matthias ben Ananus	High Priest of Israel; 43-44 CE	Succeeded by Jonathan ben Ananus

- Joshua ben Gamla (64 CE), whose wife Martha, daughter of Simon Boethus, belonged to the house.

== Public opinion ==
The hatred of the Pharisees toward this high-priestly family is shown by the words of the tanna Abba Saul ben Batnit, who lived about the year 40 CE at Jerusalem. "The house of Boethus" heads the list of the wicked and sinful priestly families enumerated by Abba.
