= Abba Jose ben Hanan =

Judean rabbi of the 2n century

Abba Jose ben Hanan or Abba Jose ben Hanin (Hebrew; Aramaic: Abba bar Hanan) was a tanna who lived in Judea. His name occurs also as "Abba Jose ben Hanan," or "ben Johanan" (which is erroneously followed by "ish Yerushalayim"), "Abba Joseph," and "Abba Issi."

He appears to have engaged in a halachic discussion with Eliezer ben Jacob and of Hanina ben Antigonus on the subject of Temple practices, which would suggest he lived in the late 1st or early 2nd centuries CE. However, he also transmitted an aggadah of Abba Kohen Bardela who lived around the year 200 CE, which would place Jose at the same time or later. On this basis, scholar Aharon Heimann concluded that there were two scholars by this name, living at different times.

== Teachings ==
Jose's halakhot are also mentioned in Sifre, Numbers 8; Middot 2:6; and Sotah 20b. He transmitted an aggadah by Shmuel haKatan. A teaching of Jose's, rebuking the priestly families that acted violently toward the people, transmitted by Abba Saul ben Batnit, reads as follows: "Woe unto me for the house of Boethus and their rods; woe unto me for the house of Hanin and their calumnious whispering; woe unto me for the house of Qatros and their pens; woe unto me for the house of Ishmael ben Phabi and their fists."

In Yebamot 53b, an "Abba Jose b. Johanan" ("b. Hanan" in Rashi) is mentioned as having transmitted a halakhah of Rabbi Meir, who lived a century later. Bacher therefore supposes that the author of the teaching quoted above was Abba Shaul ben Botnit, and that it was transmitted by the Abba Jose of Yebamot.
