= Cohler =

Cohler is a surname. Notable people with the surname include:

- Bertram Cohler (1938–2012), American psychologist, psychoanalyst, and educator
- Dianne Cohler-Esses, first Syrian woman rabbi
- Gary Cohler, American bridge player
- Jonathan Cohler (born 1959), American clarinetist
- Larry Cohler-Esses, American journalist and political writer, husband of Dianne Cohler-Esses
- Matt Cohler (born 1977), American venture capitalist
