= Shtetl (publication) =

News outlet covering Haredi Jewish topics

Shtetl: Haredi Free Press was a media outlet founded by activist Naftuli Moster in 2023 to cover the Haredi Jewish community. Moster renounced the site in 2025, leading to the resignation of its board.

== History ==
Naftuli Moster, founder and former executive director of activist group Young Advocates for Fair Education (Yaffed), announced in November 2022 the upcoming launch of online media outlet Shtetl: Haredi Free Press in early 2023. Moster stated that the outlet would produce independent journalism to fill a news desert in the Haredi media landscape. Shtetl launched in November 2023.

In June 2025, Moster announced that he regretted both Shtetl and Yaffed after growing distrustful of progressive politics after the October 7 attacks and due to his concern that his advocacy had negatively impacted family in the Haredi community. In response, all three of Shtetl's board members resigned.

== Staffing ==
The board included Jewish journalists, including Larry Cohler-Esses of The Forward and Ari Goldman of Columbia University, and Adelle Goldenberg. Moster was the founding editor-in-chief and the website launched with one staff reporter, a non-Haredi.

== Editorial and reception ==
Some reaction was praise for a news outlet that could hold communal institutions to account. According to activist Elad Nehorai, most Haredi outlets were more akin to community newspapers than journalistic enterprises. Shtetl aimed to cover stories about the Haredi community with cultural and linguistic context other news outlets were not suited for. Critics argued that Shtetl had a political agenda to undermine the community, including Avi Shafran of Agudath Israel of America, who claimed that Shtetl would be focused only on the negatives of the community. NPR contrasted Shtetl's "warts and all" goals with Hamodia.
