= Megillat Taanit =

Ancient Jewish Text

Megillat Taanit (Hebrew: מגילת תענית, romanized: məḡillaṯ taʿaniṯ), lit. "the Scroll of Fasting," is an ancient text, in the form of a chronicle, which enumerates 35 eventful days on which Jews either performed glorious deeds or witnessed joyful events. Despite the scroll's name, these were celebrated as feast days. Public mourning was forbidden on fourteen of them and public fasting on all.

The work was probably written late in the Second Temple period, perhaps from 40–70 CE in the 1st century. The last event dated without dispute is Emperor Caligula's order to place a statue of himself in the Second Temple (c. 39 CE). A few scholars think it references events after the destruction of the Temple in 70 CE. References to it in other literature suggest it certainly existed by the 2nd century. The author is unknown, although various rabbinic works speculate on how it was composed.

== History of the feast days ==
The events described therein date to several periods: the pre-Hasmonean period, the Hasmonean period, the early Roman period, and the period of the First Jewish–Roman War, with the majority of the entries relating to the Hasmonean period. Almost half of theses events cannot be conclusively identified. Nearly all commemorate victories in battle, especially those events centered around the Hasmonean period.

The days are enumerated, not in the chronological order of the events they commemorate, but in the sequence of the calendar. Megillat Taanit contains twelve chapters, each chapter contains the memorial days of a single month, beginning with Nisan (the first calendar month), and ending with Adar.

While J. Schmilg argued that these memorial days become festivals by being incorporated and recorded in Megillat Taanit, later scholarship has concluded that the days had been known and celebrated by the people long before that time (as Schmilg himself was forced to admit in the case of some of them). The celebration of these festivals or semi-festivals existed as early as the time of the Book of Judith. The compilers of Megillat Taanit merely listed the memorial days and, at the same time, determined that a mere suspension of fasting should celebrate the less important, while public mourning was to be forbidden on the more important ones.

== Structure ==
In most editions, Megillat Taanit consists of two parts, which are distinct in language and in form, namely:

- The text or Megillat Taanit proper, written in Jewish Palestinian Aramaic and containing merely brief outlines in a concise style. It dates to the Tannaitic period.
- The scholium or commentary on the text, written in Hebrew. This was written much later - in the seventh century or later, as shown by its author having before him the text of both the Talmuds as well as that of Bereshit Rabbah.

The many quotations from Megillat Taanit in the Talmud are all taken from the Aramaic text and are introduced by the word "ketib" = "it is written". This text, which had been committed to writing and was generally known, was explained and interpreted in the same way as the Bible. The Talmud does not include a single quotation from the scholium. Although the comments in the scholium are mentioned in the Talmud, they are not credited to Megillat Taanit. They are quoted as independent baraitot, so the scholium took them from the Talmud, not vice versa. Schmilg provides references intended to prove an earlier origin for the scholium; However, these sources merely prove that the scholiast intended to make his work pass for a product of the tannaitic period.

As the text and the scholium of Megillat Taanit are distinct in form and language, they also differ in historical accuracy. The text is an actual historical source whose statements may be regarded as authentic, while its dates are reliable if interpreted independently of the scholium. On the other hand, the scholium is of very doubtful historical value and must be used with extreme caution. Although it contains some reliable baraitot, the compiler has mixed them with other ahistorical accounts and legends so that even those data whose legendary character has not been proved can be credited only when confirmed by internal and external evidence.

In some editions, a third section appears: the "final discourse" (Hebrew ma'amar aharon), which lists days on which one should fast (in contrast to the rest of Megillat Taanit, which lists days on which fasting is forbidden). This section dates to the period of the Geonim.

== Authorship of the Aramaic text ==
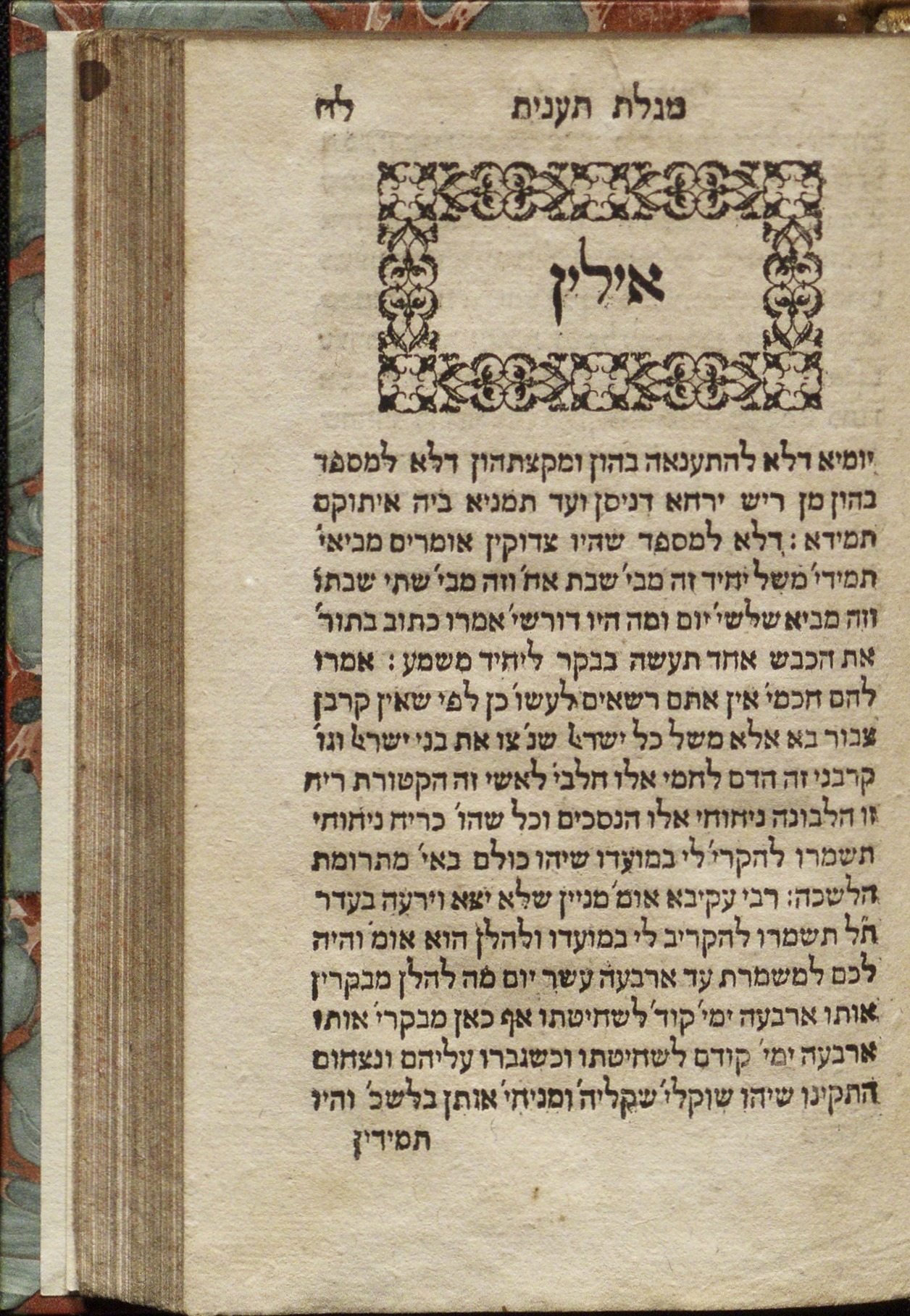
Opening page of Megilat Taanit

The Talmud and the scholium to Megillat Taanit itself provide slightly different accounts of the authorship of Megillat Taanit:

- According to a baraita in the Talmud, "Hananiah ben Hezekiah of the Garon family, together with a number of others who had assembled for a synod at his house, compiled Megillat Ta'anit." According to Halakhot Gedolot, "Hilkot Soferim", the members of this synod were elders of the Houses of Hillel and Shammai. Megillat Taanit must have been composed, therefore, about the year 7 CE, when Judea was made a Roman province, to the great indignation of the Jews. This calendar of victories was intended to fan the spark of liberty among the people and to fill them with confidence and courage by reminding them of the victories of the Maccabees and the divine aid granted to the Jewish nation against the heathen.
- The scholium to Megillat Taanit says: "Eleazar ben Hanania of the family of Garon together with his followers compiled Megillat Taanit." This Eleazar took a noteworthy part in the beginning of the revolt against the Romans, vanquishing the garrison at Jerusalem, as well as Herod Agrippa II's troops, and Menahem's Sicarii. According to this account, therefore, Megillat Taanit was composed by the Zealots after the year 66 CE, during the revolution.

Modern scholarship rejects Schmilg's view that the scholium is incorrect since there is both internal and external evidence in favor of its authenticity.

The account in the Talmud and that in the scholium may both be accepted since not only Hananiah, the father but also Eleazar, the son, contributed to the compilation of the work. Eleazar, one of the central figures in the war against the Romans, endeavored to strengthen the national consciousness of his people by continuing his father's work and increased the number of memorial days in the collection to remind the people how God had always helped them and had given them the victory over external and internal enemies.

=== Interpolations ===
Eleazar did not, however, complete the work. Several days were subsequently added to the list, which was definitively closed in Usha, as is proved by the fact that the 12th of Adar is designated as "Trajan's Day," and the 29th of that month as "the day on which the persecutions of Hadrian ceased". Furthermore, Simeon ben Gamaliel II, who was nasi at Usha, says that "If we should turn all the days on which we have been saved from some danger into holidays, and list them in Megillat Ta'anit, we could not satisfy ourselves; for we should be obliged to turn nearly every day into a festival." This indicates that the work was completed at Usha at the time of Simeon ben Gamaliel, so no further memorial days might be added.

== The scholion ==
The scholion is written in Mishnaic Hebrew combined with some more ancient terminology; there are also some influences from later Babylonian Aramaic. Some stories in the scholion are ancient and reliable, mentioning historical facts nowhere else in Tannaic literature, while others are midrashim taken from various sources.

Vered Noam has shown that the scholion currently printed is a medieval hybrid of two independently written commentaries, nicknamed "Scholion O" and "Scholion P", after the Oxford and Parma manuscripts in which they are found. Often these two commentaries contradict each other, offering entirely different stories for the origin of a holiday. In general, Scholion O has more overlap with Genesis Rabbah, the Talmud Yerushalmi, and other sources from Israel, while Scholion P is closer to Babylonian sources. The current Scholion, nicknamed the "Hybrid Version," was created in the 9th or 10th centuries by combining Scholia O and P.

Scholia O and P may be just two examples of a genre of commentaries on Megillat Taanit, with a partial scholion in the Babylonian Talmud being a third example, and the other examples not surviving.

== Editions and commentaries ==
Megillat Taanit is extant in many editions and has had numerous commentaries. The best edition of the Aramaic and Hebrew text is that of Vered Noam, which has supplanted A. Neubauer's as the authoritative work in the field. In addition to meticulous philological scholarship, Noam's edition includes rich annotation and a groundbreaking interpretation of stemmatic history.

Of commentaries the following may be mentioned: Abraham ben Joseph ha-Levi, double commentary (Amsterdam, 1656); Judah ben Menahem, double commentary (Dyhernfurth, 1810); Johann Meyer, Latin language translation published in his Tractatus de Temporibus, etc. (Amsterdam, 1724). Derenbourg and Schwab have made French versions of the Aramaic text.

== Selected entries ==
Among the dates penned in Megillat Taanit and which were all forbidden to fast thereon, and for others also forbidden to lament the dead thereon, are to be noted the following:

- "And from the eighth day thereof (i.e. the lunar month of Nisan) until the end of the [last] festival day [of Passover], the Feast of Weeks (Shavu'ot) was restored, [being days on which] it is prohibited to mourn" [Original Aramaic: ומתמניא ביה ועד סוף מועדא איתותב חגא דשבועייא די לא למספד]

[Excursus: This episode has been explained by Rashi in Babylonian Talmud (Taanit 17b, s.v. מתמניא ביה) to mean the vindication of the Pharisees over the Boethusians in the days of Rabbi Yohanan ben Zakkai, when the Boethusians held the errant view that the people of Israel are to only begin counting the seven weeks, or 49 days of the Counting of the Omer, after the first Sabbath that follows the first Festival Day of Passover, which method would invariably cause a delay in the counting, and push back further the Feast of Weeks (Shavu'ot) which falls on the 50th day. According to the Pharisees, on the other hand, whose opinion is Halacha, the Counting of the Omer begins immediately following the first Festival Day of Passover, which happens to be the Sabbath day of rest spoken of in Leviticus 23:15, that is to say, Passover itself, and they begin the counting on the following day, on the 16th day of the lunar month Nisan, in which case the festival day known as the Feast of Weeks will always fall on the 6th day of the lunar month Sivan. When Rabbi Yohanan ben Zakkai prevailed over the Boethusians at this time, the days were commemorated as a semi-holiday; Shavu'ot being restored to its former time of observance.]

- "On the twenty-third day of the same (i.e. the lunar month of Iyar), the inhabitants of the Citadel (Acra) departed from Jerusalem" [Original Aramaic: בעשרים ותלתא ביה נפקו בני חקרא מירושלים]

[Excursus: The appended date recollects an event that happened in the second year of the high priesthood of Simon Thassi, son of Mattathias, in the year 171 of the Seleucid era (141/140 BCE), in which the Jewish nation, by order of King Demetrius the son of Demetrius from Crete, evicted from the residential area of Jerusalem, known as the "Citadel" or Acra, those who had taken-up residence in that part of the city and who had been allied with the enemies of Israel, and who had long waged a cultural war with the Jewish nation, killing them, and rejecting Jewish mores and manners. After these had been evicted, among whom were Jewish apostates, the residential area known as the "Citadel" was resettled by Torah-abiding citizens. The event is mentioned in the First Book of Maccabees (13:49–52): "... And they entered into it on the three and twentieth day of the second month, in the year 171 [Seleucid era] with thanksgiving, and branches of palm trees, and harps, and cymbals, and psalteries, and hymns, and canticles, because the great enemy was destroyed out of Israel."]

- "On the seventeenth day of [the lunar month] Sivan, [they took] possession of Migdal Ṣur" [Original Aramaic: בשבעה עשר בסיון אחידת מגדל צור]

[Excursus: The event is alluded to in the Babylonian Talmud (Megillah 6a), as well as detailed by Josephus (Antiquities 13.12.4; 13.15.4.), referring to the time when the nation of Israel captured Straton's Tower (Caesarea), "the daughter of Edom, which is situated among the sand-dunes," and which city along with Dor had, formerly, been under foreign rule and had been compared to a "peg driven into Israel," until the day that Alexander Jannaeus with the assistance of Ptolemy, captured her king, Zoilus, and drove out the inhabitants of the coastal town while settling Jews within the city. Dor is mentioned in the 3rd-century Mosaic of Rehob as being a place exempt from tithes, seeing that it was not settled by Jews returning from the Babylonian exile in the 6th century BCE. Straton's Tower (Caesarea) seems to have had the same status, as Rabbi Judah the Prince exempted fruits and vegetables that were grown in Caesarea from being tithed (Jerusalem Talmud, Demai 2:1), since the nation of Israel had not initially settled in that part of the country during the exiles' return, until the days of Alexander Jannaeus. Schürer suggests that Dor, along with Caesarea, may have initially been built towards the end of the Persian period.]

- "On the fifteenth day thereof and on the sixteenth day thereof (i.e. the lunar month] Sivan), the inhabitants of Beth-shean (Scythopolis) and the inhabitants of the valley [of Jezreel] were deported" [Original Aramaic: בחמשה עשר ביה ובשיתא עשר ביה גלו אנשי בית שאן ואנשי בקעתה]

[Excursus: The event is alluded to in the Midrash Rabba (Canticles Rabba 8:7 [11], and where Antioch is to be read as Antiochus), in the Jerusalem Talmud (Soṭah 9:13 [45b]), in the Babylonian Talmud (Soṭah 33a), in Josephus (Antiquities 13.10.2–3.), as well as in Ishtori Haparchi's Kaftor ve-ferach (vol. 1, ch. 7), as referring to the sons of the high priest John Hyrcanus who waged war against the inhabitants of those places and against their protector Antiochus Cyzicenus and who eventually took from them their cities and expelled them. After laying siege to Scythopolis for one year, the city was taken and demolished. On the very same day on which John Hyrcanus's sons fought with Antiochus Cyzicenus, John Hyrcanus had gone into the Temple to offer incense, when he heard a divine voice discourse with him that his sons had just then overcome Antiochus.]

- "On the twenty-fifth day of the same (i.e. the lunar month of Sivan), the farmers of public revenues were removed from Judea and from Jerusalem" [Original Aramaic: בכ"ה ביה איתנטלו דימסנאי מיהודא ומירושלים]

[Excursus: The date transcribed here is alluded to in Babylonian Talmud (Sanhedrin 91a), where the lunar month of this event is said there to have happened in Nisan instead of Sivan. In any rate, the event refers to the days of Alexander the Great who, when he passed through the Levant, was greeted by Jews, Canaanites (Phoenicians), Ismaelites and Egyptians, the latter three of these groups demanding of Alexander to adjudicate in cases involving themselves and the nation of Israel, from whom they had traditionally collected the public tax. When Alexander heard their arguments and saw that they had no real basis of merit, he released the nation of Israel from having to pay monies (taxes) to these public officials.]

- "On the fourteenth day of [the lunar month of] Tammuz, the book of decrees had been taken away, [a day on which] it is prohibited to mourn" [Original Aramaic: בארבעה עשר בתמוז עדא ספר גזרתא דלא למספד]

[Excursus: On the 14th day of the lunar month Tammuz, a book of decrees relayed by the Sadducees and the Boethusians had been taken away, who would, in all cases, show proof from a written text concerning the four modes of capital punishment, rather than from an orally transmitted tradition and which tradition had previously prevailed and been received by the people, as evinced by the Pharisees. Some have explained here that the Sadducees had formerly possessed a book of decrees outlining which punishments are to be inflicted for the various offences and which thing was not permitted to have transcribed in writing, since the matter was wholly committed to oral tradition. The vindication of the Pharisees over the Sadducees and Boethusians gave rise to this date being held in honor, until the Scroll of Fasting was cancelled altogether.]

- "On the twenty-fourth day thereof (i.e. the lunar month of Av) we returned to our former judgment" [Original Aramaic: בעשרים וארבעה ביה תבנא לדיננא]

[Excursus: This date is explained by Rashi in the Babylonian Talmud (Baba Bathra 115b–116a), although with the variant lunar month of Tevet, as well as alluded to in the Jerusalem Talmud (Baba Bathra 8:1 [21b–22a), and revolves around the Jewish laws of inheritance, where the property of a deceased man is inherited by his sons, but if the man had only daughters, his property is inherited by his daughters upon his death (Numbers 27:8). The Sadducees, however, in defiance of Jewish tradition, whenever dividing the inheritance among the relatives of the deceased, such as when the deceased left no issue, would perfunctorily seek for familial ties, regardless and irrespective of gender, so that the near of kin to the deceased and who inherits his property could, hypothetically, be his paternal aunt. The Sadducees would justify their practice by A fortiori, an inference from minor to major premise, saying: "If the daughter of his son's son can inherit him (i.e. such as when her father left no male issue), is it not then fitting that his own daughter inherit him?!" (i.e. who is more closely related to him than his great granddaughter). Rabban Yohanan ben Zakkai tore down their argument, saying that the only reason the daughter was empowered to inherit her father was because her father left no male issue. However, a man's daughter – where there are sons, has no power to inherit her father's estate. Moreover, a deceased man who leaves no issue has always a distant male relative, unto whom is given his estate. The Sadducees eventually agreed with the Pharisaic teaching. The vindication of Rabban Yohanan ben Zakkai and the Pharisees over the Sadducees gave rise to this date being held in honor.] There are variants in the textual transmission, some texts writing כ"ז= "twenty-seventh" of said month, instead of כ"ד= "twenty-fourth", the result of a similarity in the letters' shape.

- "On the seventeenth day thereof (i.e. the lunar month Elul), the Romans were taken out of Judea and out of Jerusalem" [Original Aramaic: בשבעה עשר ביה איתנטילו רומאי מיהודה ומירושלים]

[Excursus: The event here referenced is briefly alluded to in The Jewish War of Josephus. During the first year of the outbreak of the war with Rome, in c. 64 CE, in the month Gorpiaios (lunar month Elul), the Roman army that was stationed in Jerusalem, under their commander Metilius, sought refuge in the towers that were built in the Upper City of Jerusalem when the Zealots had come together in anger over the mistreatment by the Roman Procurator, Florus. The Zealots descended upon the Roman army in great numbers and surrounded them and would have killed them, had it not been for Eleazar b. Jair, the leader of a party of Zealots, who gave to the Roman commander assurances under oath that they would be allowed to leave the city, without harm. Although the oath was later breached and some of the Romans were killed, according to Josephus, "there being no more than a few slain out of an immense army [that had been given a safe egress out of the city]." The departure of the Romans from the city was received with great gladness and declared a day of rejoicing.]

- "On the third day of [the lunar month] Tishri, the attributes given to denote God's Name were taken out of the legal deeds" [Original Aramaic: בג' בתשרי איתנטלית אדכרתא מן שטריא]

[Excursus: The date transcribed in Megillat Taanit is explained in Babylonian Talmud (Rosh Hashanah 18b), and represents the date in which the Sages of Israel reversed an earlier decree made by the Hasmoneans. During Macedonian hegemony over Israel, the wicked kingdom had prohibited Jews from mentioning the Name of God in their written transactions or by word of mouth. When the Hasmoneans eventually overcame their enemies, they decreed that all of Israel should thenceforth transcribe the Name of God in their legal documents; for example: "In the year such-and-such of Johanan, the High Priest of the Most-High God." However, when the Sages had fully come to understand this ruling's implication, they reasoned among themselves that if we permit common people to inscribe the Name of God in their ordinary bills of sale and promissory notes, once the debt had been paid-off and the bill of sale no longer applicable, the commoners would tear-up the bill and discard it by casting it into the dunghill, thereby showing utmost disrespect unto God's Name. For this reason they reversed the earlier decree, but not without declaring a day of merriment on the day's anniversary.]

- "On the twenty-second day thereof (i.e. the lunar month of Shevat) there was cancelled the work that had been decreed by the enemy to be brought against the Temple Sanctuary, [a day on which] it is prohibited to mourn" [Original Aramaic: בעשרים ותרין ביה בטילת עבידתא דאמר סנאה להיתאה להיכלא דלא למספד]

[Excursus: The event here is alluded to in Tosefta Sotah 13:6, the Babylonian Talmud (Sotah 33a), and fully expanded and explained by Josephus (Antiquities 18, entire 8th chapter) and by Philo (de Leg. 249). The event revolves around Caius Caligula who revered himself as a god and who had decreed that a statue of his own likeness be dedicated and set up in the Jewish Temple in Jerusalem. To affect his plan, he ordered Petronius the Roman governor of Syria to carry the image to Jerusalem, and to erect it there, but if the Jews would not admit of such an image, to presently make war with them. This act, being known, caused a great consternation among the Jews, so that when Petronius had arrived in Ptolemais to spend the winter with his troops before proceeding on to Jerusalem at the Caesar's bidding, he was met there by members of the Jewish nation who went out to placate him and to dissuade him from erecting Caesar's image in the Temple. Meanwhile, one of the Jewish High Priests heard a Divine voice proceeding out of the Holy of holies, whereby it said in the Aramaic tongue: "The work that had been decreed by the enemy to be brought against the Temple Sanctuary is now cancelled." While Petronius was deliberating on what to do, with respect to Caesar's orders, a dispatch came to him with a letter informing him that Caesar Caius had been assassinated in Rome. With his assassination, the ill-designs of the Roman emperor came to an abrupt end. When an inquiry was made as to when the Divine voice was heard, in retrospect it was learned that the Divine voice and the Caesar's demise happened on the very same day, namely, the 22nd day of the lunar month Shevat (a date corresponding to 26 January anno 37 of the Common Era).]

- "On the twelfth day thereof (i.e. the lunar month of Adar) is the day of Trajan" [Original Aramaic: בתרין עשר ביה יום טוריינוס]

[Excursus: The sense here is explained in the Babylonian Talmud (Taanit 18b) and in the Jerusalem Talmud (Taanit 12a) as having the meaning of the day in which vengeance was taken against the executioner of Lulianos and Paphos who were killed in Laodicea. Lulianos and Paphos were righteous men of the Hebrew nation who had, willfully, put themselves in harms way, in order to prevent the massacre of the innocent and unsuspecting community of Israel whom they served, and who had been wrongly accused of murdering a Gentile child. According to a rabbinic source retrieved from the Cairo Geniza, they had been killed on the 5th day of the lunar month Adar, a day in which public fasting was later made on their account. Their wrongful deaths were swiftly vindicated by the Roman authority in one week, when the executioner was himself killed, and the date being made into a day of public celebration. This day was the first day of the days mentioned in the Scroll of Fasting that was cancelled, after it had become known that the day also marked a day of sadness, when Abtalion and Shamaiah were executed some years earlier on that very day.]

- "On the thirteenth day thereof (i.e. the lunar month of Adar) is the day of Nicanor" [Original Aramaic: בתליסר ביה יום נקנור]

[Excursus: According to the Jerusalem Talmud (Taanit 2:11 [12a]), the thirteenth day of the lunar month Adar marked the day in which revenge was meted out on Nicanor, the general of Demetrius' army, who had passed through Jerusalem while en route to Alexandria in Egypt, and when he saw the strongholds of Jerusalem he began to rail on the city, lifting up his hand in defiance and casting vehement affronts and reproaches at the city, vowing to raze her towers when he returned. When Nicanor returned as governor of Judea, he engaged the men of Israel in battle who were then put under the command of Judas Maccabeus, and when the two forces met on the battlefield, Nicanor was eventually smitten and died. Seeing that their governor had been killed, Nicanor's soldiers hastily retreated and threw down their arms while in flight. The advancing army under Judas Maccabeus, when they saw that Nicanor had been killed, cut-off Nicanor's right hand and severed his head, which were then put on a pole and carried to Jerusalem, where they were set up on display before the city for all to see. Beneath the severed limbs, a script was posted which read: "[Here hangeth] the mouth that spoke in accusation; [and] the hand that was stretched out in arrogance." The event is also relayed in Josephus (Antiquities 12.10.4–5), whose account is a redaction of the account written in the Book of Maccabees (7:26–50). According to Josephus, "the Jews therein celebrate this victory every year, and esteem it as a festival day" (ibid.).]

- "On the twenty-eighth day thereof (i.e. the lunar month of Adar) good tidings came unto the Jews that they are not to let the words of the Divine Law (Torah) pass from them, [a day on which] it is prohibited to mourn" [Original Aramaic: בעשרין ותמניא ביה אתת בשורתא טבתא ליהודאי דלא יעדון מפתגמי אוריתא דילא למספד]

[Excursus: This episode is explained in the Babylonian Talmud (Taanit 18a) where it is noted that there was a time when prohibitions were decreed against the people of Israel, making it forbidden to study the Divine Law (Torah) bequeathed to them by Moses, and forbidden to perform circumcision on their sons, and that they were to profane the Sabbath day, until Judah ben Shammua and his companions came along, who, considering the condition of the Jewish people, went to a wealthy Gentile woman who was known among the principal men of Rome and petitioned her, asking her what they ought to do. She counselled them to stage a demonstration at night, which they did, and where the people shouted their complaint, saying: "Alas! By the heavens, are we not your brothers? Are we not the sons of one father? Are we not the sons of one mother? Why, then, are we discriminated against above every other nation and tongue, so that you decree against us harsh decrees?" Upon hearing this, the ruling power cancelled the decrees made against their religion, permitting them to study their Torah, circumcise their sons and to keep the holy Sabbath. The Sages declared this day as a kind of festival day, in which it was prohibited to fast and mourn.]

== Scroll of Fasts ==
The Scroll of Fasting should not be confused with the similarly-named "Scroll of Fasts", an obscure work extant in a Babylonian version and a Palestinian one. It is a list of 22–26 days where fasting should be observed, generally due to the death of Biblical figures or sages. It does not appear to have been a very influential work.

== See also ==
- Hananiah ben Hezekiah ben Garon, author
- Lulianos and Paphos, concerning "the day of Trajan" mentioned in Megillat Taanit
