= Christ, the Messenger =

Lecture and book by Swami Vivekananda

- Author: Swami Vivekananda
- Language: English
- Published: 1900
- Publisher: The Vedanta Centre, Boston
- Publication place: United States
- Text: Christ, the Messenger at Wikisource

Christ, the Messenger was a lecture delivered by Swami Vivekananda in Los Angeles, California in January 1900. In the same year, the lecture was published as a book by The Vedanta Centre, Boston. In his lecture, Vivekananda attempted to analyze the life and messages of Jesus through Vedanta.

== Synopsis ==
In his lecture, Vivekananda has compared the entire human existence to an ocean, where an individual's life is like waves. He has compared human lives with the waves rising on the ocean, and then falling down. Jesus is like a big wave that comes very rarely. Vivekananda called Jesus "The great soul, the Messenger."

== Lecture ==
Vivekananda had negative and positive things to say about Christianity. He based his arguments on his Hindu philosophy of Vedanta which was that there was only one reality in the world which was the Brahman which subsumes the core aspects of the human being, the Atman. He said that in Christ the most profound knowledge is made available to us, which is the identity of human beings and God.

Vivekananda said that the land where he was born, in a race which was the land of the Jews, was in strife with stagnation and suffering and due to differences between Pharisees and Sadducees. This caused "about the very impetus which came out at the other end as the gigantic brain of Jesus of Nazareth." The land was in the Asian region, which has lofty mountains touching the sky and large swathes of desert land.

Vivekananda looked at Jesus Christ from the prescriptive of an Orientalist as He was born in the region of Asia and thus called Jesus as an "Oriental of Orientals," though his physical features of blue eyes and yellow hair was a picture presented by Europeans. He made a comparison of the two religious beliefs of the west and the east - the former as a Greek culture of politics dominated by God of human passions. While the culture of the east was for what is beyond that which exists. All divine prophets were oriental, like Jesus. Jesus was practical in the oriental sense.

Vivekananda, in his lecture, as an analogy, drew attention to the wise sayings of Krishna, the Hindu god, from the Bhagavad Gita that: "Wherever thou findeth a great soul of immense power and purity struggling to raise humanity, know that he is born of My Splendour, that I am working there through him," and said that in addition to finding God in Jesus of Nazareth, let us find Him through all those prophets, the man-Gods, he preceded, succeeded or yet to follow Jesus, as they are all reincarnations of the same God whom we all hold in great reverence.

Vivekananda emphasized that it was essential to worship God as man, and such a god man was Christ and hence not to give up his worship as "all our ideas of God are concentrated there". However, he mentioned the drawback of Christianity as their refusal to consider other reincarnations of God in other religions. Buddha before Christ was a reincarnation of God and like him there were many more.

Vivekananda spoke that Jesus's message to all was to pursue the ideal and achieve it in one's own way, irrespective of whether one gives credit for His teachings or not. Religion is not traded like a shop owner. What is taught by Jesus is only truth, which is nobody's proprietorial right. "Truth is God Himself."

In his "oeuvre" Vivekananda said that Christ was "intensely practical" and offered a practical religion. A significant reference made by Vivekananda was to the saying from the Bible (Mathew 8:20, Luke 9:58) to stress the message that renouncing worldly matters is the way to salvation: "Foxes have holes and birds of the air have nests, but the son of Man has no place to lay his head."

== Publication ==
The lecture was first published as a book by The Vedanta Centre, Boston, in 1900. It was also included in The Complete Works of Swami Vivekananda Volume IV. The publication is based on the stenographic records of his lectures delivered in Los Angeles in January 1900 to a large audience of Christians.

== Bibliography ==
- Arangassery, Lonappan (1999). A Handbook on Catholic Eastern Churches. HIRS Publications.
- Bhide, Nivedita Raghunath (2008). Swami Vivekananda in America. Vivekananda Kendra. ISBN 978-81-89248-22-2.
- Burke, Marie Louise (1973). Swami Vivekananda, His Second Visit to the West: New Discoveries. Advaita Ashrama.
- Jongeneel, Jan A. B. (2009). Jesus Christ in World History: His Presence and Representation in Cyclical and Linear Settings. Peter Lang. ISBN 978-3-631-59688-3.
- Saraf, Nandini (2012). The Life and Times of Swami Vivekananda. Ocean Books. ISBN 978-81-8430-161-8.
- Schouten, Jan Peter (1 January 2008). Jesus as Guru: The Image of Christ Among Hindus and Christians in India. Rodopi. ISBN 978-90-420-2443-4.
- Vivekananda, Swami (24 August 2015). The Complete Works of Swami Vivekananda. Manonmani Publishers. p. 1552. GGKEY:6RUNKD3TE7K.
