= New York Hasidic education controversy =

In 2012, alumni of the New York Hasidic school system formed a group named Young Advocates for Fair Education (Yaffed) and voiced allegations that these schools, in particular boys schools, provide little to no secular education, thus initiating an ongoing campaign to bring about improvement in this matter through litigation and media exposure. These activities were met with fierce opposition from Hasidic school and community leaders who viewed it as an attack on the community's religious lifestyle, and in turn formed an organization called PEARLS (Parents for Educational and Religious Liberty in Schools), with a stated goal of defending the right to give children a religious education and to satisfy mandatory educational standards in a way that fits with the community's values.

New York officials and news media had known of the issue as far back as 2003, but did not wish to address it publicly. Yaffed's consistent activities also failed to garner support from officials, initially. A six-month Jewish Week feature in 2015 revealed details of the state of education at Hasidic yeshivas, but the reporters similarly struggled to involve dignitaries.

In 2015, a letter to the New York City Department of Education from 52 parents, former students and teachers naming specific schools ultimately had the effect, and the city, in a rare move in the history of nonpublic schools in New York, especially yeshivas, launched an investigation. The probe stretched eight years due to an accommodating approach taken towards the schools, noncooperation of some schools, a political deal between legislators and the mayor's office, and alleged further political interference. Upon concluding the investigation in June 2023, the Department of Education revealed that of twenty-seven Hasidic schools examined, four were up to the standard of secular instruction required by New York education law, five were exempt from examination, and eighteen had failed.

At the same time that the investigation was underway, the New York State Education Department revisited the law and regulations at issue, amending the law in 2018 in what became known as the 'Felder Amendment', and in 2022, introducing controversial stricter rules pertaining to the nonpublic school requirements and their enforcement.

== Background ==
=== Education law ===
New York State Education law § 3204 provides that students in private schools, which include religious schools, receive instruction that is "at least substantially equivalent" to that given at public schools of the same district.

The New York State Education Department has long provided guidance on its implementation, which outlines required academic subjects and administrative requirements. Up until changes made in 2022 as a result of the Yeshiva investigation, the guidance tasked the local education department with determining compliance, though clarifying that the department's responsibility is the students, not the schools, over which they have no direct authority.

No structured oversight model was provided, and the guidance instructed dealing with incompliance as follows; if a serious concern arose that a school's instruction was not "substantially equivalent", the local superintendent had to liaise with the school, and if necessary, visit the school to verify the concern, and work with the school on improving the standard of instruction. If the superintendent determined that the school had not designed a satisfactory plan or it continued to fall under, they were to notify the local education department. Once they approved a resolution that the school was incompliant, the department would notify the school and its students that the children would be considered truant if they continued to attend that school, and if parents continued to send their children to such a school, the parents were to be notified that truancy petitions would be filed in family court. A school official or parent could appeal the school's equivalency determination within thirty days of the local department's decision.

== Timeline of allegations and investigations ==
As far back as 2003, most government officials in New York City close to the matter reportedly knew of the lack or inadequacy of secular education in Hasidic boys' schools, also called yeshivas, but did not wish to advocate for change or even acknowledge the situation publicly. News media similarly remained quiet, worrying that they would be accused of antisemitism for reporting on it, and insiders were generally unwilling to tell their story publicly. In 2012, that changed when Naftuli Moster, an alumnus of the Hasidic educational system, founded the advocacy group Young Advocates for Fair Education (Yaffed) and begun a campaign to force New York City and State into investigating and regulating the schools.

=== Yaffed begins advocacy ===
In 2012, Moster wrote to the New York State Board of Regents which governs the New York State Education Department, saying that Hasidic schools were not meeting the Education Department's requirement that nonpublic schools teach a curriculum that is “substantially equivalent to that provided in the public schools”. The Regents replied that “although there is an equivalency of instruction requirement”, nonpublic schools “largely operate outside the scope of state-mandated general education requirements and oversight", a response Moster interpreted as the State's admission of dereliction. Upon questioning by New York Times reporters, the State Education Department said that the City Department of Education was responsible to enforce such requirements, but conversely, the City Department said it was the State's responsibility. The advocacy group then approached the superintendents of three Hasidic-populated New York districts, saying they had failed in their legally prescribed duty to enforce the requirement of "substantial equivalence" in Hasidic schools, though not naming specific schools of concern. The city's department of education responded that to warrant an investigation, Yaffed would need to identify the specific educational institutions that were failing. Moster also went to the state Capitol to present his cause, but later said it proved unproductive. In November 2014, The New York Times reported that Moster, along with several parents of children in the Haredi school system, were preparing to sue the State of New York. Then, in December, the group wrote again to high-ranking officials asking for an investigation to be made, but were ignored.

=== Jewish Week investigative reporting ===
In 2015, the Jewish Week and WNYC ran a six-month investigation into the matter, interviewing dozens of former students and teachers of Hasidic schools, education experts, lawyers, as well as community members and activists who were against government intrusion. They also reached out to various government officials and New York City Council members but most gave little or no support. Then-mayor of New York Bill de Blasio sent the paper a statement promising "zero tolerance" for inadequate secular instruction at yeshivas, and Daniel Dromm, then-Queens Councilman, gave his outspoken support, telling the Jewish Week, “We can’t have students leaving schools in New York City that can’t speak English, that have no idea of science or history or social studies,” ... “That is not allowed by the state and we cannot continue to allow that to happen”. Dromm also showed up at Yaffed Press conference. But other then-relevant council members Chaim M. Deutsch, Mark Levine and Brad Lander, as well as education regulators then-Governor Andrew Cuomo, then-State Attorney General Eric Schneiderman and then-Public Advocate Letitia James, either did not return messages from the paper or declined to comment. Then-Education Committee chairman Stephen Levin, (33rd district which includes parts of Williamsburg) stood up for the schools, saying he had "seen secular education taking place first-hand” at yeshivas in his district.

=== NYC Department of Education investigation ===
In July of that year, Yaffed sent a letter signed by 52 former yeshiva students, parents and teachers to seven district superintendents in Queens and Brooklyn and the city's schools chancellor, calling for government intervention, alleging that 39 New York yeshivas (thirty-eight in Brooklyn and one in Queens) failed to meet New York state law of “substantial equivalency”; a copy of the letter was also shared with the media. The following week, the city's department of education announced it would be investigating the allegations, telling the Jewish Week, “We take seriously our responsibility to ensure that all students in New York receive an appropriate education, and we will investigate all allegations that are brought to our attention”. Experts opined on the rarity of such a move. Several experts on the Haredi community said that city investigations into yeshiva curriculum was yet unheard of. David Bloomfield, an education professor at Brooklyn College and the CUNY Graduate Center, referring to the city's duty to oversee private schools, said, "There are political, fiscal, and legal complications involved in this" ... "all of them militate against the application of the rule".

==== City fails deadlines for report-release ====
In a news conference held by Yaffed in front of New York City Hall in April 2016, the group criticized the de Blasio administration for the lack of any noticeable headway in the probe that their letter had prompted eight months prior, and expressed the belief that the delay was politically motivated to maintain good relations with the Haredi community. The contention that the investigation had stalled was seemingly corroborated by the fact that in July 2015, Harry Hartfield, a spokesman for the education department, said it was “in the process of finalizing a set of requests” for the yeshivas, but then in 2016, Hartfield used the same words, telling news site Patch that they were “in the process of finalizing” them and would be sending them out “soon.” A spokesman for de Blasio responded to concerns of a politically motivated delay, saying the investigation was “active and ongoing", and maintained that to say the requests had not been sent out was inaccurate, but did not elaborate.

At a Council hearing in May 2016, then-Schools Chancellor Carmen Farina testified that the DOE had visited “several” yeshivas and that the probe was “moving faster.” “We now have a committee that is working exclusively on this, so I expect like within a month or so I can give you a written report”. When, in August 2017, the city had yet to publish its report, amid consistent pressure from advocates, City Department officials promised a report on its investigation by September the 22nd; Shortly thereafter, however, they said they needed more time.

At that point, many were alleging that the stalling of the investigation was due to the de Blasio administration's reliance on the Haredi voting bloc. Daniel Dromm, NYCC education committee chairman, said that at two years on and still no conclusion, he could no longer judge the mayor and chancellor favorably. Asked when the education department intended to release an investigation-report, a spokeswoman said, “The investigation is ongoing and we are treating this matter with utmost seriousness.”

==== Yaffed report ====
That September, Yaffed released its own report on the state of education in Hasidic yeshivas, in which they alleged that on average, boys aged 7–12 were given secular instruction which included reading and writing in English, four times a week for ninety minutes, and past the age of 12, boys typically ceased learning English subjects altogether; girls generally received more secular education than boys, according to the report. Addressing a claim by some that the bad state of secular education was due to lack of funds, Yaffed attempted to determine the amount of public funds going to yeshivas, which proved difficult due to yeshivas financials being unavailable. Nonetheless, they discovered that in some yeshivas, it was numbering in the hundreds of thousands or even millions of dollars.

That same month, September 2017, the education department said it had so far visited six of the thirty-nine yeshivas.

In early 2018, the department confirmed it had already visited 15 yeshivas.

==== Richard Carranza letter ====
In August 2018, three years after the DOE launched its investigation, in the first formal evidence of any findings by the department and the first sign of any conclusions reached, NYC schools Chancellor Richard Carranza wrote a 14-page letter to State Education Commissioner MaryEllen Elia in which he revealed that 15 yeshivas had repeatedly, over two years, denied the department access. Carranza wrote further that other 15 schools out of the 39 listed in the complaint had been visited (something the department had announced three months prior), and leaders of those yeshivas promised to expand secular academics; the nine other institutions, he wrote, were not within the scope of the review, mostly because they had closed or taught students older than 12th grade, and one location was not a school. He detailed how dozens of yeshivas under investigation formed a coalition in 2016 called PEARLS (Parents for Educational and Religious Liberty in Schools) to stand for the right of parents to provide their children with an education that aligned with their beliefs. PEARLS undertook to disseminate new, improved reading and math curricula and provide teacher training, in order to meet state standards, though the details received by the Education Department of these curricula were not comprehensive enough to evaluate their adequacy. The department asked the 30 yeshivas leaders to certify in writing that their respective schools would use the updated curricula in the 2016–17 school year, and City DOE staff saw nine of schools visited using the PEARLS curricula in English language arts, math, or both. Visits at cooperating schools had taken place from March through December 2017, and the letter expressed appreciation for their collaboration; "We appreciate the schools that did allow visits and the clear spirit of collaboration and interest in continuous improvement this shows”. Carranza requested guidance on how best to engage with the schools that had shown a willingness and required further steps, and how to deal with uncooperative schools.

===== Reactions =====
De Blasio, at a news conference, said, "What we did was a very thorough, careful dialogue to achieve change (...) fifteen of the schools welcomed us in, participated in an ongoing dialogue, made a number of changes, and according to our educational leaders, are doing well, and/or are making additional changes to do better. There’s another fifteen that would not allow DOE officials in the door and that, to me, is not an acceptable state of affairs.”

Moster said in a statement, “It is disappointing, but not surprising, that nearly half of the schools to be investigated refused entry to the Department of Education. Reading between the lines, it’s hard not to conclude there is both a lack of secular instruction going on in these schools and that these schools believe they are above the law.” He expressed disappointment that the school visits were pre-announced, saying this allowed the cooperating schools to “put their best foot forward — even if it was a fabricated foot.”

PEARLS, in a statement, asserted that the letter disproved the allegations against yeshivas. Avi Schick, attorney for PEARLS, denied the city's claim of barred access, saying, “It’s false, the city for this entire year has dithered”. Instead, he asserted, visits were arranged by order of school size, large to small, and the 15 schools the city had visited had over four times the number of students as the remaining schools. Carranza's claim, however, was later backed up by the DOI's report on political interference. Referring to the schools that were not using PEARLS's curriculum, Schick said the stronger schools were probably confident that their own secular materials were sufficient. He also said Yaffed's allegations unfairly smeared a yeshiva system that had 465 Jewish day schools statewide, including 275 schools in New York City. Many Jewish day schools are known for offering rigorous educations.

==== DOI investigation into stalling ====
In mid-2018, the New York City Department of Investigation (DOI) opened an inquiry into the delay of the Department of Education's yeshiva investigation amid the allegations of it being a result of politically motivated interference at the hand of the de Blasio administration.

Whistleblowers alleged that the DOI was stalling investigations into politically driven delays in the Yeshiva investigation, to protect de Blasio's image ahead of his 2020 presidential campaign

In November 2019, anonymous DOI whistleblowers alleged that its investigation into the stalling, among other investigations into the administration, itself was being stalled to protect de Blasio's image for his imminent presidential campaign, something both the mayor's office and the DOI categorically denied. Naftuli Moster reacted, saying, "Now it appears the investigation into possible mayoral interference is also being stonewalled, we need to get to the bottom of this”.

===== Findings =====
On December 19, 2019, the DOI and the Special Commissioner of Investigations (SCI) released a joint-investigation report which stated that while the de Blasio administration did not commit any crime or violation, it did deliberately delay the release of the interim report for political gains; the content of the report, however, was not affected. "Political horse-trading" was conducted between NY City Hall and state legislators, whereby the mayor's office agreed to delay the interim report on the yeshivas so that politicians wouldn't feel pressure from their Orthodox constituents, who in turn would work on furthering mayoral control of public schools, something which was being debated upon at that time. Other causes for delay were cases of yeshivas lawyers noncompliance with city requests for information about their curriculum, as well as a decision by the department to take an "accommodating approach" towards the conflict; at the time of the political deal, two years from the start of the investigation, the DOE had only visited six out of thirty yeshivas.

====== Reactions ======
De Blasio's office defended him, saying, “There's no 'there' there, as evidenced by the finding of no wrongdoing. The Department of Investigation and the Special Commissioner of Investigation made clear there were no findings ready for release in 2017. In fact, the DOI report accurately identifies why this process has taken so long, including ever-changing state regulations and the difficulty of gaining access to some schools."

Naftuli Moster called it "a disgrace", saying it demonstrated that "the city is willing to trade away the education of tens of thousands of students for power and political influence", and raised concerns as to whether the waited-for report would be reliable.

Simcha Eichenstein, an assemblyman who represents the Brooklyn Hasidic community and previously worked for de Blasio's legislative affairs team, pointed at the finding that no illegalities were committed and said, "Nothing newsworthy here."

==== DOE reports (2019, 2023) ====
The next day, on September 20, 2019, the DOE released the interim report. In the years following, the investigation almost completely stalled.

In January 2023, State Education Commissioner Betty Rosa accused the city DOE of stalling the investigation for "political reasons", and demanded the report be published no later than June 30, including specific reviews of each individual school.

On the day of the deadline, June 30, 2023, eight years from the start of its investigation into Hasidic yeshivas, the city Department of Education released the final report of its findings in form of letters and verbal statements. Of the over 200 boys' and girls' Hasidic schools in New York at this point, 39 yeshivas were included in the complaint in 2015, from which the city had removed some that were not relevant, leaving twenty-eight schools. Of those, two had been found to be substantially equivalent in 2019, two were more recently verified to be meeting the substantial equivalency standard, five others were deemed to be so due to their affiliation with other schools that were substantially equivalent, under newly revised state regulations, and eighteen schools were found to be falling short, including one that didn't provide any secular education at all. The verdict on fourteen of those found failing was ultimately up to the state's discretion under the Felder Amendment, and the city recommended that the state reach the same conclusion.

Twelve days later, on July 12, 2023, Yaffed filed a legal petition with the State Education Commissioner (which judges appeals brought under state education law), demanding that the five schools approved due to their affiliation with registered high schools, be examined on their own merit, and the examination of two schools that had passed in deference to the 2019 preliminary findings, be revisited and completed.

== Regulation ==
=== Felder Amendment ===
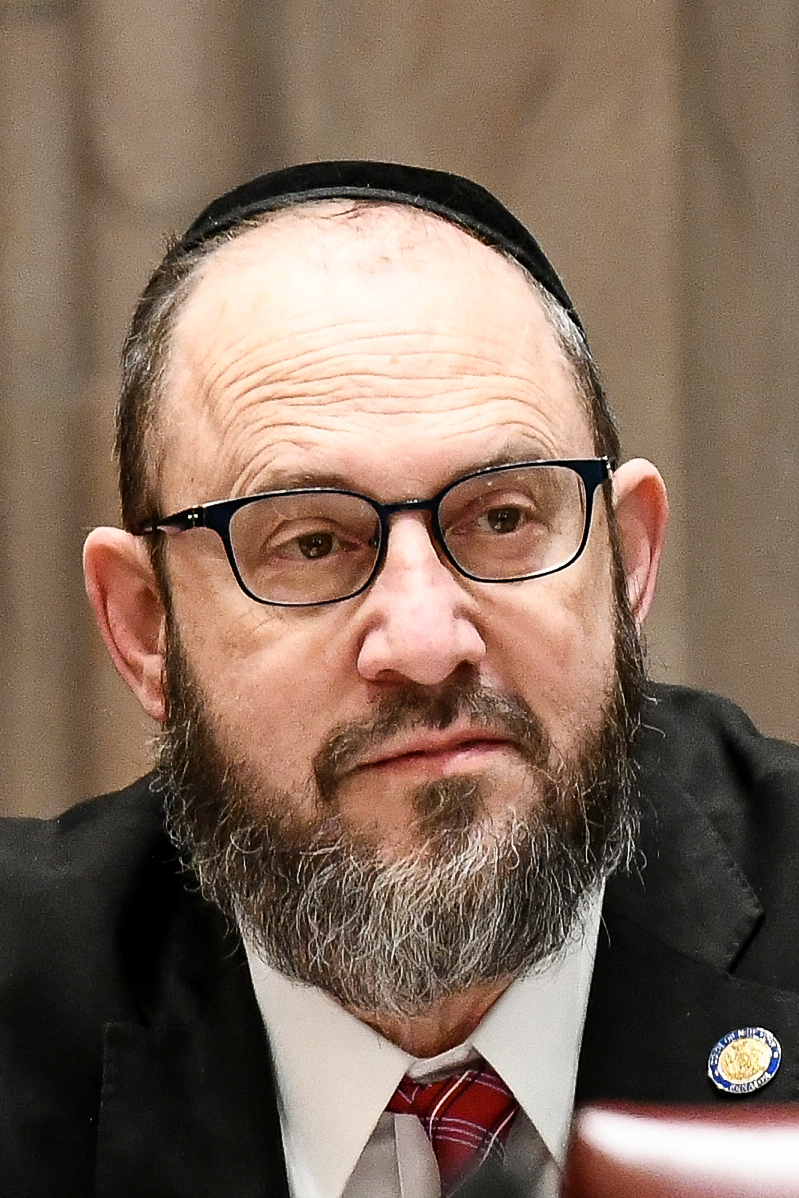
State Senator Simcha Felder, the namesake of the Felder Amendment

In spring of 2018, while critics were calling for the DOE to speed up their investigation, State Senator Simcha Felder, representative of a largely Hasidic district that encompasses Borough Park and Flatbush, introduced a bill designed for yeshivas that, if passed, would broaden the criteria of the "substantial equivalency" law for them over that of other schools, and would shift the determination as to whether these schools met the criteria of substantial equivalence from the hands of the local DOE to the State Education Department, essentially blunting the DOE investigation. The bill passed when Felder held up a state budget deal until the legislature agreed to support the amendment.

In July 2018, Yaffed filed a lawsuit against the state, arguing that the law violated the First Amendment in that it was designed for a religious group. The case was dismissed by a judge in January 2019 due to Yaffed's lack of legal standing.

=== SED substantial equivalency rules ===
The DOE investigation triggered a debate of what exactly substantial equivalency means, prompting the state to develop rules for determining it.

On November 20, 2018, the State Education Department released a new set of rules for nonpublic schools. By the new rules, nonpublic schools not substantially equivalent with public schools would be given a timeline to reach compliance, upon which government-funded services such as textbooks and transportation could be withheld, and students would ultimately be directed to go to another school or be declared truant. Local school districts would visit each nonpublic school every five years and determine compliance, including those schools covered by the Felder Amendment, whose results would be passed on to the state.

==== Opposition ====
In March 2019, Several lawsuits were filed by Jewish, Catholic and independent organizations, including the NYSAIS, against the new SED guidelines. The next month, April 2019, Albany County Supreme Court nullified the new guidance, regarding it as "new rules" which set a schedule and process for evaluating compliance rather than just a "new interpretation" of the existing guidelines, thereby requiring a public consultation process in accordance with the state's own Administrative Procedure Act, something it had failed to do.

==== Second version ====
Less than two months later, on May 31, 2019, the State Department released a new set of rules, this time classifying them as regulations, not just guidelines, and set a three-month public comment period, in compliance with the court ruling.

In February 2020, The department said it would be reviewing the regulations after receiving 140,000 public comments on the issue in just three months, with, media sources said, the vast majority opposing the plan. Opposition mainly came from yeshivas, but also spanned others in the nonpublic school sector including other faith schools and Manhattan private schools who viewed it as a threat to their autonomy.

In 2021, the department held a series of stakeholder meetings with both private and public schools.

In March 2022, the department announced the release of reviewed regulations, followed by a comment period. On September 12, 2022, a day after the New York Times investigative report, a Board of Regents committee unanimously approved the amended regulations which went into immediate effect for the state's estimated 1,800-2,000 nonpublic schools, 911 of them in NYC including 102 yeshivas.

== See also ==
- Talmud Torah
- Cheder
- Yeshiva
- Jewish education
- Education in New York City
- Education in New York (state)
