= Jewish education =

Teaching of Judaism to Jews

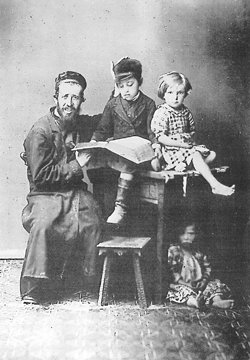
A Jewish father teaching a child in 19th-century Podolia.

Jewish education (Hebrew: חינוך, romanized: Chinuch) refers to the teaching and transmission of Judaism through religious texts, values and traditions that are being passed down from generations. For Jews, education has played a significant role since ancient times, beginning with learning at home. Over time, Jewish education has developed into a more formal setting like cheder and yeshiva specifically where study has become a part of daily life and cultural identity. In today's society Jewish education has taken many forms from day schools, Hebrew schools and adult learning. There remains a strong emphasis on continuing Jewish education to connect individuals and help adapt to needs and values of a more modernized Jewish life.

== History ==
=== Biblical period ===
Jewish education has been valued since the birth of Judaism. In the Hebrew Bible Abraham is lauded for instructing his offspring in God's ways. One of the basic duties of Jewish parents is to provide for the instruction of their children as set forth in the first paragraph of the Shema Yisrael prayer: "Take to heart these instructions with which I charge you this day. Impress them upon your children. Recite them when you stay at home and when you are away, when you lie down and when you get up. Bind them as sign on your hand and let them serve as a symbol on your forehead; inscribe them on the doorposts of your house and your gates" (Deut. 6:6-9). Additionally, children are advised to seek the instruction of their parents: "Remember the days of old, consider the years of many generations; ask thy father, and he will declare unto thee, thine elders, and they will tell thee" (Deut. 32:7). The Book of Proverbs also contains many verses related to education: "My son, do not forget my teaching, but let your mind retain my commandments; For they will bestow on you length of days, years of life and well-being" (Prov. 3:1-2).

The Second Book of Chronicles depicts Jehoshaphat, who was a king of Judah in the 9th century BCE, commissioning royal officials, Levites, and priests to teach from "the scroll of the Torah of YHWH" throughout all the cities of Judah (2 Chronicles 17:7–9). According to Gary N. Knoppers, this royally sponsored campaign in Torah literacy may reflect the Chronicler's own ideology rather than straightforwardly mirroring either Jehoshaphat's own era or the post-exilic period.

=== Second Temple period ===
Rabbinic sources credit Simeon ben Shetach (late Hasmonean period) and Joshua ben Gamla (around the First Jewish–Roman War) with decrees making elementary education compulsory. According to Moshe Aberbach, whether or not these accounts are historical, they "indicate that, possibly influenced by Greek models, Jews envisaged a school system long before a viable one was created".

Archaeological evidence from Herodium has also been read as pointing to bilingual elite tutoring during the late Second Temple period. Archaeologist Avner Ecker identifies several inscriptions from the theatre and palace areas as possible evidence for the presence of teachers and students, while one room adjoining the theatre may have occasionally served as a classroom. Their low height (none exceeding 1.5 metres) together with their content, led Ecker to suggest that some were written by children. The evidence includes alphabet exercises in Greek and Hebrew/Aramaic, with the Hebrew/Aramaic examples preserved on an ostracon in two distinct hands, possibly representing a teacher's model and a student's copy. At least some of the Aramaic instruction appears to have been practical, possibly involving the writing of documents, as suggested by an inscription containing a date formula giving the day and month, year, and place (Jerusalem). Ecker also notes evidence for the study of Homeric material.

The education of older boys and men in a beit midrash can be traced back to the Second Temple period.

=== Rabbinic period ===
The Talmud, states that children should begin school at six, and should not be kept from education by other tasks.

According to Judah ben Tema, "At five years the age is reached for studying Mikra, at ten for studying the Mishnah, at thirteen for fulfilling the mitzvoth, at fifteen for studying Talmud" (Avot 5:21). Mikra refers to the written Torah, Mishnah refers to the complementary oral Torah (the concise and precise laws dictating how the written Torah's commandments are achieved) and Talmud refers to comprehension of the oral and written law's unity and contemplation of the laws. The term "Talmud" used here is a method of study and is not to be confused by the later compilations by the same name. In keeping with this tradition, Jews established their own schools or hired private tutors for their children until the end of the 18th century. Schools were housed in annexes or separate buildings close to the synagogue.

According to the Mishnah, rabbis banned teaching Greek after either the First Jewish–Roman War (led by Titus) or the later Diaspora Revolt (led by Quietus). Both conflicts were accompanied by violence against Jews by Greek populations.

Rabban Gamaliel, the son of Rabbi Judah Hanasi said that the study of the Torah is excellent when combined with Derech Eretz, worldly occupation, for toil in them both keeps sin out of one's mind; But [study of the] Torah which is not combined with a worldly occupation, in the end comes to be neglected and becomes the cause of sin.

== Formality of Jewish Education ==
=== Sex segregation ===
Jewish education has traditionally included sex segregation, in which boys and girls were often taught separately to help reflect different educational expectations. Jewish boys received instruction in Hebrew and later the Talmud, with study usually occurring in settings such as the cheder or yeshiva. Girls' education was more heavily focused on practical skills and religious practices to help support their family. During the early 20th century, these social and education expectations changed, which opened many opportunities for girls. Formal Jewish schools were established, which allowed for a more formal approach to religious and general studies. Depending on the specific branch of Judaism, there are now different approaches to teaching girls and boys. In many Orthodox communities, gender-segregated education is seen as a way to create learning environments that reduce social stress and provide more help to students' religious development. These schools also want to reduce the amount of distraction that happens between girls and boys during adolescent years.

=== Primary schooling ===
The Talmud (Tractate Bava Bathra 21a) attributes the institution of formal Jewish education to the first century sage Joshua ben Gamla. Prior to this, parents taught their children informally. Ben Gamla instituted schools in every town and made education compulsory from the age of 6 or 7. The Talmud attaches great importance to the "Tinokot shel beth Rabban" (the children [who study] at the Rabbi's house), stating that the world continues to exist for their learning and that even for the rebuilding of the Temple in Jerusalem, classes are not to be interrupted (Tractate Shabbat 119b).

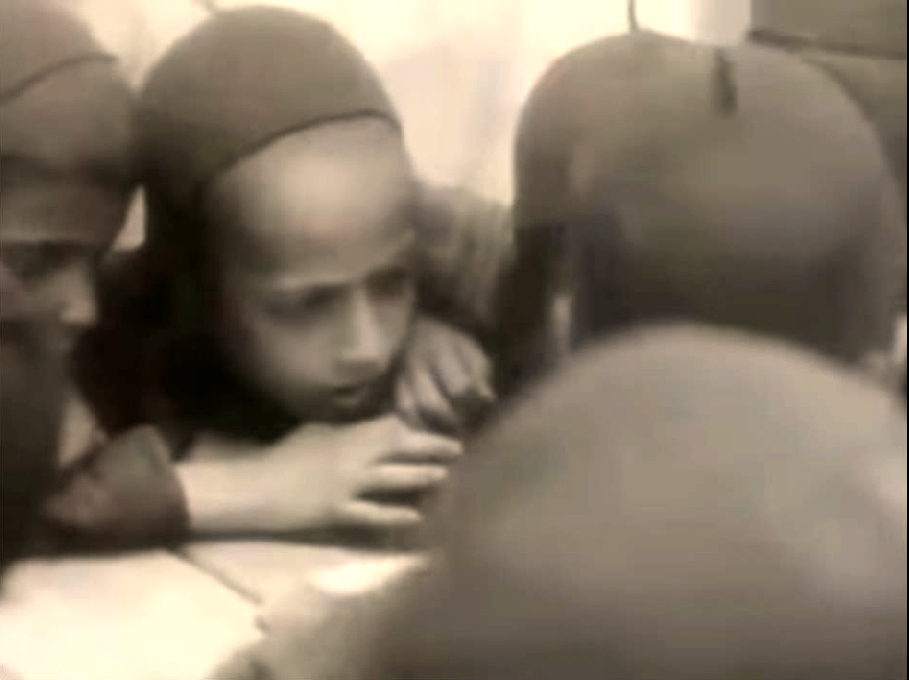
Jewish children of a "cheder" in Sana'a Yemen, 1929

=== Yeshiva ===
In ancient times, Jewish learning often took place in small groups where students gathered around a teacher or rabbi to study and discuss religious teachings. These early study circles focused mainly on the Torah and the oral traditions that were passed down long before they were written into the Mishnah. Students learned by asking questions, debating ideas, and listening to interpretations, creating a learning style centered on discussion. Local communities supported this kind of study, encouraging young people who showed interest or ability to continue learning. Over time, these informal gatherings developed into more organized schools that would eventually become the early foundations of the yeshiva.

==== Antiquity ====
In Mishnaic and Talmudic times young men were attached to a beth din (court of Jewish law), where they sat in three rows and progressed as their fellow students were elevated to sit on the court.

After the formal court system was abolished, yeshivot became the main places for Torah study. The Talmud itself was composed largely in the yeshivot of Sura and Pumbedita in Babylonia, and the leading sages of the generation taught there. Until the 19th century, young men generally studied under the local rabbi, who was allocated funds by the Jewish community to maintain a number of students. The Hasidic masters and the Lithuanian rabbi Chaim Volozhin both founded centralised yeshivot; see Yeshiva#History.

==== Modernity ====
Yeshivot have remained of central importance in the Orthodox community to this day. Presently, there are numerous yeshivot - particularly in the US and Israel, but, in general, wherever there is an established Orthodox community. The idea of Yeshivas have always been popular in Orthodox communities in modern times.

Currently, the largest Yeshiva organization in the US is Yeshiva University, which is in New York City. It offers both religious and secular degrees, as is also the case for many other yeshivas both in Israel and the US. In Israel, the largest yeshiva is Mir Yeshiva. In the 20th century, Hesder (Israeli Religious Zionist) and Modern Orthodox yeshivot were also founded. In all of these communities, yeshiva study is common, with young men (and women in a midrasha) spending several years post high school studying Torah. In the Haredi / Hasidic communities, their study often spans decades.

In October 2022 the Israel Democracy Institute was able to compile a 200-page bibliography of research on Israeli Haredim. Many people in Haredi communities believe that this was a targeted attack, since the bibliography was seen as obsessive by many. Some believe this idea gained traction due to the New York Times article "In Hasidic Enclaves, Failing Private Schools Flush with Public Money," which was written by Eliza Shapiro and Brian M. Rosenthal. The criticism of the article expressed that if this was to happen in the US they would not have more than a page or two on a study.

Education researchers have discussed how contemporary Orthodox Jewish education addresses challenges posed by contradictions between rabbinic literature and external historical sources. Five key tools have been identified—exclusion, allegorization, synthesis, accommodation, and rejection—that educators can use to reconcile these discrepancies while maintaining respect for tradition and intellectual integrity. The choice of method depends on the educational context, audience, and school culture, with strictly Orthodox settings favoring exclusion or allegorization to preserve rabbinic authority, and Modern Orthodox or academic environments being more open to synthesis, accommodation, or even rejection of certain claims. This line of research stresses the importance of balancing the Jewish value of seeking truth with communal norms, enabling educators to navigate complex historical questions in a way that strengthens students' faith and critical thinking. Such an approach can be a valuable resource for understanding how Orthodox Jewish education engages with historical and theological challenges in the modern era.

There have been many changes in the yeshivas due to the advancement of technology. This includes the use of online libraries of Torah studies, which became popular during the 2020 COVID-19 pandemic as many yeshivas were forced to pivot online. This created a new model of Torah study that blends traditional and modern traditions. The funding of these modern schools rely on donations, which means that yeshivas do not have a strong stable financial stability. Non-orthodox streams have yeshivot also, although these are intended (almost entirely) for Rabbinic preparation. Their syllabi similarly depart from the traditional ideals.

A 2023 census of supplemental Jewish education in the United States and Canada reported that enrollment in Hebrew schools fell by at least 45 percent between 2006 and 2020, even as the estimated number of Jewish children in the United States increased. The report also identified growth in some nontraditional programs and in schools operated by the Chabad-Lubavitch movement; Chabad's share of supplemental-school enrollment CKids rose from 4 percent to 10 percent, and its share of schools from 13 percent to 21 percent, during the same period.

==== Secular education emphasis ====
In the 21st century, critics in both the United States and Israel have protested that (some) Haredi and Hasidic yeshivas are teaching religious studies to the exclusion of secular subjects such as mathematics and science. This Haredi aversion to secular studies manifests differently in Israel and outside Israel.

In America, some yeshivas of Haredi (Ultra-Orthodox), but non-Hasidic (Lithuanian) identity, offer state-compliant secular education curriculums. For example, Yeshiva Torah Vodaas runs a "NYS Board of Regents certified High School" with a contemporary curriculum "in compliance with the latest Common Core standards."

American Hasidic yeshivas, from elementary to high school levels, have a long history of shying away from all but the most rudimentary exposure to secular studies. For example, when several decades ago Rabbi Shlomo Halberstam of the Bobov Hasidic dynasty was met with intensified calls for higher-level secular education from Hasidic parents of Bobov-affiliated yeshivas, Halberstam rejected their pleas and stated that on principle he would not compromise "even if it means that I will have no more than one student." Critics such as Naftuli Moster have worked to promote the adoption of national or state standards on secular subjects by such yeshivas.

A New York Times investigation into the quality of education in the more than 100 all-boys schools across Brooklyn and the lower Hudson Valley in 2022 revealed that the schools generally taught only rudimentary English and math and no science or history, while receiving more than $1 billion in government money in the previous four-year period. The NYT investigation alleged that the current secular curriculum in most New York Hasidic boys' schools exists for children between the ages of 8 and 12 only and consists of reading and math, four days a week, often for 90 minutes a day, and only after a full day of religious lessons. English teachers are often not fluent in the language themselves, and there have been anecdotes of students correcting their teachers on the spelling of words such as 'math', misspelled as 'mathe'. Select schools do provide more robust syllabi which include science and social studies, and interactive learning programs such as fairs and spelling bees.

Richard Bamberger, a spokesman for Hasidic schools, and J. Erik Connolly, a Chicago lawyer representing Hasidic schools, denied claims by the NYT and others that graduates of the schools were unable to speak or write in English. Echoing Hasidic leaders, they quoted data showing that Jewish schools in general perform well on standardized tests for high school students. NYT reporters countered that these results almost entirely reflect the performance of students at non-Hasidic schools; most Hasidic schools do not administer state standardized tests at all, but in 2019 some did give these exams, and 99% of the thousands of Hasidic boys who took them, failed, in contrast to 49% of all New Yorkers who passed. Additionally, accounts of almost three dozen then-current and former teachers across the state's Hasidic yeshivas, including in those schools that do not administer standardized test, revealed that most of the thousands of boys whom they had taught had left school without learning to speak English fluently, let alone read or write at grade level; in regards to math, most could add and subtract, some could also multiply and divide, but few could do more.

Following the NYT reporting, concerns were raised by some local politicians as to the standard of secular education provided. Particular criticism followed accounts of corporal punishment in the schools.

Despite these apparent short-comings, there has been research that suggests that a traditional Yeshiva education can be an indicator of later success in law school, whether that relationship is causal or merely correlative remains a matter of debate.

The educational philosophy of Hasidic and most non-Hasidic Haredi yeshivas in Israel is largely similar to that of their American counterparts, i.e. opposed to secular studies, no path to attaining a Bagrut certificate. As of 2017, percentage of Haredi girls taking matriculation exams was 51% (up from 31% a decade prior; for boys it was 14% (down from 16%), since Orthodox yeshivot mostly ignore core subjects. About 8 percent of Haredi students pass the exam. Miriam Ben-Peretz, professor emeritus of education at the University of Haifa, and winner of the 2006 Israel Prize notes: "More and more Israeli students don't have any foundation of knowledge, any basics — not in math, not in English, not in general...things have to change." Some Israelis who have been educated in Haredi yeshivas have established Out for Change, an organization seeking to sue the government for alleged failure to enforce Israel's law for compulsory education. There is a similar organization in America called YAFFED (Young Advocates for Fair Education).

=== Schools ===
The phenomenon of the Jewish day school is of relatively common origin which was until the 19th and 20th century, boys attended the cheder or talmud Torah, where they were taught by a melamed tinokos (children's teacher).

The first Jewish day school developed in Germany, largely in response to the higher emphasis of the want of secular studies. Rabbis who pioneered Jewish day schools included Rabbi Shimson Raphael Hirsch, were leading figures in this movement his Realschule in Frankfurt am Main served as an example of how traditional jewish education could be shown in academic subjects. Jews have also been disproportionately engaged in the building of academic institutions of education and in promoting teaching as a professional career. Three of the past four presidents of the American Federation of Teachers have been Jews: starting with Albert Shanker, her successor Sandra Feldman, all the way to current AFT president, Randi Weingarten.

In the United States, Jewish day schools had expanded through the 20th century. Once 2007 change around there were over 750 day schools and 205,000 students in those schools. [17] Beyond those students, hundreds of thousands (~250,000) of Jewish children attend supplementary religious, Hebrew, and congregational schools that provided part-time instruction in Jewish history [17].

=== Girls and women ===
Formal Jewish girls' education is a 20th-century phenomena. Prior to this women learned basic Jewish concepts and halakha in an informal setting with parents or other family members, apart from occasional instances where women learned Torah intensively.

One of the main arguments for this educational inequality of discouraging women from learning Torah related topics is found in the Talmud. According to Rabbi Eliezer in Tractate Sotah: 'If a man teaches his daughter Torah, it's as if he's teaching her foolishness.' Traditional religious views were that women were not on the same intellectual level as men, and therefore were unable to understand the intricacies of the Torah and Talmud.

This situation changed largely due to the efforts of Sara Schnirer, who founded the first Jewish girls' school Bais Yaakov in Kraków in Poland in 1918. leading to the formation of the Beth Jacob Movement. From the 19th century onward, public education became compulsory in most of Europe, and Jewish schools were established in order to maintain educational control over Jewish children.

In the Beth Jacob system, women primarily learn Torah, and also some halacha (Jewish religious law), but not the Talmud. This means that they are not only taught Torah but are also taught 'the lifestyle of being a homemaker, and supporting their husbands who want to learn in yeshiva all day.'

Girls in the United States at this time were often educated at public schools together with boys, and they received their Jewish education through programs at synagogues and Sunday schools, as Jewish day schools were less common.

After the end of World War II, women moved into Jewish studies research and teaching. The balance of education for women and men has made great strides in equality in Jewish schools.

== Informality ==
=== Youth groups ===
Studies created in 2024 estimate there are approximately 650,000 Jewish middle and high school students. Many of these students participated in Jewish youth groups or in activities funded by Jewish youth organizations Jewish youth organizations. These groups vary by religious affiliation and structure but heavily focus on youth leadership and community involvement. With these youth movements playing a major role in cultural development and early Zionist activities are Zionist youth movements. The various organizations differ in political ideology, religious affiliation, and leadership structure, although they all tend to be characterized by a focus on youth leadership and community involvement.

The Conservative movement has United Synagogue Youth (USY). The Modern Orthodox movement has National Conference of Synagogue Youth (NCSY). BBYO is a non-denominational group, though most Jews associate it with the Reform movement. The North American Federation of Temple Youth (NFTY) is the organized youth movement of Reform Judaism in North America. Funded and supported by the Union for Reform Judaism, NFTY exists to supplement and support Reform youth groups at the synagogue level. About 750 local youth groups affiliate themselves with the organization, comprising over 8,500 youth members.

=== Summer camps ===
Jewish summer camps are significant in creating ties with a particular denomination of Judaism and/or orientation to Israel. They can be sponsored by movements such as Orthodox, Conservative, Reconstructionist, and Reform Judaism; by Jewish community centers; and by Zionist movements such as Young Judaea, Betar, Habonim Dror, Hashomer Hatzair and B'nei Akiva. In the United States there are over 70,000 campers who participate in over 150 non-profit Jewish summer camps yearly that are supported by 8,500 counselors. These camp models can be found in other countries including Israel that remain in operation to support cultural and educational development.

The Camp Ramah network, affiliated with Conservative Judaism, runs camps in North America where youngsters experience traditional Shabbat observance, study Hebrew and observe the laws of kashrut.

The Union for Reform Judaism runs the largest Jewish camping system in the world, the URJ Camp & Israel Programs. They operate 13 summer camps across North America, including a sports specialty camp, teen leadership institute and programs for youth with special needs, as well as a number of Israel travel programs. Participants in these programs observe Shabbat, engage in programming about Jewish values and history, and partake in typical summer camp activities including athletics, creative arts and color war.

=== Student organizations ===
Much informal Jewish education is organized on university campuses. This is often supported by national organizations, such as Hillel (United States) or the Union of Jewish Students (United Kingdom), or by international organizations such as the World Union of Jewish Students and the European Union of Jewish Students.

The Rohr Jewish Learning Institute in partnership with The Chabad on Campus International Foundation, manages the Sinai Scholars Society, an integrated fellowship program for college campus students comprising Torah study, social activities, and national networking opportunities.

=== Drama ===
One of the earliest examples of drama-based Jewish education is the theatrical works of Rabbi Moshe Chaim Luzatto (Ramchal 1707–1746, b. Italy), who wrote plays with multiple characters on Jewish themes. While the use of such plays was probably rare in traditional Jewish education, the Etz Chaim school of Jerusalem reportedly staged plays in the 1930s.

From the 20th century onward drama has been used as an educational tool. Programs such as Jewish Crossroads by Shlomo Horwitz provide educational theater in schools and synagogues in various English-speaking countries. The Lookstein Center at Bar-Ilan University, a think tank geared to Jewish educators in the Diaspora, lists many drama-related programs on their website for use of teachers in the classroom.

=== Sports ===
Sports is another vehicle to connect Jewish youth to Judaism and Israel. Bring It In - Israel offers a sports volunteering program in Israel that cultivates a cadre of young leaders who return to their communities to promote interest in Israel and Judaism. The perceived role of sports as a historical avenue was crucial for Jewish people to overcome social, religious and cultural obstacles toward their participation in secular society (especially in Europe and the United States).

== Sources ==
- The World of the Jewish Youth Movement by Daniel Rose - on movements and informal education
