= Ananelus =

High Priest in Jerusalem, 1st century BCE

High Priest of Judaea
- Reign: c. 37 – 36 BCE
- Predecessor: Antigonus II Mattathias
- Successor: Aristobulus III of Judea

High Priest of Judaea
- Reign: c. 36 – 30 BCE
- Predecessor: Aristobulus III of Judea
- Successor: Jesus, son of Fabus
- Dynasty: Herodian
- Religion: Judaism

Ananelus (also known as Hanameel) was the High Priest of the Temple in Jerusalem in the 1st century BCE. Though a kohen, he was not a member of the Hasmonean dynasty. The Mishnah, Parah 3:5, identifies him as 'Hanameel the Egyptian', while Josephus ("Ant." xv. 2, § 4) identifies him as being from 'Babylon' (Lower Mesopotamia), but could also denote the Babylon Fortress (near what is now Cairo).

Ananelus was appointed by Herod the Great to fill the office of High Priest made vacant by the execution of Antigonus II Mattathias in 37 BCE. Ananelus' incumbency was brief. Prudence compelled Herod to remove him, and to fill his place with the Aristobulus III of Judea (36 BCE). However, Aristobulus was too popular; as he was a Hasmonean and a brother of Mariamne I, Herod's beloved wife, he was drowned at Herod's instigation in 35 BCE, and Ananelus was restored to position. How long Ananelus was in office could not have been for many years, since, after the execution of Mariamne in 29 BCE, Herod remarried and appointed his second father-in-law, Simon son of Boethus, to the High Priesthood, removing Jesus, son of Fabus.

Ananelus is credited with having prepared the penultimate of seven total red heifers, which were provided in all the centuries from Ezra's restoration to the final dispersion of the Jews (Parah 3:5).

Jewish titles
Preceded by Antigonus II	High Priest of Israel; 37 BCE – 36 BCE	Succeeded by Aristobulus III
Preceded by Aristobulus III	High Priest of Israel; 36 BCE –30 BCE	Succeeded by Joshua ben Fabus
