= Simon son of Boethus =

Jewish high priest (r. c. 23 BCE - 4 BCE)

Simon, son of Boethus (also known as Simon son of Boëthus, Simeon ben Boethus or Shimon ben Boethus) (Hebrew: שמעון בן ביתוס) was a Jewish High priest (ca. 23 – 4 BCE) in the 1st century BCE and father-in-law of Herod the Great. According to Josephus, he was also known by the name Cantheras (Hebrew: קתרוס). His family is believed to have been connected to the school of the Boethusians, and a family whose origins are from Alexandria in Egypt.

He succeeded Jesus, son of Fabus and was removed by Herod when his daughter, Mariamne II was implicated in the plot of Antipater against her husband in 4 BCE. As a result, Herod divorced her and removed her father (Simon Boethus) as high priest. Simon's grandson Herod II was removed from the line of succession in Herod's last will.

Starting with Simon, the house of Boethus became very influential in Jerusalem. Even though Simon, himself, was removed from his high priestly position, his son Joazar was appointed to that post soon after. Three other sons and a son-in-law also became high priests. According to Stern, "It would thus appear that the three sons of Simeon ben Boethus of Herod’s time, Joazar, Eleazar and Simeon, served at one time or another as high priests".

The members of this family also continued to be influential in Jerusalem up to the time of the great revolt. A passage in the Talmud lists the house of Boethus first among the other families of the high priesthood during these times.

== See also ==
- Boethus (family)
- Simon son of Joseph

Jewish titles
Preceded by Jesus, son of Fabus	High Priest of Israel; 23 BCE – 5 BCE	Succeeded by Matthias ben Theophilus
