= Antigonus of Sokho =

Second century BCE Jewish scholar

Antigonus of Sokho (Hebrew: אנטיגנוס איש סוכו) was one of the first scholars of whom Jewish tradition has preserved not only the name but also an important theological doctrine. He flourished in the first decades of the second century BCE.

According to the Mishnah, he was the disciple of Simon the Just (Hebrew: שמעון הצדיק).

Antigonus is the first noted Jew to have a Greek name, a fact commonly discussed by scholars regarding the extent of Hellenic influence on Judaism following the conquest of Judaea by Alexander the Great.

A street in the Katamonim neighborhood of Jerusalem is named after him.

== Sadducees and Boethusians ==
Traditional Jewish sources connect Antigonus with the origin of the Sadducees and Boethusians. These sources argue that the Sadducee group originated in tandem with the Boethusian group during the Second Temple period, with their founders, Zadok and Boethus, both being individual students of Antigonus of Sokho.

== Surviving quotation ==
His sole surviving quotation ran: "Be not like servants who serve their master for the sake of reward; rather, be like servants who do not serve their master for the sake of reward, and let the awe of Heaven be upon you" (Artscroll translation). It sums up the Pharisaic doctrine that good should be done for its own sake, and evil be avoided, without regard to consequences, whether advantageous or detrimental.

The conception dominant in the Hebrew Bible, that God's will must be done to obtain His favor in the shape of physical prosperity, was rejected by Antigonus' disciple (see below), as well as the view, specifically called "Pharisaic," which makes reward in the afterlife the motive for human virtue.

Without denying reward in the afterlife, Antigonus asserts that men's actions should not be influenced by the lowly sentiment of fear of mortals, but that there is a divine kingdom of which men must stand in awe.

According to Maimonides, Zadok was a pupil of Antigonus and possibly the founder of the Sadducees. Maimonides claims he misconstrued his teachings (the above motto) to mean that there is no afterlife.

== See also ==
- Hellenistic Judaism
