= Abba Saul ben Batnit =

1st-century rabbi

Abba Saul ben Batnit (Hebrew: אבא שאול בן בטנית, "Abba Shaul ben Batnit") was a Tanna of the latter period of the Second Temple of Jerusalem, approximately two generations before the temple's destruction. He used to take questions from the Jewish public and answer on matters of the halakha, while working as a grocer. In his latter job he became known for being strict on not taking spoils and preserving a fellowman's finances, and for that reason, among others, he donated a significant amount of oil to the Jewish public, in order to revoke any suspicions about public exploitation.

In the Babylonian Talmud, Abba Jose Ben Hanin cites, on Abba Saul's behalf, a saying of criticism on the families of the high priests, who were identified with the Sadducees and their familiars, and who at this time were in charge of the Second Temple of Jerusalem:

"Woe is me because of the house of Boethus, woe is me because of their staves. Woe is me because of the house of Hanin, woe is me because of their whisperings. Woe is me because of the house of Kathros, woe is me because of their pens. Woe is me because of the house of Ishmael the son of Phabi, woe is me because of their fists. For they are High Priests, and their sons are [Temple] treasurers, and their sons-in-law are trustees (amarkolim), and their servants beat the people with staves".

The historian Josephus said that during the high priesthood of Ishmael the son of Phabi, his servants would forcibly remove the tithes from the thrashing floors, what had been given voluntarily before him.
