= Hananiah ben Hezekiah ben Garon =

Hananiah ben Hezekiah ben Garon (Hebrew: חנניה בן חזקיה בן גרון, or in short חנניה בן חזקיה, "Hananiah ben [Son of] Hezekiah") was a Tannaitic Jewish sage and contemporary of the Houses of Shammai and Hillel.

He is recounted as being one of several sages who weighed in on the question of the canonization of the Book of Ezekiel. It is said that he took 300 barrels of oil up to his aliyah (upper room), shut himself in, and studied the group's claims until he was able to resolve the contradictions of the Book of Ezekiel. Some sources identify this story with his son, Eleazar ben Hananiah. The Talmud sums up the matter: "Rav Judah said in Rav's name: In truth, that man, Hananiah son of Hezekiah by name, is to be remembered for blessing. If it were not him, the Book of Ezekiel would have been hidden."

The Talmud attributes authorship of Megillat Taanit to Hananiah ben Hezekiah.

== See also ==
- Megillat Taanit
