= Abraham ben Joseph ha-Levi =

Avraham ben Yosef HaLevi Segal (c. 1620 – c. 1670) was a Polish commentator born in Kraków. In consequence of the persecution of the Jews of Poland by the Cossacks in 1656, he fled from his native city and sought asylum in Hamburg. There he wrote a commentary on Megillat Taanit, which was printed in Amsterdam, in 1659, and went through several editions. His work, however, was not favorably received by his contemporaries, for both Efraim Cohen, author of Sha'ar Efraim, a collection of rabbinical decisions, and Abraham Gombiner, author of Magen Avraham, refer to him somewhat disparagingly.

He died, probably in Hamburg, about 1670, or at least some time after 1659.
