= Ari L. Goldman =

American journalist (born 1949)

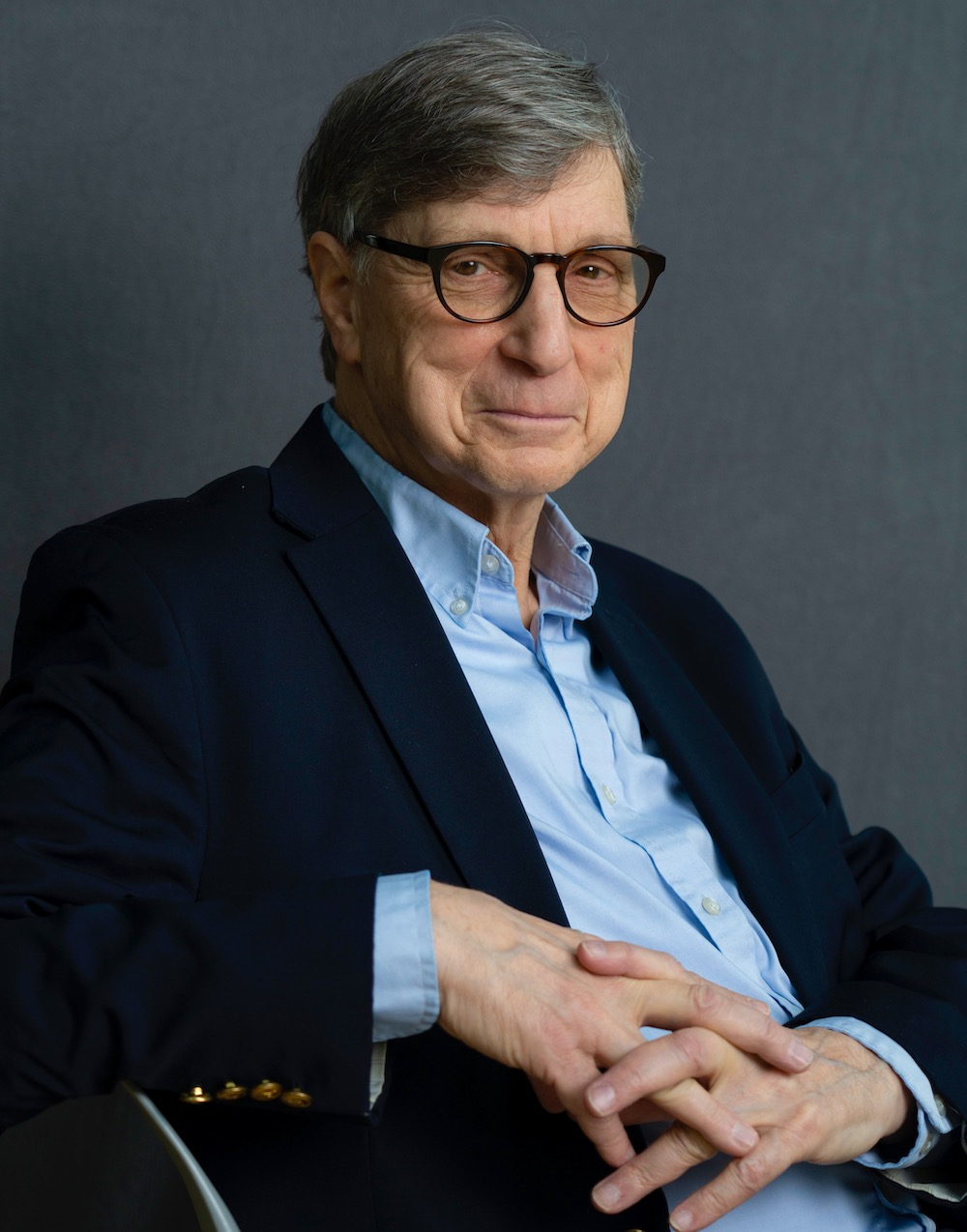
- Ari L. Goldman in 2021
- Born: September 22, 1949 (age 77); Hartford, Connecticut
- Education: Yeshiva University
- Occupations: Journalist, Professor, Author
- Known for: Religious Journalism

Ari L. Goldman (born September 22, 1949) is an American journalist. He was a professor of journalism at Columbia University and a former reporter for The New York Times.

== Early life and education ==
Goldman was born in Hartford, Connecticut. He attended the Rabbi Jacob Joseph School on the Lower East Side of Manhattan. He was educated at Yeshiva University, Columbia and Harvard.

== Career ==
Goldman was a tenured professor at Columbia, where he directed the Scripps Howard Program on Religion, Journalism and the Spiritual Life. The program had enabled him to take his "Covering Religion" seminar on study tours of Israel, Ireland, Italy, Russia and India. His former students have gone on to be religion writers at such papers as the Chicago Tribune, the Miami Herald, The Baltimore Sun and the Raleigh News & Observer. He taught for over 30 years before retiring in 2024.

Goldman has been a Fulbright Professor in Israel, a Skirball Fellow at Oxford University in England and a scholar-in-residence at Stern College for Women.

He spent 20 years of his career at New York Times from 1975 to 1993, most of it as a religion writer. He still continues to contribute occasional articles and reviews.

Goldman is a founding faculty member of the School of the New York Times, a high school program started in 2016 for students interested in journalism. He teaches the course "Writing the Big City: Covering New York." He has also been a lecturer for Times Journeys.

Goldman is a founding board member of Shtetl, a media outlet covering the Haredi Jewish community that launched in 2023.

== Personal life ==
Goldman is a Modern Orthodox Jew. He and his wife, Shira Dicker, are the parents of three children and live in New York City.

== Awards ==
2020- William A. Reed Lifetime Achievement Award (Religion News Association) in recognition of his exceptional commitment to the field of religion newswriting.

== Books ==
- The Search for God at Harvard (1991)
- Being Jewish (2000)
- Living A Year of Kaddish (2003)
- The Late Starters Orchestra (2014)
