= Aristobulus III of Judea =

Last ruler of the Hasmonean dynasty (53-36 BC)

High Priest of Judaea
- Reign: 36 BCE
- Predecessor: Ananelus
- Successor: Ananelus
- Born: 53 BCE
- Died: 36 BCE
- Dynasty: Hasmonean
- Mother: Alexandra the Maccabee
- Religion: Judaism

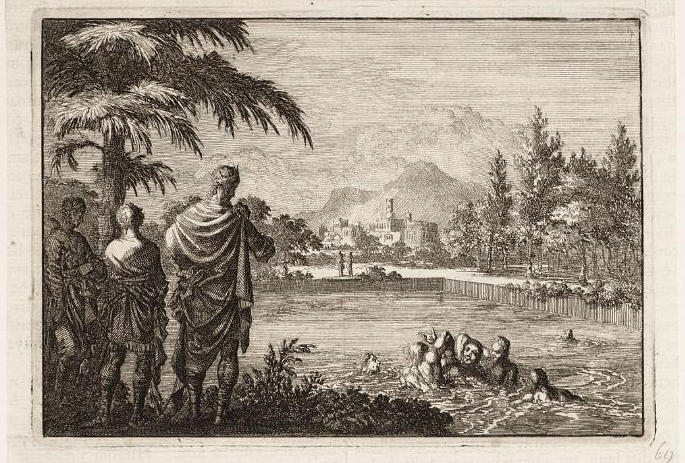
Aristobulus III drowned by Herod's men, etching by Jan Luyken, 1704, Amsterdam Museum.

Hasmonean dynasty family tree

Aristobulus III (53–36 BCE) was the last scion of the Hasmonean royal house, brother of Herod the Great's wife Mariamne, and grandson of Hyrcanus II and Aristobulus II. He was a favourite of the people on account of his noble descent and handsome presence, and thus became an object of fear to Herod, who at first sought to ignore him entirely by debarring him from the high priesthood. But his mother Alexandra, through intercession with Cleopatra and Mark Antony, compelled Herod to remove Ananelus from the office of high priest and appoint Aristobulus instead.

To secure himself against danger from Aristobulus, Herod instituted a system of espionage against him and his mother. This surveillance proved so onerous that they sought to gain their freedom by taking refuge with Cleopatra. As told by the Roman Jewish historian Josephus, their plans were betrayed, and the disclosure had the effect of greatly increasing Herod's suspicions against his brother-in-law. As Herod dared not resort to open violence, he caused him to be drowned while he was bathing in a pool in Jericho during a banquet organized by Alexandra.

== See also ==
- Hasmonean coinage

Aristobulus III of Judea Hasmonean Died: 36 BC
Jewish titles
Preceded by Ananelus	High Priest of Jerusalem; 36 BC	Succeeded by Ananelus
