= Amarkol =

Hebrew title applied to a Temple trustee superintending the cashiers

Amarkol (Hebrew: אמרכל; plural, אמרכלים, amarkolim), is a title applied to a trustee of the Temple in Jerusalem superintending the cashiers (gizbarim). While the three – or, according to the Baraita, thirteen – cashiers handled all the money that flowed into the Temple treasury, "the amarkolim, seven in number, held the seven keys to the seven gates of the Temple hall (azara), none opening his gate before all the others had assembled". Above the seven amarkolim were two catholici, and these again were under the supervision of the high priest.

Abba Saul ben Batnit, in his attack against the priestly house of Ishmael ben Fabus, said: "They themselves are high priests, and their sons gizbarim, and their sons-in-law amarkolim". Eleazar, the "chief over the chiefs of the Levites", is given the title of amarkol. Eliakim, son of Hilkiah, as keeper of the keys of the Temple is also called amarkol, and Jeremiah is represented as a descendant of the amarkolim, who had their inheritance in Anathoth. In addition, יוצר in Zechariah 11:13 (Authorized Version, the potter) is translated in Targum Jonathan, amarkol, meaning treasurer. Adolf Büchler has shown by referring to Josephus, Against Apion 2:8, that certain Temple officers handed the keys of the Temple to their successors each day, as a symbol of their charge — and these were none others than the amarkolim; who were, however, laymen and not priests. And it was in view of this that the title of amarkol was applied to them.

In Targum Onkelos, Targum Jonathan, and Targum Pseudo-Jonathan, the title of amarkol is applied to nesiim (princes) and to shomere ha-saf (the doorkeepers), in accordance with Jerusalem Talmud Shekalim Chapter 5, Numbers Rabbah Chapter 3, and Leviticus Rabbah Chapter 5.

== Etymology ==
According to The Jewish Encyclopedia, the word is from the Persian amarkir or Armenian hamarakar, meaning "master of finance".

Alternative etymologies are given by Rabbi Judah as a contraction of mar kol ("master over all"), and by Rav Chisda as a contraction of amar kulla ("he who has everything to say").
