= Abba Kohen Bardela =

Jewish scholar

Abba Cohen of Bardela, most commonly known as Abba Kohen Bardela, was a Jewish scholar of the last tannaitic generation (about the beginning of the third century). The few halakhot emanating from him refer to the rabbinical civil law. In Biblical homiletics several of his expositions have been preserved. The last-mentioned passage runs as follows: "Woe to mankind, because of the day of judgment; woe, because of the day of trial! Balaam, the wisest among the Gentiles, was confounded at the reproof of his ass. Joseph, one of the youngest of Jacob's sons, silenced his elder brethren. How will man be able to endure the judgment of the omniscient Lord?"

Abba Jose ben Hanan transmitted one of his aggadahs.
