= Joshua ben Sie =

High Priest of Israel at the end of the 1st century BC

Joshua ben Sie, also commonly known as Jesus ben Sie, was a Jewish High Priest of Israel at the end of the 1st century BC. He replaced Eleazar ben Boethus from 3 BC.

Preceded by Eleazar ben Boethus	High Priest of Israel; 3BC-?	Succeeded by Joazar ben Boethus
