= Jesus, son of Fabus =

1st century BCE Jewish High priest

Jesus, son of Fabus, also known as Jesus, son of Phabet, Jesus son of Phiabi or Joshua ben Fabus (Hebrew: יהושע בר פיאבי), was a Jewish High priest (c. 30 – 23 BCE) in the 1st century BCE.

He succeeded Ananelus and was removed by Herod when he appointed his father-in-law, Simon ben Boethus, to the high-priesthood.

Jewish titles
Preceded by Ananelus	High Priest of Israel; 30 BCE – 23 BCE	Succeeded by Simon son of Boethus
