= Dianne Cohler-Esses =

Syrian Jewish American Rabbi

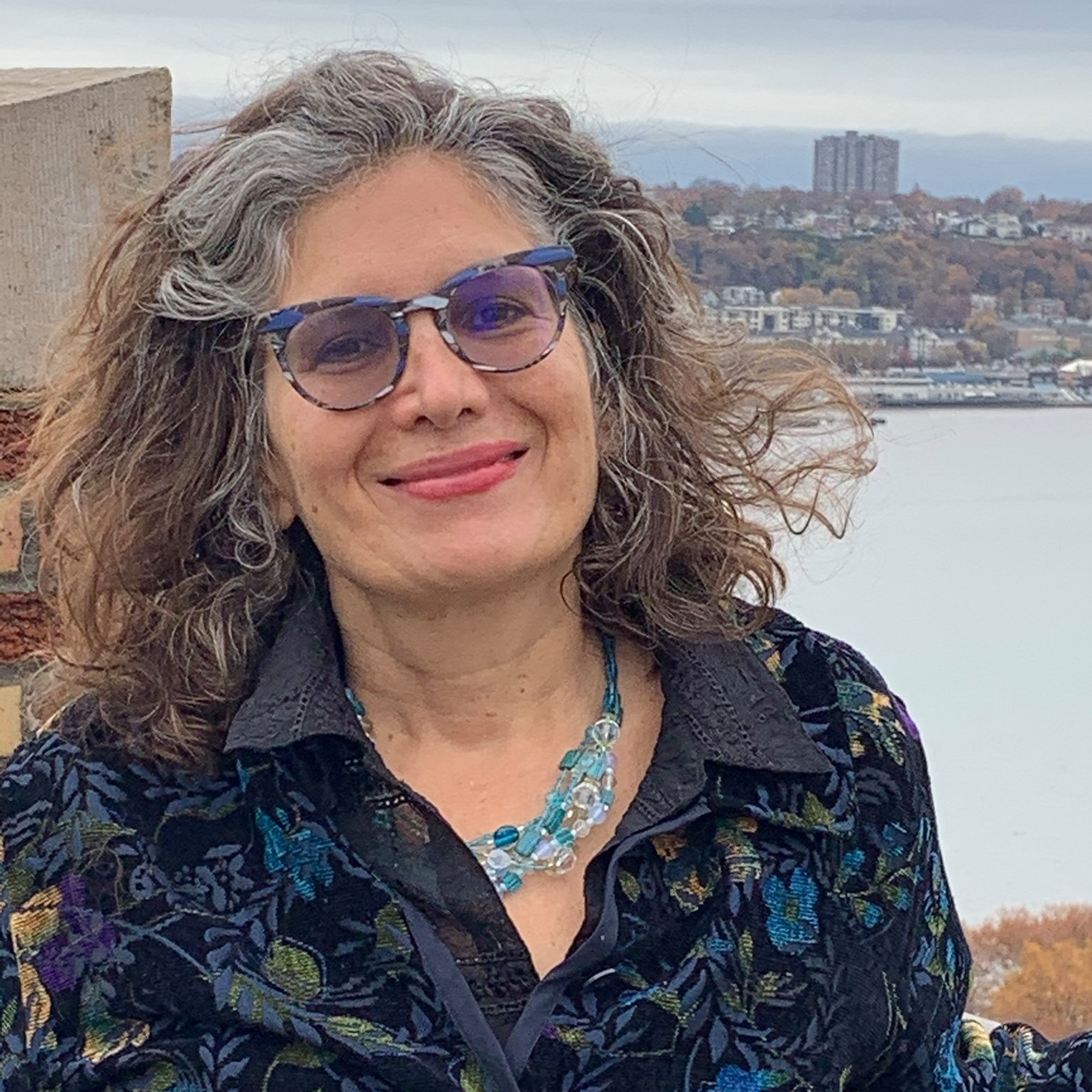

Dianne Cohler-Esses grew up in Brooklyn, New York and is the first Syrian-Jewish woman to become a rabbi. She was ordained by the Jewish Theological Seminary in 1995. She is a leader in Jewish education and has worked with many institutions including the National Jewish Center for Learning and Leadership, the Bronfman youth fellowships, the Curriculum Initiative, and the UJA Federation. In 2012, she took on the position of Director of Lifelong Learning at Romemu, a Renewal Congregation on the Upper West Side of Manhattan.. Amongst her achievements is her role as lead educator in the Open Book program - a hybrid in-person and virtual weekly class attended by participants from around the globe.

In 2025 Cohler-Esses was the recipient of the prestigious Covenant Award for Jewish education. According to the Covenant Foundation: "Rabbi Cohler-Esses’ work as an adult educator also extends well beyond Romemu. She co-teaches the Artists’ Beit Midrash Skirball Academy class at The Temple Emanu-El Streicker Cultural Center and teaches Torah to lay leaders through the UJA-Federation of New York. She is also an adjunct faculty member at the Academy for Jewish Religion and she has been a bold leader in creating chesed programs that inform and inspire the community on topics including Judaism and disabilities and issues relevant to Jewish women." Ilana Trachtman, Director and Producer of Praying with Lior, produced a video portrait of Cohler-Esses for the Covenenant Foundation in 2025

She is married to Larry Cohler-Esses, with whom she has three children: Ayelet, Elichai, and Shira. She lives in New York City on the Upper West Side.

The 2022 art exhibit “Holy Sparks”, shown among other places at the Dr. Bernard Heller Museum, featured art about twenty-four female rabbis who were firsts in some way; Siona Benjamin created the artwork about Cohler-Esses that was in that exhibit.

== See also ==
- Timeline of women rabbis
