= Larry Cohler-Esses =

American journalist and political writer

Larry Cohler-Esses is an American journalist and political writer. He has worked for the Jewish magazine The Forward. He is married to Dianne Cohler-Esses.

== Career ==
He joined the staff of The Forward in December 2008. Previously, he served as Editor-at-Large for The Jewish Week, an investigative reporter for the New York Daily News, and as a staff writer for The Jewish Week as well as the Washington Jewish Week. He has written extensively on the Arab-Jewish relations both in the United States and the Middle East. Cohler-Esses is a founding board member of Shtetl, a media outlet covering the Haredi Jewish community that launched in 2023.

== Trip to Iran ==
In August 2015, The Forward received wide attention for reporting from Iran at a charged moment in American politics, as the U.S. Congress was ramping up to a vote on an accord reached the month before to limit Tehran's nuclear ability in return for lifting international oil and financial sanctions. Larry Cohler-Esses was, in the words of The New York Times, "The first journalist from an American Jewish pro-Israel publication to be given an Iranian visa since 1979".

== Awards ==
He received several Laurels Awards from the Columbia Journalism Review, and two New York Press Association awards. The subject along with Lili Bayer won the Society of Professional Journalists 2018 Phi Sigma Chi award for non-daily investigative reporting on former White House anti-terrorism aide, Sebastian Gorka.

== See also ==
- Orly Azoulay
- Annika Hernroth-Rothstein
