= Hanina ben Antigonus =

Hanina (Hananiah) ben Antigonus (Hebrew: חנינא בן אנטיגונוס, Chanina ben [son of] Antigonus) was Jewish rabbi of the third generation of tannaim.

He was of priestly descent, and a contemporary of Rabbi Akiva and Rabbi Yishmael.

It is supposed that in his youth he had witnessed the service of the Temple of Jerusalem, since he knew the flutters that played before the altar. If this were so, Ḥanina must have enjoyed unusual longevity, as he often appears in halakic controversy with Akiva's latest disciples. Be this as it may, he was learned in the laws relating to the priests, and many such laws are preserved in his name, while precedents reported by him regarding the services and appurtenances of the Temple influenced later rabbinical opinions.

He is often cited as an authority on marital questions and on other matters. Some halakhic midrashim also have come down from him.

Just one aggadah is recorded under his name:

- Whosoever practises the precept concerning the fringes on the borders [kanfei] of garments will realize the promise: 'Ten men . . . shall take hold of the skirt [bekanaf] of him that is a Jew, saying, We will go with you: for we have heard that God is with you'. On the other hand, he who violates the precept concerning the skirt [kanaf] is included in the verse 'take hold of the ends of [bekanaf] the earth, that the wicked might be shaken out of it'

According to him, when an aged man dies after not more than three days' sickness, his death may be termed kareth, a punishment for secret violations of the Sabbath or of the dietary laws.
