= Boethusians =

Jewish sect related to the Sadducees

The Boethusians (Hebrew: בַיְּתּוֹסִים, romanized: Ḇayyətōsīm) were a Jewish sect closely related to, if not a development of, the Sadducees.

== Origins according to the Talmud ==
The post-Talmudic work Avot of Rabbi Natan gives the following origin of the schism between the Pharisees and Sadducees/Boethusians: Antigonus of Sokho having taught the maxim, "Be not like the servants who serve their masters for the sake of the wages, but be rather like those who serve without thought of receiving wages", his two pupils, Zadok and Boethus, repeated this maxim to their pupils. In the course of time, either the two teachers or their pupils understood this to express the stance that there was neither an afterlife nor a resurrection of the dead, and founded the sects of the Sadducees and the Boethusians. They lived in luxurious splendor; using silver and golden vessels all their lives, not because they were haughty, but because (as they claimed) the Pharisees led a hard life on earth and yet would have nothing to show for it in the world to come. It is known to historians that these two groups denied the immortality of the soul and the resurrection, and also that the sects found their followers chiefly among the wealthy, but the origin of the sects is unconfirmed.

The Mishnah, as well as the Baraita, mentions the Boethusians as saying that the omer offering must be offered on the Sunday of Passover (in opposition to the Pharisees who offered it on the second day of Passover), resulting in different dates for the Shavuot holiday. Elsewhere, it is narrated that the Boethusians hired false witnesses in order to mislead the Pharisees in their calculation of the new moon. Another point of dispute between the Boethusians and the Pharisees was whether the high priest should prepare the incense inside or outside the Holy of Holies on Yom Kippur

As the beginnings of this sect are shrouded in obscurity, so also is the length of its duration. The Talmud mentions a Boethusian in a dispute with a pupil of Rabbi Akiva, yet it is likely that the word here means simply a sectarian, a heretic, just as the term "Sadducee" was used in a much wider sense later on. A Boethus, son of Zonim, and nearly contemporaneous with Rabbi Akiva is mentioned in the Mishnah; he was not, however, a Boethusian, but a pious merchant. An amora, c. 300 CE, was also called "Boethus".

== Relationship to other groups ==
Some scholars have identified the Boethusians with the Essenes, the sect that produced the Dead Sea Scrolls. Some of the scrolls express views similar to those attributed to the Boethusians by the Talmud. According to this theory, the word "Boethusian" is a corruption of "Beit Essaya", meaning "House of Essenes".

== A high-priestly family ==
The Boethusians are believed to have been associated with the members of the high-priestly family of Boethus. The family of Boethus produced the following high priests:

- Simon, son of Boethus from Alexandria, was made a high priest about 25 BCE by Herod the Great, in order that his marriage with Boethus's daughter, Mariamne, might not be regarded as a mésalliance, a marriage with a person thought to be unsuitable or of a lower social position.
- Joazar, son of Simon Boethus (4 BCE and before 6 CE), unpopular and an advocate of compliance with the Census of Quirinius

Jewish titles
Preceded by Matthias ben Theophilus	High Priest of Israel; 4 BCE	Succeeded by Eleazar ben Boethus
Preceded by Joshua ben Sie	High Priest of Israel ? – 6 CE	Succeeded by Annas

- Eleazar, son of Simon Boethus (4–3 BCE) independently attested in the Mandaean Book of John.

Jewish titles
Preceded by Joazar ben Boethus	High Priest of Israel; 4–3 BCE	Succeeded by Joshua ben Sie

- Simon Cantheras, son of Simon Boethus (41–42 CE)

Jewish titles
Preceded by Theophilus ben Ananus	High Priest of Israel; 41–43 CE	Succeeded by Matthias ben Ananus

- Elioneus, son of Simon Cantheras

Jewish titles
Preceded by Matthias ben Ananus	High Priest of Israel; 43-44 CE	Succeeded by Jonathan ben Ananus

- Joshua ben Gamla (64 CE), whose wife Martha, daughter of Simon Boethus, belonged to the house

The hatred of the Pharisees toward this high-priestly family is shown by the words of the tanna Abba Saul ben Batnit, who lived about the year 40 CE at Jerusalem. "The house of Boethus" heads the list of the wicked and sinful priestly families enumerated by Abba.
