= Martha daughter of Boethus =

1st century CE Jewish woman who lived in Jerusalem

Martha daughter of Boethus (Hebrew: מרתא בת ביתוס; d. 70 CE), in the Mishnah and Babylonian Talmud, was one of the richest women in Jerusalem in the period prior to the destruction of the Second Temple in 70 C.E.

Martha's patronym suggests a link to the Boethusians, an influential clan of priests. After her first husband died, she became engaged to Joshua ben Gamla, who served as High Priest about 64–65. Rav Assi said that she paid King Jannai (whom scholars identify with Herod Agrippa II) a quantity of money equal in size to 72 eggs to appoint Joshua as High Priest, even though the Sanhedrin had not elected him to the post. Even though the High priest was forbidden from marrying a widow, the couple went on to marry, and the Mishnah cites the event for the proposition that a priest who betroths a widow and subsequently becomes high priest may consummate the marriage.

It was said of Martha's son, who was a priest, that he was so strong that he could carry up to the altar two sides of a huge ox without any lack of decorum.

The Talmud recounts the story of her last day during the Siege of Jerusalem (70 CE). At that time, Martha sent her manservant out to bring her some fine flour, but it had sold out. After that, the manservant is repeatedly sent out to buy the next-lesser quality of flour (white flour - dark flour - barley flour) only to find it sold out as well. Finally, the desperate woman went out to see if she could find anything to eat without even putting on her shoes, but stepping in some dung, she died of shock. According to Rashi, the reason for her death was the feeling of extreme disgust that gripped her until she died because of her delicacy. Rabban Yochanan ben Zakai thus applied to her the Biblical verse, "The tender and delicate woman among you who would not adventure to set the sole of her foot upon the ground." (Deut. 28:56.) The second opinion holds that, while walking down the street, she saw figs on the floor, and began to eat, and died. These figs were those of Rabbi Zadok, who fasted for 40 years so that Jerusalem would not be destroyed by the Romans and when he wanted to restore himself, they used to bring him a fig, and he used to suck the juice and throw the rest away. Martha felt in these figs that he sucked them because of his sickness, you tasted his sickness and because she did get sick and soon after died. When Martha was about to die, she brought out all her gold and silver and threw it in the street, saying, "What is the good of this to me", thus giving effect to the verse, "They shall cast their silver in the streets" (Ezekiel 7:19).
