= Young Advocates for Fair Education =

American advocacy group

Yaffed
- Young Advocates for Fair Education
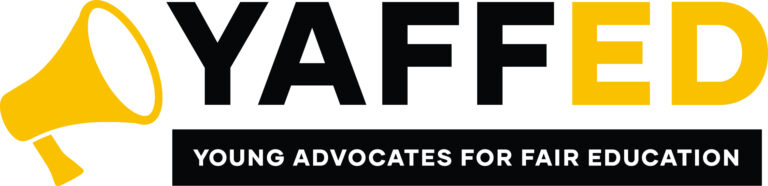
- Formation: 2012; 14 years ago
- Founder: Naftuli Moster
- Type: Nonprofit
- Headquarters: New York
- Services: Advocacy for improved secular education in New York's Hasidic schools
- Executive Director: Adina Mermelstein Konikoff
- Website: https://yaffed.org

Young Advocates for Fair Education (styled Yaffed) is an advocacy group dedicated to improving secular education in Haredi Jewish (especially Hasidic) schools. The group advocates for curricular changes within schools, in compliance with New York State law.

== Members ==
Yaffed was founded in 2012 by Naftuli Moster, a former member of Brooklyn's Belz Hasidic community. Moster grew up in Borough Park, Brooklyn, one of 17 children in a Hasidic family. Yiddish was his first language. He attended a yeshiva in Borough Park where secular studies were almost non-existent.

In 2022 Moster resigned and Beatrice Weber replaced him as Executive Director, later moving to a role of Senior Adviser. Weber has a bachelor's degree in psychology from Touro College. Like Moster, Weber was raised in a Hasidic community, with a modicum of secular education. She is divorced from her Hasidic husband, with whom she had ten children. As of December 2022, her children all still attended Hasidic schools, including Yeshiva Mesivta Arugath Habosem in Williamsburg, Brooklyn, which she successfully sued over its education system.

In June 2024, Adina Mermelstein Konikoff was promoted to Interim Executive Director, and tool on the role fully in November, replacing Weber. Konikoff was previously the organization's Director of Development.

In June 2025, Moster announced that he regretted both Shtetl (a news site founded to provide accountability in Orthodox Jewish communities) and Yaffed after growing distrustful of progressive politics after the October 7 attacks and due to his concern that his advocacy had negatively impacted family in the Haredi community. In response, all three of Shtetl's board members resigned.

== Mission ==
Yaffed's stated aim is to improve educational curricula within ultra-Orthodox schools, in compliance with New York State Law. They work to raise awareness about the importance of general studies education, and encourage elected officials, Department of Education officials, and the leadership of the ultra-Orthodox world to act responsibly in preparing their youth for economic sufficiency, and for broad access to the resources of the modern world. Their stated mission is to ensure that all students receive the critical tools and skillsets needed for long-term personal growth and self-sufficient futures.

Under New York state law, private schools, including yeshivas, are required to provide curricula that are "substantially equivalent" to those provided in the public schools. According to The Jewish Week, while public schools are required to provide at least five hours of education per day, many Hasidic yeshivas only provide 90 minutes of secular education per day to boys, and no secular education to them at all after the age of about 13.

According to Moster, Yaffed's strategy has been "to get people from within the Hasidic community to speak up and demand a change in the current education system, where 14-year-olds spend 14 hours a day without learning a single word of English, math, science, history, or geography".

The Jerusalem Post has noted that Yaffed is one of several Jewish activist organizations around the globe, including Israel, the U.S., U.K., Canada, and Belgium, who are working towards having Hasidic yeshivas meet the general standards of secular education.

== Activities ==
Yaffed has advertised its mission by use of billboard advertisements and social media campaigns. One billboard quoted a Mishnaic source, alongside the message: "It's your mitzvah. It's the law."

Yaffed is currently exploring legal avenues through which to pressure schools to improve secular education.

In the summer of 2015, Yaffed organized a letter writing campaign directed at district superintendents and the New York State Education Department, to inform them of serious concerns regarding the education in numerous Hasidic yeshivas. The Department of Education subsequently announced an investigation into the matter.

Yaffed has stated that if it does not receive an adequate response from the local government, it will explore taking the matter to civil court. Yaffed is seeking to represent parents from within the communities who have children currently enrolled in the schools. According to the Jewish Week, a spokesman for Attorney General Eric Schneiderman declined to comment because the issue might "be the subject of future litigation". The New York State Education Department referred the matter to the New York City Department of Education.

The NYC Department of Education (DOE) announced, in 2015, that it would investigate allegations that nearly 40 ultra-Orthodox Jewish schools, or yeshivas, in New York City were failing to meet state education requirements. But nine months later, the DOE refused to provide any evidence that the investigation had actually begun. Thereafter, Yaffed began an "evidence drive" collecting materials from "yeshiva graduates of Hasidic yeshivas and parents of current yeshiva students" that would demonstrate whether Hasidic schools in New York are meeting state-mandated secular education requirements. Yaffed states that it has already collected such materials as textbooks with certain subjects "blacked out", and report cards for boys of high school age that listed, "no secular subjects at all". The investigation was still ongoing in August 2018, stymied by the refusal of half of the yeshivas under investigation to allow DOE investigators entry. Richard Carranza, the New York City schools chancellor, promised that "appropriate follow-up action" would be undertaken.

In April 2018, a bill was passed, pushed through the state legislature by state Sen. Simcha Felder, a Democrat who has caucused with Republicans, that puts ultra-Orthodox yeshivas under the authority of the state, rather than local education officials, called the Felder amendment. In July 2018, Yaffed filed a federal lawsuit against Democratic Gov. Andrew Cuomo and state education officials over the Felder amendment, claiming that the Felder Amendment violated the Establishment Clause of the First Amendment by giving special treatment to yeshivos, and also guaranteeing that one of the metropolitan area's fastest-growing student populations will continue to receive "a sub-standard secular education". Yaffed argued that it was unconstitutional for the New York City and State Education Departments to credit yeshivos for the learning that takes place during the limudei kodesh portion of the school day.

In November 2018, the state education department released new guidelines on the substantial equivalency rule, under what all private schools, including religious schools, are supposed to be inspected by local public school authorities every five years.

In January 2019, U.S. District Judge Leo Glasser has dismissed Yaffed's lawsuit over the so-called Felder amendment, ruling that the group lacks standing to sue over it.

Glasser implied in his ruling that the new state guidelines might render the group's lawsuit moot. He said that under the new guidelines, the schools covered by the Felder amendment will be required to comply with "all of the same curriculum and hour requirements applicable to other private schools", and will face additional requirements related to the religious portion of the schools' curriculum.

Moster said he disagreed. "The revised guidelines embody the separate and preferential treatment of ultra-Orthodox yeshivas, regardless of how the leaders of those schools feel about the guidelines", Moster said in a statement. He said the group will press forward "in reforming the unjust system".

The pro-yeshiva group, "Parents for Educational and Religious Liberty in Schools (PEARLS)", said it applauded Glasser's decision. "Yaffed's campaign of harassment of the yeshivas must end", the group said in a statement.

== Community response ==
For many in the Haredi Jewish community, Yaffed is viewed negatively because it works outside of the religious community's power structure. Ami Magazine, an ultra-Orthodox weekly magazine published internationally, apologized for publishing a Yaffed advertisement.

The Jewish Week reported that the major Haredi umbrella organizations, as well as some local yeshivas, have declined to comment on the issue. The paper interviewed local community members in support of the organization's efforts, but those interviewed spoke on condition of anonymity, for fear of community backlash.

The members in the Hasidic community have publicly responded to Yaffed by outlining their concerns over the effects on religious Jewish education by government intervention. Additionally, community members expressed concern over additional costs being placed on yeshivas and parents, and have pointed to failings of the public school system, rather than yeshiva education requirements, as being more of a concern for government.

Yaffed has responded by pointing out the degree to which critics agree that the lack of secular education in Hasidic schools is seriously challenging the funding argument.

== See also ==
- Hasidic education controversy (New York)
- Naftuli Moster
- Haredi Judaism
- Yeshiva
- Jewish education
- Religious education
- Torah Judaism
- Freedom of education
- Private school
- Independent school
- Torah Umesorah – National Society for Hebrew Day Schools
