= Joshua ben Gamla =

1st century CE Jewish High Priest

Joshua ben Gamla (Hebrew: יהושע בן גמלא), also called Jesus the son of Gamala (Greek: Ἰησοῦς υἱὸς Γαμάλα), was a Jewish high priest in about 64–65 CE. He was killed during the First Jewish–Roman War. While the Talmud refers to Joshua ben Gamla, the earlier Greek works of Josephus Flavius call him Γαμάλα μὲν υἱὸς Ἰησοῦς (Gamala men huios Iesous) a semitism for: The son of Gamala, Jesus.

Joshua married the rich widow Martha of the high-priestly family Boethus and was appointed High Priest by Herod Agrippa II. According to Talmudic sources, Martha bribed a "King Jannai" into appointing Joshua High Priest with a tarkab of denarii. This cannot refer to Alexander Jannaeus, who reigned 150 years earlier and was himself the High Priest, but may refer to King Agrippa II as is mentioned in the Talmudic notes. The two lots used on Yom Kippur, previously of boxwood, he made of gold. Joshua did not remain long in office, being forced, after a year, to give way to Mattathias ben Theophilus.

Although Joshua was not a scholar, he cared for the instruction of the young and provided schools in every town for children over five years of age, earning thereby the praises of posterity. The Talmud states, "Joshua b. Gamala came and ordained that teachers of young children should be appointed in each district and each town, and that children should enter school at the age of six or seven.". He is therefore regarded as the founder of the institution of formal Jewish education.

Although no longer High Priest, Joshua remained one of the leaders of Jerusalem. Together with another former high priest, Ananus ben Ananus, and other prominent men, he unsuccessfully opposed the election of Phinehas b. Samuel (68) as high priest. Josephus reports that Joshua was an "intimate friend", who reported a plot to replace Josephus as general of Galilee to Josephus' father. Because his father wrote to him of the plot, Josephus was able to resist it.

Joshua attempted peaceably to prevent the Idumeans from entering Jerusalem during the Zealot coup. After they came into possession of the city, they killed both Joshua and Ananus as traitors to their country (68).

== Identification ==
Scholars have argued that Joshua ben Gamla of the Talmud is the same high priest from the days of the destruction, and that the priesthood was acquired from Herod Agrippa II.

Jewish titles
Preceded by Jesus son of Damneus	High Priest of Israel c.64—65	Succeeded by Mattathias ben Theophilus
