= Naftuli Moster =

American social activist

- Born: 1986 (age 39–40)
- Occupation: Executive Director of Yaffed
- Known for: Activism
- Spouse: Miriam Lipsius

Naftuli Moster (born 1986) is an American activist. He is the founder and former executive director of Young Advocates for Fair Education (Yaffed), an advocacy organization dedicated to ensuring that students at Hasidic yeshivas in New York City be given a secular education. Moster was named in 2015 as one of the "Forward 50", in recognition of the impact in Jewish social activism and leadership.

== Early life and education ==
Moster grew up in Borough Park, Brooklyn, one of 17 children in a Yiddish-speaking Hasidic family. He attended a Belz yeshiva where secular studies were limited. After his yeshiva studies, Moster attended Touro College, and then CUNY's College of Staten Island. He earned a Master of Social Work degree at the Silberman School of Social Work at Hunter College in 2015. His education in his yeshiva focused mostly on religious studies, causing him several challenges applying for, and studying at, college.

== Career ==
While studying for his degree in social work, Moster founded Yaffed. He served as President of the organization from 2012 to 2016 and is currently executive director. Concerned that many other students in the ultra-Orthodox community might struggle, as he did, in trying to apply to college and learn skills that would enable them to make a living, Moster founded the non-profit organization, with the aim of ensuring that ultra-Orthodox students in private schools receive the secular education mandated by the State of New York. Public education organizations and staff are often unaware of their responsibilities to students at private and religious schools. Moster discussed the problem of secular education with New York superintendents who have large Hasidic communities in their district. Through Yaffed, Moster is also hoping to raise the awareness of ultra-Orthodox educational needs in the Jewish community. The mission is to ensure that all students acquire the knowledge and skills necessary to earn a livelihood and to allow personal growth.

In June 2022, a New York State Supreme Court justice ruled in favor of an Orthodox Jewish mother YAFFED had assisted in registering a complaint against a Brooklyn yeshiva. The judge ordered New York's’s Department of Education to complete its investigation into the yeshiva that had extended for several years. On June 17, 2022, Moster announced that he will resign his post at Yaffed on September 30, 2022.

Moster is also a public speaker, on radio and at public events such as Limmud, and on panel at a screening of director Joe Kolman's film An Unorthodox Education.

In an interview with The Jewish Daily Forward, Moster noted that his approach to community organizing is not the traditional one. His style is "to get to those people who do believe in education, and enable them to speak up and ask their leaders to make some changes so their children can have a better future". When publications in the insular community refused to publish information, Moster is willing to take a more direct approach, pursuing letter writing campaigns and direct billboards.

In 2025, he publicly expressed regret for some of his past actions as an activist, and announced he had personally returned to Orthodox Jewish observance.

== Personal life ==
Moster married Miriam Lipsius on August 1, 2013. She is a writer who received her MFA from Hunter College, where she has taught creative writing.

== See also ==
- New York Hasidic education controversy
