= Sadducees =

Jewish sect or group active in Judea from 2nd century BCE to 1st century CE

Sadducees צְדוּקִים
- Historical leaders: John Hyrcanus; Alexander Jannaeus; Aristobulus II
- Founded: 167 BCE
- Dissolved: 73 CE
- Headquarters: Jerusalem
- Ideology: Aristocracy; Elitism; Hellenization; Written Torah
- Religion: Hellenistic Judaism

The Sadducees (/ˈsædjəsiːz/; Hebrew: צְדוּקִים, romanized: Ṣəḏūqīm, lit. 'Zadokites') were a sect of Jews active in Judea during the Second Temple period, from the second century BCE to the destruction of the Second Temple in 70 CE. The Sadducees are described in contemporary literary sources in contrast to the two other major sects at the time, the Pharisees and the Essenes.

Josephus, writing at the end of the 1st century CE, associates the sect with the upper echelons of Judean society. As a whole, they fulfilled various political, social, and religious roles, including maintaining the Temple in Jerusalem. The group became extinct sometime after the destruction of the Second Temple in 70 CE.

== Etymology ==
The English term entered via Latin from Koine Greek: Σαδδουκαῖοι, romanized: Saddukaioi. The name Zadok is related to the root צָדַק, ṣāḏaq (to be right, just), which could be indicative of their aristocratic status in society in the initial period of their existence.

== History ==
According to Abraham Geiger, the Sadducee sect of Judaism derived their name from that of Zadok, the first High Priest of Israel to serve in Solomon's Temple. The leaders of the sect were proposed as the Kohanim (priests, the "Sons of Zadok", descendants of Eleazar, son of Aaron). The aggadic work Avot of Rabbi Natan tells the story of the two disciples of Antigonus of Sokho (3rd century BCE), Zadok and Boethus. Antigonus having taught the maxim, "Be not like the servants who serve their masters for the sake of the wages, but be rather like those who serve without thought of receiving wages", his students repeated this maxim to their students. Eventually, either the two teachers or their pupils understood this to express the belief that there was neither an afterlife nor a resurrection of the dead, and founded the Sadducee and Boethusian sects. They lived luxuriously, using silver and golden vessels, because (as they claimed) the Pharisees led a hard life on earth and yet would have nothing to show for it in the world to come. The two sects of the Sadducees and Boethusians are thus, in all later Rabbinic sources, always mentioned together, not only as being similar, but as originating at the same time. The use of gold and silver vessels perhaps argues against a priestly association for these groups, as priests at the time would typically use stone vessels, to prevent transmission of impurity.

Josephus mentioned in Antiquities of the Jews that "one Judas, a Gaulonite, of a city whose name was Gamala, who taking with him Sadduc, a Pharisee, became zealous to draw them to a revolt". Paul L. Maier suggests that the sect drew their name from the Sadduc mentioned by Josephus.

=== The Second Temple period ===
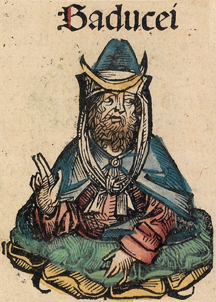
A Sadducee, illustrated in the 15th-century Nuremberg Chronicle

Throughout the Second Temple period (between the construction of the Second Temple in Jerusalem in 516 BCE and its destruction by the Romans in 70 CE following the siege of Jerusalem) Jerusalem saw several shifts in rule. In Achaemenid Judea (c. 539 BCE to c. 332 BCE), the Temple in Jerusalem became the center of worship in Judea. Its priests and attendants appear to have been powerful and influential in secular matters as well, a trend that would continue into the Hellenistic period.

This power and influence also brought accusations of corruption. Alexander's conquest of the Levant in 333 to 332 BCE brought an end to Achaemenid control of Jerusalem and ushered in the Hellenistic period, which saw the spread of Greek language, culture, and philosophical ideas, which intermixed with Judaism and led to Hellenistic Judaism.

After the death of Alexander the Great in 323 BCE, his generals divided the empire amongst themselves, and for the next 30 years they fought for control of territory. Judea was first controlled by Ptolemaic Egypt (r. 301–200 BCE) and later by the Seleucid Empire of Syria (r. 200 – 142 BCE). During this period, the High Priest of Israel was generally appointed with the direct approval of the Greek rulership, continuing the intermixing of religious politics with government. King Antiochus IV Epiphanes (r. 175 – 164 BCE) of the Seleucids began a persecution of traditional Jewish practices around 168–167 BCE, which set off a rebellion in Judea. The most successful rebels, led by the Hasmonean family in what became the Maccabean Revolt, eventually established the independent Hasmonean kingdom around 142 BCE. While no record of the Sadducees survives from this early period, many scholars presume that the later sects began to form during the Maccabean era (see Jewish sectarianism below). It is often speculated that the Sadducees grew out of the Judean religious élite in the early Hasmonean period, under rulers such as John Hyrcanus.

Hasmonean rule lasted until 63 BCE, when the Roman general Pompey conquered Jerusalem, at which point the Roman period of Judean history began. The province of Roman Judea was established in 6 CE (see also Syria Palaestina). While cooperation between the Romans and the Jews had been strongest during the reigns of Herod the Great (r. 37 – 4 BCE) and his grandson, Agrippa I (r. 41 – 44 CE), the Romans moved power out of the hands of vassal kings and into the hands of Roman administrators, beginning with the Census of Quirinius in 6 CE. The First Jewish–Roman War broke out in 66 CE. After a few years of conflict, the Romans retook Jerusalem and destroyed the temple, bringing an end to the Second Temple period in 70 CE.

=== After the Temple destruction ===
After the destruction of the Temple of Jerusalem in 70 CE, the Sadducees appear only in a few references in the Talmud and some Christian texts. In the beginning of Karaite Judaism, the followers of Anan ben David were called "Sadducees" and set a claim of the former being a historical continuity from the latter.

The Sadducee concept of the mortality of the soul is reflected on by Uriel da Costa, who mentions them in his writings.

== Role of the Sadducees ==
=== Religious ===
The religious responsibilities of the Sadducees included the maintenance of the Temple in Jerusalem. Their high social status was reinforced by their priestly responsibilities, as mandated in the Torah. The priests were responsible for performing sacrifices at the Temple, the primary method of worship in ancient Israel. This included presiding over sacrifices during the three festivals of pilgrimage to Jerusalem. Their religious beliefs and social status were mutually reinforcing, as the priesthood often represented the highest class in Judean society. However, Sadducees and the priests were not completely synonymous. Cohen writes that "not all priests, high priests, and aristocrats were Sadducees; many were Pharisees, and many were not members of any group at all."

=== Political ===
The Sadducees oversaw many formal affairs of the state. Members of the Sadducees:

- Administered the state domestically
- Represented the state internationally
- Participated in the Sanhedrin, and often encountered the Pharisees there.
- Collected taxes. These also came in the form of international tribute from Jews in the Diaspora.
- Equipped and led the army
- Regulated relations with the Roman Empire
- Mediated domestic grievances

== Beliefs ==
Knowledge about the beliefs of the Sadducees is limited by the fact that not a single line of their own writings has survived out of antiquity, as the destruction of Jerusalem and much of the Judean elite in 70 CE seems to have broken them. Extant writings on the Sadducees are often from sources hostile to them; Josephus was a rival Pharisee, Christian records were generally not sympathetic, and the rabbinic tradition (descended from the Pharisees) is uniformly hostile.

=== General ===
The Sadducees rejected the Oral Torah as proposed by the Pharisees. Rather, they saw the Written Torah as the sole source of divine authority. Later writings of the Pharisees criticized this belief as one that strengthened the Sadducees' own power.

According to Josephus, the Sadducees' beliefs included:

- Rejection of the idea of fate or of a pre-ordained future.
- God does not commit or even think evil.
- Man has free will; "man has the free choice of good or evil".
- The soul is not immortal and there is no afterlife, and no rewards or penalties after death.
- It is a virtue to debate and dispute with philosophy-teachers.

The Sadducees did not accept the idea of resurrection of the dead, but believed (contrary to the claim of Josephus) in the traditional Jewish concept of Sheol for those who had died. Josephus also includes a claim that the Sadducees are rude compared to loving and compassionate Pharisees, but this is generally considered more of a sectarian insult rather than an unbiased judgment of the Sadducees on their own terms. Similarly, Josephus brags that the Sadducees were often forced to back down if their judgments clashed with the Pharisees, as he says that the Pharisees were more popular with the multitude.

The Sadducees occasionally show up in the Christian gospels, but without much detail: usually merely as members of a list of opponents of Jesus. The Christian Acts of the Apostles contains somewhat more information:

- The Sadducees were associated with the party of the high priest of the era, and seem to have had a majority of the Sanhedrin, if not all (Gamaliel is a Pharisee member).
- The Sadducees did not believe in resurrection, whereas the Pharisees did. In Acts, Paul of Tarsus chose this point of division to attempt to gain the protection of the Pharisees (around 59 CE).
- The Sadducees may have rejected the notion of spirits or angels, whereas the Pharisees acknowledged them. This is based on Acts 23:8, which can be translated as either "For the Sadducees say that there is no resurrection, neither angel, nor spirit: but the Pharisees confess both", or as "For the Sadducees say there is no resurrection, neither as an angel nor as a spirit, while the Pharisees profess both"; the latter approach to the text has been advanced by theologian and scholar of religion David Bentley Hart.

=== Disputes with the Pharisees ===
- According to the Sadducees, spilt water becomes ritually impure through its pouring. The Pharisees denied that this was sufficient grounds for impurity in Mishnah Yadaim 4:7. Many Pharisee–Sadducee disputes revolved around issues of ritual purity.
- According to the Jewish laws of inheritance, the property of a deceased man is inherited by his sons. If the man had only daughters, his property would be inherited by his daughters upon his death, according to Numbers 27:8. When the deceased left no issue (offspring), the Sadducees, in dividing the inheritance among the relatives of the deceased, could hypothetically include his paternal aunt. The Sadducees would justify their practice a fortiori, an inference from minor to major premise, saying: "If the daughter of his son's son can inherit him (i.e., such as when her father left no male issue), is it not then fitting that his own daughter inherit him?!" (i.e., who is more closely related to him than his great-granddaughter), according to the Jerusalem Talmud (Baba Bathra 21b). The early Jewish sage Yohanan ben Zakkai argued against the Sadducees that the only reason the daughter was empowered to inherit her father was because her father left no male issue. However, a man's daughter – where there are sons, has no power to inherit her father's estate. Moreover, a deceased man who leaves no issue always has a distant male relative to whom his estate can be given. The Sadducees eventually agreed with the Pharisaic teaching. The vindication of Yohanan ben Zakkai and the Pharisees over the Sadducees gave rise to this date being held in honor in the Megillat Taanit according to the Rashbam in the Babylonian Talmud, Baba Bathra 115b–116a); Jerusalem Talmud (Baba Bathra 8:1 [21b–22a])
- The Sadducees demanded that a master pay for damages caused by his slave. The Pharisees imposed no such obligation, viewing that a slave could intentionally cause damage to see the liability for it brought on his master in Mishnah Yadaim 4:7
- The Pharisees posited that false witnesses should be executed if the verdict was pronounced based on their testimony—even if not yet carried out. The Sadducees argued that false witnesses should be executed only if the death penalty had already been carried out on the falsely accused in Mishnah Makot 1.6.

Later rabbinic literature took a dim view of both the Sadducees and Boethusians, not only due to their perceived carefree approach to keeping to the Torah and the Oral Torah but also due to their attempts to persuade the common folk to join their ranks according to Sifri to Deuteronomy (p. 233, Torah Ve'Hamitzvah edition). Maimonides viewed the Sadducees as rejecting the Oral Torah as an excuse to interpret the Written Torah in a lenient, personally convenient manner in his commentary to Pirkei Avot, 1.3.1 1:3. He described the Sadducees as "harming Israel and causing the nation to stray from following God" in the Mishneh Torah, Hilchoth Avodah Zarah 10:2.

== Jewish sectarianism ==
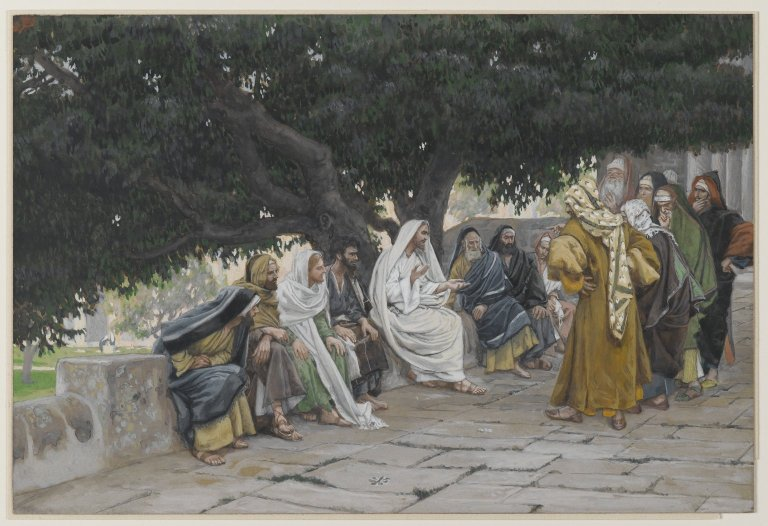
The Pharisees and the Sadducees Come to Tempt Jesus by James Tissot (Brooklyn Museum)

The Jewish community of the Second Temple period is often defined by its sectarian and fragmented attributes. Josephus, in Antiquities, contextualizes the Sadducees as opposed to the Pharisees and the Essenes. The Sadducees are also notably distinguishable from the growing Jesus movement, which later evolved into Christianity. These groups differed in their beliefs, social statuses, and sacred texts. Though the Sadducees produced no primary works themselves, their attributes can be derived from other contemporaneous texts, including the New Testament, the Dead Sea Scrolls, and later, the Mishnah and Talmud. Overall, the Sadducees represented an aristocratic, wealthy, and traditional elite within the hierarchy.

=== Opposition to the Essenes ===
The Dead Sea Scrolls, which are often attributed to the Essenes, suggest clashing ideologies and social positions between the Essenes and the Sadducees. In fact, some scholars suggest that the Essenes originated as a sect of Zadokites, which would indicate that the group itself had priestly, and thus Sadducaic origins. Within the Dead Sea Scrolls, the Sadducees are often referred to as Manasseh. The scrolls suggest that the Sadducees (Manasseh) and the Pharisees (Ephraim) became religious communities that were distinct from the Essenes, the true Judah. Clashes between the Essenes and the Sadducees are depicted in the Pesher on Nahum, which states "They [Manasseh] are the wicked ones ... whose reign over Israel will be brought down ... his wives, his children, and his infant will go into captivity. His warriors and his honored ones [will perish] by the sword." The reference to the Sadducees as those who reign over Israel corroborates their aristocratic status as opposed to the more fringe group of Essenes. Furthermore, it suggests that the Essenes challenged the authenticity of the rule of the Sadducees, blaming the downfall of ancient Israel and the siege of Jerusalem on their impiety. The Dead Sea Scrolls specify the Sadducaic elite as those who broke the covenant with God in their rule of the Judean state, and thus became targets of divine vengeance.

=== Opposition to the early Christian church ===
The New Testament, in the books of Mark, Matthew, and Luke, describe anecdotes which hint at hostility between Jesus and the Sadducaic establishment. A pericope in Mark 12, Luke 20 and Matthew 22 recounts a dispute between Jesus and a group of Sadducees who challenged the resurrection of the dead by asking who the husband of a resurrected woman would be who had been married, one after the other, to each of seven brothers. Jesus responds by charging the Sadducees with ignorance of the power of God, saying that the resurrected "neither marry nor are given in marriage, but are like angels in heaven." He also rebukes them for not knowing the Scriptures, citing a Torahic episode as his proof text. This was significant given that the Sadducees regarded the Torah alone as Scripture and would therefore have regarded themselves as experts in its interpretation.

Matthew records John the Baptist calling the Sadducees (and the Pharisees) a "brood of vipers".

=== Opposition to the Pharisees ===
Josephus, the author of the most extensive historical account of the Second Temple Period, gives a lengthy account of Jewish sectarianism in both The Jewish War and Jewish Antiquities. In Antiquities, he describes "the Pharisees have delivered to the people a great many observances by succession from their fathers, which are not written in the law of Moses, and for that reason it is that the Sadducees reject them and say that we are to esteem those observance to be obligatory which are in the written word, but are not to observe what are derived from the tradition of our forefathers." The Sadducees rejected the Pharisaic use of the Oral Torah to enforce their claims to power, citing the Written Torah as the sole manifestation of divinity.

The rabbis, who are traditionally seen as the descendants of the Pharisees, describe the similarities and differences between the two sects in Mishnah Yadaim. The Mishnah records a debate between the Pharisees and the Sadducees regarding the status of Holy Scriptures. The Sadducees questioned the Pharisaic doctrine that sacred scrolls "defile the hands," arguing that if holiness were an intrinsic property, it should apply to all books; they famously contrasted the scriptures with the books of Homer, which do not defile the hands. The Pharisaic response, as recorded in the Mishnah, justifies this distinction not through physical attributes, but through the covenantal relationship: they argued that the "defilement" of the scriptures is a byproduct of the community's "love" for them—meaning their status as a binding covenantal object—a status that the secular books of Homer lack.. A passage from the book of Acts suggests that both Pharisees and Sadducees collaborated in the Sanhedrin, the high Jewish court.
