= Choral Symphony (Dyson) =

Musical composition by George Dyson

George Dyson's Psalm CVII Symphony and Overture is a choral symphony written in 1910 as part of the composer's studies at Oxford for his Doctorate in Music. Not rediscovered until 2014, it is one of the few compositions surviving from the composer's early years.

== History ==
=== Composition ===
Dyson began work on the symphony shortly after completing his Bachelor of Music degree in 1909. Paul Spicer notes that the Oxford rules required a five-year gap between completing his Bachelorate and submitting for his Doctorate, this meant that while Dyson took his Doctoral exams in September and November 1910, the symphony was not submitted to the examiners until October 1917. Spicer writes that Dyson's choice of Psalm 107 as the basis of the symphony was most likely due to the vivid imagery contained within the psalm and the ease with which that imagery could be used to construct the individual movements of the work.

=== Rediscovery ===
Following the composer submitting the work for examination, it was archived and not rediscovered until 2014, when author Paul Spicer located the manuscript in the Bodleian Library while conducting research for his biography of George Dyson.

=== Performance history ===
The first performance of the composition following its rediscovery was on 13 March 2014, performed by the New London Orchestra, conducted by Ronald Corp accompanied by the Durham University Musical Society and London Choruses.

=== Recording ===
In 2017 Naxos Records announced that they would be releasing the premiere recording of the symphony by the Bournemouth Symphony Orchestra, conducted by David Hill and accompanied by the Bach Choir.

== Movements ==
The composition is a setting of selected verses from Psalm 107 for orchestra, double choir and four soloists, and is divided into four movements:

1. Overture: Adagio - Allegro energico - Adagio e tranquillo
2. Allegro agitato, ma non troppo - Quasi adagio e molto tranquillo - Allegretto cantabile
3. Largo
4. Allegro molto - Andante tranquillo - Con moto comodo
