= Psalm 106 =

106th psalm of the book of psalms

- "Praise ye the LORD. O give thanks unto the LORD"; for he is good.
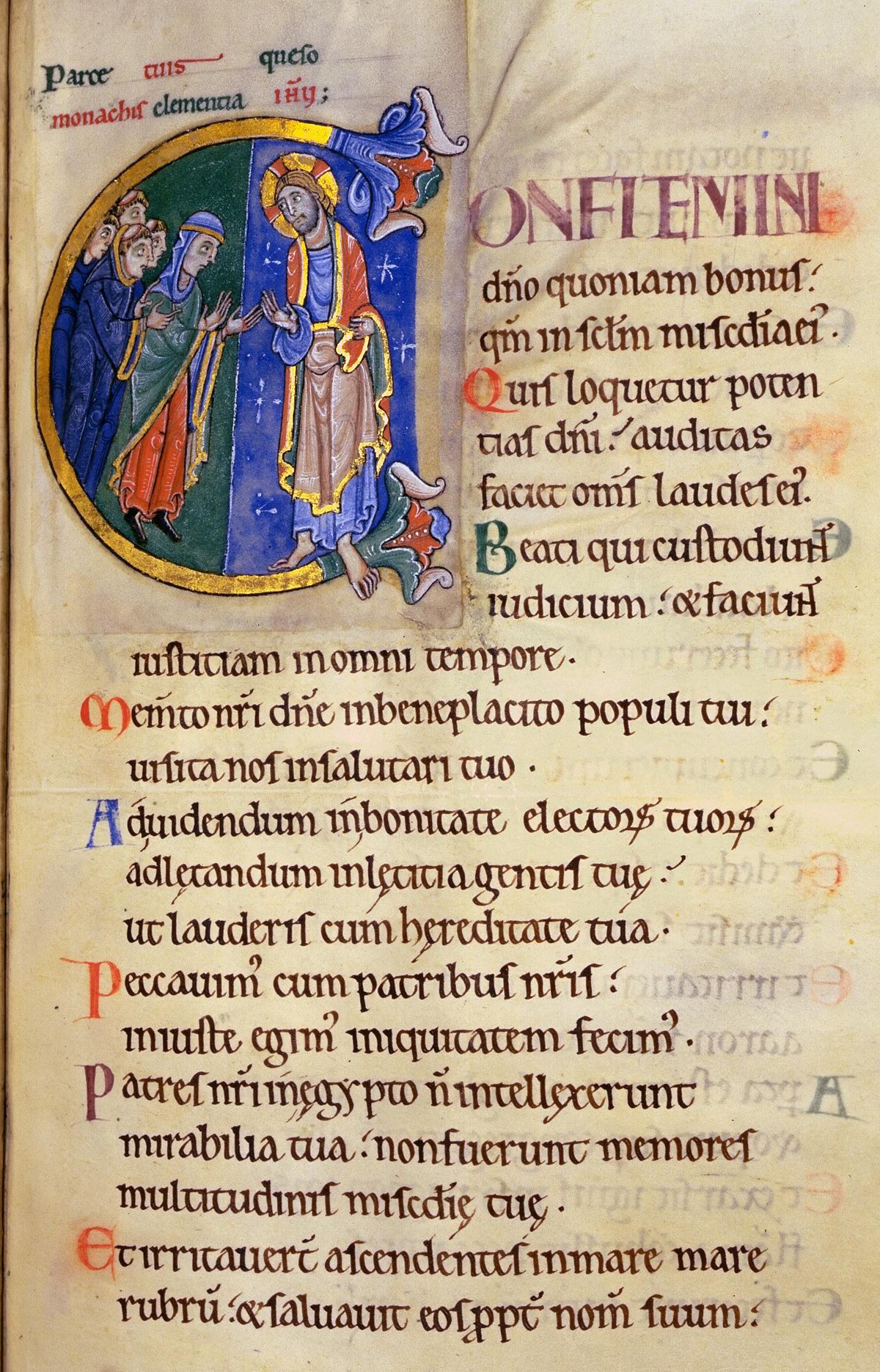
- Illuminated manuscript of Psalm 106:1-8 in the St. Albans Psalter, beginning with initial C for Confitemini
- Other name: Psalm 105; "Confitemini Domino quoniam bonus"
- Language: Hebrew (original)

Psalm 106
- ← Psalm 105 Psalm 107 →
- Book: Book of Psalms
- Hebrew Bible part: Ketuvim
- Order in the Hebrew part: 1
- Category: Sifrei Emet
- Christian Bible part: Old Testament
- Order in the Christian part: 19

Psalm 106 is the 106th psalm of the Book of Psalms, beginning in English in the King James Version: "Praise ye the LORD. O give thanks unto the LORD; for he is good". The Book of Psalms is part of the third section of the Hebrew Bible, and a book of the Christian Old Testament. In the slightly different numbering system used in the Greek Septuagint and Latin Vulgate translations of the Bible, this psalm is Psalm 105. In Latin, it is known by the incipit, "Confitemini Domino quoniam bonus". Alexander Kirkpatrick observes that the two historical psalms, Psalms 105 and 106, are closely related. Psalm 105 gives thanks for God's faithfulness to the covenant he made with Abraham; Psalm 106 is a psalm of penitence, reciting the history of Israel's faithlessness and disobedience. He also notes that this psalm and Psalm 107 "are closely connected together", arguing that "the division of the fourth and fifth books does not correspond to any difference of source or character, as is the case in the other books".

Psalm 106 is used in both Jewish and Christian liturgies. It has been paraphrased in hymns, and set to music.

== Uses ==
=== New Testament ===
- Verse 10 is quoted in the Song of Zechariah in Luke 1:71
- Verse 45 is quoted in Luke 1:72
- Verse 48 is quoted in Luke 1:68

=== Judaism ===
- This psalm is recited on the second day of Passover in some traditions.
- Verse 2 is the final verse of Anim Zemirot. It is recited by some Jews following Psalm 126 before Birkat Hamazon.
- Verse 45 is found in the Mussaf Amidah on Rosh Hashanah.
- Verse 47 is the third verse of the long Tachanun recited on Mondays and Thursdays, and is part of Baruch Hashem L'Olam during Maariv.

=== Eastern Orthodox Church ===
In the Eastern Orthodox Church, Psalm 105 (Psalm 106 in the Masoretic Text) is part of the fifteenth Kathisma division of the Psalter, read at Vespers on Thursday evenings, as well as on Tuesdays and Fridays during Lent, at the Sixth Hour and Matins, respectively.

== Musical settings ==
Verse 1 of Psalm 106 is the text for a round in German, "Danket, danket dem Herrn", with traditional music from the 18th century.

Heinrich Schütz wrote a setting of a paraphrase of the psalm in German, "Danket dem Herrn, erzeigt ihm Ehr", SWV 204, for the Becker Psalter, published first in 1628.

== Text ==
The following table shows the Hebrew text of the Psalm with vowels, alongside the Koine Greek text in the Septuagint and the English translation from the King James Version. Note that the meaning can slightly differ between these versions, as the Septuagint and the Masoretic Text come from different textual traditions. (Note: A 1917 translation directly from Hebrew to English by the Jewish Publication Society can be found here or here, and an 1844 translation directly from the Septuagint by L. C. L. Brenton can be found here. Both translations are in the public domain.) In the Septuagint, this psalm is numbered Psalm 105.

#	Hebrew	English	Greek
1	הַ֥לְלוּ־יָ֨הּ ׀ הוֹד֣וּ לַיהֹוָ֣ה כִּי־ט֑וֹב כִּ֖י לְעוֹלָ֣ם חַסְדּֽוֹ׃	Praise ye the LORD. O give thanks unto the LORD; for he is good: for his mercy endureth for ever.	᾿Αλληλούϊα. - ΕΞΟΜΟΛΟΓΕΙΣΘΕ τῷ Κυρίῳ, ὅτι χρηστός, ὅτι εἰς τὸν αἰῶνα τὸ ἔλεος αὐτοῦ.
2	מִ֗י יְ֭מַלֵּל גְּבוּר֣וֹת יְהֹוָ֑ה יַ֝שְׁמִ֗יעַ כׇּל־תְּהִלָּתֽוֹ׃	Who can utter the mighty acts of the LORD? who can shew forth all his praise?	τίς λαλήσει τὰς δυναστείας τοῦ Κυρίου, ἀκουστὰς ποιήσει πάσας τὰς αἰνέσεις αὐτοῦ;
3	אַ֭שְׁרֵי שֹׁמְרֵ֣י מִשְׁפָּ֑ט עֹשֵׂ֖ה צְדָקָ֣ה בְכׇל־עֵֽת׃	Blessed are they that keep judgment, and he that doeth righteousness at all times.	μακάριοι οἱ φυλάσσοντες κρίσιν καὶ ποιοῦντες δικαιοσύνην ἐν παντὶ καιρῷ.
4	זׇכְרֵ֣נִי יְ֭הֹוָה בִּרְצ֣וֹן עַמֶּ֑ךָ פׇּ֝קְדֵ֗נִי בִּישׁוּעָתֶֽךָ׃	Remember me, O LORD, with the favour that thou bearest unto thy people: O visit me with thy salvation;	μνήσθητι ἡμῶν, Κύριε, ἐν τῇ εὐδοκίᾳ τοῦ λαοῦ σου, ἐπίσκεψαι ἡμᾶς ἐν τῷ σωτηρίῳ σου
5	לִרְא֤וֹת ׀ בְּט֘וֹבַ֤ת בְּחִירֶ֗יךָ לִ֭שְׂמֹחַ בְּשִׂמְחַ֣ת גּוֹיֶ֑ךָ לְ֝הִתְהַלֵּ֗ל עִם־נַחֲלָתֶֽךָ׃	That I may see the good of thy chosen, that I may rejoice in the gladness of thy nation, that I may glory with thine inheritance.	τοῦ ἰδεῖν ἐν τῇ χρηστότητι τῶν ἐκλεκτῶν σου, τοῦ εὐφρανθῆναι ἐν τῇ εὐφροσύνῃ τοῦ ἔθνους σου, τοῦ ἐπαινεῖσθαι μετὰ τῆς κληρονομίας σου.
6	חָטָ֥אנוּ עִם־אֲבוֹתֵ֗ינוּ הֶעֱוִ֥ינוּ הִרְשָֽׁעְנוּ׃	We have sinned with our fathers, we have committed iniquity, we have done wickedly.	ἡμάρτομεν μετὰ τῶν πατέρων ἡμῶν, ἠνομήσαμεν, ἠδικήσαμεν.
7	אֲב֘וֹתֵ֤ינוּ בְמִצְרַ֨יִם ׀ לֹֽא־הִשְׂכִּ֬ילוּ נִפְלְאוֹתֶ֗יךָ לֹ֣א זָ֭כְרוּ אֶת־רֹ֣ב חֲסָדֶ֑יךָ וַיַּמְר֖וּ עַל־יָ֣ם בְּיַם־סֽוּף׃	Our fathers understood not thy wonders in Egypt; they remembered not the multitude of thy mercies; but provoked him at the sea, even at the Red sea.	οἱ πατέρες ἡμῶν ἐν Αἰγύπτῳ οὐ συνῆκαν τὰ θαυμάσιά σου καὶ οὐκ ἐμνήσθησαν τοῦ πλήθους τοῦ ἐλέους σου καὶ παρεπίκραναν ἀναβαίνοντες ἐν τῇ ἐρυθρᾷ θαλάσσῃ.
8	וַֽ֭יּוֹשִׁיעֵם לְמַ֣עַן שְׁמ֑וֹ לְ֝הוֹדִ֗יעַ אֶת־גְּבוּרָתֽוֹ׃	Nevertheless, he saved them for his name's sake, that he might make his mighty power to be known.	καὶ ἔσωσεν αὐτοὺς ἕνεκεν τοῦ ὀνόματος αὐτοῦ τοῦ γνωρίσαι τὴν δυναστείαν αὐτοῦ·
9	וַיִּגְעַ֣ר בְּיַם־ס֭וּף וַֽיֶּחֱרָ֑ב וַיּוֹלִיכֵ֥ם בַּ֝תְּהֹמ֗וֹת כַּמִּדְבָּֽר׃	He rebuked the Red sea also, and it was dried up: so he led them through the depths, as through the wilderness.	καὶ ἐπετίμησε τῇ ἐρυθρᾷ θαλάσσῃ, καὶ ἐξηράνθη, καὶ ὡδήγησεν αὐτοὺς ἐν ἀβύσσῳ ὡς ἐν ἐρήμῳ·
10	וַֽ֭יּוֹשִׁיעֵם מִיַּ֣ד שׂוֹנֵ֑א וַ֝יִּגְאָלֵ֗ם מִיַּ֥ד אוֹיֵֽב׃	And he saved them from the hand of him that hated them, and redeemed them from the hand of the enemy.	καὶ ἔσωσεν αὐτοὺς ἐκ χειρὸς μισοῦντος καὶ ἐλυτρώσατο αὐτοὺς ἐκ χειρὸς ἐχθρῶν·
11	וַיְכַסּוּ־מַ֥יִם צָרֵיהֶ֑ם אֶחָ֥ד מֵ֝הֶ֗ם לֹ֣א נוֹתָֽר׃	And the waters covered their enemies: there was not one of them left.	ἐκάλυψεν ὕδωρ τοὺς θλίβοντας αὐτούς, εἷς ἐξ αὐτῶν οὐχ ὑπελείφθη.
12	וַיַּאֲמִ֥ינוּ בִדְבָרָ֑יו יָ֝שִׁ֗ירוּ תְּהִלָּתֽוֹ׃	Then believed they his words; they sang his praise.	καὶ ἐπίστευσαν τοῖς λόγοις αὐτοῦ καὶ ᾖσαν τὴν αἴνεσιν αὐτοῦ.
13	מִ֭הֲרוּ שָׁכְח֣וּ מַֽעֲשָׂ֑יו לֹא־חִ֝כּ֗וּ לַעֲצָתֽוֹ׃	They soon forgot his works; they waited not for his counsel:	ἐτάχυναν, ἐπελάθοντο τῶν ἔργων αὐτοῦ, οὐχ ὑπέμειναν τὴν βουλὴν αὐτοῦ·
14	וַיִּתְאַוּ֣וּ תַ֭אֲוָה בַּמִּדְבָּ֑ר וַיְנַסּוּ־אֵ֝֗ל בִּישִׁימֽוֹן׃	But lusted exceedingly in the wilderness, and tempted God in the desert.	καὶ ἐπεθύμησαν ἐπιθυμίαν ἐν τῇ ἐρήμῳ καὶ ἐπείρασαν τὸν Θεὸν ἐν ἀνύδρῳ.
15	וַיִּתֵּ֣ן לָ֭הֶם שֶׁאֱלָתָ֑ם וַיְשַׁלַּ֖ח רָז֣וֹן בְּנַפְשָֽׁם׃	And he gave them their request; but sent leanness into their soul.	καὶ ἔδωκεν αὐτοῖς τὸ αἴτημα αὐτῶν, καὶ ἐξαπέστειλε πλησμονὴν εἰς τὰς ψυχὰς αὐτῶν.
16	וַיְקַנְא֣וּ לְ֭מֹשֶׁה בַּֽמַּחֲנֶ֑ה לְ֝אַהֲרֹ֗ן קְד֣וֹשׁ יְהֹוָֽה׃	They envied Moses also in the camp, and Aaron the saint of the LORD.	καὶ παρώργισαν Μωυσῆν ἐν τῇ παρεμβολῇ, τὸν ᾿Ααρὼν τὸν ἅγιον Κυρίου·
17	תִּפְתַּח־אֶ֭רֶץ וַתִּבְלַ֣ע דָּתָ֑ן וַ֝תְּכַ֗ס עַל־עֲדַ֥ת אֲבִירָֽם׃	The earth opened and swallowed up Dathan and covered the company of Abiram.	ἠνοίχθη ἡ γῆ καὶ κατέπιε Δαθὰν καὶ ἐκάλυψεν ἐπὶ τὴν συναγωγὴν ᾿Αβειρών·
18	וַתִּבְעַר־אֵ֥שׁ בַּעֲדָתָ֑ם לֶ֝הָבָ֗ה תְּלַהֵ֥ט רְשָׁעִֽים׃	And a fire was kindled in their company; the flame burned up the wicked.	καὶ ἐξεκαύθη πῦρ ἐν τῇ συναγωγῇ αὐτῶν, φλὸξ κατέφλεξεν ἁμαρτωλούς.
19	יַעֲשׂוּ־עֵ֥גֶל בְּחֹרֵ֑ב וַ֝יִּשְׁתַּחֲו֗וּ לְמַסֵּכָֽה׃|	They made a calf in Horeb, and worshipped the molten image.	καὶ ἐποίησαν μόσχον ἐν Χωρὴβ καὶ προσεκύνησαν τῷ γλυπτῷ.
20	וַיָּמִ֥ירוּ אֶת־כְּבוֹדָ֑ם בְּתַבְנִ֥ית שׁ֝֗וֹר אֹכֵ֥ל עֵֽשֶׂב׃	Thus they changed their glory into the similitude of an ox that eateth grass.	καὶ ἠλλάξαντο τὴν δόξαν αὐτῶν ἐν ὁμοιώματι μόσχου ἐσθίοντος χόρτον.
21	שָׁ֭כְחוּ אֵ֣ל מוֹשִׁיעָ֑ם עֹשֶׂ֖ה גְדֹל֣וֹת בְּמִצְרָֽיִם׃	They forgat God their saviour, which had done great things in Egypt;	καὶ ἐπελάθοντο τοῦ Θεοῦ τοῦ σῴζοντος αὐτούς, τοῦ ποιήσαντος μεγάλα ἐν Αἰγύπτῳ,
22	נִ֭פְלָאוֹת בְּאֶ֣רֶץ חָ֑ם נ֝וֹרָא֗וֹת עַל־יַם־סֽוּף׃	Wondrous works in the land of Ham, and terrible things by the Red sea.	θαυμαστὰ ἐν γῇ Χάμ, φοβερὰ ἐπὶ θαλάσσης ἐρυθρᾶς.
23	וַיֹּ֗אמֶר לְֽהַשְׁמִ֫ידָ֥ם לוּלֵ֡י מֹ֘שֶׁ֤ה בְחִיר֗וֹ עָמַ֣ד בַּפֶּ֣רֶץ לְפָנָ֑יו לְהָשִׁ֥יב חֲ֝מָת֗וֹ מֵהַשְׁחִֽית׃	Therefore, he said that he would destroy them, had not Moses his chosen stood before him in the breach, to turn away his wrath, lest he should destroy them.	καὶ εἶπε τοῦ ἐξολοθρεῦσαι αὐτούς, εἰ μὴ Μωυσῆς ὁ ἐκλεκτὸς αὐτοῦ ἔστη ἐν τῇ θραύσει ἐνώπιον αὐτοῦ τοῦ ἀποστρέψαι τὸν θυμὸν αὐτοῦ τοῦ μὴ ἐξολοθρεῦσαι αὐτούς.
24	וַֽ֭יִּמְאֲסוּ בְּאֶ֣רֶץ חֶמְדָּ֑ה לֹא־הֶ֝אֱמִ֗ינוּ לִדְבָרֽוֹ׃	Yea, they despised the pleasant land, they believed not his word:	καὶ ἐξουδένωσαν γῆν ἐπιθυμητήν, οὐκ ἐπίστευσαν τῷ λόγῳ αὐτοῦ·
25	וַיֵּרָגְנ֥וּ בְאׇהֳלֵיהֶ֑ם לֹ֥א שָׁ֝מְע֗וּ בְּק֣וֹל יְהֹוָֽה׃	But murmured in their tents, and hearkened not unto the voice of the LORD.	καὶ ἐγόγγυσαν ἐν τοῖς σκηνώμασιν αὐτῶν, οὐκ εἰσήκουσαν τῆς φωνῆς Κυρίου.
26	וַיִּשָּׂ֣א יָד֣וֹ לָהֶ֑ם לְהַפִּ֥יל א֝וֹתָ֗ם בַּמִּדְבָּֽר׃	Therefore, he lifted up his hand against them, to overthrow them in the wilderness:	καὶ ἐπῆρε τὴν χεῖρα αὐτοῦ ἐπ᾿ αὐτοὺς τοῦ καταβαλεῖν αὐτοὺς ἐν τῇ ἐρήμῳ
27	וּלְהַפִּ֣יל זַ֭רְעָם בַּגּוֹיִ֑ם וּ֝לְזָרוֹתָ֗ם בָּאֲרָצֽוֹת׃	To overthrow their seed also among the nations, and to scatter them in the lands.	καὶ τοῦ καταβαλεῖν τὸ σπέρμα αὐτῶν ἐν τοῖς ἔθνεσι καὶ διασκορπίσαι αὐτοὺς ἐν ταῖς χώραις.
28	וַ֭יִּצָּ֣מְדוּ לְבַ֣עַל פְּע֑וֹר וַ֝יֹּאכְל֗וּ זִבְחֵ֥י מֵתִֽים׃	They joined themselves also unto Baalpeor, and ate the sacrifices of the dead.	καὶ ἐτελέσθησαν τῷ Βεελφεγὼρ καὶ ἔφαγον θυσίας νεκρῶν·
29	וַ֭יַּכְעִיסוּ בְּמַ֥עַלְלֵיהֶ֑ם וַתִּפְרׇץ־בָּ֝֗ם מַגֵּפָֽה׃	Thus they provoked him to anger with their inventions: and the plague brake in upon them.	καὶ παρώξυναν αὐτὸν ἐν τοῖς ἐπιτηδεύμασιν αὐτῶν, καὶ ἐπληθύνθη ἐν αὐτοῖς ἡ πτῶσις.
30	וַיַּעֲמֹ֣ד פִּֽ֭ינְחָס וַיְפַלֵּ֑ל וַ֝תֵּעָצַ֗ר הַמַּגֵּפָֽה׃	Then stood up Phinehas, and executed judgment: and so the plague was stayed.	καὶ ἔστη Φινεὲς καὶ ἐξιλάσατο, καὶ ἐκόπασεν ἡ θραῦσις·
31	וַתֵּחָ֣שֶׁב ל֭וֹ לִצְדָקָ֑ה לְדֹ֥ר וָ֝דֹ֗ר עַד־עוֹלָֽם׃	And that was counted unto him for righteousness unto all generations for evermore.	καὶ ἐλογίσθη αὐτῷ εἰς δικαιοσύνην εἰς γενεὰν καὶ γενεὰν ἕως τοῦ αἰῶνος.
32	וַ֭יַּקְצִיפוּ עַל־מֵ֥י מְרִיבָ֑ה וַיֵּ֥רַע לְ֝מֹשֶׁ֗ה בַּעֲבוּרָֽם׃	They angered him also at the waters of strife, so that it went ill with Moses for their sakes:	καὶ παρώργισαν αὐτὸν ἐπὶ ὕδατος ἀντιλογίας καὶ ἐκακώθη Μωυσῆς δι᾿ αὐτούς,
33	כִּי־הִמְר֥וּ אֶת־רוּח֑וֹ וַ֝יְבַטֵּ֗א בִּשְׂפָתָֽיו׃	Because they provoked his spirit, so that he spake unadvisedly with his lips.	ὅτι παρεπίκραναν τὸ πνεῦμα αὐτοῦ, καὶ διέστειλεν ἐν τοῖς χείλεσιν αὐτοῦ.
34	לֹֽא־הִ֭שְׁמִידוּ אֶת־הָעַמִּ֑ים אֲשֶׁ֤ר אָמַ֖ר יְהֹוָ֣ה לָהֶֽם׃	They did not destroy the nations, concerning whom the LORD commanded them:	οὐκ ἐξωλόθρευσαν τὰ ἔθνη, ἃ εἶπε Κύριος αὐτοῖς,
35	וַיִּתְעָרְב֥וּ בַגּוֹיִ֑ם וַֽ֝יִּלְמְד֗וּ מַעֲשֵׂיהֶֽם׃	But were mingled among the heathen, and learned their works.	καὶ ἐμίγησαν ἐν τοῖς ἔθνεσι καὶ ἔμαθον τὰ ἔργα αὐτῶν·
36	וַיַּעַבְד֥וּ אֶת־עֲצַבֵּיהֶ֑ם וַיִּהְי֖וּ לָהֶ֣ם לְמוֹקֵֽשׁ׃	And they served their idols: which were a snare unto them.	καὶ ἐδούλευσαν τοῖς γλυπτοῖς αὐτῶν, καὶ ἐγενήθη αὐτοῖς εἰς σκάνδαλον·
37	וַיִּזְבְּח֣וּ אֶת־בְּ֭נֵיהֶם וְאֶת־בְּנוֹתֵיהֶ֗ם לַשֵּׁדִֽים׃	Yea, they sacrificed their sons and their daughters unto devils,	καὶ ἔθυσαν τοὺς υἱοὺς αὐτῶν καὶ τὰς θυγατέρας αὐτῶν τοῖς δαιμονίοις
38	וַיִּ֥שְׁפְּכ֨וּ דָ֪ם נָקִ֡י דַּם־בְּנֵ֘יהֶ֤ם וּֽבְנוֹתֵיהֶ֗ם אֲשֶׁ֣ר זִ֭בְּחוּ לַעֲצַבֵּ֣י כְנָ֑עַן וַתֶּחֱנַ֥ף הָ֝אָ֗רֶץ בַּדָּמִֽים׃	And shed innocent blood, even the blood of their sons and of their daughters, whom they sacrificed unto the idols of Canaan: and the land was polluted with blood.	καὶ ἐξέχεαν αἷμα ἀθῷον, αἷμα υἱῶν αὐτῶν καὶ θυγατέρων, ὧν ἔθυσαν τοῖς γλυπτοῖς Χαναὰν καὶ ἐφονοκτονήθη ἡ γῆ ἐν τοῖς αἵμασι
39	וַיִּטְמְא֥וּ בְמַעֲשֵׂיהֶ֑ם וַ֝יִּזְנ֗וּ בְּמַ֥עַלְלֵיהֶֽם׃	Thus were they defiled with their own works, and went a whoring with their own inventions.	καὶ ἐμιάνθη ἐν τοῖς ἔργοις αὐτῶν, καὶ ἐπόρνευσαν ἐν τοῖς ἐπιτηδεύμασιν αὐτῶν.
40	וַיִּֽחַר־אַ֣ף יְהֹוָ֣ה בְּעַמּ֑וֹ וַ֝יְתָעֵ֗ב אֶת־נַחֲלָתֽוֹ׃	Therefore, was the wrath of the LORD kindled against his people, insomuch that he abhorred his own inheritance.	καὶ ὠργίσθη θυμῷ Κύριος ἐπὶ τὸν λαὸν αὐτοῦ καὶ ἐβδελύξατο τὴν κληρονομίαν αὐτοῦ·
41	וַיִּתְּנֵ֥ם בְּיַד־גּוֹיִ֑ם וַֽיִּמְשְׁל֥וּ בָ֝הֶ֗ם שֹׂנְאֵיהֶֽם׃	And he gave them into the hand of the heathen; and they that hated them ruled over them.	καὶ παρέδωκεν αὐτοὺς εἰς χεῖρας ἐχθρῶν, καὶ ἐκυρίευσαν αὐτῶν οἱ μισοῦντες αὐτούς.
42	וַיִּלְחָצ֥וּם אוֹיְבֵיהֶ֑ם וַ֝יִּכָּנְע֗וּ תַּ֣חַת יָדָֽם׃	Their enemies also oppressed them, and they were brought into subjection under their hand.	καὶ ἔθλιψαν αὐτοὺς οἱ ἐχθροὶ αὐτῶν, καὶ ἐταπεινώθησαν ὑπὸ τὰς χεῖρας αὐτῶν.
43	פְּעָמִ֥ים רַבּ֗וֹת יַצִּ֫ילֵ֥ם וְ֭הֵמָּה יַמְר֣וּ בַעֲצָתָ֑ם וַ֝יָּמֹ֗כּוּ בַּעֲוֺנָֽם׃	Many times did he deliver them; but they provoked him with their counsel, and were brought low for their iniquity.	πλεονάκις ἐρρύσατο αὐτούς, αὐτοὶ δὲ παρεπίκραναν αὐτὸν ἐν τῇ βουλῇ αὐτῶν καὶ ἐταπεινώθησαν ἐν ταῖς ἀνομίαις αὐτῶν.
44	וַ֭יַּרְא בַּצַּ֣ר לָהֶ֑ם בְּ֝שׇׁמְע֗וֹ אֶת־רִנָּתָֽם׃	Nevertheless, he regarded their affliction, when he heard their cry:	καὶ εἶδε Κύριος ἐν τῷ θλίβεσθαι αὐτούς, ἐν τῷ αὐτὸν εἰσακοῦσαι τῆς δεήσεως αὐτῶν·
45	וַיִּזְכֹּ֣ר לָהֶ֣ם בְּרִית֑וֹ וַ֝יִּנָּחֵ֗ם כְּרֹ֣ב חֲסָדָֽו׃	And he remembered for them his covenant, and repented according to the multitude of his mercies.	καὶ ἐμνήσθη τῆς διαθήκης αὐτοῦ καὶ μετεμελήθη κατὰ τὸ πλῆθος τοῦ ἐλέους αὐτοῦ
46	וַיִּתֵּ֣ן אוֹתָ֣ם לְרַחֲמִ֑ים לִ֝פְנֵ֗י כׇּל־שׁוֹבֵיהֶֽם׃	He made them also to be pitied of all those that carried them captives.	καὶ ἔδωκεν αὐτοὺς εἰς οἰκτιρμοὺς ἐναντίον πάντων τῶν αἰχμαλωτευσάντων αὐτούς.
47	הוֹשִׁיעֵ֨נוּ ׀ יְ֘הֹוָ֤ה אֱלֹהֵ֗ינוּ וְקַבְּצֵנוּ֮ מִֽן־הַגּ֫וֹיִ֥ם לְ֭הֹדוֹת לְשֵׁ֣ם קׇדְשֶׁ֑ךָ לְ֝הִשְׁתַּבֵּ֗חַ בִּתְהִלָּתֶֽךָ׃	Save us, O LORD our God, and gather us from among the heathen, to give thanks unto thy holy name, and to triumph in thy praise.	σῶσον ἡμᾶς, Κύριε ὁ Θεὸς ἡμῶν, καὶ ἐπισυνάγαγε ἡμᾶς ἐκ τῶν ἐθνῶν τοῦ ἐξομολογήσασθαι τῷ ὀνόματί σου τῷ ἁγίῳ, τοῦ ἐγκαυχᾶσθαι ἐν τῇ αἰνέσει σου.
48	בָּ֤רֽוּךְ יְהֹוָ֨ה אֱלֹהֵ֪י יִשְׂרָאֵ֡ל מִן־הָ֤עוֹלָ֨ם ׀ וְעַ֬ד הָעוֹלָ֗ם וְאָמַ֖ר כׇּל־הָעָ֥ם אָמֵ֗ן הַֽלְלוּ־יָֽהּ׃	Blessed be the LORD God of Israel from everlasting to everlasting: and let all the people say, Amen. Praise ye the LORD.	εὐλογητὸς Κύριος ὁ Θεὸς ᾿Ισραὴλ ἀπὸ τοῦ αἰῶνος καὶ ἕως τοῦ αἰῶνος. καὶ ἐρεῖ πᾶς ὁ λαός· γένοιτο γένοιτο.

== Verse 22 ==
Wondrous works in the land of Ham, and awesome deeds by the Red Sea.

This is the final reference to Egypt as the land of Ham in the Psalms: other references are at Psalm 78:51 and Psalm 105:23 and 27.

== Verse 48 ==
Blessed be the Lord God of Israel
From everlasting to everlasting!
And let all the people say, 'Amen!'
Praise the Lord!

These words correspond to the concluding verses of Psalms 41 and 89, which end Books 1 and 3 of the psalter, but Kirkpatrick observes that "the liturgical direction 'and all the people shall say, Amen, Hallelujah' (or 'Praise the Lord!') seems to imply that the doxology here is not a mere mark of the end of the Fourth Book, but was actually sung at the close of the Psalm."
