= Psalm 78 =

Biblical psalm

- "Give ear, O my people, to my law"
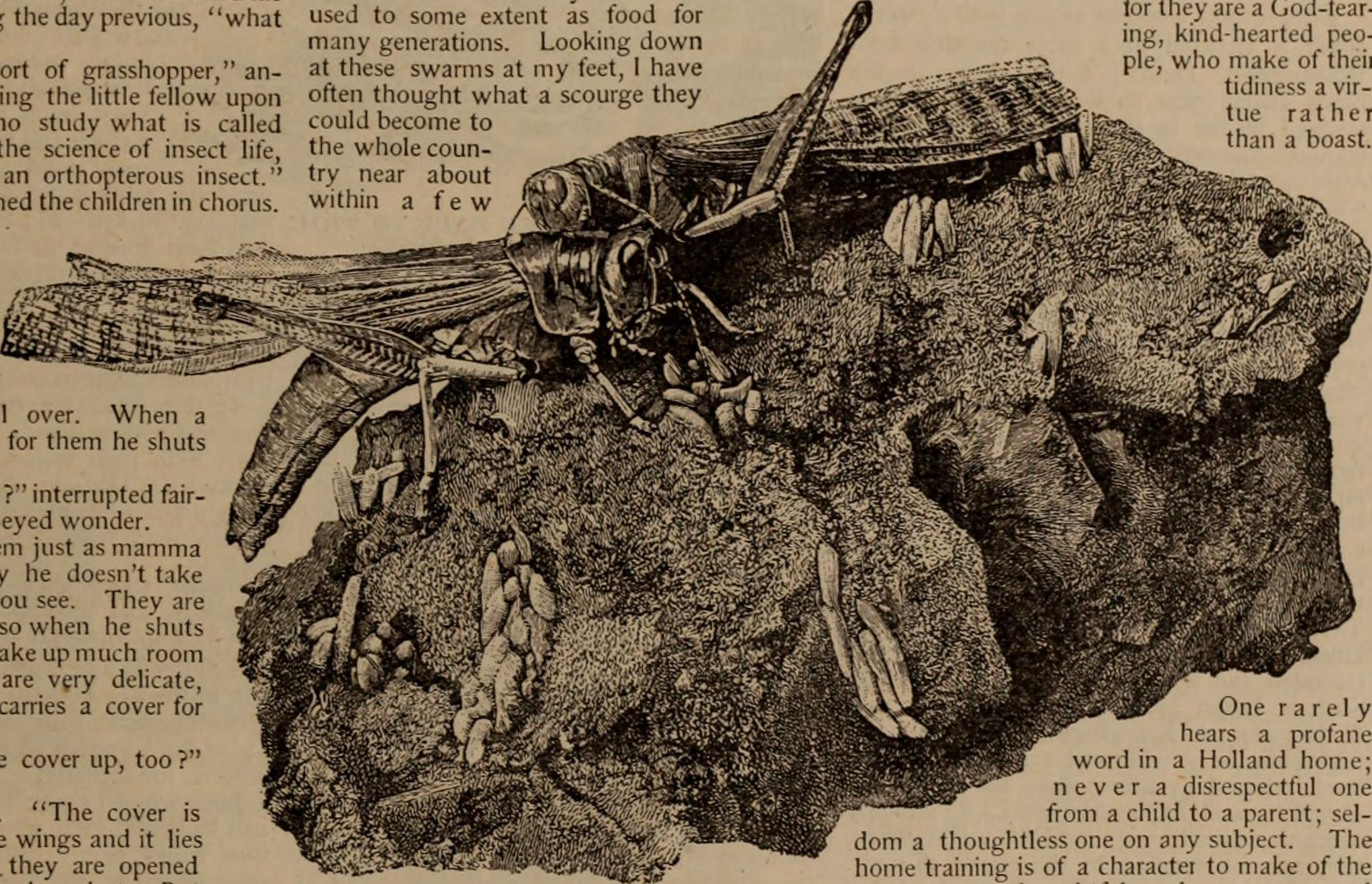
- Page from a 1891 book, showing locusts as mentioned in verse 49
- Other name: Psalmus 77; "Adtendite populus meus legem meam"
- Language: Hebrew (original)

Psalm 78
- ← Psalm 77 Psalm 79 →
- Book: Book of Psalms
- Hebrew Bible part: Ketuvim
- Order in the Hebrew part: 1
- Category: Sifrei Emet
- Christian Bible part: Old Testament
- Order in the Christian part: 19

Psalm 78 is the 78th psalm of the Book of Psalms, beginning in English in the King James Version: "Give ear, O my people, to my law". In the slightly different numbering system used in the Greek Septuagint and Latin Vulgate translations of the Bible, this psalm is Psalm 77. In Latin, it is known as "Adtendite populus meus legem meam". It is one of the twelve Psalms of Asaph and is described as a "maskil" or "contemplation". It is the second-longest Psalm, with 72 verses (Psalm 119 has 176 verses), and the first of the three great history psalms (the others being Psalms 105 and 106). The New American Bible, Revised Edition entitles it "a new beginning in Zion and David".

The psalm forms a regular part of Jewish, Catholic, Lutheran, Anglican and other Protestant liturgies. It has been set to music.

== Uses ==
=== New Testament ===
In the New Testament:

- Verse 2 is quoted in Matthew 13:35
- Verse 24 is quoted in John 6:31

=== Judaism ===
- This psalm is recited on the third through sixth days of Passover in some traditions.
- Verse 36–37 are found in the Foundation of Repentance recited on the eve of Rosh Hashanah.
- Verse 38 (V'hu Rachum) is the first verse of a paragraph by the same name in Pesukei Dezimra, is the seventeenth verse of Yehi Kivod in Pesukei Dezimra, is the opening verse of the long Tachanun recited on Mondays and Thursdays, is found in Uva Letzion, and is one of two verses recited at the beginning of Maariv.
- Verse 54 is part of Pirkei Avot Chapter 6, no. 10.
- Verse 61 is part of the long Tachanun recited on Mondays and Thursdays.

=== Book of Common Prayer ===
In the Church of England's Book of Common Prayer, this psalm is appointed to be read on the evening of the 15th day of the month.

== Musical settings ==
Heinrich Schütz set Psalm 78 in a metred version in German, "Hör, mein Volk, mein Gesetz und Weis", SWV 176, as part of the Becker Psalter, first published in 1628.

== Text ==
The following table shows the Hebrew text of the Psalm with vowels, alongside the Koine Greek text in the Septuagint and the English translation from the King James Version. Note that the meaning can slightly differ between these versions, as the Septuagint and the Masoretic Text come from different textual traditions. (Note: A 1917 translation directly from Hebrew to English by the Jewish Publication Society can be found here or here, and an 1844 translation directly from the Septuagint by L. C. L. Brenton can be found here. Both translations are in the public domain.) In the Septuagint, this psalm is numbered Psalm 77.

#	Hebrew	English	Greek
1	מַשְׂכִּ֗יל לְאָ֫סָ֥ף הַאֲזִ֣ינָה עַ֭מִּי תּוֹרָתִ֑י הַטּ֥וּ אׇ֝זְנְכֶ֗ם לְאִמְרֵי־פִֽי׃	(Maschil of Asaph.) Give ear, O my people, to my law: incline your ears to the words of my mouth.	Συνέσεως τῷ ᾿Ασάφ. - ΠΡΟΣΕΧΕΤΕ, λαός μου, τῷ νόμῳ μου, κλίνατε τὸ οὖς ὑμῶν εἰς τὰ ῥήματα τοῦ στόματός μου·
2	אֶפְתְּחָ֣ה בְמָשָׁ֣ל פִּ֑י אַבִּ֥יעָה חִ֝יד֗וֹת מִנִּי־קֶֽדֶם׃	I will open my mouth in a parable: I will utter dark sayings of old:	ἀνοίξω ἐν παραβολαῖς τὸ στόμα μου, φθέγξομαι προβλήματα ἀπ᾿ ἀρχῆς.
3	אֲשֶׁ֣ר שָׁ֭מַעְנוּ וַנֵּדָעֵ֑ם וַ֝אֲבוֹתֵ֗ינוּ סִפְּרוּ־לָֽנוּ׃	Which we have heard and known, and our fathers have told us.	ὅσα ἠκούσαμεν καὶ ἔγνωμεν αὐτὰ καὶ οἱ πατέρες ἡμῶν διηγήσαντο ἡμῖν,
4	לֹ֤א נְכַחֵ֨ד ׀ מִבְּנֵיהֶ֗ם לְד֥וֹר אַחֲר֗וֹן מְֽ֭סַפְּרִים תְּהִלּ֣וֹת יְהֹוָ֑ה וֶעֱזוּז֥וֹ וְ֝נִפְלְאֹתָ֗יו אֲשֶׁ֣ר עָשָֽׂה׃	We will not hide them from their children, shewing to the generation to come the praises of the LORD, and his strength, and his wonderful works that he hath done.	οὐκ ἐκρύβη ἀπὸ τῶν τέκνων αὐτῶν εἰς γενεὰν ἑτέραν, ἀπαγγέλλοντες τὰς αἰνέσεις Κυρίου καὶ τὰς δυναστείας αὐτοῦ καὶ τὰ θαυμάσια αὐτοῦ, ἃ ἐποίησε.
5	וַיָּ֤קֶם עֵד֨וּת ׀ בְּֽיַעֲקֹ֗ב וְתוֹרָה֮ שָׂ֤ם בְּיִשְׂרָ֫אֵ֥ל אֲשֶׁ֣ר צִ֭וָּה אֶת־אֲבוֹתֵ֑ינוּ לְ֝הוֹדִיעָ֗ם לִבְנֵיהֶֽם׃	For he established a testimony in Jacob, and appointed a law in Israel, which he commanded our fathers, that they should make them known to their children:	καὶ ἀνέστησε μαρτύριον ἐν ᾿Ιακὼβ καὶ νόμον ἔθετο ἐν ᾿Ισραήλ, ὅσα ἐνετείλατο τοῖς πατράσιν ἡμῶν τοῦ γνωρίσαι αὐτὰ τοῖς υἱοῖς αὐτῶν,
6	לְמַ֤עַן יֵדְע֨וּ ׀ דּ֣וֹר אַ֭חֲרוֹן בָּנִ֣ים יִוָּלֵ֑דוּ יָ֝קֻ֗מוּ וִיסַפְּר֥וּ לִבְנֵיהֶֽם׃	That the generation to come might know them, even the children which should be born; who should arise and declare them to their children:	ὅπως ἂν γνῷ γενεὰ ἑτέρα, υἱοὶ οἱ τεχθησόμενοι, καὶ ἀναστήσονται καὶ ἀπαγγελοῦσιν αὐτὰ τοῖς υἱοῖς αὐτῶν·
7	וְיָשִׂ֥ימוּ בֵאלֹהִ֗ים כִּ֫סְלָ֥ם וְלֹ֣א יִ֭שְׁכְּחוּ מַ֥עַלְלֵי־אֵ֑ל וּמִצְוֺתָ֥יו יִנְצֹֽרוּ׃	That they might set their hope in God, and not forget the works of God, but keep his commandments:	ἵνα θῶνται ἐπὶ τὸν Θεὸν τὴν ἐλπίδα αὐτῶν καὶ μὴ ἐπιλάθωνται τῶν ἔργων τοῦ Θεοῦ καὶ τὰς ἐντολὰς αὐτοῦ ἐκζητήσωσιν·
8	וְלֹ֤א יִהְי֨וּ ׀ כַּאֲבוֹתָ֗ם דּוֹר֮ סוֹרֵ֢ר וּמֹ֫רֶ֥ה דּ֭וֹר לֹא־הֵכִ֣ין לִבּ֑וֹ וְלֹֽא־נֶאֶמְנָ֖ה אֶת־אֵ֣ל רוּחֽוֹ׃	And might not be as their fathers, a stubborn and rebellious generation; a generation that set not their heart aright, and whose spirit was not stedfast with God.	ἵνα μὴ γένωνται ὡς οἱ πατέρες αὐτῶν, γενεὰ σκολιὰ καὶ παραπικραίνουσα, γενεά, ἥτις οὐ κατηύθυνε τὴν καρδίαν ἑαυτῆς καὶ οὐκ ἐπιστώθη μετὰ τοῦ Θεοῦ τὸ πνεῦμα αὐτῆς.
9	בְּֽנֵי־אֶפְרַ֗יִם נוֹשְׁקֵ֥י רֽוֹמֵי־קָ֑שֶׁת הָ֝פְכ֗וּ בְּי֣וֹם קְרָֽב׃	The children of Ephraim, being armed, and carrying bows, turned back in the day of battle.	υἱοὶ ᾿Εφραὶμ ἐντείνοντες καὶ βάλλοντες τόξοις ἐστράφησαν ἐν ἡμέρᾳ πολέμου.
10	לֹ֣א שָׁ֭מְרוּ בְּרִ֣ית אֱלֹהִ֑ים וּ֝בְתוֹרָת֗וֹ מֵאֲנ֥וּ לָלֶֽכֶת׃	They kept not the covenant of God, and refused to walk in his law;	οὐκ ἐφύλαξαν τὴν διαθήκην τοῦ Θεοῦ καὶ ἐν τῷ νόμῳ αὐτοῦ οὐκ ἠβουλήθησαν πορεύεσθαι.
11	וַיִּשְׁכְּח֥וּ עֲלִילוֹתָ֑יו וְ֝נִפְלְאוֹתָ֗יו אֲשֶׁ֣ר הֶרְאָֽם׃	And forgat his works, and his wonders that he had shewed them.	καὶ ἐπελάθοντο τῶν εὐεργεσιῶν αὐτοῦ καὶ τῶν θαυμασίων αὐτοῦ, ὧν ἔδειξεν αὐτοῖς,
12	נֶ֣גֶד אֲ֭בוֹתָם עָ֣שָׂה פֶ֑לֶא בְּאֶ֖רֶץ מִצְרַ֣יִם שְׂדֵה־צֹֽעַן׃	Marvellous things did he in the sight of their fathers, in the land of Egypt, in the field of Zoan.	ἐναντίον τῶν πατέρων αὐτῶν ἃ ἐποίησε θαυμάσια ἐν γῇ Αἰγύπτῳ, ἐν πεδίῳ Τάνεως.
13	בָּ֣קַע יָ֭ם וַיַּעֲבִירֵ֑ם וַֽיַּצֶּב־מַ֥יִם כְּמוֹ־נֵֽד׃	He divided the sea, and caused them to pass through; and he made the waters to stand as an heap.	διέρρηξε θάλασσαν καὶ διήγαγεν αὐτούς, παρέστησεν ὕδατα ὡσεὶ ἀσκὸν
14	וַיַּנְחֵ֣ם בֶּעָנָ֣ן יוֹמָ֑ם וְכׇל־הַ֝לַּ֗יְלָה בְּא֣וֹר אֵֽשׁ׃	In the daytime also he led them with a cloud, and all the night with a light of fire.	καὶ ὡδήγησεν αὐτοὺς ἐν νεφέλῃ ἡμέρας καὶ ὅλην τὴν νύκτα ἐν φωτισμῷ πυρός.
15	יְבַקַּ֣ע צֻ֭רִים בַּמִּדְבָּ֑ר וַ֝יַּ֗שְׁקְ כִּתְהֹמ֥וֹת רַבָּֽה׃	He clave the rocks in the wilderness, and gave them drink as out of the great depths.	διέρρηξε πέτραν ἐν ἐρήμῳ καὶ ἐπότισεν αὐτοὺς ὡς ἐν ἀβύσσῳ πολλῇ
16	וַיּוֹצִ֣א נוֹזְלִ֣ים מִסָּ֑לַע וַיּ֖וֹרֶד כַּנְּהָר֣וֹת מָֽיִם׃	He brought streams also out of the rock, and caused waters to run down like rivers.	καὶ ἐξήγαγεν ὕδωρ ἐκ πέτρας καὶ κατήγαγεν ὡς ποταμοὺς ὕδατα.
17	וַיּוֹסִ֣יפוּ ע֭וֹד לַחֲטֹא־ל֑וֹ לַֽמְר֥וֹת עֶ֝לְי֗וֹן בַּצִּיָּֽה׃	And they sinned yet more against him by provoking the most High in the wilderness.	καὶ προσέθεντο ἔτι τοῦ ἁμαρτάνειν αὐτῷ, παρεπίκραναν τὸν ῞Υψιστον ἐν ἀνύδρῳ
18	וַיְנַסּוּ־אֵ֥ל בִּלְבָבָ֑ם לִֽשְׁאׇל־אֹ֥כֶל לְנַפְשָֽׁם׃	And they tempted God in their heart by asking meat for their lust.	καὶ ἐξεπείρασαν τὸν Θεὸν ἐν ταῖς καρδίαις αὐτῶν, τοῦ αἰτῆσαι βρώματα ταῖς ψυχαῖς αὐτῶν
19	וַֽיְדַבְּר֗וּ בֵּאלֹ֫הִ֥ים אָ֭מְרוּ הֲי֣וּכַל אֵ֑ל לַעֲרֹ֥ךְ שֻׁ֝לְחָ֗ן בַּמִּדְבָּֽר׃	Yea, they spake against God; they said, Can God furnish a table in the wilderness?	καὶ κατελάλησαν τοῦ Θεοῦ καὶ εἶπαν· μὴ δυνήσεται ὁ Θεὸς ἑτοιμάσαι τράπεζαν ἐν ἐρήμῳ;
20	הֵ֤ן הִכָּה־צ֨וּר ׀ וַיָּז֣וּבוּ מַיִם֮ וּנְחָלִ֢ים יִ֫שְׁטֹ֥פוּ הֲגַם־לֶ֭חֶם י֣וּכַל תֵּ֑ת אִם־יָכִ֖ין שְׁאֵ֣ר לְעַמּֽוֹ׃	Behold, he smote the rock, that the waters gushed out, and the streams overflowed; can he give bread also? can he provide flesh for his people?	ἐπεὶ ἐπάταξε πέτραν καὶ ἐρρύησαν ὕδατα καὶ χείμαρροι κατεκλύσθησαν, μὴ καὶ ἄρτον δύναται δοῦναι ἢ ἑτοιμάσαι τράπεζαν τῷ λαῷ αὐτοῦ;
21	לָכֵ֤ן ׀ שָׁמַ֥ע יְהֹוָ֗ה וַֽיִּתְעַ֫בָּ֥ר וְ֭אֵשׁ נִשְּׂקָ֣ה בְיַעֲקֹ֑ב וְגַם־אַ֝֗ף עָלָ֥ה בְיִשְׂרָאֵֽל׃	Therefore the LORD heard this, and was wroth: so a fire was kindled against Jacob, and anger also came up against Israel;	διὰ τοῦτο ἤκουσε Κύριος καὶ ἀνεβάλετο, καὶ πῦρ ἀνήφθη ἐν ᾿Ιακώβ, καὶ ὀργὴ ἀνέβη ἐπὶ τὸν ᾿Ισραήλ,
22	כִּ֤י לֹ֣א הֶ֭אֱמִינוּ בֵּאלֹהִ֑ים וְלֹ֥א בָ֝טְח֗וּ בִּישֽׁוּעָתֽוֹ׃	Because they believed not in God, and trusted not in his salvation:	ὅτι οὐκ ἐπίστευσαν ἐν τῷ Θεῷ οὐδὲ ἤλπισαν ἐπὶ τὸ σωτήριον αὐτοῦ.
23	וַיְצַ֣ו שְׁחָקִ֣ים מִמָּ֑עַל וְדַלְתֵ֖י שָׁמַ֣יִם פָּתָֽח׃	Though he had commanded the clouds from above, and opened the doors of heaven,	καὶ ἐνετείλατο νεφέλαις ὑπεράνωθεν καὶ θύρας οὐρανοῦ ἀνέῳξε
24	וַיַּמְטֵ֬ר עֲלֵיהֶ֣ם מָ֣ן לֶאֱכֹ֑ל וּדְגַן־שָׁ֝מַ֗יִם נָ֣תַן לָֽמוֹ׃	And had rained down manna upon them to eat, and had given them of the corn of heaven.	καὶ ἔβρεξεν αὐτοῖς μάννα φαγεῖν καὶ ἄρτον οὐρανοῦ ἔδωκεν αὐτοῖς·
25	לֶ֣חֶם אַ֭בִּירִים אָ֣כַל אִ֑ישׁ צֵידָ֬ה שָׁלַ֖ח לָהֶ֣ם לָשֹֽׂבַע׃	Man did eat angels' food: he sent them meat to the full.	ἄρτον ἀγγέλων ἔφαγεν ἄνθρωπος, ἐπισιτισμὸν ἀπέστειλεν αὐτοῖς εἰς πλησμονήν.
26	יַסַּ֣ע קָ֭דִים בַּשָּׁמָ֑יִם וַיְנַהֵ֖ג בְּעֻזּ֣וֹ תֵימָֽן׃	He caused an east wind to blow in the heaven: and by his power he brought in the south wind.	ἀπῇρε Νότον ἐξ οὐρανοῦ καὶ ἐπήγαγεν ἐν τῇ δυνάμει αὐτοῦ Λίβα
27	וַיַּמְטֵ֬ר עֲלֵיהֶ֣ם כֶּעָפָ֣ר שְׁאֵ֑ר וּֽכְח֥וֹל יַ֝מִּ֗ים ע֣וֹף כָּנָֽף׃	He rained flesh also upon them as dust, and feathered fowls like as the sand of the sea:	καὶ ἔβρεξεν ἐπ᾿ αὐτοὺς ὡσεὶ χοῦν σάρκας καὶ ὡσεὶ ἄμμον θαλασσῶν πετεινὰ πτερωτά,
28	וַ֭יַּפֵּל בְּקֶ֣רֶב מַחֲנֵ֑הוּ סָ֝בִ֗יב לְמִשְׁכְּנֹתָֽיו׃	And he let it fall in the midst of their camp, round about their habitations.	καὶ ἐπέπεσον ἐν μέσῳ παρεμβολῆς αὐτῶν κύκλῳ τῶν σκηνωμάτων αὐτῶν,
29	וַיֹּאכְל֣וּ וַיִּשְׂבְּע֣וּ מְאֹ֑ד וְ֝תַאֲוָתָ֗ם יָבִ֥א לָהֶֽם׃	So they did eat, and were well filled: for he gave them their own desire;	καὶ ἔφαγον καὶ ἐνεπλήσθησαν σφόδρα, καὶ τὴν ἐπιθυμίαν αὐτῶν ἤνεγκεν αὐτοῖς,
30	לֹא־זָ֥רוּ מִתַּאֲוָתָ֑ם ע֝֗וֹד אׇכְלָ֥ם בְּפִיהֶֽם׃	They were not estranged from their lust. But while their meat was yet in their mouths,	οὐκ ἐστερήθησαν ἀπὸ τῆς ἐπιθυμίας αὐτῶν. ἔτι τῆς βρώσεως οὔσης ἐν τῷ στόματι αὐτῶν,
31	וְאַ֤ף אֱלֹהִ֨ים ׀ עָ֘לָ֤ה בָהֶ֗ם וַֽ֭יַּהֲרֹג בְּמִשְׁמַנֵּיהֶ֑ם וּבַחוּרֵ֖י יִשְׂרָאֵ֣ל הִכְרִֽיעַ׃	The wrath of God came upon them, and slew the fattest of them, and smote down the chosen men of Israel.	καὶ ἡ ὀργὴ τοῦ Θεοῦ ἀνέβη ἐπ᾿ αὐτούς, καὶ ἀπέκτεινεν ἐν τοῖς πλείοσιν αὐτῶν, καὶ τοὺς ἐκλεκτοὺς τοῦ ᾿Ισραὴλ συνεπόδισεν.
32	בְּכׇל־זֹ֥את חָֽטְאוּ־ע֑וֹד וְלֹֽא־הֶ֝אֱמִ֗ינוּ בְּנִפְלְאוֹתָֽיו׃	For all this they sinned still, and believed not for his wondrous works.	ἐν πᾶσι τούτοις ἥμαρτον ἔτι καὶ οὐκ ἐπίστευσαν ἐν τοῖς θαυμασίοις αὐτοῦ,
33	וַיְכַל־בַּהֶ֥בֶל יְמֵיהֶ֑ם וּ֝שְׁנוֹתָ֗ם בַּבֶּהָלָֽה׃	Therefore their days did he consume in vanity, and their years in trouble.	καὶ ἐξέλιπον ἐν ματαιότητι αἱ ἡμέραι αὐτῶν καὶ τὰ ἔτη αὐτῶν μετὰ σπουδῆς.
34	אִם־הֲרָגָ֥ם וּדְרָשׁ֑וּהוּ וְ֝שָׁ֗בוּ וְשִֽׁחֲרוּ־אֵֽל׃	When he slew them, then they sought him: and they returned and enquired early after God.	ὅταν ἀπέκτειναν αὐτούς, τότε ἐξεζήτουν αὐτὸν καὶ ἐπέστρεφον καὶ ὤρθριζον πρὸς τὸν Θεὸν
35	וַֽ֭יִּזְכְּרוּ כִּֽי־אֱלֹהִ֣ים צוּרָ֑ם וְאֵ֥ל עֶ֝לְי֗וֹן גֹּאֲלָֽם׃	And they remembered that God was their rock, and the high God their redeemer.	καὶ ἐμνήσθησαν ὅτι ὁ Θεὸς βοηθὸς αὐτῶν ἐστι καὶ ὁ Θεὸς ὁ ῞Υψιστος λυτρωτὴς αὐτῶν ἐστι.
36	וַיְפַתּ֥וּהוּ בְּפִיהֶ֑ם וּ֝בִלְשׁוֹנָ֗ם יְכַזְּבוּ־לֽוֹ׃	Nevertheless they did flatter him with their mouth, and they lied unto him with their tongues.	καὶ ἠγάπησαν αὐτὸν ἐν τῷ στόματι αὐτῶν καὶ τῇ γλώσσῃ αὐτῶν ἐψεύσαντο αὐτῷ,
37	וְ֭לִבָּם לֹא־נָכ֣וֹן עִמּ֑וֹ וְלֹ֥א נֶ֝אֶמְנ֗וּ בִּבְרִיתֽוֹ׃	For their heart was not right with him, neither were they stedfast in his covenant.	ἡ δὲ καρδία αὐτῶν οὐκ εὐθεῖα μετ᾿ αὐτοῦ, οὐδὲ ἐπιστώθησαν ἐν τῇ διαθήκῃ αὐτοῦ.
38	וְה֤וּא רַח֨וּם ׀ יְכַפֵּ֥ר עָוֺן֮ וְֽלֹא־יַֽ֫שְׁחִ֥ית וְ֭הִרְבָּה לְהָשִׁ֣יב אַפּ֑וֹ וְלֹא־יָ֝עִ֗יר כׇּל־חֲמָתֽוֹ׃	But he, being full of compassion, forgave their iniquity, and destroyed them not: yea, many a time turned he his anger away, and did not stir up all his wrath.	αὐτὸς δέ ἐστιν οἰκτίρμων καὶ ἱλάσκεται ταῖς ἁμαρτίαις αὐτῶν καὶ οὐ διαφθερεῖ καὶ πληθυνεῖ τοῦ ἀποστρέψαι τὸν θυμὸν αὐτοῦ καὶ οὐχὶ ἐκκαύσει πᾶσαν τὴν ὀργὴν αὐτοῦ.
39	וַ֭יִּזְכֹּר כִּֽי־בָשָׂ֣ר הֵ֑מָּה ר֥וּחַ ה֝וֹלֵ֗ךְ וְלֹ֣א יָשֽׁוּב׃	For he remembered that they were but flesh; a wind that passeth away, and cometh not again.	καὶ ἐμνήσθη ὅτι σάρξ εἰσι, πνεῦμα πορευόμενον καὶ οὐκ ἐπιστρέφον.
40	כַּ֭מָּה יַמְר֣וּהוּ בַמִּדְבָּ֑ר יַ֝עֲצִיב֗וּהוּ בִּישִׁימֽוֹן׃	How oft did they provoke him in the wilderness, and grieve him in the desert!	ποσάκις παρεπίκραναν αὐτὸν ἐν τῇ ἐρήμῳ, παρώργισαν αὐτὸν ἐν γῇ ἀνύδρῳ;
41	וַיָּשׁ֣וּבוּ וַיְנַסּ֣וּ אֵ֑ל וּקְד֖וֹשׁ יִשְׂרָאֵ֣ל הִתְוֽוּ׃	Yea, they turned back and tempted God, and limited the Holy One of Israel.	καὶ ἐπέστρεψαν καὶ ἐπείρασαν τὸν Θεὸν καὶ τὸν ἅγιον τοῦ ᾿Ισραὴλ παρώξυναν.
42	לֹא־זָכְר֥וּ אֶת־יָד֑וֹ י֝֗וֹם אֲֽשֶׁר־פָּדָ֥ם מִנִּי־צָֽר׃	They remembered not his hand, nor the day when he delivered them from the enemy.	καὶ οὐκ ἐμνήσθησαν τῆς χειρὸς αὐτοῦ, ἡμέρας, ἧς ἐλυτρώσατο αὐτοὺς ἐκ χειρὸς θλίβοντος,
43	אֲשֶׁר־שָׂ֣ם בְּ֭מִצְרַיִם אֹתוֹתָ֑יו וּ֝מוֹפְתָ֗יו בִּשְׂדֵה־צֹֽעַן׃	How he had wrought his signs in Egypt, and his wonders in the field of Zoan.	ὡς ἔθετο ἐν Αἰγύπτῳ τὰ σημεῖα αὐτοῦ καὶ τὰ τέρατα αὐτοῦ ἐν πεδίῳ Τάνεως.
44	וַיַּהֲפֹ֣ךְ לְ֭דָם יְאֹרֵיהֶ֑ם וְ֝נֹזְלֵיהֶ֗ם בַּל־יִשְׁתָּיֽוּן׃	And had turned their rivers into blood; and their floods, that they could not drink.	καὶ μετέστρεψεν εἰς αἷμα τοὺς ποταμοὺς αὐτῶν καὶ τὰ ὀμβρήματα αὐτῶν, ὅπως μὴ πίωσιν·
45	יְשַׁלַּ֬ח בָּהֶ֣ם עָ֭רֹב וַיֹּאכְלֵ֑ם וּ֝צְפַרְדֵּ֗עַ וַתַּשְׁחִיתֵֽם׃	He sent divers sorts of flies among them, which devoured them; and frogs, which destroyed them.	ἐξαπέστειλεν εἰς αὐτοὺς κυνόμυιαν, καὶ κατέφαγεν αὐτούς, καὶ βάτραχον, καὶ διέφθειρεν αὐτούς·
46	וַיִּתֵּ֣ן לֶחָסִ֣יל יְבוּלָ֑ם וִ֝יגִיעָ֗ם לָאַרְבֶּֽה׃	He gave also their increase unto the caterpiller, and their labour unto the locust.	καὶ ἔδωκε τῇ ἐρυσίβῃ τοὺς καρποὺς αὐτῶν καὶ τοὺς πόνους αὐτῶν τῇ ἀκρίδι·
47	יַהֲרֹ֣ג בַּבָּרָ֣ד גַּפְנָ֑ם וְ֝שִׁקְמוֹתָ֗ם בַּחֲנָמַֽל׃	He destroyed their vines with hail, and their sycomore trees with frost.	ἀπέκτεινεν ἐν χαλάζῃ τὴν ἄμπελον αὐτῶν καὶ τὰς συκαμίνους αὐτῶν ἐν τῇ πάχνῃ·
48	וַיַּסְגֵּ֣ר לַבָּרָ֣ד בְּעִירָ֑ם וּ֝מִקְנֵיהֶ֗ם לָרְשָׁפִֽים׃	He gave up their cattle also to the hail, and their flocks to hot thunderbolts.	καὶ παρέδωκεν εἰς χάλαζαν τὰ κτήνη αὐτῶν καὶ τὴν ὕπαρξιν αὐτῶν τῷ πυρί·
49	יְשַׁלַּח־בָּ֨ם ׀ חֲר֬וֹן אַפּ֗וֹ עֶבְרָ֣ה וָזַ֣עַם וְצָרָ֑ה מִ֝שְׁלַ֗חַת מַלְאֲכֵ֥י רָעִֽים׃	He cast upon them the fierceness of his anger, wrath, and indignation, and trouble, by sending evil angels among them.	ἐξαπέστειλεν εἰς αὐτοὺς ὀργὴν θυμοῦ αὐτοῦ, θυμὸν καὶ ὀργὴν καὶ θλῖψιν, ἀποστολὴν δι᾿ ἀγγέλων πονηρῶν.
50	יְפַלֵּ֥ס נָתִ֗יב לְאַ֫פּ֥וֹ לֹא־חָשַׂ֣ךְ מִמָּ֣וֶת נַפְשָׁ֑ם וְ֝חַיָּתָ֗ם לַדֶּ֥בֶר הִסְגִּֽיר׃	He made a way to his anger; he spared not their soul from death, but gave their life over to the pestilence;	ὡδοποίησε τρίβον τῇ ὀργῇ αὐτοῦ καὶ οὐκ ἐφείσατο ἀπὸ θανάτου τῶν ψυχῶν αὐτῶν καὶ τὰ κτήνη αὐτῶν εἰς θάνατον συνέκλεισε
51	וַיַּ֣ךְ כׇּל־בְּכ֣וֹר בְּמִצְרָ֑יִם רֵאשִׁ֥ית א֝וֹנִ֗ים בְּאׇהֳלֵי־חָֽם׃	And smote all the firstborn in Egypt; the chief of their strength in the tabernacles of Ham:	καὶ ἐπάταξε πᾶν πρωτότοκον ἐν γῇ Αἰγύπτῳ, ἀπαρχὴν παντὸς πόνου αὐτῶν ἐν τοῖς σκηνώμασι Χάμ,
52	וַיַּסַּ֣ע כַּצֹּ֣אן עַמּ֑וֹ וַֽיְנַהֲגֵ֥ם כַּ֝עֵ֗דֶר בַּמִּדְבָּֽר׃	But made his own people to go forth like sheep, and guided them in the wilderness like a flock.	καὶ ἀπῇρεν ὡς πρόβατα τὸν λαὸν αὐτοῦ καὶ ἀνήγαγεν αὐτοὺς ὡσεὶ ποίμνιον ἐν ἐρήμῳ
53	וַיַּנְחֵ֣ם לָ֭בֶטַח וְלֹ֣א פָחָ֑דוּ וְאֶת־א֝וֹיְבֵיהֶ֗ם כִּסָּ֥ה הַיָּֽם׃	And he led them on safely, so that they feared not: but the sea overwhelmed their enemies.	καὶ ὡδήγησεν αὐτοὺς ἐπ᾿ ἐλπίδι, καὶ οὐκ ἐδειλίασαν, καὶ τοὺς ἐχθροὺς αὐτῶν ἐκάλυψε θάλασσα.
54	וַ֭יְבִיאֵם אֶל־גְּב֣וּל קׇדְשׁ֑וֹ הַר־זֶ֝֗ה קָנְתָ֥ה יְמִינֽוֹ׃	And he brought them to the border of his sanctuary, even to this mountain, which his right hand had purchased.	καὶ εἰσήγαγεν αὐτοὺς εἰς ὄρος ἁγιάσματος αὐτοῦ, ὄρος τοῦτο, ὃ ἐκτήσατο ἡ δεξιὰ αὐτοῦ,
55	וַיְגָ֤רֶשׁ מִפְּנֵיהֶ֨ם ׀ גּוֹיִ֗ם וַֽ֭יַּפִּילֵם בְּחֶ֣בֶל נַחֲלָ֑ה וַיַּשְׁכֵּ֥ן בְּ֝אׇהֳלֵיהֶ֗ם שִׁבְטֵ֥י יִשְׂרָאֵֽל׃	He cast out the heathen also before them, and divided them an inheritance by line, and made the tribes of Israel to dwell in their tents.	καὶ ἐξέβαλεν ἀπὸ προσώπου αὐτῶν ἔθνη καὶ ἐκληροδότησεν αὐτοὺς ἐν σχοινίῳ κληροδοσίας καὶ κατεσκήνωσεν ἐν τοῖς σκηνώμασιν αὐτῶν τὰς φυλὰς τοῦ ᾿Ισραήλ.
56	וַיְנַסּ֣וּ וַ֭יַּמְרוּ אֶת־אֱלֹהִ֣ים עֶלְי֑וֹן וְ֝עֵדוֹתָ֗יו לֹ֣א שָׁמָֽרוּ׃	Yet they tempted and provoked the most high God, and kept not his testimonies:	καὶ ἐπείρασαν καὶ παρεπίκραναν τὸν Θεὸν τὸν ῞Υψιστον καὶ τὰ μαρτύρια αὐτοῦ οὐκ ἐφυλάξαντο
57	וַיִּסֹּ֣גוּ וַֽ֭יִּבְגְּדוּ כַּאֲבוֹתָ֑ם נֶ֝הְפְּכ֗וּ כְּקֶ֣שֶׁת רְמִיָּֽה׃	But turned back, and dealt unfaithfully like their fathers: they were turned aside like a deceitful bow.	καὶ ἀπέστρεψαν καὶ ἠθέτησαν, καθὼς καὶ οἱ πατέρες αὐτῶν, μετεστράφησαν εἰς τόξον στρεβλὸν
58	וַיַּכְעִיס֥וּהוּ בְּבָמוֹתָ֑ם וּ֝בִפְסִילֵיהֶ֗ם יַקְנִיאֽוּהוּ׃	For they provoked him to anger with their high places, and moved him to jealousy with their graven images.	καὶ παρώργισαν αὐτὸν ἐν τοῖς βουνοῖς αὐτῶν, καὶ ἐν τοῖς γλυπτοῖς αὐτῶν παρεζήλωσαν αὐτόν.
59	שָׁמַ֣ע אֱ֭לֹהִים וַֽיִּתְעַבָּ֑ר וַיִּמְאַ֥ס מְ֝אֹ֗ד בְּיִשְׂרָאֵֽל׃	When God heard this, he was wroth, and greatly abhorred Israel:	ἤκουσεν ὁ Θεὸς καὶ ὑπερεῖδε καὶ ἐξουδένωσε σφόδρα τὸν ᾿Ισραήλ.
60	וַ֭יִּטֹּשׁ מִשְׁכַּ֣ן שִׁל֑וֹ אֹ֝֗הֶל שִׁכֵּ֥ן בָּֽאָדָֽם׃	So that he forsook the tabernacle of Shiloh, the tent which he placed among men;	καὶ ἀπώσατο τὴν σκηνὴν Σιλώμ, σκήνωμα, ὃ κατεσκήνωσεν ἐν ἀνθρώποις.
61	וַיִּתֵּ֣ן לַשְּׁבִ֣י עֻזּ֑וֹ וְֽתִפְאַרְתּ֥וֹ בְיַד־צָֽר׃	And delivered his strength into captivity, and his glory into the enemy's hand.	καὶ παρέδωκεν εἰς αἰχμαλωσίαν τὴν ἰσχὺν αὐτῶν καὶ τὴν καλλονὴν αὐτῶν εἰς χεῖρα ἐχθρῶν
62	וַיַּסְגֵּ֣ר לַחֶ֣רֶב עַמּ֑וֹ וּ֝בְנַחֲלָת֗וֹ הִתְעַבָּֽר׃	He gave his people over also unto the sword; and was wroth with his inheritance.	καὶ συνέκλεισεν ἐν ῥομφαίᾳ τὸν λαὸν αὐτοῦ καὶ τὴν κληρονομίαν αὐτοῦ ὑπερεῖδε.
63	בַּחוּרָ֥יו אָכְלָה־אֵ֑שׁ וּ֝בְתוּלֹתָ֗יו לֹ֣א הוּלָּֽלוּ׃	The fire consumed their young men; and their maidens were not given to marriage.	τοὺς νεανίσκους αὐτῶν κατέφαγε πῦρ, καὶ αἱ παρθένοι αὐτῶν οὐκ ἐπενθήθησαν·
64	כֹּ֭הֲנָיו בַּחֶ֣רֶב נָפָ֑לוּ וְ֝אַלְמְנֹתָ֗יו לֹ֣א תִבְכֶּֽינָה׃	Their priests fell by the sword; and their widows made no lamentation.	οἱ ἱερεῖς αὐτῶν ἐν ρομφαίᾳ ἔπεσον, καὶ αἱ χῆραι αὐτῶν οὐ κλαυθήσονται.
65	וַיִּקַ֖ץ כְּיָשֵׁ֥ן ׀ אֲדֹנָ֑י כְּ֝גִבּ֗וֹר מִתְרוֹנֵ֥ן מִיָּֽיִן׃	Then the LORD awaked as one out of sleep, and like a mighty man that shouteth by reason of wine.	καὶ ἐξηγέρθη ὡς ὁ ὑπνῶν Κύριος, ὡς δυνατὸς κεκραιπαληκὼς ἐξ οἴνου,
66	וַיַּךְ־צָרָ֥יו אָח֑וֹר חֶרְפַּ֥ת ע֝וֹלָ֗ם נָ֣תַן לָֽמוֹ׃	And he smote his enemies in the hinder parts: he put them to a perpetual reproach.	καὶ ἐπάταξε τοὺς ἐχθροὺς αὐτοῦ εἰς τὰ ὀπίσω, ὄνειδος αἰώνιον ἔδωκεν αὐτοῖς.
67	וַ֭יִּמְאַס בְּאֹ֣הֶל יוֹסֵ֑ף וּֽבְשֵׁ֥בֶט אֶ֝פְרַ֗יִם לֹ֣א בָחָֽר׃	Moreover he refused the tabernacle of Joseph, and chose not the tribe of Ephraim:	καὶ ἀπώσατο τὸ σκήνωμα ᾿Ιωσὴφ καὶ τὴν φυλὴν ᾿Εφραὶμ οὐκ ἐξελέξατο·
68	וַ֭יִּבְחַר אֶת־שֵׁ֣בֶט יְהוּדָ֑ה אֶֽת־הַ֥ר צִ֝יּ֗וֹן אֲשֶׁ֣ר אָהֵֽב׃	But chose the tribe of Judah, the mount Zion which he loved.	καὶ ἐξελέξατο τὴν φυλὴν ᾿Ιούδα, τὸ ὄρος τὸ Σιών, ὃ ἠγάπησε,
69	וַיִּ֣בֶן כְּמוֹ־רָ֭מִים מִקְדָּשׁ֑וֹ כְּ֝אֶ֗רֶץ יְסָדָ֥הּ לְעוֹלָֽם׃	And he built his sanctuary like high palaces, like the earth which he hath established for ever.	καὶ ᾠκοδόμησεν ὡς μονοκέρωτος τὸ ἁγίασμα αὐτοῦ, ἐν τῇ γῇ ἐθεμελίωσεν αὐτὴν εἰς τὸν αἰῶνα.
70	וַ֭יִּבְחַר בְּדָוִ֣ד עַבְדּ֑וֹ וַ֝יִּקָּחֵ֗הוּ מִֽמִּכְלְאֹ֥ת צֹֽאן׃	He chose David also his servant, and took him from the sheepfolds:	καὶ ἐξελέξατο Δαυΐδ τὸν δοῦλον αὐτοῦ καὶ ἀνέλαβεν αὐτὸν ἐκ τῶν ποιμνίων τῶν προβάτων,
71	מֵאַחַ֥ר עָל֗וֹת הֱבִ֫יא֥וֹ לִ֭רְעוֹת בְּיַֽעֲקֹ֣ב עַמּ֑וֹ וּ֝בְיִשְׂרָאֵ֗ל נַחֲלָתֽוֹ׃	From following the ewes great with young he brought him to feed Jacob his people, and Israel his inheritance.	ἐξόπισθεν τῶν λοχευομένων ἔλαβεν αὐτόν ποιμαίνειν ᾿Ιακὼβ τὸν δοῦλον αὐτοῦ καὶ ᾿Ισραὴλ τὴν κληρονομίαν αὐτοῦ
72	וַ֭יִּרְעֵם כְּתֹ֣ם לְבָב֑וֹ וּבִתְבוּנ֖וֹת כַּפָּ֣יו יַנְחֵֽם׃	So he fed them according to the integrity of his heart; and guided them by the skilfulness of his hands.	καὶ ἐποίμανεν αὐτοὺς ἐν τῇ ἀκακίᾳ τῆς καρδίας αὐτοῦ, καὶ ἐν τῇ συνέσει τῶν χειρῶν αὐτοῦ ὡδήγησεν αὐτούς.

== See also ==
- The Exodus
- Ipuwer Papyrus
- Passover
- Plagues of Egypt
- Sources and parallels of the Exodus
- Stations of the Exodus
- Related Bible passages: Va'eira, Bo (parsha), and Beshalach: Torah portions (parashot) telling the Exodus story; Psalm 105
