= Psalm 107 =

107th psalm of the Book of Psalms

- "O give thanks unto the LORD, for he is good"
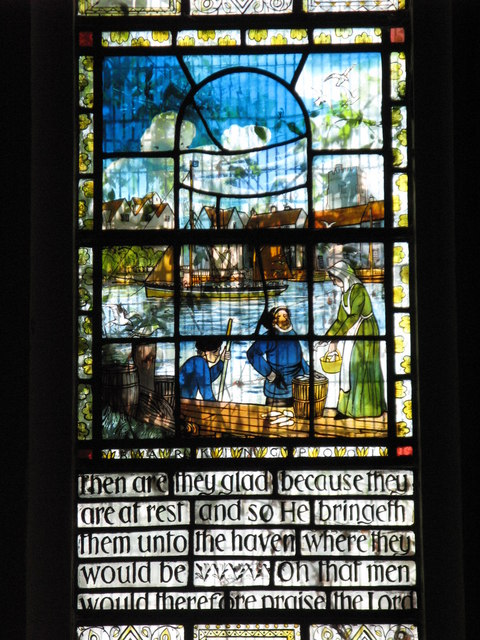
- Verses 30-31 quoted in the window of St. Margaret's Church, Barking Abbey
- Other name: Psalm 106; "Confitemini Domino quoniam bonus"
- Language: Hebrew (original)

Psalm 107
- ← Psalm 106 Psalm 108 →
- Book: Book of Psalms
- Hebrew Bible part: Ketuvim
- Order in the Hebrew part: 1
- Category: Sifrei Emet
- Christian Bible part: Old Testament
- Order in the Christian part: 19

Psalm 107 is the 107th psalm of the Book of Psalms, beginning in English in the King James Version: "O give thanks unto the LORD, for he is good: for his mercy endureth for ever.". The Book of Psalms is part of the third section of the Hebrew Bible, and a book of the Christian Old Testament. In the slightly different numbering system used in the Greek Septuagint and Latin Vulgate translations of the Bible, this psalm is Psalm 106. In Latin, it is known by the incipit, "Confitemini Domino quoniam bonus". It is the first psalm of Book 5 of the Hebrew psalter. Alexander Kirkpatrick notes that this psalm and the previous one, Psalm 106, "are closely connected together", arguing that "the division of the fourth and fifth books does not correspond to any difference of source or character, as is the case in the other books". Psalm 107 is a song of thanksgiving to God, who has been merciful to his people and gathered all who were lost. It is beloved of mariners due to its reference to ships and the sea (v. 23).

Psalm 107 is used in both Jewish and Christian liturgies. It has been paraphrased in hymns, and set to music, including George Dyson's Choral Symphony and Mendelssohn's Lobgesang.

== Structure ==
Psalm 107 is divided into 43 verses and is one of the longer psalms in the Bible. In the Revised Standard Version (RSV), it is split into seven sections, each section having a related but distinct theme. The first section, the shortest, comprises verses 1–3, a "general introduction"; the second, verses 4–9; the third, verses 10–16; the fourth, verses 17–22; the fifth, verses 23–32; the sixth, verses 33–38; and the seventh and final, verses 39–43. An interesting feature of Psalm 107 commonly found in the poetic books of the Bible is its overall regularity. The line lengths are different, but the size of the original sectional divisions is pleasingly even. The theme of the psalm moves forward from section to section. In the Masoretic Hebrew text, there are seven inverted nuns (׆).

The words Oh, that men would give thanks to the Lord for His goodness, and for His wonderful works to the children of men! appear as a refrain in verses 8, 15, 21 and 31.

== Dating ==
The Psalms date from anywhere between the 15th - 13th century BC and 400 BC. Although the exact timing of the writing of Psalm 107 is uncertain, it was most likely written during a time of increased union among the Jewish people during the reign of King David (1010-970 BC).

== General theme ==
Overall, Psalm 107 is considered one of Israel's historical psalms, along with Psalm 106 and many of the royal psalms, among others. The overall outline of the historical psalms is to tell a story of a God who accomplishes "wonderful works" (verse 8), although the Israelites, His chosen people, have proved faithless. In the psalmist's assessment, acts of infidelity often seem to correspond to an eventual awe-inspiring work of mercy from the Lord. The psalm also includes several more specific themes which emphasize the general tone of praise and thanksgiving for the God of Israel.

=== Directional theme ===
In the introduction, the first section of Psalm 107, the Lord is said to gather "the redeemed ... from the east and from the west, from the north and from the south" (v. 2, 3). Following this, the next four sections address individuals who "wandered in desert wastes", "sat in darkness and gloom", "were sick through their sinful ways", and "went down to the sea in ships" (v. 4, 10, 17, 23). Each of these locational descriptors corresponds to a cardinal direction as mentioned in the third verse of the psalm. The desert wastes mentioned in the second section of the psalm seem to indicate a "great, eastern desert" that might be beat down upon by the sun, which rises in the east. Likewise, in the opposing, western direction, where the sun sets, the Israelites are said to sit "in darkness and gloom" (v. 10). The correlation depicted in this section between darkness and helplessness - apart from the aid of the Lord - harkens back to Old Testament descriptions of Abraham (Genesis 15:12). Throughout early Hebrew history, north was thought to be the direction most associated with evil and iniquity, thus adding emphasis to the direction of north's correspondence to the fourth stanza, beginning with "some were sick through their sinful ways, and because of their iniquities suffered affliction" (v. 17). And finally, in the orientation of the region that Israel occupied at the time of Psalm 107, to the south lay the sea, directly paralleling the beginning of the fifth section, "some went down to the sea in ships" (v. 23).

== Message ==
Psalm 107 is, above all, a hymn commemorating the power of God. Despite the transgressions of the Israelites, the Lord forgives them. The psalm elaborates on this theme, going on to say that the Lord "turns a desert into pools of water ... and there he lets the hungry dwell" (v. 35, 36). This description of miracles as performed by the Lord reinforces the imagery of "wonderful works" mentioned earlier in the psalm (v. 8). The works of the Lord, however, are mentioned in many psalms; what makes Psalm 107 somewhat unusual is its depiction of the works of the Lord as explication for the people. The psalm is a hymn of thanksgiving to the Lord "for the purpose of making [the Lord’s works] known to humankind, so that they too can join in the praise of [the Lord]". This concept seems to indicate that David has written a sort of circulatory hymn thanking the Lord for enabling the Israelites to thank the Lord. These concordant themes of enlightenment and gratitude reinforce each other throughout the psalm, and, indeed, throughout the rest of the fifth book of psalms, of which Psalm 107 is the opening hymn.

Kirkpatrick argues that "the men" called upon to rejoice by verses 8, 15, 21 and 31 are not people in general but specifically those whose deliverance has previously been described (those who "wandered in the wilderness in a desolate way", verse 4, etc.)

== Relevance in the New Testament ==
As with much of the Old Testament, many Christians understand Psalm 107 to foreshadow an event recorded in the New Testament. A famous account of the life of Christ from chapter four of Mark's Gospel follows the fifth section of Psalm 107, which describes the plight and eventual rescue of those on the sea. In Mark's biography of Jesus, while he and his disciples are on Lake Galilee in a boat, a storm swells. Jesus calms the storm by saying, "Peace! Be still!" (Mark 4:39). In the same way, Psalm 107 describes the Israelites at sea when a storm arises. The waves "mounted up to heaven, they went down to the depths", (v. 26) and the Lord then "makes still" (v. 29) the storm. The language of both passages is similar, supporting the mirrored imagery and situation that the stories share. The divine being who calms the storm is also the same according to the Christian tradition: the Lord, whether Father, Son, or Holy Spirit, is one being. Verse 9 is quoted in Mary's song of praise, the Magnificat, in Luke 1:53

== Significance in tradition ==
Psalm 107 forms the opening piece of the modern liturgy for Israel Independence Day found in Religious-Zionist Jewish prayer books. It is also used within the Roman Catholic faith as a part of the Mass. In the Roman Catholic Mass, selections from Psalm 107 are read on various occasions throughout the year, with the most common occurrence being during the hymn between the first and second readings. It is often quoted at events involving the navy and seafarers, such as the launching of ships.

== Musical settings ==
Verse 1 of Psalm 107 is the text for a round in German, "Danket, danket dem Herrn", with traditional music from the 18th century. The psalm inspired William Whiting's hymn "Eternal Father, Strong to Save".

Heinrich Schütz composed a four-part setting to a metric German text, "Danket dem Herren, unserm Gott", SVW 205, for the 1628 Becker Psalter. George Dyson chose verses from the psalm as the text for his Choral Symphony, "Psalm CVII". Verses were used as the text of movement 3 of Mendelssohn's Lobgesang.

== Text ==
The following table shows the Hebrew text of the Psalm with vowels, alongside the Koine Greek text in the Septuagint and the English translation from the King James Version. Note that the meaning can slightly differ between these versions, as the Septuagint and the Masoretic Text come from different textual traditions. (Note: A 1917 translation directly from Hebrew to English by the Jewish Publication Society can be found here or here, and an 1844 translation directly from the Septuagint by L. C. L. Brenton can be found here. Both translations are in the public domain.) In the Septuagint, this psalm is numbered Psalm 106.

#	Hebrew	English	Greek
1	הֹד֣וּ לַיהֹוָ֣ה כִּי־ט֑וֹב כִּ֖י לְעוֹלָ֣ם חַסְדּֽוֹ׃	O give thanks unto the LORD, for he is good: for his mercy endureth for ever.	᾿Αλληλούϊα. - ΕΞΟΜΟΛΟΓΕΙΣΘΕ τῷ Κυρίῳ, ὅτι χρηστός, ὅτι εἰς τὸν αἰῶνα τὸ ἔλεος αὐτοῦ·
2	יֹ֭אמְרוּ גְּאוּלֵ֣י יְהֹוָ֑ה אֲשֶׁ֥ר גְּ֝אָלָ֗ם מִיַּד־צָֽר׃	Let the redeemed of the LORD say so, whom he hath redeemed from the hand of the enemy;	εἰπάτωσαν οἱ λελυτρωμένοι ὑπὸ Κυρίου, οὓς ἐλυτρώσατο ἐκ χειρὸς ἐχθροῦ.
3	וּֽמֵאֲרָצ֗וֹת קִ֫בְּצָ֥ם מִמִּזְרָ֥ח וּמִֽמַּעֲרָ֑ב מִצָּפ֥וֹן וּמִיָּֽם׃	And gathered them out of the lands, from the east, and from the west, from the north, and from the south.	ἐκ τῶν χωρῶν συνήγαγεν αὐτούς, ἀπὸ ἀνατολῶν καὶ δυσμῶν καὶ βοῤῥᾶ καὶ θαλάσσης.
4	תָּע֣וּ בַ֭מִּדְבָּר בִּישִׁימ֣וֹן דָּ֑רֶךְ עִ֥יר מ֝וֹשָׁ֗ב לֹ֣א מָצָֽאוּ׃	They wandered in the wilderness in a solitary way; they found no city to dwell in.	ἐπλανήθησαν ἐν τῇ ἐρήμῳ ἐν γῇ ἀνύδρῳ, ὁδὸν πόλεως κατοικητηρίου οὐχ εὗρον,
5	רְעֵבִ֥ים גַּם־צְמֵאִ֑ים נַ֝פְשָׁ֗ם בָּהֶ֥ם תִּתְעַטָּֽף׃	Hungry and thirsty, their soul fainted in them.	πεινῶντες καὶ διψῶντες, ἡ ψυχὴ αὐτῶν ἐν αὐτοῖς ἐξέλιπε·
6	וַיִּצְעֲק֣וּ אֶל־יְ֭הֹוָה בַּצַּ֣ר לָהֶ֑ם מִ֝מְּצ֥וּקוֹתֵיהֶ֗ם יַצִּילֵֽם׃	Then they cried unto the LORD in their trouble, and he delivered them out of their distresses.	καὶ ἐκέκραξαν πρὸς Κύριον ἐν τῷ θλίβεσθαι αὐτούς, καὶ ἐκ τῶν ἀναγκῶν αὐτῶν ἐῤῥύσατο αὐτοὺς
7	וַֽ֭יַּדְרִיכֵם בְּדֶ֣רֶךְ יְשָׁרָ֑ה לָ֝לֶ֗כֶת אֶל־עִ֥יר מוֹשָֽׁב׃	And he led them forth by the right way, that they might go to a city of habitation.	καὶ ὡδήγησεν αὐτοὺς εἰς ὁδὸν εὐθεῖαν τοῦ πορευθῆναι εἰς πόλιν κατοικητηρίου.
8	יוֹד֣וּ לַיהֹוָ֣ה חַסְדּ֑וֹ וְ֝נִפְלְאוֹתָ֗יו לִבְנֵ֥י אָדָֽם׃	Oh that men would praise the LORD for his goodness, and for his wonderful works to the children of men!	ἐξομολογησάσθωσαν τῷ Κυρίῳ τὰ ἐλέη αὐτοῦ καὶ τὰ θαυμάσια αὐτοῦ τοῖς υἱοῖς τῶν ἀνθρώπων,
9	כִּֽי־הִ֭שְׂבִּיעַ נֶ֣פֶשׁ שֹׁקֵקָ֑ה וְנֶ֥פֶשׁ רְ֝עֵבָ֗ה מִלֵּא־טֽוֹב׃	For he satisfieth the longing soul, and filleth the hungry soul with goodness.	ὅτι ἐχόρτασε ψυχὴν κενὴν καὶ πεινῶσαν ἐνέπλησεν ἀγαθῶν.
10	יֹ֭שְׁבֵי חֹ֣שֶׁךְ וְצַלְמָ֑וֶת אֲסִירֵ֖י עֳנִ֣י וּבַרְזֶֽל׃	Such as sit in darkness and in the shadow of death, being bound in affliction and iron;	καθημένους ἐν σκότει καὶ σκιᾷ θανάτου, πεπεδημένους ἐν πτωχείᾳ καὶ σιδήρῳ,
11	כִּֽי־הִמְר֥וּ אִמְרֵי־אֵ֑ל וַעֲצַ֖ת עֶלְי֣וֹן נָאָֽצוּ׃	Because they rebelled against the words of God, and contemned the counsel of the most High:	ὅτι παρεπίκραναν τὰ λόγια τοῦ Θεοῦ, καὶ τὴν βουλὴν τοῦ ῾Υψίστου παρώξυναν,
12	וַיַּכְנַ֣ע בֶּעָמָ֣ל לִבָּ֑ם כָּ֝שְׁל֗וּ וְאֵ֣ין עֹזֵֽר׃	Therefore he brought down their heart with labour; they fell down, and there was none to help.	καὶ ἐταπεινώθη ἐν κόποις ἡ καρδία αὐτῶν, ἠσθένησαν, καὶ οὐκ ἦν ὁ βοηθῶν·
13	וַיִּזְעֲק֣וּ אֶל־יְ֭הֹוָה בַּצַּ֣ר לָהֶ֑ם מִ֝מְּצֻ֥קוֹתֵיהֶ֗ם יוֹשִׁיעֵֽם׃	Then they cried unto the LORD in their trouble, and he saved them out of their distresses.	καὶ ἐκέκραξαν πρὸς Κύριον ἐν τῷ θλίβεσθαι αὐτούς, καὶ ἐκ τῶν ἀναγκῶν αὐτῶν ἔσωσεν αὐτοὺς
14	י֭וֹצִיאֵם מֵחֹ֣שֶׁךְ וְצַלְמָ֑וֶת וּמוֹסְר֖וֹתֵיהֶ֣ם יְנַתֵּֽק׃	He brought them out of darkness and the shadow of death, and brake their bands in sunder.	καὶ ἐξήγαγεν αὐτοὺς ἐκ σκότους καὶ σκιᾶς θανάτου καὶ τοὺς δεσμοὺς αὐτῶν διέρρηξεν.
15	יוֹד֣וּ לַיהֹוָ֣ה חַסְדּ֑וֹ וְ֝נִפְלְאוֹתָ֗יו לִבְנֵ֥י אָדָֽם׃	15 Oh that men would praise the LORD for his goodness, and for his wonderful works to the children of men!	ἐξομολογησάσθωσαν τῷ Κυρίῳ τὰ ἐλέη αὐτοῦ καὶ τὰ θαυμάσια αὐτοῦ τοῖς υἱοῖς τῶν ἀνθρώπων,
16	כִּֽי־שִׁ֭בַּר דַּלְת֣וֹת נְחֹ֑שֶׁת וּבְרִיחֵ֖י בַרְזֶ֣ל גִּדֵּֽעַ׃	For he hath broken the gates of brass, and cut the bars of iron in sunder.	ὅτι συνέτριψε πύλας χαλκᾶς καὶ μοχλοὺς σιδηροῦς συνέθλασεν.
17	אֱ֭וִלִים מִדֶּ֣רֶךְ פִּשְׁעָ֑ם וּֽ֝מֵעֲוֺ֥נֹתֵיהֶ֗ם יִתְעַנּֽוּ׃	Fools because of their transgression, and because of their iniquities, are afflicted.	ἀντελάβετο αὐτῶν ἐξ ὁδοῦ ἀνομίας αὐτῶν, διὰ γὰρ τὰς ἀνομίας αὐτῶν ἐταπεινώθησαν·
18	כׇּל־אֹ֭כֶל תְּתַעֵ֣ב נַפְשָׁ֑ם וַ֝יַּגִּ֗יעוּ עַד־שַׁ֥עֲרֵי־מָֽוֶת׃	Their soul abhorreth all manner of meat; and they draw near unto the gates of death.	πᾶν βρῶμα ἐβδελύξατο ἡ ψυχὴ αὐτῶν, καὶ ἤγγισαν ἕως τῶν πυλῶν τοῦ θανάτου·
19	וַיִּזְעֲק֣וּ אֶל־יְ֭הֹוָה בַּצַּ֣ר לָהֶ֑ם מִ֝מְּצֻ֥קוֹתֵיהֶ֗ם יוֹשִׁיעֵֽם׃	Then they cry unto the LORD in their trouble, and he saveth them out of their distresses.	καὶ ἐκέκραξαν πρὸς Κύριον ἐν τῷ θλίβεσθαι αὐτούς, καὶ ἐκ τῶν ἀναγκῶν αὐτῶν ἔσωσεν αὐτούς,
20	יִשְׁלַ֣ח דְּ֭בָרוֹ וְיִרְפָּאֵ֑ם וִ֝ימַלֵּ֗ט מִשְּׁחִֽיתוֹתָֽם׃	He sent his word, and healed them, and delivered them from their destructions.	ἀπέστειλε τὸν λόγον αὐτοῦ καὶ ἰάσατο αὐτοὺς καὶ ἐρρύσατο αὐτοὺς ἐκ τῶν διαφθορῶν αὐτῶν.
21	יוֹד֣וּ לַיהֹוָ֣ה חַסְדּ֑וֹ וְ֝נִפְלְאוֹתָ֗יו לִבְנֵ֥י אָדָֽם׃	Oh that men would praise the LORD for his goodness, and for his wonderful works to the children of men!	ἐξομολογησάσθωσαν τῷ Κυρίῳ τὰ ἐλέη αὐτοῦ καὶ τὰ θαυμάσια αὐτοῦ τοῖς υἱοῖς τῶν ἀνθρώπων
22	וְ֭יִזְבְּחוּ זִבְחֵ֣י תוֹדָ֑ה וִיסַפְּר֖וּ מַעֲשָׂ֣יו בְּרִנָּֽה׃	And let them sacrifice the sacrifices of thanksgiving, and declare his works with rejoicing.	καὶ θυσάτωσαν αὐτῷ θυσίαν αἰνέσεως καὶ ἐξαγγειλάτωσαν τὰ ἔργα αὐτοῦ ἐν ἀγαλλιάσει.
23	׆ יוֹרְדֵ֣י הַ֭יָּם בׇּאֳנִיּ֑וֹת עֹשֵׂ֥י מְ֝לָאכָ֗ה בְּמַ֣יִם רַבִּֽים׃	They that go down to the sea in ships, that do business in great waters;	οἱ καταβαίνοντες εἰς θάλασσαν ἐν πλοίοις, ποιοῦντες ἐργασίαν ἐν ὕδασι πολλοῖς,
24	׆ הֵ֣מָּה רָ֭אוּ מַעֲשֵׂ֣י יְהֹוָ֑ה וְ֝נִפְלְאוֹתָ֗יו בִּמְצוּלָֽה׃	These see the works of the LORD, and his wonders in the deep.	αὐτοὶ εἶδον τὰ ἔργα Κυρίου καὶ τὰ θαυμάσια αὐτοῦ ἐν τῷ βυθῷ.
25	׆ וַיֹּ֗אמֶר וַֽ֭יַּעֲמֵד ר֣וּחַ סְעָרָ֑ה וַתְּרוֹמֵ֥ם גַּלָּֽיו׃	For he commandeth, and raiseth the stormy wind, which lifteth up the waves thereof.	εἶπε, καὶ ἔστη πνεῦμα καταιγίδος, καὶ ὑψώθη τὰ κύματα αὐτῆς·
26	׆ יַעֲל֣וּ שָׁ֭מַיִם יֵרְד֣וּ תְהוֹמ֑וֹת נַ֝פְשָׁ֗ם בְּרָעָ֥ה תִתְמוֹגָֽג׃	They mount up to the heaven, they go down again to the depths: their soul is melted because of trouble.	ἀναβαίνουσιν ἕως τῶν οὐρανῶν καὶ καταβαίνουσιν ἕως τῶν ἀβύσσων, ἡ ψυχὴ αὐτῶν ἐν κακοῖς ἐτήκετο·
27	׆ יָח֣וֹגּוּ וְ֭יָנוּעוּ כַּשִּׁכּ֑וֹר וְכׇל־חׇ֝כְמָתָ֗ם תִּתְבַּלָּֽע׃	They reel to and fro, and stagger like a drunken man, and are at their wit's end.	ἐταράχθησαν, ἐσαλεύθησαν ὡς ὁ μεθύων, καὶ πᾶσα ἡ σοφία αὐτῶν κατεπόθη·
28	׆ וַיִּצְעֲק֣וּ אֶל־יְ֭הֹוָה בַּצַּ֣ר לָהֶ֑ם וּֽ֝מִמְּצ֥וּקֹתֵיהֶ֗ם יוֹצִיאֵֽם׃	Then they cry unto the LORD in their trouble, and he bringeth them out of their distresses.	καὶ ἐκέκραξαν πρὸς Κύριον ἐν τῷ θλίβεσθαι αὐτούς, καὶ ἐκ τῶν ἀναγκῶν αὐτῶν ἐξήγαγεν αὐτοὺς
29	יָקֵ֣ם סְ֭עָרָה לִדְמָמָ֑ה וַ֝יֶּחֱשׁ֗וּ גַּלֵּיהֶֽם׃	He maketh the storm a calm, so that the waves thereof are still.	καὶ ἐπέταξε τῇ καταιγίδι, καὶ ἔστη εἰς αὔραν, καὶ ἐσίγησαν τὰ κύματα αὐτῆς·
30	וַיִּשְׂמְח֥וּ כִֽי־יִשְׁתֹּ֑קוּ וַ֝יַּנְחֵ֗ם אֶל־מְח֥וֹז חֶפְצָֽם׃	Then are they glad because they be quiet; so he bringeth them unto their desired haven.	καὶ εὐφράνθησαν, ὅτι ἡσύχασαν, καὶ ὡδήγησεν αὐτοὺς ἐπὶ λιμένα θελήματος αὐτοῦ.
31	יוֹד֣וּ לַיהֹוָ֣ה חַסְדּ֑וֹ וְ֝נִפְלְאוֹתָ֗יו לִבְנֵ֥י אָדָֽם׃	Oh that men would praise the LORD for his goodness, and for his wonderful works to the children of men!	ἐξομολογησάσθωσαν τῷ Κυρίῳ τὰ ἐλέη αὐτοῦ καὶ τὰ θαυμάσια αὐτοῦ τοῖς υἱοῖς τῶν ἀνθρώπων.
32	וִֽ֭ירוֹמְמוּהוּ בִּקְהַל־עָ֑ם וּבְמוֹשַׁ֖ב זְקֵנִ֣ים יְהַלְלֽוּהוּ׃	Let them exalt him also in the congregation of the people, and praise him in the assembly of the elders.	ὑψωσάτωσαν αὐτὸν ἐν ἐκκλησίᾳ λαοῦ καὶ ἐν καθέδρᾳ πρεσβυτέρων αἰνεσάτωσαν αὐτόν.
33	יָשֵׂ֣ם נְהָר֣וֹת לְמִדְבָּ֑ר וּמֹצָ֥אֵי מַ֝֗יִם לְצִמָּאֽוֹן׃	He turneth rivers into a wilderness, and the watersprings into dry ground;	ἔθετο ποταμοὺς εἰς ἔρημον καὶ διεξόδους ὑδάτων εἰς δίψαν,
34	אֶ֣רֶץ פְּ֭רִי לִמְלֵחָ֑ה מֵ֝רָעַ֗ת י֣וֹשְׁבֵי בָֽהּ׃	A fruitful land into barrenness, for the wickedness of them that dwell therein.	γῆν καρποφόρον εἰς ἅλμην ἀπὸ κακίας τῶν κατοικούντων ἐν αὐτῇ.
35	יָשֵׂ֣ם מִ֭דְבָּר לַאֲגַם־מַ֑יִם וְאֶ֥רֶץ צִ֝יָּ֗ה לְמֹצָ֥אֵי מָֽיִם׃	He turneth the wilderness into a standing water, and dry ground into watersprings.	ἔθετο ἔρημον εἰς λίμνας ὑδάτων καὶ γῆν ἄνυδρον εἰς διεξόδους ὑδάτων.
36	וַיּ֣וֹשֶׁב שָׁ֣ם רְעֵבִ֑ים וַ֝יְכוֹנְנ֗וּ עִ֣יר מוֹשָֽׁב׃	And there he maketh the hungry to dwell, that they may prepare a city for habitation;	καὶ κατῴκισεν ἐκεῖ πεινῶντας, καὶ συνεστήσαντο πόλεις κατοικεσίας
37	וַיִּזְרְע֣וּ שָׂ֭דוֹת וַיִּטְּע֣וּ כְרָמִ֑ים וַ֝יַּעֲשׂ֗וּ פְּרִ֣י תְבוּאָֽה׃	And sow the fields, and plant vineyards, which may yield fruits of increase.	καὶ ἔσπειραν ἀγροὺς καὶ ἐφύτευσαν ἀμπελῶνας καὶ ἐποίησαν καρπὸν γεννήματος,
38	וַיְבָרְכֵ֣ם וַיִּרְבּ֣וּ מְאֹ֑ד וּ֝בְהֶמְתָּ֗ם לֹ֣א יַמְעִֽיט׃	He blesseth them also, so that they are multiplied greatly; and suffereth not their cattle to decrease.	καὶ εὐλόγησεν αὐτούς, καὶ ἐπληθύνθησαν σφόδρα, καὶ τὰ κτήνη αὐτῶν οὐκ ἐσμίκρυνε.
39	וַיִּמְעֲט֥וּ וַיָּשֹׁ֑חוּ מֵעֹ֖צֶר רָעָ֣ה וְיָגֽוֹן׃	Again, they are minished and brought low through oppression, affliction, and sorrow.	καὶ ὠλιγώθησαν καὶ ἐκακώθησαν ἀπὸ θλίψεως κακῶν καὶ ὀδύνης.
40	׆ שֹׁפֵ֣ךְ בּ֭וּז עַל־נְדִיבִ֑ים וַ֝יַּתְעֵ֗ם בְּתֹ֣הוּ לֹא־דָֽרֶךְ׃	He poureth contempt upon princes, and causeth them to wander in the wilderness, where there is no way.	ἐξεχύθη ἐξουδένωσις ἐπ᾿ ἄρχοντας αὐτῶν, καὶ ἐπλάνησεν αὐτοὺς ἐν ἀβάτῳ καὶ οὐχ ὁδῷ.
41	וַיְשַׂגֵּ֣ב אֶבְי֣וֹן מֵע֑וֹנִי וַיָּ֥שֶׂם כַּ֝צֹּ֗אן מִשְׁפָּחֽוֹת׃	Yet setteth he the poor on high from affliction, and maketh him families like a flock.	καὶ ἐβοήθησε πένητι ἐκ πτωχείας καὶ ἔθετο ὡς πρόβατα πατριάς.
42	יִרְא֣וּ יְשָׁרִ֣ים וְיִשְׂמָ֑חוּ וְכׇל־עַ֝וְלָ֗ה קָ֣פְצָה פִּֽיהָ׃	The righteous shall see it, and rejoice: and all iniquity shall stop her mouth.	ὄψονται εὐθεῖς καὶ εὐφρανθήσονται, καὶ πᾶσα ἀνομία ἐμφράξει τὸ στόμα αὐτῆς.
43	מִי־חָכָ֥ם וְיִשְׁמׇר־אֵ֑לֶּה וְ֝יִתְבּוֹנְנ֗וּ חַֽסְדֵ֥י יְהֹוָֽה׃	Whoso is wise, and will observe these things, even they shall understand the lovingkindness of the LORD.	τίς σοφὸς καὶ φυλάξει ταῦτα καὶ συνήσει τὰ ἐλέη τοῦ Κυρίου;
