= Psalm 105 =

105th psalm of the Book of Psalms

- "O give thanks unto the LORD"
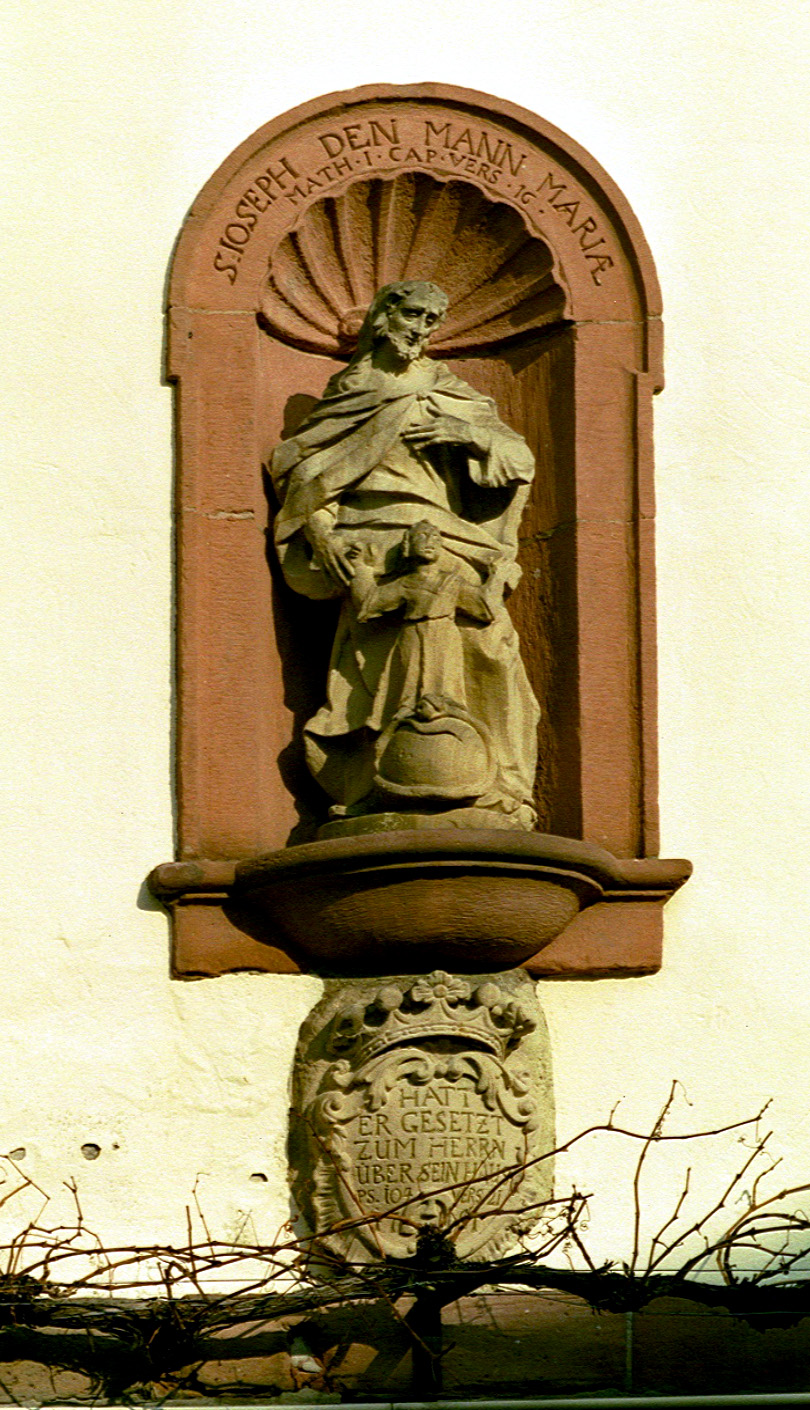
- Verse 3 quoted with a statue of Joseph in Diedesfeld
- Other name: Psalm 104; Confitemini Domino
- Language: Hebrew (original)

Psalm 105
- ← Psalm 104 Psalm 106 →
- Book: Book of Psalms
- Hebrew Bible part: Ketuvim
- Order in the Hebrew part: 1
- Category: Sifrei Emet
- Christian Bible part: Old Testament
- Order in the Christian part: 19

Psalm 105 is the 105th psalm of the Book of Psalms, beginning in English in the King James Version: "O give thanks unto the LORD". In the slightly different numbering system used in the Greek Septuagint and the Latin Vulgate version of the Bible, this psalm is Psalm 104. In Latin, it is known as "Confitemini Domino". Alexander Kirkpatrick observes that Psalms 105 and 106, the two historical psalms which end Book 4 of the Hebrew psalms, are closely related. Psalm 105 gives thanks for God's faithfulness to the covenant he made with Abraham; Psalm 106 is a psalm of penitence, reciting the history of Israel’s faithlessness and disobedience.

Psalm 105 is used as a regular part of Jewish, Eastern Orthodox, Catholic, Lutheran, Anglican and other Protestant liturgies. It has been set to music.

Psalm 105 and Psalm 106, both long historical Psalms, delineate contrasting narratives within the thematic spectrum of divine fidelity and human unfaithfulness. Psalm 105 serves as a chronicle of God's unwavering faithfulness, while Psalm 106, concluding Book 4 of Psalms, presents a historical account marked by the unfaithfulness of God's people. Noteworthy is O. Palmer Robertson's discernment that both Psalms draw inspiration from disparate sections of 1 Chronicles 16. A distinctive feature of Book 4 is a pronounced prevalence of references to Chronicles.

== Uses ==
=== New Testament ===
In the New Testament, verses 8–9 are quoted in the Song of Zechariah in Luke 1:72–73.

=== Judaism ===
- Recited on the first day of Passover.
- Verses 8–10 are part of the paragraph recited in the naming of a boy at a brit milah.
- Verses 8 and 42 are found separately in the repetition of the Amidah on Rosh Hashanah.

Psalm 105 is one of the ten Psalms of the Tikkun HaKlali of Rebbe Nachman of Breslov.

=== Eastern Orthodox Church ===
In the Eastern Orthodox Church, Psalm 104 (Psalm 105 in the Masoretic Text) is part of the fourteenth Kathisma division of the Psalter, read at Matins on Thursday mornings, as well as on Tuesdays and Fridays during Lent, at the Third Hour and Matins, respectively.

== Musical settings ==
Heinrich Schütz composed a four-part setting to a metric German text, "Danket dem Herren, lobt ihn frei", SVW 203, for the 1628 Becker Psalter.

American composer Kenneth Lampl composed the Psalm 105 meditation titled "Dirshu Adonai." The composition was featured by the American Choral Directors Association.

== Text ==
The following table shows the Hebrew text of the Psalm with vowels, alongside the Koine Greek text in the Septuagint and the English translation from the King James Version. Note that the meaning can slightly differ between these versions, as the Septuagint and the Masoretic Text come from different textual traditions. (Note: A 1917 translation directly from Hebrew to English by the Jewish Publication Society can be found here or here, and an 1844 translation directly from the Septuagint by L. C. L. Brenton can be found here. Both translations are in the public domain.) In the Septuagint, this psalm is numbered Psalm 104.

#	Hebrew	English	Greek
1	הוֹד֣וּ לַ֭יהֹוָה קִרְא֣וּ בִשְׁמ֑וֹ הוֹדִ֥יעוּ בָ֝עַמִּ֗ים עֲלִילוֹתָֽיו׃	O give thanks unto the LORD; call upon his name: make known his deeds among the people.	᾿Αλληλούϊα. - ΕΞΟΜΟΛΟΓΕΙΣΘΕ τῷ Κυρίῳ καὶ ἐπικαλεῖσθε τὸ ὄνομα αὐτοῦ, ἀπαγγείλατε ἐν τοῖς ἔθνεσι τὰ ἔργα αὐτοῦ·
2	שִֽׁירוּ־ל֭וֹ זַמְּרוּ־ל֑וֹ שִׂ֝֗יחוּ בְּכׇל־נִפְלְאוֹתָֽיו׃	Sing unto him, sing psalms unto him: talk ye of all his wondrous works.	ᾄσατε αὐτῷ καὶ ψάλατε αὐτῷ, διηγήσασθε πάντα τὰ θαυμάσια αὐτοῦ.
3	הִֽ֭תְהַלְלוּ בְּשֵׁ֣ם קׇדְשׁ֑וֹ יִ֝שְׂמַ֗ח לֵ֤ב ׀ מְבַקְשֵׁ֬י יְהֹוָֽה׃	Glory ye in his holy name: let the heart of them rejoice that seek the LORD.	ἐπαινεῖσθε ἐν τῷ ὀνόματι τῷ ἁγίῳ αὐτοῦ. εὐφρανθήτω καρδία ζητούντων τὸν Κύριον·
4	דִּרְשׁ֣וּ יְהֹוָ֣ה וְעֻזּ֑וֹ בַּקְּשׁ֖וּ פָנָ֣יו תָּמִֽיד׃	Seek the LORD, and his strength: seek his face evermore.	ζητήσατε τὸν Κύριον καὶ κραταιώθητε, ζητήσατε τὸ πρόσωπον αὐτοῦ διαπαντός.
5	זִכְר֗וּ נִפְלְאוֹתָ֥יו אֲשֶׁר־עָשָׂ֑ה מֹ֝פְתָ֗יו וּמִשְׁפְּטֵי־פִֽיו׃	Remember his marvellous works that he hath done; his wonders, and the judgments of his mouth;	μνήσθητε τῶν θαυμασίων αὐτοῦ, ὧν ἐποίησε, τὰ τέρατα αὐτοῦ καὶ τὰ κρίματα τοῦ στόματος αὐτοῦ,
6	זֶ֭רַע אַבְרָהָ֣ם עַבְדּ֑וֹ בְּנֵ֖י יַעֲקֹ֣ב בְּחִירָֽיו׃	O ye seed of Abraham his servant, ye children of Jacob his chosen.	σπέρμα ῾Αβραὰμ δοῦλοι αὐτοῦ, υἱοὶ ᾿Ιακὼβ ἐκλεκτοὶ αὐτοῦ.
7	ה֭וּא יְהֹוָ֣ה אֱלֹהֵ֑ינוּ בְּכׇל־הָ֝אָ֗רֶץ מִשְׁפָּטָֽיו׃	He is the LORD our God: his judgments are in all the earth.	αὐτὸς Κύριος ὁ Θεὸς ἡμῶν, ἐν πάσῃ τῇ γῇ τὰ κρίματα αὐτοῦ.
8	זָכַ֣ר לְעוֹלָ֣ם בְּרִית֑וֹ דָּבָ֥ר צִ֝וָּ֗ה לְאֶ֣לֶף דּֽוֹר׃	He hath remembered his covenant for ever, the word which he commanded to a thousand generations.	ἐμνήσθη εἰς τὸν αἰῶνα διαθήκης αὐτοῦ, λόγου, οὗ ἐνετείλατο εἰς χιλίας γενεάς,
9	אֲשֶׁ֣ר כָּ֭רַת אֶת־אַבְרָהָ֑ם וּשְׁב֖וּעָת֣וֹ לְיִשְׂחָֽק׃	Which covenant he made with Abraham, and his oath unto Isaac;	ὃν διέθετο τῷ ῾Αβραάμ, καὶ τοῦ ὅρκου αὐτοῦ τῷ ᾿Ισαὰκ
10	וַיַּעֲמִידֶ֣הָ לְיַעֲקֹ֣ב לְחֹ֑ק לְ֝יִשְׂרָאֵ֗ל בְּרִ֣ית עוֹלָֽם׃	And confirmed the same unto Jacob for a law, and to Israel for an everlasting covenant:	καὶ ἔστησεν αὐτὸν τῷ ᾿Ιακὼβ εἰς πρόσταγμα καὶ τῷ ᾿Ισραὴλ εἰς διαθήκην αἰώνιον
11	לֵאמֹ֗ר לְךָ֗ אֶתֵּ֥ן אֶת־אֶֽרֶץ־כְּנָ֑עַן חֶ֝֗בֶל נַחֲלַתְכֶֽם׃	Saying, Unto thee will I give the land of Canaan, the lot of your inheritance:	λέγων· σοὶ δώσω τὴν γῆν Χαναὰν σχοίνισμα κληρονομίας ὑμῶν.
12	בִּֽ֭הְיוֹתָם מְתֵ֣י מִסְפָּ֑ר כִּ֝מְעַ֗ט וְגָרִ֥ים בָּֽהּ׃	When they were but a few men in number; yea, very few, and strangers in it.	ἐν τῷ εἶναι αὐτοὺς ἀριθμῷ βραχεῖς, ὀλιγοστοὺς καὶ παροίκους ἐν αὐτῇ
13	וַ֭יִּֽתְהַלְּכוּ מִגּ֣וֹי אֶל־גּ֑וֹי מִ֝מַּמְלָכָ֗ה אֶל־עַ֥ם אַחֵֽר׃	When they went from one nation to another, from one kingdom to another people;	καὶ διῆλθον ἐξ ἔθνους εἰς ἔθνος, καὶ ἐκ βασιλείας εἰς λαὸν ἕτερον.
14	לֹא־הִנִּ֣יחַ אָדָ֣ם לְעׇשְׁקָ֑ם וַיּ֖וֹכַח עֲלֵיהֶ֣ם מְלָכִֽים׃	He suffered no man to do them wrong: yea, he reproved kings for their sakes;	οὐκ ἀφῆκεν ἄνθρωπον ἀδικῆσαι αὐτοὺς καὶ ἤλεγξεν ὑπὲρ αὐτῶν βασιλεῖς·
15	אַֽל־תִּגְּע֥וּ בִמְשִׁיחָ֑י וְ֝לִנְבִיאַ֗י אַל־תָּרֵֽעוּ׃	Saying, Touch not mine anointed, and do my prophets no harm.	μὴ ἅπτεσθε τῶν χριστῶν μου καὶ ἐν τοῖς προφήταις μου μὴ πονηρεύεσθε.
16	וַיִּקְרָ֣א רָ֭עָב עַל־הָאָ֑רֶץ כׇּֽל־מַטֵּה־לֶ֥חֶם שָׁבָֽר׃	Moreover he called for a famine upon the land: he brake the whole staff of bread.	καὶ ἐκάλεσε λιμὸν ἐπὶ τὴν γῆν, πᾶν στήριγμα ἄρτου συνέτριψεν·
17	שָׁלַ֣ח לִפְנֵיהֶ֣ם אִ֑ישׁ לְ֝עֶ֗בֶד נִמְכַּ֥ר יוֹסֵֽף׃	He sent a man before them, even Joseph, who was sold for a servant:	ἀπέστειλεν ἔμπροσθεν αὐτῶν ἄνθρωπον, εἰς δοῦλον ἐπράθη ᾿Ιωσήφ.
18	עִנּ֣וּ בַכֶּ֣בֶל (רגליו) [רַגְל֑וֹ] בַּ֝רְזֶ֗ל בָּ֣אָה נַפְשֽׁוֹ׃	Whose feet they hurt with fetters: he was laid in iron:	ἐταπείνωσαν ἐν πέδαις τοὺς πόδας αὐτοῦ, σίδηρον διῆλθεν ἡ ψυχὴ αὐτοῦ
19	עַד־עֵ֥ת בֹּא־דְבָר֑וֹ אִמְרַ֖ת יְהֹוָ֣ה צְרָפָֽתְהוּ׃	Until the time that his word came: the word of the LORD tried him.	μέχρι τοῦ ἐλθεῖν τὸν λόγον αὐτοῦ, τὸ λόγιον τοῦ Κυρίου ἐπύρωσεν αὐτόν.
20	שָׁ֣לַח מֶ֭לֶךְ וַיַּתִּירֵ֑הוּ מֹשֵׁ֥ל עַ֝מִּ֗ים וַֽיְפַתְּחֵֽהוּ׃	The king sent and loosed him; even the ruler of the people, and let him go free.	ἀπέστειλε βασιλεὺς καὶ ἔλυσεν αὐτόν, ἄρχων λαοῦ, καὶ ἀφῆκεν αὐτόν.
21	שָׂמ֣וֹ אָד֣וֹן לְבֵית֑וֹ וּ֝מֹשֵׁ֗ל בְּכׇל־קִנְיָנֽוֹ׃	He made him lord of his house, and ruler of all his substance:	κατέστησεν αὐτὸν κύριον τοῦ οἴκου αὐτοῦ καὶ ἄρχοντα πάσης τῆς κτήσεως αὐτοῦ
22	לֶאְסֹ֣ר שָׂרָ֣יו בְּנַפְשׁ֑וֹ וּזְקֵנָ֥יו יְחַכֵּֽם׃	To bind his princes at his pleasure; and teach his senators wisdom.	τοῦ παιδεῦσαι τοὺς ἄρχοντας αὐτοῦ ὡς ἑαυτὸν καὶ τοὺς πρεσβυτέρους αὐτοῦ σοφίσαι.
23	וַיָּבֹ֣א יִשְׂרָאֵ֣ל מִצְרָ֑יִם וְ֝יַעֲקֹ֗ב גָּ֣ר בְּאֶֽרֶץ־חָֽם׃	Israel also came into Egypt; and Jacob sojourned in the land of Ham.	καὶ εἰσῆλθεν ᾿Ισραὴλ εἰς Αἴγυπτον, καὶ ᾿Ιακὼβ παρῴκησεν ἐν γῇ Χάμ.
24	וַיֶּ֣פֶר אֶת־עַמּ֣וֹ מְאֹ֑ד וַ֝יַּעֲצִמֵ֗הוּ מִצָּרָֽיו׃	And he increased his people greatly; and made them stronger than their enemies.	καὶ ηὔξησε τὸν λαὸν αὐτοῦ σφόδρα καὶ ἐκραταίωσεν αὐτὸν ὑπὲρ τοὺς ἐχθροὺς αὐτοῦ.
25	הָפַ֣ךְ לִ֭בָּם לִשְׂנֹ֣א עַמּ֑וֹ לְ֝הִתְנַכֵּ֗ל בַּעֲבָדָֽיו׃	He turned their heart to hate his people, to deal subtilly with his servants.	μετέστρεψε τὴν καρδίαν αὐτοῦ τοῦ μισῆσαι τὸν λαὸν αὐτοῦ, τοῦ δολιοῦσθαι ἐν τοῖς δούλοις αὐτοῦ.
26	שָׁ֭לַח מֹשֶׁ֣ה עַבְדּ֑וֹ אַ֝הֲרֹ֗ן אֲשֶׁ֣ר בָּחַר־בּֽוֹ׃	He sent Moses his servant; and Aaron whom he had chosen.	ἐξαπέστειλε Μωϋσῆν τὸν δοῦλον αὐτοῦ, ᾿Ααρών, ὃν ἐξελέξατο ἑαυτῷ.
27	שָֽׂמוּ־בָ֭ם דִּבְרֵ֣י אֹתוֹתָ֑יו וּ֝מֹפְתִ֗ים בְּאֶ֣רֶץ חָֽם׃	They shewed his signs among them, and wonders in the land of Ham.	ἔθετο ἐν αὐτοῖς τοὺς λόγους τῶν σημείων αὐτοῦ καὶ τῶν τεράτων αὐτοῦ ἐν γῇ Χάμ.
28	שָׁ֣לַֽח חֹ֭שֶׁךְ וַיַּחְשִׁ֑ךְ וְלֹֽא־מָ֝ר֗וּ אֶת־[דְּבָרֽוֹ] (דבריו)׃	He sent darkness, and made it dark; and they rebelled not against his word.	ἐξαπέστειλε σκότος καὶ ἐσκότασεν, ὅτι παρεπίκραναν τοὺς λόγους αὐτοῦ·
29	הָפַ֣ךְ אֶת־מֵימֵיהֶ֣ם לְדָ֑ם וַ֝יָּ֗מֶת אֶת־דְּגָתָֽם׃	He turned their waters into blood, and slew their fish.	μετέστρεψε τὰ ὕδατα αὐτῶν εἰς αἷμα, καὶ ἀπέκτεινε τοὺς ἰχθύας αὐτῶν.
30	שָׁרַ֣ץ אַרְצָ֣ם צְפַרְדְּעִ֑ים בְּ֝חַדְרֵ֗י מַלְכֵיהֶֽם׃	Their land brought forth frogs in abundance, in the chambers of their kings.	ἐξῆρψεν ἡ γῆ αὐτῶν βατράχους ἐν τοῖς ταμιείοις τῶν βασιλέων αὐτῶν.
31	אָ֭מַר וַיָּבֹ֣א עָרֹ֑ב כִּ֝נִּ֗ים בְּכׇל־גְּבוּלָֽם׃	He spake, and there came divers sorts of flies, and lice in all their coasts.	εἶπε, καὶ ἦλθε κυνόμυια καὶ σκνῖπες ἐν πᾶσι τοῖς ὁρίοις αὐτῶν.
32	נָתַ֣ן גִּשְׁמֵיהֶ֣ם בָּרָ֑ד אֵ֖שׁ לֶהָב֣וֹת בְּאַרְצָֽם׃	He gave them hail for rain, and flaming fire in their land.	ἔθετο τὰς βροχὰς αὐτῶν χάλαζαν, πῦρ καταφλέγον ἐν τῇ γῇ αὐτῶν,
33	וַיַּ֣ךְ גַּ֭פְנָם וּתְאֵנָתָ֑ם וַ֝יְשַׁבֵּ֗ר עֵ֣ץ גְּבוּלָֽם׃	He smote their vines also and their fig trees; and brake the trees of their coasts.	καὶ ἐπάταξε τὰς ἀμπέλους αὐτῶν καὶ τὰς συκᾶς αὐτῶν καὶ συνέτριψε πᾶν ξύλον ὁρίου αὐτῶν.
34	אָ֭מַר וַיָּבֹ֣א אַרְבֶּ֑ה וְ֝יֶ֗לֶק וְאֵ֣ין מִסְפָּֽר׃	He spake, and the locusts came, and caterpillars, and that without number,	εἶπε καὶ ἦλθεν ἀκρίς, καὶ βροῦχος, οὗ οὐκ ἦν ἀριθμός,
35	וַיֹּ֣אכַל כׇּל־עֵ֣שֶׂב בְּאַרְצָ֑ם וַ֝יֹּ֗אכַל פְּרִ֣י אַדְמָתָֽם׃	And did eat up all the herbs in their land, and devoured the fruit of their ground.	καὶ κατέφαγε πάντα τὸν χόρτον ἐν τῇ γῇ αὐτῶν, καὶ κατέφαγε τὸν καρπὸν τῆς γῆς αὐτῶν.
36	וַיַּ֣ךְ כׇּל־בְּכ֣וֹר בְּאַרְצָ֑ם רֵ֝אשִׁ֗ית לְכׇל־אוֹנָֽם׃	He smote also all the firstborn in their land, the chief of all their strength.	καὶ ἐπάταξε πᾶν πρωτότοκον ἐν τῇ γῇ αὐτῶν, ἀπαρχὴν παντὸς πόνου αὐτῶν.
37	וַֽ֭יּוֹצִיאֵם בְּכֶ֣סֶף וְזָהָ֑ב וְאֵ֖ין בִּשְׁבָטָ֣יו כּוֹשֵֽׁל׃	He brought them forth also with silver and gold: and there was not one feeble person among their tribes.	καὶ ἐξήγαγεν αὐτοὺς ἐν ἀργυρίῳ καὶ χρυσίῳ, καὶ οὐκ ἦν ἐν ταῖς φυλαῖς αὐτῶν ὁ ἀσθενῶν.
38	שָׂמַ֣ח מִצְרַ֣יִם בְּצֵאתָ֑ם כִּֽי־נָפַ֖ל פַּחְדָּ֣ם עֲלֵיהֶֽם׃	Egypt was glad when they departed: for the fear of them fell upon them.	εὐφράνθη Αἴγυπτος ἐν τῇ ἐξόδῳ αὐτῶν, ὅτι ἐπέπεσεν ὁ φόβος αὐτῶν ἐπ᾿ αὐτούς.
39	פָּרַ֣שׂ עָנָ֣ן לְמָסָ֑ךְ וְ֝אֵ֗שׁ לְהָאִ֥יר לָֽיְלָה׃	He spread a cloud for a covering; and fire to give light in the night.	διεπέτασε νεφέλην εἰς σκέπην αὐτοῖς καὶ πῦρ τοῦ φωτίσαι αὐτοῖς τὴν νύκτα.
40	שָׁ֭אַל וַיָּבֵ֣א שְׂלָ֑ו וְלֶ֥חֶם שָׁ֝מַ֗יִם יַשְׂבִּיעֵֽם׃	The people asked, and he brought quails, and satisfied them with the bread of heaven.	ᾔτησαν, καὶ ἦλθεν ὀρτυγομήτρα, καὶ ἄρτον οὐρανοῦ ἐνέπλησεν αὐτούς·
41	פָּ֣תַח צ֭וּר וַיָּז֣וּבוּ מָ֑יִם הָ֝לְכ֗וּ בַּצִּיּ֥וֹת נָהָֽר׃	He opened the rock, and the waters gushed out; they ran in the dry places like a river.	διέρρηξε πέτραν, καὶ ἐρρύησαν ὕδατα, ἐπορεύθησαν ἐν ἀνύδροις ποταμοί.
42	כִּֽי־זָ֭כַר אֶת־דְּבַ֣ר קׇדְשׁ֑וֹ אֶֽת־אַבְרָהָ֥ם עַבְדּֽוֹ׃	For he remembered his holy promise, and Abraham his servant.	ὅτι ἐμνήσθη τοῦ λόγου τοῦ ἁγίου αὐτοῦ τοῦ πρὸς ῾Αβραὰμ τὸν δοῦλον αὐτοῦ
43	וַיּוֹצִ֣א עַמּ֣וֹ בְשָׂשׂ֑וֹן בְּ֝רִנָּ֗ה אֶת־בְּחִירָֽיו׃	And he brought forth his people with joy, and his chosen with gladness:	καὶ ἐξήγαγε τὸν λαὸν αὐτοῦ ἐν ἀγαλλιάσει καὶ τοὺς ἐκλεκτοὺς αὐτοῦ ἐν εὐφροσύνῃ.
44	וַיִּתֵּ֣ן לָ֭הֶם אַרְצ֣וֹת גּוֹיִ֑ם וַעֲמַ֖ל לְאֻמִּ֣ים יִירָֽשׁוּ׃	And gave them the lands of the heathen: and they inherited the labour of the people;	καὶ ἔδωκεν αὐτοῖς χώρας ἐθνῶν, καὶ πόνους λαῶν κατεκληρονόμησαν,
45	בַּעֲב֤וּר ׀ יִשְׁמְר֣וּ חֻ֭קָּיו וְתוֹרֹתָ֥יו יִנְצֹ֗רוּ הַֽלְלוּ־יָֽהּ׃	That they might observe his statutes, and keep his laws. Praise ye the LORD.	ὅπως ἂν φυλάξωσι τὰ δικαιώματα αὐτοῦ, καὶ τὸν νόμον αὐτοῦ ἐκζητήσωσιν.

=== Related Bible passages ===
Related Bible passages include: Va'eira, Bo (parsha), and Beshalach: Torah portions (parashot) telling the Exodus story; Psalm 78.

There are two slight differences between the wording of verses 1–15 and the parallel passage in 1 Chronicles 16:

- Verse 6: O offspring of his servant Abraham, reads O offspring of his servant Israel in 1 Chronicles 16:13
- Verse 8: He is mindful of his covenant for ever reads Remember his covenant for ever in 1 Chronicles 16:15.

=== Verse 1 ===
Oh, give thanks to the Lord!
Call upon His name;
Make known His deeds among the peoples!

The word "Ἁλληλουιά", "alleluia", precedes this verse in the Septuagint, where it has been transposed from verse 35 of the previous psalm.

== See also ==
- Ipuwer Papyrus
