= Danket, danket dem Herrn =

Christian hymn

- Christian hymn
- English: Thank the Lord
- Text: Psalm 106:1
- Language: German
- Composed: 18th century

"Danket, danket dem Herrn" (Thank the Lord) is a Christian hymn in German. The short text is taken from psalms. The music is traditional, from the 18th century. It is a round, often used for grace after meals, but also used for other occasions of thanksgiving. The song is included in German Protestant and Catholic hymnals and many songbooks, and is considered to be among the most widespread rounds in German.

== History ==
The hymn "Danket, danket dem Herrn" has a short text that begins like various psalms such as Psalm 106:1, Psalm 107:1 and Psalm 136:1. In the King James Version, it reads: "O give thanks unto the LORD, for he is good: for his mercy endureth for ever". A hymn with these words was published by Gottfried Vopelius in his Neu Leipziger Gesangbuch (1682), and that hymn was harmonized by J. S. Bach as BWV 286.

The traditional music was written in the 18th century, as a round in four parts. It is used as grace for meals, and for other occasions to give thanks, such as baptism, confirmation, and Erntedank. With its short text, it can be sung by small children before they can read.

The song appears in the German Protestant hymnal of 1995 as EG 336. In the German Catholic hymnal Gotteslob, it was included in the first 1975 edition as GL 283, and in the second 2013 edition as 406 in the section Leben in Gott – Lob, Dank und Anbetung (Life in God – Praise, thanks and adoration). It is printed in other songbooks, such as the Die Mundorgel. It is also sung in French as Rendons grâce au Seigneur. Il est charitable, sa bonté, sa vérité durent pour l'éternité.

The round was included in the collection Himmelgrün for the Landesgartenschau state garden show of Rhineland-Palatinate in Landau in 2015. It has been described as one of the most widespread rounds in German.

== Music and theme ==
The text is split into four sections:

The music is typically notated in F major. The melody has a rather wide range, rising in the second section, and low in the last section. It calls for careful choice of the starting-note.
