= Traditional Jewish chronology =

Jewish chronology

Jewish tradition has long preserved a record of dates and time sequences of important historical events related to the Jewish nation including, but not limited to, the dates fixed for the building and destruction of the Second Temple. The same fixed points in time (henceforth: chronological dates) are well-documented and supported by ancient works, although when compared to the synchronistic chronological tables of modern-day chroniclers and western scholars of history, they are often at variance with their modern dating system. Discrepancies between the two systems may be as much as 2 years, or well-over 100 years, depending on the event. Prior to the adoption of the BC / AD era of computation and its synchronization with the regnal years of kings and Caesars recorded in historical records, Jews made use of the earlier Seleucid era counting (also known as the Year of Alexander), or, in Hebrew, minyan li-šṭarōth ("era of contracts"), by which historical dates were marked from the time of Alexander the Great.

In ordinary time-keeping, a single major event was often used as a datum point for reckoning time. Historians would note how much time had passed since one important event in relation to some later event, as is the case in Jewish chronology.

== Brief history of chronology ==
The Greek historian Timaeus of Tauromenium (c. 365 BCE–260 BCE) introduced the system of reckoning by Olympiads. Nepos is generally acclaimed to have been the first Roman writer of chronography. He marks the birth of Alexander the Great in the 385th year after the foundation of Rome, giving also the names of the consuls for that year. Rome's founding, or what is known as "A.U.C.," ab urbe condita, "from the foundation of the city [of Rome]," is fixed by Nepos, as also by Polybius, as falling in "the second year of the seventh Olympiad," a year corresponding roughly with 751/0 BCE. Like ancient Hebrew writers of history, their delineations of imperial chronology were centered mostly around provincial, or local, history.

Josephus, when bringing down the regnal years of the Babylonian kings who feature highly in Israel's history, cites the third book of Berossus.

Manetho, who was a high priest and scribe of Egypt, copied down from the ancient Egyptian inscriptions a chronological list of eight early Persian kings for Ptolemy Philadelphus (266–228 BCE), beginning with Cambyses, the son of Cyrus the Great, and omitting only the magi's interim rule.

Suetonius's De vita Caesarum (Lives of the Caesars), Josephus's The Jewish War, and Epiphanius's On Weights and Measures (Syriac version), all have attempted to accurately portray the regnal years of the Roman emperors, and, despite their good efforts, there are still discrepancies between them. These variants will invariably lead to discrepancies in the accepted chronologies. In Jerome's Chronici Canones (Chronicle) which he completed in 381 CE, the first regnal year of Julius Caesar, the first Roman emperor: Romanorum primus Caius Iulius Caesar, is marked as 48 BCE, but which Jerome in his original document had written in Roman numerals and given only the number of the Olympiad for events, and no more. Indeed, the corresponding BCE dates which are now present in this work are only the additions of the modern editor, Rudolf Helm.

"For modern scholarship the problem," in E. J. Bickerman's words, "is 'how we know Caesar was assassinated on March 15, 44 BC[E].' Before 480 BC[E], no date can be precise in terms of the Julian calendar unless confirmed by astronomical phenomena." There is also considerable disagreement among scholarship as to when to reckon the beginning of Augustus Caesar's imperium.

Echoing these great difficulties in chronological notations, D. MacNaughton wrote: "Systems of ancient chronology, propounded even since the days of George Smith, have been many and various, and while in one year one date is assigned with an air of finality to a certain king, a few years later the date is abandoned as erroneous. These changes are natural." In fact, it has taken many hundreds of years for scholars to arrive at the dates that are now assumed to be accurate, as purported by Grafton in his book on "Joseph Scaliger," and where he shows how long it took for Roman consular dates (and archon dates, etc.) to be converted into BC/AD. All the ancient dating systems had to be aligned and converted into the modern system, and cross-referenced, and where others were not easily translatable.

For the chronologies of Babylonian kings up to the fall of Babylon, as well as the chronologies of Persian kings, beginning with Cyrus the Great, modern-day historians rely principally upon the work Ptolemy's canon.

== Cornerstones in Jewish tradition ==
Amongst Jews, the era known as the Seleucid era has been used in antiquity to mark chronological events. It was used extensively by Sherira Gaon in the writing of his Iggeret. The practice of reckoning years by this system is mentioned in the Babylonian Talmud (Avodah Zarah 10a): "Said Rav Nahman: In the Diaspora, it is not permissible to count [the date in years] except only by the kings of the Grecians." Its usage was common throughout the Jewish world until the sixteenth century, and has been used by Yemenite Diaspora Jews as late as the 1940s, until their immigration to the Land of Israel. By their recollection of the current calendar year, it is shown to have started in the Fall (Tishri) of 312 BCE, which agrees with modern scholarship (312/311).

It is disputed, however, how Alexander the Great fits-in with this Hellenistic dating era. Talmudic exegete, Rabbeinu Chananel, following Seder Olam, alleged that the Seleucid era commenced in the 6th-year of the reign of Alexander the Great, and that there were 40 years from the building of the Second Temple (during the reign of the Persian king Darius the Great) until the 6th year of the reign of Alexander the Great, namely, in 312 BCE. According to Rabbeinu Chananel, this 40-year period marked the building of the Second Temple under Darius the Great in 352 BCE and the beginning of Grecian hegemony over Israel in 312 BCE. Modern-day chroniclers assign different dates for Alexander's reign. Modern-day chroniclers also contend that from Darius the Great who laid the foundation of the Second Temple to Alexander the Great there was a span of 190 years, rather than a mere 40 years.

According to Josephus, Alexander the Great died in the 114th Olympiad, after reigning 12 years. If so, the 114th Olympiad would have corresponded with about 326 BCE, or what was then 15 years before they began to make use of the Seleucid era counting. Others put his death in 323 BCE, 12 years before the start of the Seleucid era. It is said that the Jews started this system of reckoning the years, in recognition of Alexander the Great who passed through their country and who received warmly the Jewish High Priest who came out to greet him. Others say that the introduction of this new era was in commemoration of the year in which Seleucus I reconquered Babylon and got the dominion over Syria, which last opinion seems to be that of Josephus as well (cf. Antiquities 13.6.7.).

The advantage of the Seleucid era counting system is that historical dates marked in this era do not require later synchronization with the BC / AD era configurations based on kings' reigns, configurations added later by modern chroniclers when trying to fixate the regnal years of various kings. Rather, all that was required of the Seleucid era counting was to simply convert it into the date used in the Common Era, without consideration for the rest. While the Seleucid Era counting has been abandoned in the writing of legal deeds, promissory notes, court attestations, etc., it is still relied upon by all observant Jews when determining the 2nd Temple's destruction. It is also considered very reliable when seeking to determine dates of events in relation to the Common Era, making for a more precise fixation of an event.

Another reason for the popularity of the Seleucid era counting amongst Jews is that the commencement of the Seleucid era was seen as a key fixed point of reference, being, according to Seder Olam, 1,000 years after the giving of the law at Sinai, or, precisely one-thousand years after Israel's departure out of Egypt.

Typically, a Jewish date is only informative if it can be identified in relation to some other point of reference, in this case, usually another calendar. Today, however, Jews make use of the era known as Anno Mundi, the "era of creation," in their transaction of dates.

=== Second Temple: Its years of duration and year of destruction ===
Jewish tradition holds that the Second Temple stood for 420 years. The same Jewish tradition holds that the Second Temple was destroyed in the lunar month Av (August), in the year 68 of the Common Era (rather than in year 70), naturally implying that the Second Temple was built in the year 352 BCE. Since it was during the reign of the Persian king, Darius the Great (Darius b. Hystaspes), that the Second Temple was constructed (Ezra 6:15), in the sixth-year of his reign, the timeframe given for this Persian king in Jewish chronology (whose reign, accordingly, began in 358 BCE) stands at variance with the time-frame given for the same king in conventional chronology (who is said to have reigned between 521 BCE–486 BCE), a 163-year disparity.

Jews have traditionally held the view that the date in which they are to reckon the 2nd Temple's destruction is the year which preceded the 380th year of the Seleucid era, also known as the Year of Alexander (a date which corresponds to anno 69 CE). This means the destruction of the 2nd Temple fell out in the lunar month of Av in the 379th year of the Seleucid era counting (Year of Alexander), or what corresponds to anno 68 CE.

The two most ancient historical sources used to support this tradition are the Jewish historian Josephus, citing the Book of Maccabees, and the Aramaic Scroll of Antiochus (compiled, according to Saadia Gaon, by the elders of the Schools of Hillel and Shammai). The Scroll of Antiochus would have been written in the early first century CE, before Suetonius wrote his Lives of the Caesars. However, there is a proclivity among modern-day chroniclers to bypass these Jewish sources, in favor of others.

According to the Aramaic Scroll of Antiochus, from the Second Temple's rebuilding till the 23rd year of the reign of Antiochus Eupator, son of Antiochus Epiphanes who invaded Judea, there had transpired 213 years in total (i.e. since the Second Temple's construction under Darius). Quoting verbatim from that ancient Aramaic record:

בִּשׁנַת עַסרִין וּתלָת שְׁנִין לְמִמלְכֵיהּ, בִּשׁנַת מָאתַן וּתלָת עֲסַר שְׁנִין לְבִניַין בֵּית אֱלָהָא דֵין, שַׁוִּי אַנפּוֹהִי לְמִיסַּק לִירוּשְׁלֵם
(Literal translation: In the twenty third year of his kingdom, in the two-hundred and thirteenth year of the rebuilding of this, God's house, he (Antiochus Eupator) put his face to go up to Jerusalem.)

This time period given for Antiochus Eupator's reign is taken in conjunction with another record mentioned by Josephus, in his Antiquities of the Jews (12.9.2.). Based on Josephus's record, who cites from the First Book of Maccabees (6:16), Antiochus Eupator began his reign after his father's death (Antiochus Epiphanes) in anno 149 of the Seleucid era (= 162 BCE). Twenty-three years into Antiochus Eupator's reign would have then been anno 172 of the Seleucid Era, or what was then 139 BCE. Since, according to the Scroll of Antiochus, the Second Temple had already been standing 213 years, this means that the Second Temple was completed in anno 352 BCE, being what was then the 6th year of the reign of Darius the king (i.e. Darius, the son of Hystaspes), the year in which the king finished its building according to Ezra 6:15. Jewish tradition, which assigns 420 years to its duration, means that its destruction occurred in 68 CE.

Although this date of the Temple's rebuilding largely disagrees with modern scholarship who base their chronologies upon the Babylonian Chronicles and its rebuilding in 516 BCE when Darius I was thought to have reigned, it has, nonetheless, long been held by religious Jewish circles as being accurate and reliable, since it is founded upon a tradition passed down generation after generation. Modern scholars seek to rectify this apparent disparity in time by saying that "the Darius in whose reign the Second Temple was built, was not Darius I, as is commonly supposed, but Darius II." In this case, the chronology thus established is in striking agreement with certain chronological data or implications in Josephus and rabbinic literature as well as the writing of a letter to Artaxerxes Ezra 4:7 before Darius II's decree to rebuild (Ezra 6:12) – Artaxerxes I ruled between Darius I and II. On the other hand, the first decree to rebuild occurred before Darius I, by Cyrus Ezra 1:2, and during Artaxerxes I's reign work was begun on rebuilding the city of Jerusalem during which a chamber of the temple is in use Nehemiah 13:6–7. If the Darius in whose reign the Second Temple was built was Darius I, the date of its construction must, of necessity, be pulled back earlier to 516 BCE.

=== Counter-arguments against Seder Olam ===
The Greek historian Herodotus lived from circa 484 BCE to 425 BCE, and wrote about the dynastic history of four Persian kings in nine books: Cyrus (557–530 BCE, Book 1); Cambyses (530–522 BCE, Book 2 and part of Book 3); Darius (521–486 BCE, the rest of Book 3 and Books 4,5,6); and Xerxes (486–479 BCE, Books 7, 8, 9).

One of the strongest counter-arguments that can be made against Seder Olam and its demarcations in time is that, if the Second Temple was completed in the 6th year of the reign of Darius the Great, as noted by the Hebrew scriptures (Ezra 6:15), and which Temple, according to Seder Olam, stood 420 years and was built in 352 BCE, this would put the Greek historian Herodotus as having written his Histories (compiled c. 430 BCE) long before the event detailing Darius's actions ever having taken place, or some 72 years before Darius the Great ever came to power. Based on the year in which Herodotus completed his Histories, and where he mentions Cyrus the Great as reigning 29 years, and his son Cambyses reigning 5 years, and Darius the Great reigning 36 years, this would point to a time much earlier than that presumed to have happened for these same events based on Seder Olam. These four kings were all before Herodotus died, as Herodotus could not possibly have written about kings that, according to the Seder Olam, supposedly lived after his time.

In conclusion, the terminus post quem for the Second Temple's construction would have been before Herodotus wrote his Histories. These arguments point to the primacy of Josephus' chronological timetable over those written in Seder Olam.

According to the Chronicle of Jerome, Herodotus became well-known in the 78th Olympiad, meaning, between 378 BCE–375 BCE, about 52–55 years after compiling his Histories.

Another difficulty with Seder Olam is in its chronological list of successive Babylonian and Persian kings (chapters 28–29), during the one-hundred years prior to the building of the Second Temple, and which stands in stark contrast to the earlier historical records for the same kings, as penned by Josephus who cites Berossus, as well as by Manetho and by Ptolemy of Alexandria in his Canon.

Seder Olam has contracted the Persian period into 34 years, explained by Rashi to mean the time span between the building of the Second Temple under Darius in 352 BC (according to Jewish calculations) and Alexander the Great's rise to power in 318 BCE. This time-frame, therefore, does not signify the end of the dynasties in Persia, but rather of their rule and hegemony over Israel before Alexander the Great rose to power. The difficulty besetting this explanation, however, lies in the fact that from Darius I who laid the foundation of the Second Temple to Alexander the Great, who brought an end to Persian hegemony over Israel, there are collected no less than 190 years. This would suggest that the author of Seder Olam confounded Darius I with Darius III Codomannus, the latter Darius being a contemporary with Alexander the Great.

Another variant argument against the priority of Seder Olam is that if there were only 34 years from Darius I to Alexander the Great, Haggai 1:1 informs its reader that the first high priest to officiate in the Second Temple was Jeshua b. Josadek, and that this high priest was contemporary with Darius I. Josephus informs his readers that there was a succession of eight high priests from Jeshua b. Josadek to Simon the Just (see infra), which last high priest, according to the Talmud (Yoma 69a), was contemporary with Alexander the Great. Since the high-priesthood is passed down from father to son after the father's death, it strains credulity to think that, in only a short 34-year period, eight high priests served in that Temple. Even if one were to extrapolate from Josephus's words (Antiquities 11.8.4–5.) that Alexander the Great had actually met-up with the sixth line of high priests, namely, with Jaddua b. Jonathan, this would imply that each high priest served, on average, no longer than a little over 5.5 years. Contemporary chronology puts this same period at approximately 190 years, which, on average, makes each of the eight high priests serving for a period of about 24 years.

Seder Olam versus Conventional chronology (click to open)
Successive Chaldean rulers	Conventional chronology	Seder Olam's chronology
Nebuchadnezzar	43 years	45 years (Note: According to one Jewish tradition, the seventy-year period of exile commences with the beginning of Nebuchadnezzar's reign, and concludes with the rise of Cyrus the Great who ordered the rebuilding of Jerusalem.)
Amel-Marduk	2 years	23 years
It is to be noted here that where conventional chronology goes on to cite another 3 successive Chaldean kings (spanning a period of nearly 22 years), Talmudic chronology cites only one Chaldean king that reigned after Amel-Marduk, namely, Baltasar (co-regent with Nabonidus), and who is said by the Talmudic record to have reigned a mere 3 years.		
Neriglissar	4 years	---
Labosordacus	9 months	---
Nabonidus (Baltasar) (Note: Others see Baltasar as Nabonidus' son and co-regent)	[Nabonidus] 17 years (Note: The scholars who deciphered The Babylonian Chronicles (inscribed on tablets) and who analyzed the delineation of years inscribed therein have put the fall of Babylon, in the 17th-year of Nabonidus, in 539 BCE.)	[Baltasar] 3 years (Note: In the Talmud, the name Nabonidus is not mentioned, whereas the presumed succession went from Nebuchadnezzar to his son Amel-Marduk, and from Amel-Marduk to his son Baltasar. Although the full regnal years of the man are not mentioned in the Hebrew Bible, there is, however, a reference in Daniel 8:1 alluding to Baltasar's 3rd-year of reign, including a reference to Baltasar's death in Daniel 5:30–31. According to Rabbeinu Chananel on BT Megillah 11b, the seventy-year period spoken of by Jeremiah (25:11–12; 29:10) and by Daniel (9:1–2) refers to the period of time from the destruction of Jerusalem in the days of Nebuchadnezzar to the 2nd-year of the reign of Darius the Great, the same year being the 3rd and final year of Baltasar's reign.)
Total number of years:	67 years	71 years
Successive Persian rulers	Conventional chronology	Seder Olam's chronology
Herodotus notes in his Histories that Cyrus the Great reigned 29 years. However, from Cyrus's taking of Babylon in the 17th year of the reign of Nabonidus, only 9 years remained of Cyrus's 29-year reign. This view is corroborated by Ptolemy's Canon. The nine years of Cyrus's reign as mentioned by him only reflect the number of regnal years remaining after Cyrus the Great conquered Babylon in 539 BCE. Cyrus is thought to have died in 530 BCE.		
Cyrus the Great	29 years (Note: In Parker's and Dubberstein's Babylonian Chronology, 626 B.C. – A.D. 75, p. 14, Cyrus's reign takes up where Nabonidus' reign ends. The nine years given for Cyrus only reflect the number of regnal years remaining after Cyrus the Great conquered Babylon in 539 BCE, bringing an end to Nabonidus' seventeen-year reign. Cyrus is thought to have died in 530 BCE.)	3 years (Note: The only reference in the Hebrew Bible mentioning the regnal years of Cyrus the Great is found in Daniel 10:1, viz., "In the third year of Cyrus king of Persia, etc." There is no indication as to how long he reigned.)
Cambyses (Note: In the Talmud (Megillah 11b), Cambyses is not mentioned, but is replaced by Ahasuerus who is thought to have succeeded Cyrus the Great)	[Cambyses] 7 years and 5 months (Note: It is to be noted that historians differ as to the number of his regnal years. Manetho puts down for this king that he reigned 5 years over his own kingdom in Persia, but 6 years over Egypt. Ptolemy's Canon writes that he reigned 8 years.)	[Ahasuerus] 14 years (Note: The regnal years for this king (14 years according to the Talmud), are not stated explicitly in the Hebrew Bible, and are thought to have only been inferred by the occurrence of four explicit timeframes mentioned in the Scroll of Esther and one that is inexplicit: the first being that Ahasuerus threw a large banqueting feast for his grandees and governors that lasted 180 days during the 3rd year of his reign [Esther 1:3]; the second being that he chose Esther (Hadassah) for his consort during the 7th year of his reign [Esther 2:16]; and the third being that during the 12th year of his reign [Esther 3:7], Haman desired to exterminate the entire Jewish nation and had contrived to commence the killing on a given day of a given month in the following year. On the following year [Esther 9:1], being now the 13th year of Ahasuerus, these orders were rescinded by the king's directives and the Jews found respite. Mordechai is said to have prospered from that time forward, while he and Esther sent out instructions on how the people of Israel were to observe the Purim festival: an allusion to the 14th year.)
The Magi	7 months	---
Darius, the son of Hystaspes	36 years	2 years (Note: These two years are only mentioned by the Talmud (Megillah 11b) so as to mark the conclusion of the 70-year period of Jerusalem's destruction, when Darius, during his 2nd-year of reign, laid the foundation for the Second Temple's rebuilding. It does not imply the complete regnal years of Darius' reign.) [36 years] (Note: According to the Talmud (Megillah 11b), this Darius is thought to have been the son of Ahasuerus, based on a verse in Daniel 9:1. Seder Olam erroneously places this Darius as a contemporary with Alexander the Great, and the last of the Persian kings. In conventional chronology, Darius the Great was not the son of Ahasuerus, but rather the son of Hystaspes, and is said to have reigned 36 years, and was succeeded by his son Xerxes. However, in Seder Olam's chronology, Darius is mentioned only with respect to his 2nd-year of reign when he laid the foundation of the Second Temple (356 BCE), a crucial point of reference considering that it is thought to have marked the end of the seventy-year period of Jerusalem's destruction. According to Ezra 6:15, Darius went on to fully complete the Temple in the sixth year of his reign (352 BCE), but since the entire period of Persian hegemony over Israel during the time of the Second Temple was thought by Seder Olam to have been a mere 34 years (from 352 BCE to 318 BCE), this would imply that Grecian (Macedonian) hegemony over Israel began in 318 BCE, at the conclusion of Darius the Great's reign, or else at the beginning Xerxes' reign, when the Persian army was defeated by Alexander the Great. Modern scholarship has obviated the clear discrepancy in Seder Olam's chronology by saying that Tannaic scholars confounded Darius the Great with Darius III, and which caused the rabbis to omit ten other successive kings after Darius the Great.)
Xerxes (Artaxerxes), the Great, b. Darius (Note: According to Josephus (Antiquities 11.5.1–5), Ezra ascends to the Land of Israel, in the seventh year of his reign.)	21 years	---
Artabanus	7 months	---
Artaxerxes (Cyrus) b. Xerxes the Great (Ahasuerus) (Note: By some accounts, he is said to have also borne the name Ahasuerus, a contemporary of Esther and Mordecai.)	41 years	---
Xerxes	2 months	---
Sogdianus	7 months	---
Darius, the son of Xerxes	19 years	---
Artaxerxes II Mnemon (Note: According to Isaac Abarbanel, this ruler is the same as Ahasuerus (אחשורוש), who reigned in the days of Esther and Mordecai. According to Abarbanel, some say that he reigned 14 years, while others say that he reigned 40 years.)	46 years	---
Artaxerxes III Ochus	21 years	---
Artaxerxes IV Arses	2 years	---
Darius III Codomannus	4 years	---
Total number of years:	228 years + 4 mo. (Note: Years may vary depending on source used. Most authorities hold that the Persian period in the Land of Israel commenced in the year 539 BCE, and ended in 332 BCE, with Alexander the Great's victory over the Persians. Mitchell First, who puts the Persian period at 207 years, reckons these years from when Cyrus first took Babylon in 539 BCE, rather than from Cyrus's first year of reign.)	53 years

=== The Sabbatical year as a means to determine events ===
The Jubilee and Sabbatical year provided a long-term means for dating events. Unfortunately, the Jewish method of calculating the recurring Sabbatical year (Shmita) has been greatly misunderstood by modern chroniclers of history, owing to their unfamiliarity with Jewish practice, largely due to its being ensconced in the Hebrew language, and which has led to many speculations and inconsistencies in computations. According to Maimonides (Mishne Torah, Hil. Shmita ve-Yovel 10:7), during the Second Temple period, the seven-year cycle which repeated itself every seven years was actually dependent upon the fixation of the Jubilee, or the fiftieth year, which year temporarily broke off the counting of the seven-year cycle. Moreover, the laws governing the Jubilee (e.g. release of Hebrew bondmen, and the return of leased property to its original owners, etc.) were never applied all throughout the Second Temple period, but the Jubilee was being used during the period of the Second Temple in order to fix and sanctify thereby the Sabbatical year. A Sabbatical year could not be fixed without the year of the Jubilee, since the Jubilee serves to break-off the 7 x 7-year cycle, before resuming its count once again in the 51st year. While the 49th year is also a Sabbatical year, the fiftieth year is not the 1st year in a new seven-year cycle, but rather is the Jubilee. Its number is not incorporated into the seven-year cycle. Rather, the new seven-year cycle begins afresh in the 51st year, and in this manner is the cycle repeated. After the Temple's destruction, the people began a new practice to number each seventh year as a Sabbatical year, without the necessity of adding a fiftieth year.

According to Maimonides (1138-1205), the reckoning of the Sabbatical years and Jubilees was renewed in Israel when Ezra the Scribe came up to the land in the Temple's seventh year (346 BCE), and which same year became the 1st-year of the seven-year cycle, the first Sabbatical year being made seven years later when the Temple had stood for thirteen years. Maimonides, in his Responsa, repeats the same claims, but is less specific. Prior to Ezra's arrival, the Sabbatical years and Jubilee had been broken-off during the years of exile. This renewed counting, which Ezra initiated in the Temple's seventh year (six years after its rebuilding), happened to fall in anno 346 BCE, which year marked the 1st year of the new seven-year cycle.

Arguments in favor of the priority of this Jewish tradition are had in a statement made in the First Book of Maccabees, and later cited by Josephus in his Antiquities, where it is learnt that the "year 150 of the Seleucid dominion" was a Sabbatical year in the Land of Israel. This same year corresponds to the Fall of 162 BCE (lunar month Tishri), continuing unto the Fall of the following year in 161 BCE (lunar month Elul). By taking the year in which the seven-year cycle was reinstated in Israel with Ezra's return in 346 BCE (accounting for the adjustment of the Jubilee every 50 years and beginning anew the seven-year cycle in the 51st year), the year 162/161 BCE (being the 150th year of the Seleucid era) was, indeed, a Sabbatical year.

Other Sabbatical years mentioned by Josephus are anno 178 Seleucid era, corresponding with 134 BCE–133 BCE, and anno 271 Seleucid era, corresponding with 41 BCE–40 BCE, when Herod and Sosius captured Jerusalem, effectively ending the Hasmonean dominion. Moreover, according to Jewish tradition, the destruction of, both, the First and the Second Temple was in a post-sabbatical year, meaning, in the 1st year of the seven-year cycle. In all these cases, the dates of these events as brought down by conventional non-Jewish chronology cannot possibly coincide with the Sabbatical year and still be faithful to the Seleucid era counting. Only when viewed through the lens of Jewish tradition is there complete harmony in these dates.

== Josephus's timeline of events ==
It is difficult to reconcile Josephus's history of the Second Temple period with that of rabbinic tradition, if not impossible. Although the Seleucid era dates and Olympiads penned by Josephus are, indeed, accurate (see infra) and do not contradict rabbinic tradition, Josephus's accounts of the Jewish high priests and the great span of time in which they all officiated would make the Second Temple appear to have stood six-hundred and thirty-nine years.

Josephus, in his historical works, often makes use of the Seleucid era counting to mark important events, as well as the Olympiad era. Occasionally, he will use both dating systems to describe a single event. The Seleucid era counting began in 312/11 BCE.

- 326 BCE: Death of Alexander the Great. Date corresponds with the 114th Olympiad
- 169 BCE: King Antiochus invades Jerusalem and takes the city without fighting. Date corresponds with the 143rd year of the Seleucid era
- December 167 BCE: King Antiochus plunders the Temple in Jerusalem. Date corresponds with the 145th year of the Seleucid era and the 4th year of the 153rd Olympiad (168 BCE–167 BCE)
- December 164 BCE: The Temple in Jerusalem re-dedicated this same year, after having been defiled for three years. Date corresponds with the 148th year of the Seleucid era (164 BCE–163 BCE), and the 4th year of the 154th Olympiad
- September 163 BCE: Antiochus Epiphanes dies in this same year, and his son, Antiochus Eupator, begins to reign. This year corresponds to the 149th year of the Seleucid era (163 BCE–162 BCE)
- September 162 BCE: The 150th year of the Seleucid era (162 BCE–161 BCE), which same year happened to be a Sabbatical Year
- 141 BCE: Date marks the beginning of the reign and high priesthood of Simon b. Mattithiah the Hasmonean, brother of Judas Maccabeus. Date corresponds to the 170th year of the Seleucid era
- 133 BCE: Antiochus the Pious invades Judaea, which date corresponds with the 3rd yr of the 162nd Olympiad, also the 1st year of John Hyrcanus.
- June 130 BCE: Antiochus the Pious slain in battle, during which same year Pentecost (Shavu'ot) fell next to the Sabbath day.
- 73 BCE: Hyrcanus II made High Priest of Israel, after the death of his father, Alexander Jannaeus. Year corresponds with the 3rd year of the 177th Olympiad.
- June 67 BCE: Pompey captures Jerusalem, in the year which corresponds with the 1st year of the 179th Olympiad, and precisely 27 years before Herod the Great took the city.
- 44 BCE: Herod the Great declared the king of Judea in Rome by Mark Antony, which year corresponded to the 4th year of the 184th Olympiad.
- 41 BCE: Herod the Great begins reign in Jerusalem, which year corresponds to the 3rd year of 185th Olympiad.
- 34 BCE: Battle of Actium, corresponds with 2nd year of 187th Olympiad, and seventh year of King Herod's reign
- 7 BCE: Death of King Herod the Great, after reigning 34 years from his taking Jerusalem.

Assuming that the year of the Second Temple's destruction is the same for both Josephus and Seder Olam, in 68 CE, the following discrepancies are irreconcilable:

Comparative Jewish Chronology
Event	Josephus	Seder Olam
Creation of Adam	[...]	3761 BCE (1 anno mundi)
Great Deluge (in time of Noah)	[...]	2105 BCE (1656 anno mundi)
From the creation of Adam to the Great Deluge	2262 years	1656 years
Israel's departure from Egypt	[...]	1312 BCE (2448 anno mundi)
First Temple's duration	470 years (411 years)	410 years
From destruction of First Temple to the beginning of the exiles' return to Jerusalem	19th year of reign of Nebuchadnezzar till after 50 years	19th year of reign of Nebuchadnezzar till after 52 years (422 BCE–370 BCE)
Beginning and end of 70 years of captivity	19th-year of reign of Nebuchadnezzar till the 1st year of Cyrus (roughly corresponding with the 17th year of the reign of Nabonnedus)	Destruction of First Temple till the building of the Second Temple (the destruction of Jerusalem) (422 BCE–352 BCE)
Building of Second Temple under Darius (Artaxerxes)	Date: 571 BCE	Date: 352 BCE
Second Temple's duration	639 years	420 years
Beginning of new seven-year cycle under Ezra	Date: 533 BCE	Date: 346 BCE
Years of Persian dominion over Israel	(571 BCE–335 BCE)	34 years (352 BCE–318 BCE)
Years of Grecian dominion over Israel	170 years (335 BCE–165 BCE)	180 years (318 BCE–138 BCE)
Duration of the Hasmonean dynasty	126 years (165 BCE–39 BCE)	103 years (138 BCE–35 BCE)
Duration of Herodian dynasty	107 years (39 BCE–68 CE)	103 years (35 BCE–68 CE)

=== Davidic line ===
Several vital clues are provided by the 2nd-century authors of Seder Olam and the Tosefta, as to the placement of events in relation to the Jubilee and seven year cycle. Although no dates are provided in ancient records, general time-frames for certain events are also provided by an inference to their relation to either the First Temple's building or to the First Temple's destruction, and which Temple is said to have stood 410 years. Since, according to Jewish oral tradition, the destruction of the First Temple occurred in 422 BCE, a year which also corresponded to the 1st-year of the seven-year cycle, scholars have sought to plot all events described in the Hebrew Scriptures based on these reference points. Other references include such facts (as brought down in Seder Olam) that the 11th-year of Solomon's reign, when he completed his building of the First Temple, was in the 4th-year of the seven-year cycle, or, similarly, that Jehoiachin's exile began 25 years before the next Jubilee and during the fourth year of a Sabbatical year, or that the 18th-year of Josiah's reign was the year of Jubilee, and that the 14th-year after the First Temple's destruction was also a Jubilee.

Moreover, the interval between the First Temple's destruction in 422 BCE and the Second Temple's destruction in 68 CE is put at 490 years.

In the Jewish custom of recollecting regnal years of kings, the 1st day of the lunar month Nisan marks a New Year for kings, meaning, from this date was calculated the years of the reign of Israelite kings; thus if a king was enthroned in the preceding month, Adar, he begins his second year of reign in the next lunar month, following the 1st of Nisan. Based on this unique way of reckoning regnal years, if King X died in the lunar month Nisan in the year 2022, and King XX succeeded him on the throne in Nisan of 2022, both kings are reckoned as having reigned one year in 2022. All dates provided in the following table showing King David's line of succession are, therefore, made subject to this caveat.

Seder Olam's delineation of David's dynasty (click to open)

Seder Olam's delineation of David's dynasty (based on RAVAD's calculations)
Event	Anno BCE	Seven Year Cycle / Jubilee
David becomes king of Judah, after the death of King Saul. Reigned 40 years.	896 BCE	5th-year of seven-year cycle
	895 BCE	6th-year of seven-year cycle
	894 BCE	Sabbatical year
	893 BCE	1st-year of seven-year cycle
	892 BCE	2nd-year of seven-year cycle
	891 BCE	3rd-year of seven-year cycle
	890 BCE	4th-year of seven-year cycle
	889 BCE	5th-year of seven-year cycle
Eighth year of David's reign. David moves to Jerusalem and begins to reign over all the tribes of Israel.	888 BCE	6th-year of seven-year cycle
	887 BCE	Sabbatical year
	886 BCE	1st-year of seven-year cycle
	885 BCE	2nd-year of seven-year cycle
	884 BCE	3rd-year of seven-year cycle
	883 BCE	4th-year of seven-year cycle
	882 BCE	5th-year of seven-year cycle
	881 BCE	6th-year of seven-year cycle
	880 BCE	Sabbatical year
	879 BCE	1st-year of seven-year cycle
	878 BCE	2nd-year of seven-year cycle
	877 BCE	3rd-year of seven-year cycle
	876 BCE	4th-year of seven-year cycle
	875 BCE	5th-year of seven-year cycle
	874 BCE	6th-year of seven-year cycle
	873 BCE	Sabbatical year
	872 BCE	1st-year of seven-year cycle
	871 BCE	2nd-year of seven-year cycle
	870 BCE	3rd-year of seven-year cycle
	869 BCE	4th-year of seven-year cycle
	868 BCE	5th-year of seven-year cycle
	867 BCE	6th-year of seven-year cycle
	866 BCE	Sabbatical year
	865 BCE	1st-year of seven-year cycle
	864 BCE	2nd-year of seven-year cycle
	863 BCE	3rd-year of seven-year cycle
	862 BCE	4th-year of seven-year cycle
	861 BCE	5th-year of seven-year cycle
	860 BCE	6th-year of seven-year cycle
	859 BCE	Sabbatical year
	858 BCE	Jubilee
	857 BCE	1st-year of seven-year cycle
Solomon ascends the throne of Judah. Reigned 40 years.	856 BCE	2nd-year of seven-year cycle
	855 BCE	3rd-year of seven-year cycle
	854 BCE	4th-year of seven-year cycle
	853 BCE	5th-year of seven-year cycle
Solomon lays the foundation of the Temple in the 4th year of his reign. Solomon marries the daughter of Pharaoh.	852 BCE	6th-year of seven-year cycle
	851 BCE	Sabbatical year
	850 BCE	1st-year of seven-year cycle
	849 BCE	2nd-year of seven-year cycle
	848 BCE	3rd-year of seven-year cycle
	847 BCE	4th-year of seven-year cycle
	846 BCE	5th-year of seven-year cycle
Year marks the 11th-year of Solomon's reign. First Temple completed. (Ravad, deviating from the tradition held in the Tosefta (Zevahim 13:6), wrote that the First Temple stood 427 [sic] years [424 years], namely, from 846/845 BCE to 422 BCE)	845 BCE	6th-year of seven-year cycle
	844 BCE	Sabbatical year
	843 BCE	1st-year of seven-year cycle
	842 BCE	2nd-year of seven-year cycle
	841 BCE	3rd-year of seven-year cycle
	840 BCE	4th-year of seven-year cycle
	839 BCE	5th-year of seven-year cycle
	838 BCE	6th-year of seven-year cycle
	837 BCE	Sabbatical year
	836 BCE	1st-year of seven-year cycle
	835 BCE	2nd-year of seven-year cycle
	834 BCE	3rd-year of seven-year cycle
	833 BCE	4th-year of seven-year cycle
	832 BCE	5th-year of seven-year cycle
	831 BCE	6th-year of seven-year cycle
	830 BCE	Sabbatical year
	829 BCE	1st-year of seven-year cycle
	828 BCE	2nd-year of seven-year cycle
	827 BCE	3rd-year of seven-year cycle
	826 BCE	4th-year of seven-year cycle
	825 BCE	5th-year of seven-year cycle
	824 BCE	6th-year of seven-year cycle
	823 BCE	Sabbatical year
	822 BCE	1st-year of seven-year cycle
	821 BCE	2nd-year of seven-year cycle
	820 BCE	3rd-year of seven-year cycle
	819 BCE	4th-year of seven-year cycle
	818 BCE	5th-year of seven-year cycle
	817 BCE	6th-year of seven-year cycle
Rehoboam begins reign over Judah. Reigned 17 years.	816 BCE	Sabbatical year
	815 BCE	1st-year of seven-year cycle
	814 BCE	2nd-year of seven-year cycle
	813 BCE	3rd-year of seven-year cycle
	812 BCE	4th-year of seven-year cycle
Shishak, king of Egypt, invades Judah.	811 BCE	5th-year of seven-year cycle
	810 BCE	6th-year of seven-year cycle
	809 BCE	Sabbatical year
	808 BCE	Jubilee
	807 BCE	1st-year of seven-year cycle
	806 BCE	2nd-year of seven-year cycle
	805 BCE	3rd-year of seven-year cycle
	804 BCE	4th-year of seven-year cycle
	803 BCE	5th-year of seven-year cycle
	802 BCE	6th-year of seven-year cycle
	801 BCE	Sabbatical year
	800 BCE	1st-year of seven-year cycle
Abijah (also called Abiam) begins reign over Judah. Reigned 3 years.	799 BCE	2nd-year of seven-year cycle
	798 BCE	3rd-year of seven-year cycle
	797 BCE	4th-year of seven-year cycle
Asa begins his rule over Judah. Reigned 41 years.	796 BCE	5th-year of seven-year cycle
	795 BCE	6th-year of seven-year cycle
	794 BCE	Sabbatical year
	793 BCE	1st-year of seven-year cycle
	792 BCE	2nd-year of seven-year cycle
	791 BCE	3rd-year of seven-year cycle
	790 BCE	4th-year of seven-year cycle
	789 BCE	5th-year of seven-year cycle
	788 BCE	6th-year of seven-year cycle
	787 BCE	Sabbatical year
	786 BCE	1st-year of seven-year cycle
	785 BCE	2nd-year of seven-year cycle
	784 BCE	3rd-year of seven-year cycle
	783 BCE	4th-year of seven-year cycle
	782 BCE	5th-year of seven-year cycle
	781 BCE	6th-year of seven-year cycle
	780 BCE	Sabbatical year
	779 BCE	1st-year of seven-year cycle
	778 BCE	2nd-year of seven-year cycle
	777 BCE	3rd-year of seven-year cycle
	776 BCE	4th-year of seven-year cycle
	775 BCE	5th-year of seven-year cycle
	774 BCE	6th-year of seven-year cycle
	773 BCE	Sabbatical year
	772 BCE	1st-year of seven-year cycle
	771 BCE	2nd-year of seven-year cycle
	770 BCE	3rd-year of seven-year cycle
	769 BCE	4th-year of seven-year cycle
	768 BCE	5th-year of seven-year cycle
	767 BCE	6th-year of seven-year cycle
	766 BCE	Sabbatical year
	765 BCE	1st-year of seven-year cycle
	764 BCE	2nd-year of seven-year cycle
	763 BCE	3rd-year of seven-year cycle
	762 BCE	4th-year of seven-year cycle
	761 BCE	5th-year of seven-year cycle
	760 BCE	6th-year of seven-year cycle
	759 BCE	Sabbatical year
	758 BCE	Jubilee
	757 BCE	1st-year of seven-year cycle
	756 BCE	2nd-year of seven-year cycle
Jehoshaphat becomes king of Judah. Reigned 25 years.	755 BCE	3rd-year of seven-year cycle
	754 BCE	4th-year of seven-year cycle
	753 BCE	5th-year of seven-year cycle
	752 BCE	6th-year of seven-year cycle
	751 BCE	Sabbatical year
	750 BCE	1st-year of seven-year cycle
	749 BCE	2nd-year of seven-year cycle
	748 BCE	3rd-year of seven-year cycle
	747 BCE	4th-year of seven-year cycle
	746 BCE	5th-year of seven-year cycle
	745 BCE	6th-year of seven-year cycle
	744 BCE	Sabbatical year
	743 BCE	1st-year of seven-year cycle
	742 BCE	2nd-year of seven-year cycle
	741 BCE	3rd-year of seven-year cycle
	740 BCE	4th-year of seven-year cycle
	739 BCE	5th-year of seven-year cycle
	738 BCE	6th-year of seven-year cycle
	737 BCE	Sabbatical year
	736 BCE	1st-year of seven-year cycle
	735 BCE	2nd-year of seven-year cycle
	734 BCE	3rd-year of seven-year cycle
	733 BCE	4th-year of seven-year cycle
	732 BCE	5th-year of seven-year cycle
	731 BCE	6th-year of seven-year cycle
Jehoram made king over Judah. Reigned 8 years.	730 BCE	Sabbatical year
	729 BCE	1st-year of seven-year cycle
	728 BCE	2nd-year of seven-year cycle
	727 BCE	3rd-year of seven-year cycle
	726 BCE	4th-year of seven-year cycle
	725 BCE	5th-year of seven-year cycle
	724 BCE	6th-year of seven-year cycle
	723 BCE	Sabbatical year
Ahaziah made king over Judah. Reigned 1 year.	722 BCE	1st-year of seven-year cycle
Athaliah usurps authority as queen over Judah. Reigned 6 years.	721 BCE	2nd-year of seven-year cycle
	720 BCE	3rd-year of seven-year cycle
	719 BCE	4th-year of seven-year cycle
	718 BCE	5th-year of seven-year cycle
	717 BCE	6th-year of seven-year cycle
	716 BCE	Sabbatical year
Jehoash made king of Judah. Reigned 40 years.	715 BCE	1st-year of seven-year cycle
	714 BCE	2nd-year of seven-year cycle
	713 BCE	3rd-year of seven-year cycle
	712 BCE	4th-year of seven-year cycle
	711 BCE	5th-year of seven-year cycle
	710 BCE	6th-year of seven-year cycle
	709 BCE	Sabbatical year
	708 BCE	Jubilee
	707 BCE	1st-year of seven-year cycle
	706 BCE	2nd-year of seven-year cycle
	705 BCE	3rd-year of seven-year cycle
	704 BCE	4th-year of seven-year cycle
	703 BCE	5th-year of seven-year cycle
	702 BCE	6th-year of seven-year cycle
	701 BCE	Sabbatical year
	700 BCE	1st-year of seven-year cycle
	699 BCE	2nd-year of seven-year cycle
	698 BCE	3rd-year of seven-year cycle
	697 BCE	4th-year of seven-year cycle
	696 BCE	5th-year of seven-year cycle
	695 BCE	6th-year of seven-year cycle
	694 BCE	Sabbatical year
	693 BCE	1st-year of seven-year cycle
Year marks 23rd year of Jehoash's reign. During this year, he refurbished the Temple, which year fell out 155 [sic] [154] years after Solomon completed the Temple (in 846/845 BCE).	692 BCE	2nd-year of seven-year cycle
	691 BCE	3rd-year of seven-year cycle
	690 BCE	4th-year of seven-year cycle
	689 BCE	5th-year of seven-year cycle
	688 BCE	6th-year of seven-year cycle
	687 BCE	Sabbatical year
	686 BCE	1st-year of seven-year cycle
	685 BCE	2nd-year of seven-year cycle
	684 BCE	3rd-year of seven-year cycle
	683 BCE	4th-year of seven-year cycle
	682 BCE	5th-year of seven-year cycle
	681 BCE	6th-year of seven-year cycle
	680 BCE	Sabbatical year
	679 BCE	1st-year of seven-year cycle
	678 BCE	2nd-year of seven-year cycle
	677 BCE	3rd-year of seven-year cycle
	676 BCE	4th-year of seven-year cycle
Amaziah begins to reign over Judah. Reigned 29 years.	675 BCE	5th-year of seven-year cycle
	674 BCE	6th-year of seven-year cycle
	673 BCE	Sabbatical year
	672 BCE	1st-year of seven-year cycle
	671 BCE	2nd-year of seven-year cycle
	670 BCE	3rd-year of seven-year cycle
	669 BCE	4th-year of seven-year cycle
	668 BCE	5th-year of seven-year cycle
	667 BCE	6th-year of seven-year cycle
	666 BCE	Sabbatical year
	665 BCE	1st-year of seven-year cycle
	664 BCE	2nd-year of seven-year cycle
	663 BCE	3rd-year of seven-year cycle
	662 BCE	4th-year of seven-year cycle
	661 BCE	5th-year of seven-year cycle
	660 BCE	6th-year of seven-year cycle
	659 BCE	Sabbatical year
	658 BCE	Jubilee
	657 BCE	1st-year of seven-year cycle
	656 BCE	2nd-year of seven-year cycle
	655 BCE	3rd-year of seven-year cycle
	654 BCE	4th-year of seven-year cycle
	653 BCE	5th-year of seven-year cycle
	652 BCE	6th-year of seven-year cycle
	651 BCE	Sabbatical year
	650 BCE	1st-year of seven-year cycle
	649 BCE	2nd-year of seven-year cycle
	648 BCE	3rd-year of seven-year cycle
	647 BCE	4th-year of seven-year cycle
Azariah, also called Uzziah, begins to reign over Judah. Reigned 52 years.	646 BCE	5th-year of seven-year cycle
	645 BCE	6th-year of seven-year cycle
	644 BCE	Sabbatical year
	643 BCE	1st-year of seven-year cycle
	642 BCE	2nd-year of seven-year cycle
	641 BCE	3rd-year of seven-year cycle
	640 BCE	4th-year of seven-year cycle
	639 BCE	5th-year of seven-year cycle
	638 BCE	6th-year of seven-year cycle
	637 BCE	Sabbatical year
	636 BCE	1st-year of seven-year cycle
	635 BCE	2nd-year of seven-year cycle
	634 BCE	3rd-year of seven-year cycle
	633 BCE	4th-year of seven-year cycle
	632 BCE	5th-year of seven-year cycle
	631 BCE	6th-year of seven-year cycle
	630 BCE	Sabbatical year
	629 BCE	1st-year of seven-year cycle
	628 BCE	2nd-year of seven-year cycle
	627 BCE	3rd-year of seven-year cycle
	626 BCE	4th-year of seven-year cycle
	625 BCE	5th-year of seven-year cycle
	624 BCE	6th-year of seven-year cycle
	623 BCE	Sabbatical year
	622 BCE	1st-year of seven-year cycle
	621 BCE	2nd-year of seven-year cycle
	620 BCE	3rd-year of seven-year cycle
	619 BCE	4th-year of seven-year cycle
	618 BCE	5th-year of seven-year cycle
	617 BCE	6th-year of seven-year cycle
	616 BCE	Sabbatical year
	615 BCE	1st-year of seven-year cycle
	614 BCE	2nd-year of seven-year cycle
	613 BCE	3rd-year of seven-year cycle
	612 BCE	4th-year of seven-year cycle
	611 BCE	5th-year of seven-year cycle
	610 BCE	6th-year of seven-year cycle
	609 BCE	Sabbatical year
	608 BCE	Jubilee
	607 BCE	1st-year of seven-year cycle
	606 BCE	2nd-year of seven-year cycle
	605 BCE	3rd-year of seven-year cycle
	604 BCE	4th-year of seven-year cycle
	603 BCE	5th-year of seven-year cycle
	602 BCE	6th-year of seven-year cycle
	601 BCE	Sabbatical year
	600 BCE	1st-year of seven-year cycle
	599 BCE	2nd-year of seven-year cycle
	598 BCE	3rd-year of seven-year cycle
	597 BCE	4th-year of seven-year cycle
	596 BCE	5th-year of seven-year cycle
	595 BCE	6th-year of seven-year cycle
Jotham begins to reign over Judah. Reigned 16 years.	594 BCE	Sabbatical year
	593 BCE	1st-year of seven-year cycle
	592 BCE	2nd-year of seven-year cycle
	591 BCE	3rd-year of seven-year cycle
	590 BCE	4th-year of seven-year cycle
	589 BCE	5th-year of seven-year cycle
	588 BCE	6th-year of seven-year cycle
	587 BCE	Sabbatical year
	586 BCE	1st-year of seven-year cycle
	585 BCE	2nd-year of seven-year cycle
	584 BCE	3rd-year of seven-year cycle
	583 BCE	4th-year of seven-year cycle
	582 BCE	5th-year of seven-year cycle
	581 BCE	6th-year of seven-year cycle
	580 BCE	Sabbatical year
	579 BCE	1st-year of seven-year cycle
Ahaz becomes the king of Judah. Reigned 16 years.	578 BCE	2nd-year of seven-year cycle
	577 BCE	3rd-year of seven-year cycle
	576 BCE	4th-year of seven-year cycle
	575 BCE	5th-year of seven-year cycle
	574 BCE	6th-year of seven-year cycle
	573 BCE	Sabbatical year
	572 BCE	1st-year of seven-year cycle
	571 BCE	2nd-year of seven-year cycle
	570 BCE	3rd-year of seven-year cycle
	569 BCE	4th-year of seven-year cycle
	568 BCE	5th-year of seven-year cycle
	567 BCE	6th-year of seven-year cycle
	566 BCE	Sabbatical year
	565 BCE	1st-year of seven-year cycle
	564 BCE	2nd-year of seven-year cycle
	563 BCE	3rd-year of seven-year cycle
Hezekiah is made the king of Judah. Reigned 29 years.	562 BCE	4th-year of seven-year cycle
	561 BCE	5th-year of seven-year cycle
	560 BCE	6th-year of seven-year cycle
	559 BCE	Sabbatical year
Shalmaneser lays siege to Samaria	558 BCE	Jubilee
	557 BCE	1st-year of seven-year cycle
Year marks the 6th year of Hezekiah's reign, when Shalmaneser captured Samaria and exiled the northern kingdom of Israel and brought them into Assyria.	556 BCE	2nd-year of seven-year cycle
	555 BCE	3rd-year of seven-year cycle
	554 BCE	4th-year of seven-year cycle
	553 BCE	5th-year of seven-year cycle
	552 BCE	6th-year of seven-year cycle
	551 BCE	Sabbatical year
	550 BCE	1st-year of seven-year cycle
	549 BCE	2nd-year of seven-year cycle
Year marks the 14th year of Hezekiah's reign, when Sennacherib captured the fortified cities of Judah.	548 BCE	3rd-year of seven-year cycle
	547 BCE	4th-year of seven-year cycle
	546 BCE	5th-year of seven-year cycle
	545 BCE	6th-year of seven-year cycle
	544 BCE	Sabbatical year
	543 BCE	1st-year of seven-year cycle
	542 BCE	2nd-year of seven-year cycle
	541 BCE	3rd-year of seven-year cycle
	540 BCE	4th-year of seven-year cycle
	539 BCE	5th-year of seven-year cycle
	538 BCE	6th-year of seven-year cycle
	537 BCE	Sabbatical year
	536 BCE	1st-year of seven-year cycle
	535 BCE	2nd-year of seven-year cycle
	534 BCE	3rd-year of seven-year cycle
Manasseh is made the king of Judah. Reigned 55 years.	533 BCE	4th-year of seven-year cycle
	532 BCE	5th-year of seven-year cycle
	531 BCE	6th-year of seven-year cycle
	530 BCE	Sabbatical year
	529 BCE	1st-year of seven-year cycle
	528 BCE	2nd-year of seven-year cycle
	527 BCE	3rd-year of seven-year cycle
	526 BCE	4th-year of seven-year cycle
	525 BCE	5th-year of seven-year cycle
	524 BCE	6th-year of seven-year cycle
	523 BCE	Sabbatical year
	522 BCE	1st-year of seven-year cycle
	521 BCE	2nd-year of seven-year cycle
	520 BCE	3rd-year of seven-year cycle
	519 BCE	4th-year of seven-year cycle
	518 BCE	5th-year of seven-year cycle
	517 BCE	6th-year of seven-year cycle
	516 BCE	Sabbatical year
	515 BCE	1st-year of seven-year cycle
	514 BCE	2nd-year of seven-year cycle
	513 BCE	3rd-year of seven-year cycle
	512 BCE	4th-year of seven-year cycle
	511 BCE	5th-year of seven-year cycle
	510 BCE	6th-year of seven-year cycle
	509 BCE	Sabbatical year
	508 BCE	Jubilee
	507 BCE	1st-year of seven-year cycle
	506 BCE	2nd-year of seven-year cycle
	505 BCE	3rd-year of seven-year cycle
	504 BCE	4th-year of seven-year cycle
	503 BCE	5th-year of seven-year cycle
	502 BCE	6th-year of seven-year cycle
	501 BCE	Sabbatical year
	500 BCE	1st-year of seven-year cycle
	499 BCE	2nd-year of seven-year cycle
	498 BCE	3rd-year of seven-year cycle
	497 BCE	4th-year of seven-year cycle
	496 BCE	5th-year of seven-year cycle
	495 BCE	6th-year of seven-year cycle
	494 BCE	Sabbatical year
	493 BCE	1st-year of seven-year cycle
	492 BCE	2nd-year of seven-year cycle
	491 BCE	3rd-year of seven-year cycle
	490 BCE	4th-year of seven-year cycle
	489 BCE	5th-year of seven-year cycle
	488 BCE	6th-year of seven-year cycle
	487 BCE	Sabbatical year
	486 BCE	1st-year of seven-year cycle
	485 BCE	2nd-year of seven-year cycle
	484 BCE	3rd-year of seven-year cycle
	483 BCE	4th-year of seven-year cycle
	482 BCE	5th-year of seven-year cycle
	481 BCE	6th-year of seven-year cycle
	480 BCE	Sabbatical year
	479 BCE	1st-year of seven-year cycle
Amon becomes king of Judah. Reigned 2 years.	478 BCE	2nd-year of seven-year cycle
	477 BCE	3rd-year of seven-year cycle
Josiah begins to reign over Judah. Reigned 31 years.	476 BCE	4th-year of seven-year cycle
	475 BCE	5th-year of seven-year cycle
	474 BCE	6th-year of seven-year cycle
	473 BCE	Sabbatical year
	472 BCE	1st-year of seven-year cycle
	471 BCE	2nd-year of seven-year cycle
	470 BCE	3rd-year of seven-year cycle
	469 BCE	4th-year of seven-year cycle
	468 BCE	5th-year of seven-year cycle
	467 BCE	6th-year of seven-year cycle
	466 BCE	Sabbatical year
	465 BCE	1st-year of seven-year cycle
	464 BCE	2nd-year of seven-year cycle
	463 BCE	3rd-year of seven-year cycle
	462 BCE	4th-year of seven-year cycle
	461 BCE	5th-year of seven-year cycle
	460 BCE	6th-year of seven-year cycle
	459 BCE	Sabbatical year
Year marks the 18th-year of Josiah's reign, mentioned in Seder Olam as a year of Jubilee. During this same year, a Torah scroll was found in the Temple and brought to the king.	458 BCE	Jubilee
	457 BCE	1st-year of seven-year cycle
	456 BCE	2nd-year of seven-year cycle
	455 BCE	3rd-year of seven-year cycle
	454 BCE	4th-year of seven-year cycle
	453 BCE	5th-year of seven-year cycle
	452 BCE	6th-year of seven-year cycle
	451 BCE	Sabbatical year
	450 BCE	1st-year of seven-year cycle
	449 BCE	2nd-year of seven-year cycle
	448 BCE	3rd-year of seven-year cycle
	447 BCE	4th-year of seven-year cycle
	446 BCE	5th-year of seven-year cycle
	445 BCE	6th-year of seven-year cycle
Jehoahaz is made king of Judah, but after reigning for 3 months he is deposed by Pharaoh Necho and is taken down to Egypt. Jehoiakim (also known as Eliakim) is made king of Judah. Reigned 11 years.	444 BCE	Sabbatical year
	443 BCE	1st-year of seven-year cycle
	442 BCE	2nd-year of seven-year cycle
Year marks the 4th year of Jehoiakim's reign, when Nebuchadnezzar ascended the throne in Babylonia.	441 BCE	3rd-year of seven-year cycle
Nebuchadnezzar, after defeating the Egyptians, begins to exercise hegemony over Syria, which includes the land of Judah.	440 BCE	4th-year of seven-year cycle
	439 BCE	5th-year of seven-year cycle
	438 BCE	6th-year of seven-year cycle
	437 BCE	Sabbatical year
	436 BCE	1st-year of seven-year cycle
	435 BCE	2nd-year of seven-year cycle
	434 BCE	3rd-year of seven-year cycle
Jehoiachin made king of Judah, but he is deposed after reigning for only 3 months. Zedekiah (formerly called Mataniah) made king of Judah. Reigned 11 years. Year corresponds with 8th- year of Nebuchadnezzar's reign.	433 BCE	4th-year of seven-year cycle
	432 BCE	5th-year of seven-year cycle
	431 BCE	6th-year of seven-year cycle
	430 BCE	Sabbatical year
	429 BCE	1st-year of seven-year cycle
	428 BCE	2nd-year of seven-year cycle
	427 BCE	3rd-year of seven-year cycle
	426 BCE	4th-year of seven-year cycle
	425 BCE	5th-year of seven-year cycle
9th-year of Zedekiah's reign. Nebuchadrezzar lays siege to Jerusalem, because of Zedekiah's rebellion.	424 BCE	6th-year of seven-year cycle
	423 BCE	Sabbatical year
Destruction of First Temple. Zedekiah's 11th year reign comes to an end. Year marks the city's capture after a siege of 18 months. Year corresponds with 19th-year of Nebuchadnezzar's reign.	422 BCE	1st-year of seven-year cycle
	421 BCE	2nd-year of seven-year cycle
	420 BCE	3rd-year of seven-year cycle
	419 BCE	4th-year of seven-year cycle
Nebuchadnezzar exiles an additional 745 people from Judah.	418 BCE	5th-year of seven-year cycle
	417 BCE	6th-year of seven-year cycle
	416 BCE	Sabbatical year
	415 BCE	1st-year of seven-year cycle
	414 BCE	2nd-year of seven-year cycle
	413 BCE	3rd-year of seven-year cycle
	412 BCE	4th-year of seven-year cycle
	411 BCE	5th-year of seven-year cycle
	410 BCE	6th-year of seven-year cycle
	409 BCE	Sabbatical year
Year marks the 14th-year after the First Temple's destruction, and the 25th year after the people's exile under Jehoiachin. Year also a Jubilee.	408 BCE	Jubilee

If the assumption is made that the date implicit in conventional chronology for the destruction of the First Temple is 586 BCE (instead of 422 BCE, as is found in rabbinic chronology), then 164 years should be added to all the dates in the "Seder Olam chronology" column showing David's dynasty.

=== Josephus's enumeration of High Priests during the Second Temple period ===
Josephus painstakingly listed the complete panoply of Jewish high priests who served during the Second Temple period and which, by comparison of dates when each man officiated as high priest, can be used as a time indicator to determine the span of time in which the Second Temple had its existence. It is of primary importance to note that Josephus, who claims that the Second Temple stood 639 years (approximately from 571 BCE), is consistent with his figures and demarcations in time all throughout his histories. For example, Josephus claims that from the Second Temple's building until the end of the tenure of the High Priest Menelaus (removed from office in 162 BCE), there had transpired 414 years, with a total of 15 high priests during that span of time (for an average tenure of 27.6 years per high priest), beginning with Jesus the son of Josadek, and ending with Menelaus. Indeed, a collection of these years amounts to a starting point for the Second Temple in around 576 BCE, within the margin of error for Josephus's figures.

Elsewhere, Josephus makes the remarkable claim that 471 years and 3 months had passed from the time that the exiles returned from the Babylonian captivity to the time that Aristobulus, the son of John Hyrcanus, began his reign as both king and high priest, the beginning of whose reign is put at c. 101 BCE. Indeed, a calculation of these years points to a time when the Jewish exiles were being resettled in the country in c. 572 BCE, one year before the year in which Josephus gives as the Temple's rebuilding in 571 BCE. In Josephus's Antiquities, the same period of en-masse Jewish immigration to the land of Israel after the Babylonian captivity is put at 481 years and 3 months prior to the reign of Aristobulus b. John Hyrcanus, or what would have been c. 582 BCE, some 11 years before the building of the Second Temple.

According to Josephus, there were a total of 83 officiating high priests from the founding of the Israelite nation under Moses and Aaron, the first high priest, until the destruction of the Second Temple. Of these, 28 high priests served the Jewish nation, over a span of 107 years, from Herod the Great until the temple's destruction. The following table, with its approximate dates, lists in chronological order the Jewish high priests that officiated in the Second Temple, from its foundation laid by Darius the Great unto its destruction in the 2nd year of the reign of Vespasian:

List of Jewish High Priests [of the Second Temple] (source: Josephus)
Year	High Priest	Contemporary persons / events	Result
c. 515 BCE	Jeshua b. Josadek (ישוע בן יהוצדק)	Jeshua was the first high priest to serve the nation after Israel's return from the Babylonian exile, and was contemporary with Haggai the prophet and Darius the Great. Jeshua (Joshua) is mentioned in Haggai 1:1, 1:12, 1:14, and in Zechariah 3:1. According to Josephus, from Jeshua b. Josadek to Antiochus Eupator, there were 15 high priests from his posterity, spanning a period of 414 years. This high priest's lineage was replaced thereafter by Alcimus and by the Hasmoneans.	Jeshua was succeeded by his son, Joacim (Yoiakim).
c. 480 BCE	Joacim b. Jeshua (יויקים בן ישוע)	Joacim assumed the title of high priest after his father. Joacim was contemporary with Xerxes, the son of Darius the Great, and with Ezra the scribe. Josephus gives no indication as to how long he served as high priest.	At his death, the high priesthood passed on to his son, Eliasib (Elyashiv).
c. 443 BCE	Eliasib b. Joacim (אלישיב בן יויקים)	Eliasib assumed the title of high priest after his father's death. The wall of Jerusalem was rebuilt during his high priesthood. Eliasib was contemporary with Mordecai and Esther, as well as with Nehemiah who served the Persian king Artaxerxes. Josephus gives no indication as to how long he served as high priest.	At his death, the high priesthood passed on to his son, Joiada (Yoiada).
c. 425 BCE	Joiada b. Eliasib (יוידע בן אלישיב)	Joiada assumed the title of high priest after his father's death. Josephus gives no indication as to how long he served as high priest.	At his death, the high priesthood passed on to his son, Jonathan (Yonathan).
c. 408 BCE	Jonathan b. Joiada (יונתן בן יוידע)	Jonathan assumed the title of high priest after his father's death. Josephus gives no indication as to how long he served as high priest. Jonathan was a contemporary with the Persian king Artaxerxes II. Jonathan's son, Manasseh, married the daughter of Sanballat (satrap of Samaria) and officiated as the first high priest in the Samaritan temple in Mount Gerizim.	At his death, the high priesthood passed on to his son, Jaddua (Yaddua).
c. [?] BCE	Jaddua b. Jonathan (ידוע בן יונתן)	Jaddua assumed the title of high priest after his father's death. Friend and ally with the Persian king Darius III Codomannus, and a contemporary with Alexander the Great, b. Phillip, and who had actually met him. In his days, the temple of the Samaritans was built in Mount Gerizim, with Jaddua's brother, Manasseh, serving as its first high priest. Josephus gives no indication as to how long Jaddua served as high priest.	At his death, the high priesthood passed on to his son, Onias I.
c. 315 BCE	Onias I. b. Jaddua (נחוניו בן ידוע)	Onias I assumed the title of high priest after his father's death. Josephus gives no indication as to how long he served as high priest. Onias I lived around the time of Ptolemy I Soter and Demetrius I of Macedon and would have seen his country taken-over by Ptolemy Soter.	At his death, the high priesthood passed on to Simon, who was called The Just.
c. [?] BCE	Simon the Just b. Onias I (שמעון הצדיק בן נחוניו)	Simon the Just was a highly acclaimed high priest, who is considered by the Sages of Israel to be one of the last remaining illustrious men of the Great Assembly. The Sages say that he served as high priest for 40 years. Simon the Just was a contemporary with Ptolemy Philadelphus.	Simon's son, Onias II, was too young to hold the office of high priest after Simon had died, the office being conferred to Simon's brother, Eleazar.
c. 307 BCE	Eleazar b. Onias I (אלעזר בן נחוניו)	Eleazar was the brother of Simon the Just and served as high priest after the death of Simon the Just. He was also a contemporary with both Ptolemy Philadelphus and Ptolemy Euergetes, and was the high priest that consented in having the Torah translated into Greek, known as the Septuagint (LXX). Josephus leaves no indication as to the number of years in which he officiated as high priest.	Manasseh, who was the uncle of Eleazar, succeeded him in the high priesthood.
c. [?] BCE	Manasseh b. Jaddua (מנשה בן ידוע)	Served as high priest after the death of Eleazar, the high priest. Josephus leaves no indication as to the number of years in which he officiated as high priest.	After Manasseh was deceased, Onias II b. Simon the Just succeeded him in the high priesthood.
before 204–[?] BCE	Onias II b. Simon the Just (נחוניו בן שמעון הצדיק)	Served as high priest after the high priest Manasseh. Onias II was a contemporary with Antiochus III, with Ptolemy Euergetes and with Ptolemy Philopator. Josephus leaves no indication as to the number of years in which he officiated as high priest.	Simon b. Onias II succeeded him in the high priesthood.
c. ? BCE	Shimon b. Onias II (שמעון בן נחוניו)	Served as high priest after the death of his father Onias II, the son of Simon the Just. Josephus leaves no indication as to the number of years in which he officiated as high priest.	Onias III succeeded him in the high priesthood.
c. ? BCE	Onias III b. Shimon (נחוניו בן שמעון)	The office of high priest conferred upon him after the death of the high priest Simon b. Onias II. Josephus leaves no indication as to the number of years in which he officiated as high priest. Onias III was a contemporary with Ptolemy Epiphanes.	Upon the death of Onias III, the high priesthood was conferred upon Jesus (Jason), the son of Simon.
c. [?]–172 BCE	Jesus b. Shimon (called Jason) (יהושע בן שמעון הנקרא יסון)	Presumed to have been appointed high priest by Antiochus Epiphanes after the death of the high priest Onias III.	Jesus (Jason) was removed from the high priesthood by Antiochus Epiphanes, who then appointed Jesus' brother to take his place.
c. 172–162 BCE	Onias IV b. Shimon (called Menelaus) (נחוניו בן שמעון הנקרא מנלאוס)	Made high priest by Ptolemy Philometor, king of Egypt. Brother of the former high priest Jesus (Jason), Onias IV served as Israel's high priest for 10 years, until he was removed from this office by Antiochus Eupator who invaded Judea, and the title of high priest then given to Jacimus. With the end of Onias' priesthood, there had been a total of 15 high priests officiating in the Second Temple from its rebuilding, which same period spanned 414 years, beginning with Jesus the son of Josadek, unto Menelaus (Onias IV).	Antiochus Eupator desecrated the Jewish Temple during his priesthood, in 169 BCE (anno 143 of the Seleucid era). Onias IV was put to death at the insistence of Lysias, the general of Antiochus' army, in Berea (now, Aleppo Syria).
c. 162–159 BCE	Alcimus (called Jacimus) (יקימון / יקים)	Appointed as Israel's high priest by Antiochus Eupator, who held the office of high priest for 3 years This timeframe given for Alcimus is corroborated by the First Book of Maccabees (9:54–56), where it states that Alcimus was stricken with palsy in the 153rd year of the Seleucid era (159/8 BCE), and died shortly thereafter.	With Alcimus' death, the people conferred the high priesthood upon Judas Maccabeus, after whom no man held the position of high priest for a period of seven years
c. 159–156 BCE	Judas b. Matthias (יהודה בן מתתיה חשמונאי הנקרא מקבי)	Judas served as Israel's high priest for 3 years, until his death.	Killed in battle, the high priesthood of Judas was conferred on his brother Jonathan nearly 8 years later.
c. 149–142 BCE	Jonathan b. Matthias (יונתן בן מתתיה חשמונאי)	Jonathan held the title of high priest for 7 years until his death. Prior to this time, there was an interlude of 7 years during which time the high priesthood remained in abeyance (from 156–149 BCE)	At Jonathan's capture and death, the high priesthood was conferred upon his brother Simon
c. 142–134 BCE)	Simon b. Matthias (שמעון בן מתתיה חשמונאי)	In the year 170 of the Seleucid era (corresponding to 142/1 BCE), Simon released Israel from paying tribute to the Macedonian kings. Simon held the title of high priest for nearly 8 years until his death Simon's death is recorded as being in anno 177 of the Seleucid era (corresponding to 135/4 BCE).	At Simon's death, the high priesthood was conferred upon his son, John Hyrcanus
c. 134–101 BCE	John b. Simon (called Hyrcanus I) (יוחנן בן שמעון הנקרא הורקנוס)	John Hyrcanus served as high priest over Israel for 33 years (another opinion says 31 years, and another 30 years). In the Mishnah (Maaser Sheni 5:15, Parah 3:5, et al.) he is mentioned as Yoḥanan Cohen Gadōl (Yohanan the High Priest). Antiochus VII Sidetes (known as Antiochus the Pious) invaded Judea during John Hyrcanus' tenure as high priest, during the 162nd Olympiad (c. 133 BCE). He was contemporary with Ptolemy Lathyrus.	After living an illustrious life as a Pharisee, he later turned Sadducee, and died, leaving his office to his eldest son, Aristobulus.
c. 101–100 BCE	Aristobulus (also called Judas) b. John Hyrcanus (אריסטובלוס)	Eldest son of John Hyrcanus. Assumed the position of, both, high priest and king after his father's death. Served as high priest for only one year. During this year, Aristobulus ruled conjointly with his brother Antigonus.	Aristobulus was succeeded in the high priesthood by his brother Alexander Jannaeus.
c. 100–73 BCE	Alexander Jannaeus b. John Hyrcanus (אלכסנדרוס ינאי)	Alexander Jannaeus who reigned over Israel for a total of 27 years, as both king and high priest In the Talmud and Midrash, he is simply known as Yannai ha-Melekh. The king's brother-in-law was the famous rabbinic sage, Simeon ben Shetach.	Upon Alexander Jannaeus' death his wife officiated as queen over the nation for 9 years. She gave the high priesthood to her son Hyrcanus.
c. 73–64 BCE	Hyrcanus II b. Alexander Jannaeus (הורקנוס בן ינאי)	Appointed by his mother, the wife of Alexander Janneus, to officiate as high priest of the nation, and which position he held for 9 years, until his mother's death.	Upon the death of his mother, Aristobulus (brother of Hyrcanus) usurped the role of high priest
c. 64–61 BCE	Aristobulus II b. Alexander Jannaeus (אריסטובלוס בן ינאי)	He served as high priest for 3 years and 3 months, until Pompey invaded the country and took Jerusalem by force	Pompey removed Aristobulus from the high priesthood and restored his brother Hyrcanus to that office
c. 61–38 BCE	Hyrcanus II b. Alexander Jannaeus (הורקנוס בן ינאי)	Pompey reinstated him as the high priest of Israel, which office and title he held for 24 years more. Contemporary with Julius Caesar with whom a league of friendship was made.	When Herod the Great took the government he put to death the high priest Hyrcanus II
c. 38 BCE	Antigonus b. Aristobulus II (אנטגנס בן אריסטובלוס)	Josephus does not indicate how long he served as high priest.	With the removal of Antigonus from the high priesthood and his being sent in bonds to Antony in Alexandria and later to Antioch where he was killed, Herod began to reign as king in Judea
c. 38–37 BCE	Ananelus the Babylonian (חננאל הבבלי)	Originally from Babylonia and not related to the Hasmoneans, he was made high priest by Herod the Great after Herod had taken the government in the 185th Olympiad, and which same year happened to be a Sabbatical year.	He was temporarily replaced by Aristobulus b. Alexander
c. 37–36 BCE	Aristobulus b. Alexander (אריסטובלוס בן אלכסנדרוס)	Served as high priest of Israel for only 1 year, before being drowned. The last high priest of the Hasmoneans.	After his death, Herod the Great restored Ananelus the Babylonian to the high priesthood
c. 36–[?] BCE	Ananelus the Babylonian (חננאל הבבלי)	Reinstated to his post as high priest by Herod the Great	Succeeded by Jesus b. Phabet, perhaps after the death of Ananel.
c. [?]–28 BCE	Jesus b. Phabet (יהושע בן פיאבת)	Made high priest by Herod the Great. Contemporary with Pollio (Abtalion) the teacher, and his disciple Sameas (Shamiah)	Deprived of the high priesthood around the 13th year of Herod's reign, at which time, the office was conferred on Simon b. Boethus
c. 28 BCE–8 BCE	Simon b. Boethus (שמעון בן ביתוס)	Simon b. Boethus had originally come from Alexandria in Egypt. Made high priest by Herod the Great on account of a marriage with Simon's daughter; Simon b. Boethus being Herod's father-in-law. Later, she was divorced by Herod.	Upon divorcing the high priest's daughter, Herod deprived his father-in-law of the high priesthood, conferring the title upon Matthias b. Theophilus
c. 8 BCE	Mattathias ben Theophilus (מתתיה בן תפלוס)	Made high priest by Herod the Great. Matthias the high priest was born in Jerusalem.	The high priest was unable to officiate in his duties for one day, conferring the office unto Joseph b. Ellemus for one day.
c. 8 BCE	Joseph b. Ellemus (יוסף בן חלים)	Made high priest for one day, because of a mishap that had befallen Matthias b. Theophilus	After serving as high priest on the fast of the Day of Atonement, the high priesthood was restored to Matthias b, Theophilus
c. 8 BCE–7 BCE	Matthias b. Theophilus (מתתיה בן תפלוס)	Reinstated as high priest after recusing himself from his duties on the fast of the Day of Atonement	Herod the Great deprived him of the priesthood, giving it to Matthias' brother-in-law, Joazar b. Boethus.
c. 7 BCE–6 BCE	Joazar b. Boethus (יועזר בן ביתוס)	Made high priest by Herod the Great, shortly before Herod's death. Contemporary with Caesar Augustus	Archelaus deprived him of the high priesthood when he came as ethnarch of Judea.
c. 6 BCE–3 CE	Eleazar b. Boethus (אלעזר בן ביתוס)	Eleazar was appointed high priest by Archelaus, instead of his brother Joazar who held the post before him	Eleazar did not long endure in his role as high priest, as he was soon replaced by Jesus b. Sie.
c. 3 CE	Jesus b. Sie (יהושע בן שיח)	Jesus b. Sie replaced Eleazar during Eleazar's lifetime, but even so, his tenure as high priest was short-lived.	Josephus gives no indication as to how long Jesus b. Sie remained as high priest, but only that Joazar had been reconfirmed in the office of high priest.
c. 3 CE	Joazar b. Boethus (יועזר בן ביתוס)	Josephus notes that the dignity of high priest was conferred on him by the people Joazar may have returned to officiate as high priest after the 9th year of Archelaus' government, when Archelaus was banished by Caesar Augustus to Vienne in Gaul.	Cyrenius deprived Joazar of the high priesthood.
c. 3 CE–11 CE	Ananus b. Seth (חנן בן שת)	Appointed the high priest of Israel by Cyrenius, the governor of Greater Syria, thirty-seven years after Caesar's victory over Antony at Actium.	When Tiberius Caesar ascended to the imperial throne, he sent Valerius Gratus as procurator of Judea, who removed Ananus from the high priesthood and appointed Ismael b. Phabi in his stead.
c. 11–16 CE	Ismael b. Phabi (ישמעאל בן פיאבי)	Ismael had been appointed high priest by Gratus, the Roman procurator of Judea. After a short time, Gratus removed him from his post.	Ismael was succeeded in the high priesthood by Eleazar b. Ananus (Ananias).
c. 16–17 CE	Eleazar b. Ananus (Ananias) (אלעזר בן חנן)	Eleazar was appointed high priest by Gratus, the Roman procurator of Judea.	After serving as high priest of Israel for one year, he was removed from his post and replaced by Simon b. Camithus.
c. 17–18 CE	Simon b. Camithus (שמעון בן קמחית)	Simon was appointed high priest by Gratus, the Roman procurator of Judea.	After serving in the high priesthood for no longer than a year, he was removed from his post and replaced by Joseph Caiaphas.
c. 18–31 CE	Joseph b. Caiaphas (יהוסף כיפה)	Contemporary with Tiberius Caesar	Joseph b. Caiaphas was removed from the high priesthood by Vitellius the President of Syria
c. 31–33 CE	Jonathan b. Ananus (יונתן בן חנן)	Appointed high priest by Vitellius towards the end of Tiberius Caesar's reign	Herod the Tetrarch deprived Jonathan b. Ananus of the high priest and conferred the title on his brother, Theophilus b. Ananus.
c. 33–34 CE	Theophilus b. Ananus (תפלוס בן חנן)	Appointed high priest by Herod the Tetrarch during same year in which Tiberius Caesar died.	King Agrippa I removed Theophilus b. Ananus from his position as high priest and conferred the title upon Simon b. Boethus in his stead.
c. 34–36 CE	Simon b. Boethus (called Cantherus) (שמעון בן ביתוס הנקרא קתרוס)	He had already been high priest before and is the father of one of Herod's wives who was later divorced by him.	King Agrippa I removes Simon b. Boethus, called Cantherus, from the office of high priest and confers the title upon Jonathan b. Ananus, who then declines the honor (having already been high priest before), at which time the title is conferred upon his brother, Matthias b. Ananus.
c. 36 CE	Jonathan b. Ananus (יונתן בן חנן)	Appointed high priest but declines the honor	Jonathan b. Ananus was succeeded in the high priesthood by Matthias b. Ananus. Later, during the reign of Nero, Jonathan was killed by the Sicarii.
c. 36–37 CE	Matthias b. Ananus (מתתיה בן חנן)	Appointed by King Agrippa I. Brother of Jonathan b. Ananus	Matthias b. Ananus b. Ananus was succeeded in the high priesthood by Elioneus b. Cantheras
c. 37–40 CE	Elioneus b. Cantheras (called Cantherus) (אליהו עיני בן הקף, מבית קתרוס)	During the first eight years of Claudius Caesar's reign, there were 3 Jewish high priests: Cantheras, Joseph Camydus and Ananias b. Nebedeus. Elioneus, called Cantherus, was appointed high priest by King Agrippa I	Elioneus, called Cantherus, was succeeded in the high priesthood by Joseph b. Camus
c. 40–43 CE	Joseph b. Camus (Camydus) (יוסף בן קומודיוס)	During the first eight years of Claudius Caesar's reign, there were 3 Jewish high priests: Cantheras, Joseph Camydus and Ananias b. Nebedeus. Joseph b. Camus was appointed high priest by Herod of Chalcis after the death of Agrippa I.	Joseph b. Camus was succeeded in the high priesthood by Ananias b. Nebedeus
c. 43–45 CE	Ananias b. Nebedeus (חנניה בן נבדאי)	During the first eight years of Claudius Caesar's reign, there were 3 Jewish high priests: Cantheras, Joseph Camydus and Ananias b. Nebedeus. Ananias b. Nebedeus was appointed high priest by Herod of Chalcis	Ananias b. Nebedeus was succeeded in the high priesthood by Ismael b. Phabi. Ananias, although no longer officiating as high priest, was killed in the internecine strife raging in Jerusalem in the month Gorpieus (lunar month Elul), in the year 64 CE.
c. 45–46 CE	Ismael b. Phabi (ישמעאל בן פיאבי)	Presumed to have been appointed high priest by King Agrippa II	Ismael b. Phabi the high priest was detained in Rome by Nero, and replaced with Joseph b. Simon
c. 46–49 CE	Joseph (called Cabi) b. Simon (יוסף בן שמעון הנקרא קיאבי)	Appointed high priest by King Agrippa II, after having earlier served as high priest	Removed from office by King Agrippa, who then appointed Ananus b. Ananus in his stead
c. 49 CE	Ananus b. Ananus (חנן בן חנן)	Appointed high priest by King Agrippa II, but held the office for only 3 months. Ananus belonged to the sect of the Sadducees.	Removed from office by King Agrippa II, and the office given to Jesus b. Damneus
c. 49–55 CE	Jesus b. Damneus (ישוע בן דמנאי)	Appointed high priest by King Agrippa II, during the tenure of Albinus the procurator	Removed from office by King Agrippa II, and was eventually replaced by Jesus b. Gamla.
c. 55–62 CE	Jesus b. (Gamliel) [Gamla] (יהושע בן גמלה)	Made high priest by King Agrippa II during the reign of Claudius Caesar. He is mentioned in Mishnah Yoma 3:9 and Yebamot 6:4.	Removed from office by King Agrippa II, and replaced by Matthias b. Theophilus. Eventually, Jesus b. Gamla is murdered by the Idumeans under Simon bar Giora.
c. 62–66 CE	Matthias b. Theophilus (מתתיה בן תפלוס)	Matthias was already the High Priest when the war with the Romans broke out, in the 12th year of Nero’s reign	Matthias was killed by Simon bar Giora for being suspected of siding with the Romans during the First Jewish-Roman war, and his office given to Phannius b. Samuel after casting lots for his replacement.
c. 66–70 CE	Phannias ben Samuel (פני בן שמואל)	Phannias was made the last high priest of Israel, in the midst of the internecine strife in Judea. The office of high priest was conferred upon him after casting lots to select a new high priest. Being unqualified for the task, he was given instructions as to how to perform his sacerdotal duties.	With the destruction of the Second Temple, the function of the high priest's office was dissolved.

Josephus's timeline of high priests during the Second Temple period may have well been within a 420-year span of the Second Temple's existence (according to Seder Olam), although the same timeline given by Josephus does not strain credulity if it had spanned a 639-year period.

=== Disparities between Josephus and the Hebrew Scriptures ===
While in the vast majority of instances, Josephus's figures coincide with those of the Hebrew Bible, Josephus's figures given for certain events during the First Temple period often stand in direct contradiction to the figures given for the same event in the Hebrew Scriptures. For example, where the Hebrew Bible (I Kings 6:1) assigns 480 years from the exodus to the building of the First Temple, Josephus wrote (Antiquities 8.3.1.) that it was built 592 years after the exodus. Where the Hebrew Bible (I Kings 11:42) assigns Solomon's reign as 40 years, Josephus (Antiquities 8.7.8.) puts his reign at 80 years. Josephus also grossly erred in writing that a span of 514 years transpired from the time of the first and last kings of David's dynasty (being 21 kings altogether). The biblical accounts for this same period puts it at about 474 years. Whether they are copyist errors or not, such disparities cast a dark shadow on the reliability of Josephus's chronological timetable, since, in his own words, one of his expressed intentions was to convey the history of the Hebrews unto the Greeks, just as they are laid-up in the sacred writings. Many of Josephus's figures differ from those of Seder Olam, a chronography dating back to the 2nd century CE and where timeframes are more closely aligned to those of the Hebrew Bible, and largely accepted by the vast majority in Israel.

== The year 68 CE as a focal point of reference ==
By counting in retrospect the regnal years of Caesars from this fixed point in time (68 CE), being, according to Jewish tradition, the year of the Second Temple's destruction and which came to its demise in the 2nd year of the reign of Vespasian, one is able to chart out and chronograph a rich past that might vary, in some respects, from the conventional views of modern-day chroniclers, as Josephus provides the avid scholar of history with a schematic chronology of the entire Second Temple period, with its successive chain of High Priests serving under the various rulers, with their respective tenures in office, as well as accompanied, occasionally, by dates inscribed in one of two epochs, the Seleucid era and the Olympiad era.

== See also ==
- List of High Priests of Israel
- Missing years (Jewish calendar)
- Chronology of the Bible
- Timeline of Jewish history

== Bibliography ==
- Ben Halpetha, Jose (1971). M.D. Yerushalmi (ed.). Seder Olam Rabba (in Hebrew). Gil Publishers, in affiliation with the Haredi Youth Organization. OCLC 233090728. (reprint of 1955 edition, Jerusalem)
- Bickerman, E.J. (1980). Chronology of the Ancient World. London: Thames and Hudson. ISBN 9780500400395.
- Cassius Dio (1969). E.H. Warmington (ed.). Dio's Roman History. The Loeb Classical Library (in English and Greek). Vol. 3. Cambridge: Harvard University Press. OCLC 264964964.
- Cory, I.P. (1828). The Ancient Fragments. London: William Pickering. OCLC 1000992106.
- Danby, H., ed. (1977), The Mishnah, Oxford: Oxford University Press, ISBN 0-19-815402-X
- Englander, Henry (1919). "Problems of Chronology in the Persian Period of Jewish History". Journal of Jewish Lore and Philosophy. 1 (1). Hebrew Union College Press: 83–103. JSTOR 42956621.
- Feeney, D. (2007). Caesar's Calendar: Ancient Time and the Beginnings of History. Berkely: University of California Press. ISBN 9780520251199.
- First, Mitchell (1997). Jewish History in Conflict: A Study of the Major Discrepancy between Rabbinic and Conventional Chronology. Lanham: Jason Aronson. ISBN 978-1-56821-970-7. OCLC 845250409.
- Hadad, David (2005). Sefer Maʻaśe avot (in Hebrew) (4 ed.). Beer Sheba: Kodesh Books. OCLC 74311775. (with endorsements by Rabbi Ovadia Yosef, Rabbi Shlomo Amar, and Rabbi Yona Metzger)
- Horsley, R.A. (1986). "High Priests and the Politics of Roman Palestine: A Contextual Analysis of the Evidence in Josephus". Journal for the Study of Judaism in the Persian, Hellenistic, and Roman Period. 17 (1). Brill: 23–55. doi:10.1163/157006386X00040. JSTOR 24657973.
- Hughes, Jeremy (1990). Secrets of the Times: Myth and History in Biblical Chronology. A&C Black. ISBN 978-0567629302.
- Josephus (1980) [First published 1959]. The Jewish War. Penguin Classics. Translated by Williamson, G.A. (Revised ed.). Penguin Books. OCLC 1239783869.
- MacNaughton, D. (1930). A Scheme of Babylonian Chronology. From the Flood to the Fall of Nineveh. London: Luzac & Co. OCLC 1071108995.
- Maimonides (1974). Sefer Mishneh Torah - HaYad Ha-Chazakah (Maimonides' Code of Jewish Law) (in Hebrew). Vol. 4. Jerusalem: Pe'er HaTorah. OCLC 122758200., Hil. Shmita ve-yovel 10:2–4
- Maimonides (1989). Jehoshua Blau (ed.). R. Moses b. Maimon Responsa (in Hebrew). Vol. 2. Jerusalem: Meḳitse nirdamim / Rubin Mass Ltd. OCLC 78411726., responsum no. 389
- Milikowski, Chaim (2011). "Seder Olam". In Berlin, Adele (ed.). The Oxford Dictionary of the Jewish Religion. Oxford University Press. ISBN 978-0199730049.
- Mitchell, Hinckley G. (1903). "The Wall of Jerusalem According to the Book of Nehemiah". Journal of Bible Literature. 22 (2): 85–163. doi:10.2307/3259194. JSTOR 3259194.
- Nathan ben Abraham (1955), "Perush Shishah Sidrei Mishnah - A Commentary on the Six Orders of the Mishnah", in Sachs, Mordecai Yehudah Leib (ed.), The Six Orders of the Mishnah: with the Commentaries of the Rishonim (in Hebrew), vol. 1, Jerusalem: El ha-Meqorot, OCLC 233403923
- Parker, R.A.; Dubberstein, Waldo H. (1956). Babylonian Chronology, 626 B.C.–A.D. 75. Providence: Brown University Press. OCLC 460027103.
- Saadia Gaon (1981). Yosef Qafih (ed.). Daniel and the Scroll of Antiochus, with a commentary by Rabbi Saadia Gaon (Daniʼel ʻim targum u-ferush Saʻadyah ben Yosef Fayumi) (in Hebrew). Jerusalem: Committee for the Publication of Saadia's Works. OCLC 214650444.
- Sar-Shalom, Rahamim (1984). She'harim La'Luah Ha'ivry (Gates to the Hebrew Calendar) (in Hebrew). Tel-Aviv. OCLC 854906532.
- Schwartz, D.R. (1990). "On Some Papyri and Josephus' Sources and Chronology for the Persian Period". Journal for the Study of Judaism in the Persian, Hellenistic, and Roman Period. 21 (2). Brill: 175–199. doi:10.1163/157006390X00270. JSTOR 24660088.
- Solomon, Norman (2006). Historical Dictionary of Judaism (2 ed.). Scarecrow Press. ISBN 978-0810864986.
- Stern, Sacha (2001). Calendar and Community: A History of the Jewish Calendar Second Century BCE–Tenth Century CE. Oxford: Oxford University Press.
- Wacholder, Ben Zion (1968). "Biblical Chronology in the Hellenistic World Chronicles". The Harvard Theological Review. 61 (3). Cambridge University Press, on behalf of the Harvard Divinity School: 451–481. doi:10.1017/S0017816000029278. JSTOR 1509158. S2CID 162537095.
