= Isaac Preston =

Isaac Preston may refer to:

- Isaac Trimble Preston (1793–1852), American lawyer, judge, and politician from Louisiana
- Isaac Mosher Preston (1813–1880), American lawyer, judge, and politician from Iowa
- Isaac Preston Cory (1802–1842), British antiquarian
