= Duncan MacNaughton =

Scottish lawyer and astronomer

Duncan MacNaughton WS FRSE (2 March 1892 – 1 October 1973) was a 20th-century Scottish lawyer and astronomer and archaeologist. Also disguising a secret parallel love of astrology, he wrote under the name of Maurice Wemyss on astrological matters.

== Life ==
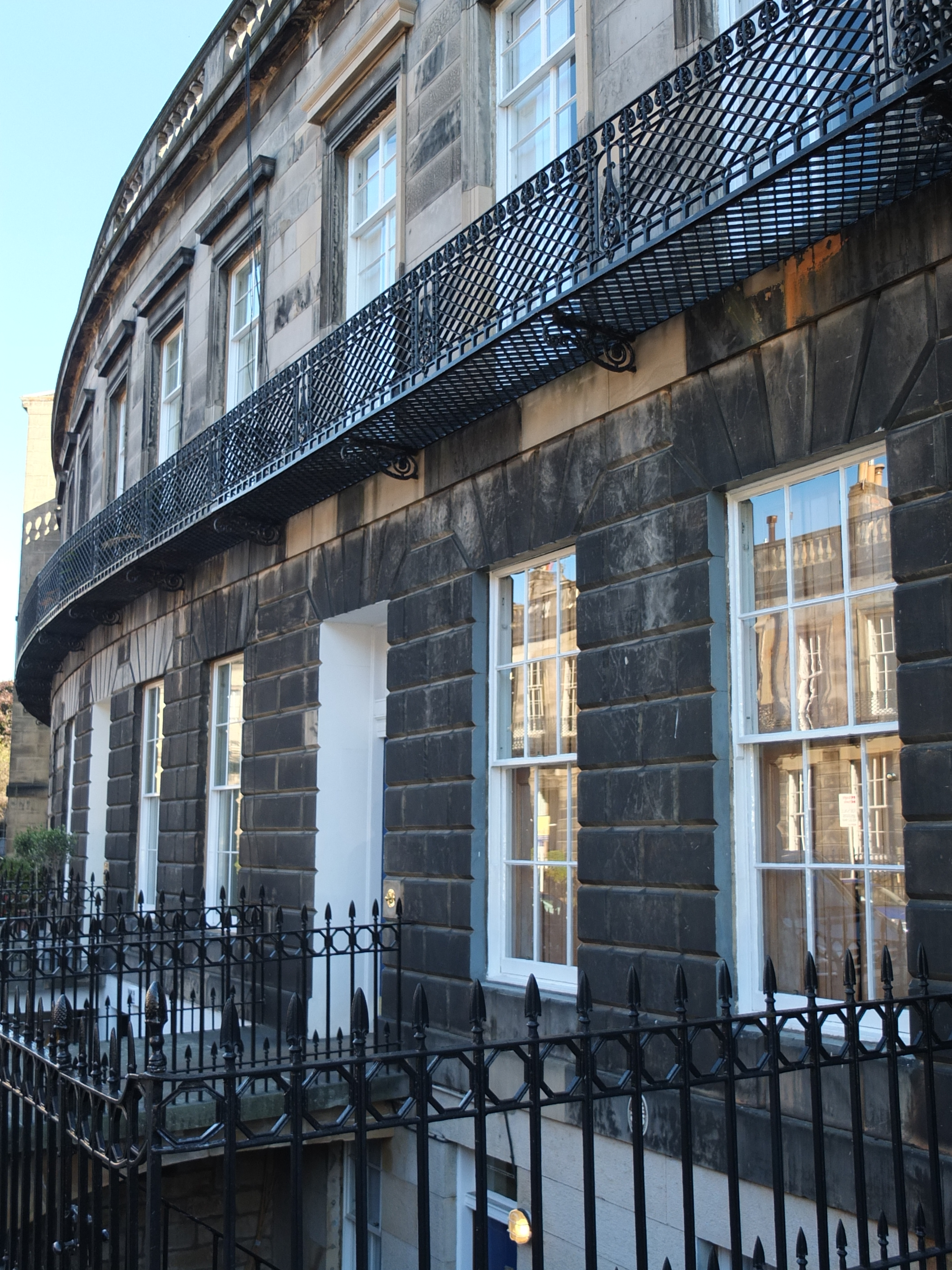
3 Danube Street, Edinburgh

He was born on 2 March 1892 the son of Peter MacNaughton, a solicitor in the Supreme Courts. The family lived at 3 Danube Street in Stockbridge, Edinburgh. He was privately educated at Edinburgh Academy 1900–1910. He then studied law at the University of Edinburgh graduating with an MA around 1913. He was apprenticed as a lawyer to Thomas Hunter (later Sir Thomas Hunter) Notary Public at 29 Dundas Street.

In the First World War he enlisted as a private in the 9th battalion Royal Scots. He was wounded in 1915. He then received a commission and served as a 2nd Lieutenant in the Gordon Highlanders.

He qualified as a Writer to the Signet in 1919 and joined the famous Edinburgh firm of JS and JW Fraser Tytler, descended from Patrick Fraser Tytler, and based at 22 Young Street in Edinburgh's New Town.

In 1943, he was elected a Fellow of the Royal Society of Edinburgh. His proposers were George James Lidstone, William Michael Herbert Greaves, Sir William Wright Smith, and James Watt.

He died in Edinburgh on 1 October 1973.

== Publications ==
As Duncan MacNaughton:

- A Scheme of Babylonian Chronology
- A Scheme of Egyptian Chronology

As Maurice Wemyss:

- The Wheel of Life: or Scientific Astrology (1920)
- More Notable Nativities and Famous Nativities (1943)
