= Cory's Ancient Fragments =

Compendium of literary fragments

Cory's Ancient Fragments is compendium of literary fragments of texts by ancient writers, collected and published by the British antiquarian and miscellaneous writer Isaac Preston Cory (1802–1842). The first edition was published in 1826, further followed by a revised edition containing various ancient king-lists (e.g. those recorded by the early Ptolemaic-era priest and historian Manetho). A further enlarged edition appeared in 1876, edited by historian E. Richmond Hodges, which added many more ancient fragments.

== Fragments (1826, 1832 ed.) ==
=== Phoenician ===
Sanchuniathon

=== Babylonian ===
Berossus, Abydenus, Nicolaus of Damascus, Alexander Polyhistor, Eupolemus, Thallus,
Ctesias, Diodorus Siculus, Castor of Rhodes, Herodotus, Marcus Velleius Paterculus

=== Egyptian ===
Manetho, Artapanus, Diodorus Siculus, Chaeremon of Alexandria

Manetho copied down from the ancient Egyptian inscriptions a list of eight successive Persian kings, beginning with Cambyses, the son of Cyrus the Great, at the request of Ptolemy Philadelphus (266 BCE – 228 BCE).

Cambyses (Artaxerxes) b. Cyrus = reigned over Persia, his own kingdom, for 5 years, and over Egypt for 6 years.
Darius (II), the son of Hystaspes = reigned 36 years.
Xerxes (Artaxerxes), the Great, b. Darius = reigned 21 years.
Artabanus = reigned 7 months.
Artaxerxes (Cyrus) b. Xerxes the Great = reigned 41 years.
Xerxes = reigned 2 months.
Sogdianus = reigned 7 months.
Darius (III), the son of Xerxes = reigned 19 years.

Between Cambyses' reign and Darius, the son of Hystaspes, there was an interim period whereby the Magi ruled over Persia. This important anecdote is supplied by Herodotus who wrote the Magian ruled Persia for 7 months after the death of Cambyses. Josephus, on the other hand, says they obtained the government of the Persians for a year.

=== Tyrian ===
Menander of Ephesus

=== Indian ===
Megasthenes, Cleitarchus

=== Carthaginian ===
Hanno the Navigator

== Fragments (1876 ed.) ==
Hodges added more ancient fragments including a section of "miscellaneous fragments" of ancient writers (e.g. Sallust, Agatharchides). However, Hodge removed Cory's original fragments from neoplatonists, which he considered to be forgeries.
