= Isaac Preston Cory =

British antiquarian (1802–1842)

- Born: 1802
- Died: 1 April 1842 (aged 39–40); Blundeston, Suffolk
- Education: Caius College, Cambridge
- Occupation: Antiquarian
- Known for: The compendium: Cory's Ancient Fragments

Isaac Preston Cory (1802–1842) was a British antiquarian who compiled ancient fragments and published them in a compendium called Cory's Ancient Fragments (1826, revised 1832).

== Career ==
Cory was a Fellow of Caius College, having obtained a master's degree in law in 1827. He soon after became a professional barrister, but also was an antiquarian and book collector. He was a personal friend of Thomas Taylor and through him obtained ancient fragments from classical neoplatonists which he added to his compendium of ancient fragments.

He died in Blundeston in 1842.

== Works ==
- Cory's Ancient Fragments (1826; revised 1832)
- Metaphysical inquiry into method, objects, and result of ancient and modern philosophy (1833)
- Chronological inquiry into the ancient history of Egypt (1837)
- Mythological inquiry into the recondite theology of the heathens (1837)
- A practical treatise on accounts, exhibiting a view of the discrepancies between the practice of the law and of merchants (1939)
