= Ramaz =

Ramaz may refer to:

- Moses ben Mordecai Zacuto, 17th century kabbalist
- Moses S. Margolies (1851–1936), rabbi and namesake of the Ramaz School
- Ramaz School, New York (Upper East Side), Jewish prep school
- Ramaz Shengelia (1957–2012), Soviet footballer
