= Norman Salit =

American lawyer, rabbi, and Zionist

- Born: June 8, 1896; Brooklyn, New York
- Died: July 21, 1960 (age 64); New York City
- Education: B.A. from City College; J.D. New York University; M.A. Columbia University; M.A. Jewish Theological Seminary
- Occupations: Rabbi, attorney
- Spouse: Ruth Levy
- Children: 2
- Relatives: Lisa Birnbach (granddaughter)

Norman Salit (June 8, 1896 – July 21, 1960) was an American lawyer, rabbi, and Zionist who served as the president of the Synagogue Council of America.

== Biography ==
Salit was born to a Jewish family on June 8, 1896, in Brooklyn, New York, the son of Rachel Ethel (née Altschul) and Michael Salit. In 1916, he graduated with a B.A. from City College; in 1919, he graduated with a J.D. from New York University; in 1920, he received his rabbinic ordination from the Jewish Theological Seminary of America; and in 1922, he graduated with a M.A. from Columbia University. From 1919 to 1924, he served as the rabbi at Temple Adath Israel in the Bronx and from 1924 to 1929 as the rabbi at Congregation Shaaray Tefila in Far Rockaway, Queens. From 1933 to 1937, he was head of the Queens County Bar Association Committee on Legislation and Law Reform. In addition to being admitted to practice law in New York, in 1938 he was admitted to the bars of the U.S. Supreme Court and the U.S. Treasury Department. During World War II he was the executive director of the Wartime Emergency Commission for Conservative Judaism. In 1949, he received a Master of Hebrew Letters from the Jewish Theological Seminary and in 1956, an honorary Doctor of Letters from the same institution. From 1953 to 1955, he served as president of the Synagogue Council of America. In 1957, he received a Doctor of Humane Letters from the Philathea College in Canada. He later served on the board of overseers of the Jewish Theological Seminary of America, as president of the Long Island Council of the American Jewish Congress, on the executive council of the New York Board of Rabbis (1951-1958), as counsel for the Rabbinical Assembly of America, and as a member of the executive committee of the Zionist Organization of America.

== Personal life ==
In 1928, Salit married Ruth Levy; they had two children, Naomi Salit and Miriam Salit. He died on July 21, 1960, in New York City. His granddaughter is author Lisa Birnbach (married to film producer Steven Haft).
