= Reproof =

Reproof may refer to:

- Reproof (firearms), a test of a gun after its original proof
- Reproof, a form of congregational discipline among Jehovah's Witnesses
- Reproof, a less severe censure than a rebuke in English civil and church law
- "Reproof", a song on the EP HalfNoise by HalfNoise
- The Reproof, a painting by Emily Sartain

== See also ==
- Reprimand, a severe, formal or official reproof
- Tocheichah (meaning admonition or reproof), the section in chapter 26 of Leviticus
