= Glenn Cohen =

Glenn or Glen Cohen may refer to:

- Glen Cohen (born 1954), Jamaican-born British runner
- Glenn Cohen (psychologist) (born 1964), Israeli-American psychologist
- I. Glenn Cohen (born 1978), Canadian academic

== See also ==
- Cohen (surname)
