= Joseph Lookstein =

Russian-born American rabbi

Rabbi Joseph Lookstein
- יוסף לוקשטיין
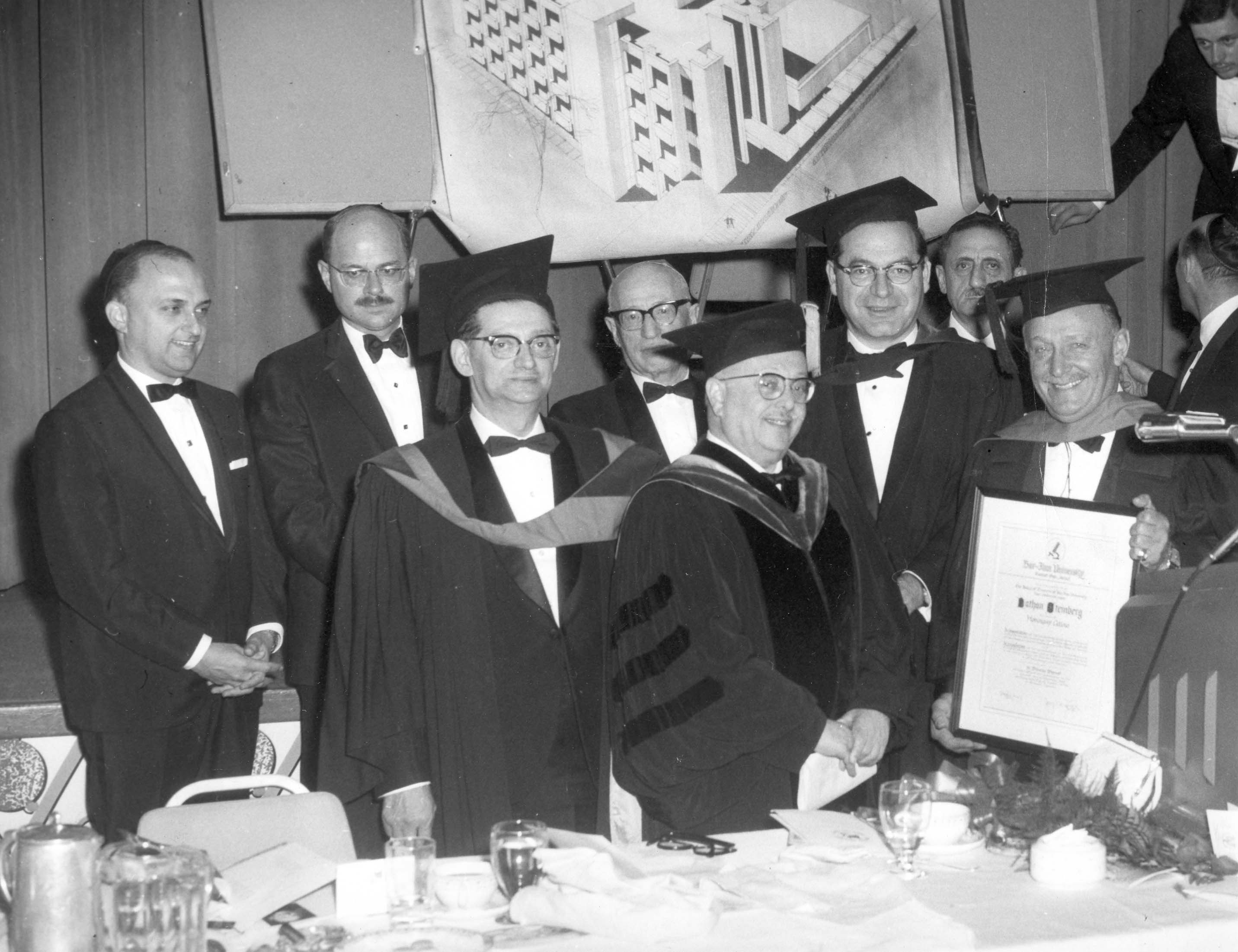
- Joseph Lookstein, in the middle with stripes on his sleeve.

Personal life
- Born: December 25, 1902 Mogilev, Russian Empire
- Died: July 13, 1979 (aged 76) Miami Beach, Florida
- Spouse: Gertrude Schlang
- Children: Two (Haskel Lookstein, Nathalie Friedman)
- Education: City College of New York; Columbia University; Rabbi Isaac Elchanan Theological Seminary at Yeshiva University

Religious life
- Religion: Judaism
- Denomination: Orthodox Judaism

Jewish leader
- Predecessor: Moses S. Margolies
- Successor: Haskel Lookstein
- Synagogue: Congregation Kehilath Jeshurun
- Position: Senior Rabbi
- Began: 1933
- Ended: 1979
- Other: President, Rabbinical Council of America; President, Synagogue Council of America (1979); President, New York Board of Rabbis; President, Bar-Ilan University (1957 – 1967); Founding Principal, Ramaz School (1937 – 1966)
- Semikhah: 1926 (RIETS)

Joseph Hyman Lookstein (Hebrew: יוסף לוקשטיין; December 25, 1902 – July 13, 1979) was a Russian-born American rabbi who served as spiritual leader of Congregation Kehilath Jeshurun on the Upper East Side of Manhattan and was a leader in Orthodox Judaism, including his service as president of the Rabbinical Council of America and of the cross-denominational Synagogue Council of America and New York Board of Rabbis. He was President of Bar-Ilan University from 1957 to 1967.

== Biography ==
Lookstein was born in Mogilev, Belarus, then in the Russian Empire. He emigrated to the United States in 1908, attended City College of New York and did graduate work at Columbia University. He received his Jewish education at Rabbi Jacob Joseph School and received his rabbinic ordination in 1926 from the Rabbi Isaac Elchanan Theological Seminary at Yeshiva University. He had already served as a rabbi in Brooklyn, and then assistant rabbi for three years at Congregation Kehilath Jeshurun, under Rabbi Moses S. Margolies, grandfather of his future wife. Lookstein continued in that role after receiving his ordination, assuming the title of senior rabbi after Margolies's death in 1936.

In 1930, he established the Hebrew Teachers Training School for Girls, now part of Yeshiva University, and served as its principal for ten years.

He was the chief military chaplain of the United States, holding the ceremonial rank of Brigadier General, in the period after World War II.

Shortly after the establishment of Bar-Ilan University in Ramat Gan, Israel, Rabbi Lookstein became the institution's acting president in 1957 for nine years, succeeding Pinkhos Churgin, before being succeeded by Max Jammer and named as the school's chancellor in 1966. During his tenure, the school grew from a single building with 40 students into a school with an enrollment of thousands.

He was elected as head of the Synagogue Council of America in 1979, was a past president of the Rabbinical Council of America and the New York Board of Rabbis.

He founded the Ramaz School in 1937, which was named in honor of his grandfather-in-law. Lookstein's son, Rabbi Haskel Lookstein, was a member of the school's inaugural first grade class. By the time of his death, the school had an enrollment of 800 students.

== Personal life ==
He married Gertrude Schlang (1907-1997) in 1926. They met when she was 16, and married two years later, after his ordination. The marriage lasted 53 years, until his death. Gerdie's mother was Etta (Margolies) Schlang, the daughter of Rabbi Moses Margolies, his predecessor as Kehilath Jeshurun, and his mentor when he first arrived at the synagogue.

Gertrude and Joseph Lookstein had two children, Rabbi Haskel Lookstein, who succeeded Joseph as rabbi at his synagogue, and Dr. Nathalie Friedman. They had eight grandchildren, four each from their two children.

He suffered a stroke in 1979, and died about two weeks later, age 76 on July 13, at Mount Sinai Hospital in Miami Beach, Florida. His son, Haskel Lookstein, had served as the Assistant Rabbi at Congregation Kehillath Jeshurun starting in 1958, and assumed the title of Senior Rabbi upon his father's death.
