= Lisa Birnbach =

American author

Lisa Regine Birnbach
- Born: 1957 or 1958 (age 67–68); New York City, New York, U.S.
- Education: Columbia University; Brown University (BA)
- Spouse: Steven Haft (divorced)
- Children: 3
- Relatives: Norman Salit (grandfather)

Lisa R. Birnbach (born 1957/1958) is an author best known for co-authoring The Official Preppy Handbook, which spent 38 weeks at number one on the New York Times best-seller list in 1980.

== Early life and education ==
Birnbach was born to a Jewish family on the Upper East Side of New York, the daughter of Naomi (née Salit) and Maks Birnbach. Her father immigrated from Germany to Mandatory Palestine prior to World War II where he was a member of the Irgun and then later immigrated to the United States where he worked as a diamond importer; her mother worked for the Jewish Museum. Her maternal grandfather, Norman Salit, was a rabbi and served as president of the Synagogue Council of America.

Birnbach attended the Birch Wathen Lenox School from 1962 to 1971 and the Riverdale Country School (class of 1974). She went on to study at Barnard College of Columbia University for her first year, before transferring to Brown University where she graduated with a Bachelor of Arts degree with Honors in Semiotics in 1978.

== Career ==
After graduation, Birnbach toured Europe and worked for an advertising agency. From April 1979, Birnbach worked as a staff writer at The Village Voice, where she co-wrote the Scenes column. Since The Official Preppy Handbook Lisa has written an additional 15 books, for newspapers such as the New York Times, and for magazines such as Glamour, Parade, Rolling Stone, and TV Guide. She was the deputy editor of Spy magazine.

Birnbach worked as a technical consultant on the movie Dead Poets Society. She has co–hosted Good Night America and was a correspondent on The Early Show, hosting the segment, "Yikes! I'm a Grownup!" She is co–creator and co–host of ABC's Zero Hour, co–writer of the off–Broadway revue, Loose Lips, and until 2007, she hosted the comedy radio program, The Lisa Birnbach Show.

In 2010, she wrote True Prep: It’s a Whole New Old World with Chip Kidd. She appeared on the Colbert Report on 13 September 2010.

In 2022, Lisa Birnbach appeared in the Netflix docu-series The Andy Warhol Diaries, in which she retroactively criticized The Official Preppy Handbook for passages encouraging gender discrimination and homophobia. In her interview in the series, Birnbach noted that two of the contributors to the book were gay men.

== Personal life ==
Birnbach resides in Manhattan. She was married to film producer Steven Haft known for the production of Jakob the Liar and Dead Poets Society. Haft and Birnbach have since divorced.

Birnbach was contacted by E. Jean Carroll about an alleged act of violent sexual assault by U.S. President Donald Trump, and suggested pressing charges. On political grounds, Birnbach also criticized President Trump and his political allies such as Mark Meadows and William Barr on her official social media.

== Authored books ==
- Lisa Birnbach (October 1980), The Official Preppy Handbook, New York: Workman Publishing Company, OCLC 681897418, OL 15163107W, Wikidata Q7754751
- Lisa Birnbach's College Book. New York: Ballantine Books. 1984. ISBN 9780345309181.
- Going to Work. New York: Villard. 1988. ISBN 9780394758749.
- Kurt Andersen; Lisa Birnbach; Jamie Malanowski (1995). Loose lips : real words, real people, real funny. New York: Simon & Schuster. ISBN 9780684803401.
- 1,003 Great Things About Getting Older. New York: MJF Books. 1997. ISBN 9781567313581.
- Lisa Birnbach; Ann Hodgman; Patricia Marx (1998). 1,003 Great Things About Kids. Kansas City, Mo.: Andrews McMeel Pub. ISBN 9780836269642.
- 1,003 Great Things About Friends. New York: MJF Books. 1999. ISBN 978-1567313949.
- Barbie Live. New York: Rizzoli. 2000. ISBN 978-0789304872.
- 1,003 Great Things About Teachers. New York: MJF Books. 2002. ISBN 978-1567315073.
- Lisa Birnbach; Ann Hodgman; Patricia Marx (2002). 1,003 Great Things About America. Kansas City, Mo.: Andrews McMeel Pub. ISBN 9780740729492.
- Lisa Birnbach; Ann Hodgman; Patricia Marx (2003). 1,003 Great Things About Moms. New York: MJF Books. ISBN 978-1567315899.
- Lisa Birnbach; Ann Hodgman; Patricia Marx (2005). 1,003 Great Things About Being a Woman. Kansas City, Mo.: Andrews McMeel Pub. ISBN 9780740750137.
- Lisa Birnbach; Ann Hodgman; Patricia Marx (2005). 1,003 Great Things to Smile About. Kansas City, Mo.: Andrews McMeel Pub. ISBN 9780740741647.
- 1,003 Great Things About Being Jewish. Kansas City: Andrews McMeel Pub. 2006. ISBN 9780740755293.
- Lisa Birnbach; Ann Hodgman; Patricia Marx (2009). 40% off is the new black : reasons why less is more. Kansas City, Mo.: Andrews McMeel Pub. ISBN 9780740785313.
- Lisa Birnbach; Chip Kidd (2011). True Prep: It's a Whole New Old World. New York: Knopf. ISBN 978-0375712012.
