= Congregation Kehilath Jeshurun =

Synagogue in Manhattan, New York

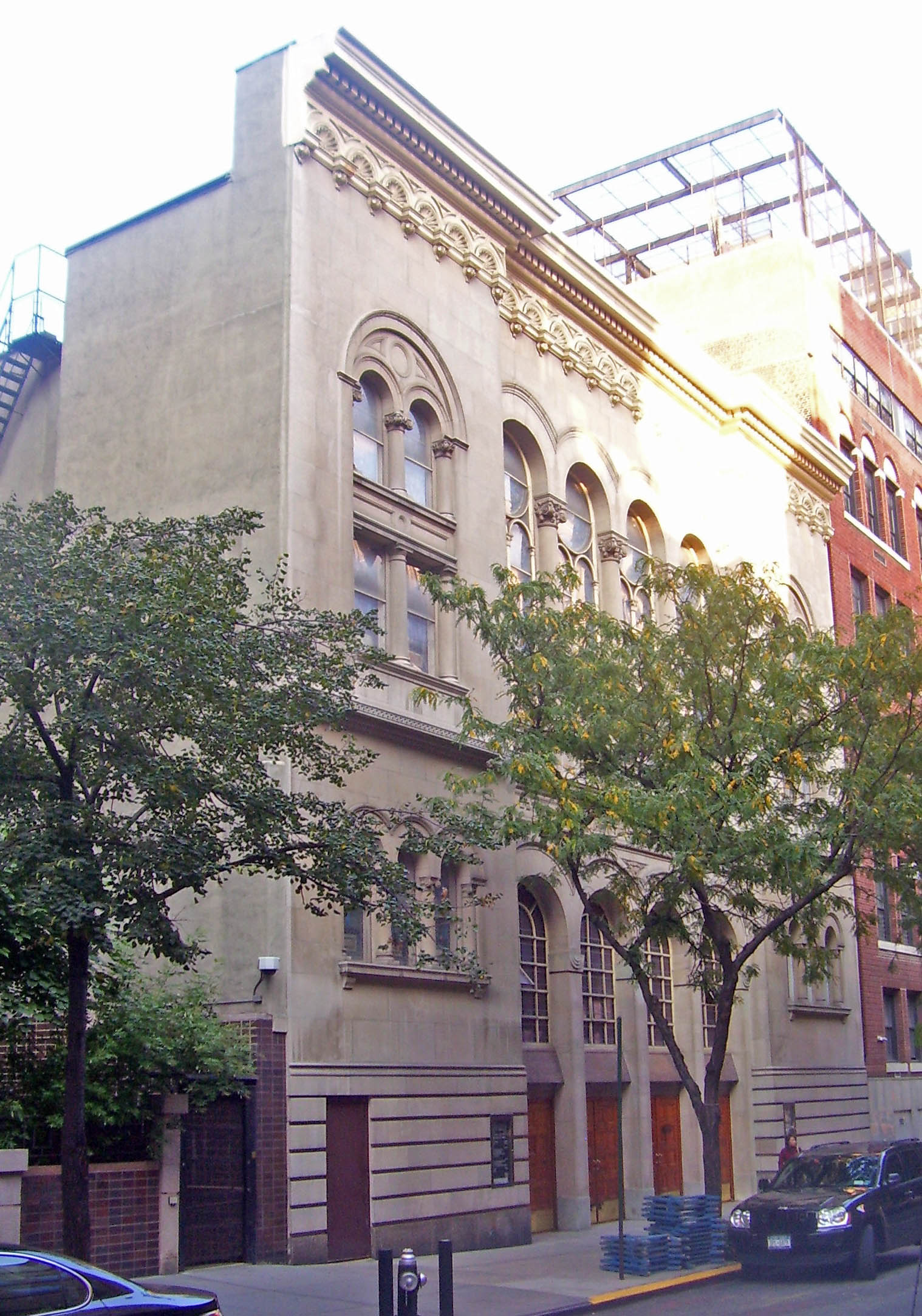
- The façade of Kehilath Jeshurun synagogue, in 2008, before the 2011 fire

- Location in Manhattan

Religion
- Affiliation: Modern Orthodox Judaism
- Ecclesiastical or organisational status: Synagogue
- Leadership: Rabbi Chaim Steinmetz; Rabbi Roy Feldman (Associate Rabbi); Rabbi Meyer Laniado (Associate Rabbi); Rabbi Haskel Lookstein (Emeritus); Cantor Chaim David Berson (Cantor)
- Status: Active

Location
- Location: 126 East 85th Street, Upper East Side, New York, New York 10028
- Country: United States
- Coordinates: 40°46′45″N 73°57′24″W

Architecture
- Type: Synagogue
- Style: Neo-classical
- Established: 1872 (as a congregation)
- Completed: 1872

Specifications
- Interior area: 18,000 square feet (1,700 m^{2}) (Sanctuary only)
- Materials: Limestone
- Elevation: 80 ft (24 m)

Website
- ckj.org

Congregation Kehilath Jeshurun (abbreviated as KJ or CKJ) is a Modern Orthodox Jewish synagogue at 126 East 85th Street on the Upper East Side of Manhattan in New York City, New York, United States. The synagogue was founded in 1872. The synagogue is closely affiliated with the Ramaz School. The lower school is co-located in an adjacent building and is across the street from the middle school.

== History ==
The synagogue was founded in 1872 and was originally known as Anshe Jeshurun. The congregation built a neoclassical, Romanesque synagogue building in 1902.

Rabbi Moses Zevulun Margolies served as the synagogue's Rabbi from 1906 until his death in 1936. He was hired around the same time as Mordecai Kaplan, and they served to counterbalance each other, Margolies's Yiddish and tradition against Kaplan's English sermonizing and other changes.

The Ramaz school name derives from Margolies' initials. He was the grandfather-in-law of the school's founder, Rabbi Joseph H. Lookstein, who succeeded Margolies as the synagogue's Senior Rabbi.

Lookstein had served as the congregation's assistant Rabbi after receiving his semicha in 1926 from the Rabbi Isaac Elchanan Theological Seminary at Yeshiva University and had assumed many congregational leader roles in the years before his grandfather's death, when Margolies had a prolonged illness. Lookstein assumed the title of Senior Rabbi after his grandfather died in 1936.

Rabbi Haskel Lookstein, son of Joseph Lookstein, was installed as an assistant rabbi on June 14, 1958, serving under his father, and became Senior Rabbi after his father died in 1979. The younger Lookstein was a member of the first class of six students at Ramaz when the school was established in 1937.

Rabbi Elie Weinstock is another leader of the congregation.

In December 2008, it was reported that the congregation lost $3.5 million in the Bernard Madoff scandal.

Rabbi Chaim Steinmetz was appointed senior rabbi from January 1, 2016, and Rabbi Haskel Lookstein assumed the role of Rabbi Emeritus, Rabbi Elie Weinstock was granted the title of "Rabbi", and Rabbi Roy Feldman remained as Assistant Rabbi.

=== 2011 fire and subsequent rebuild ===
A fire in July 2011, whilst the synagogue was undergoing minor renovations, resulted in significant damage to the building's interior and the congregation temporarily relocated to the 92nd Street Y. Nearly half of the sanctuary's forty stained glass windows were destroyed by the fire and had to be recreated using historical and forensic analysis. The subsequent reconstruction enabled the restoration of the synagogue and construction of a new two-story, 8,000-square-foot (740 m^{2}) education and fitness wing for the school, above the synagogue. The two new floors cut across the school and the synagogue horizontally, facilitating improved connectivity between the school and the synagogue. Other improvements included a central entry and single security point for both institutions, an expanded lobby, an enlarged cafeteria and commercial kitchen, a new chapel and scholar's library, and an expanded rooftop play terrace. The $21 million redevelopment won a Building Design+Construction 2016 Gold Award Winner in the Reconstruction category. The transformation of the Lower School's gymnasium into a chapel won a 2018 award from the American Institute of Architects.

== Synagogue Archives ==
The synagogue had maintained an extensive archives, which was donated to Yeshiva University shortly before the fire. Nearly 1,500 synagogue bulletins, from 1925 through 1992, have been digitized and are freely available at Yeshiva University's Digital Collections portal.

== Prominent members ==
The Congregation is known for members who are prominent businessmen and philanthropists, including Harry Fischel, George Rohr, film producer Steven Haft, author Lisa Birnbach, the New York real estate Kushner family (patriarch Joseph Kushner and his sons Murray Kushner and Charles Kushner) and Ivanka Trump, who converted to Judaism before she married Jared Kushner.

As reggae singer Matisyahu was becoming more a religious Jew, he began to attend services at the synagogue in 2004.

== See also ==
- List of investors in Bernard L. Madoff Securities
