= Stanley Cohen (attorney) =

American attorney and political activist

- Born: 1950 (age 75–76)
- Education: Long Island University
- Occupations: Attorney; political activist
- Known for: Political activism
- Website: http://istanleycohen.org/

Stanley Cohen (born 1950) is an American attorney and political activist. Born into an Orthodox Jewish family, he describes himself as "an advocate for many people the government would like to silence or put in jail."

He has represented members of Hamas and Hezbollah, as well as a relative of Osama Bin Laden, and detainees at Guantanamo Bay. In 2014 he pleaded guilty to tax charges and was sentenced to 18 months in prison, resulting in suspension of his law license.

Cohen said, in 2023, he has maintained contact with Hamas leaders on legal matters. He described Ismail Haniyeh as "warm, loving, and principled."

He has written a series of opinion pieces for Al Jazeera English.

== Early life and career ==
Cohen was born in 1950 and grew up in Port Chester (New York) between Greenwich, Conn., and Rye (N.Y.) He was raised by Orthodox Jewish parents and attended Hebrew schools. He ceased practicing Judaism at 14.

When he was still a law student at Long Island University, he teamed with attorney Lynne Stewart to represent Kathy Boudin, member of Weather Underground and May 19th Communist Organization who was accused of involvement in the 1981 Brinks Robbery.

After graduating, in the 80s, Cohen worked for seven years at the Legal Aid Society in the Bronx. He also worked on the Winnebago, Omaha and Santee Sioux reservations for an anti-poverty program as a VISTA volunteer. After VISTA, he headed a drug program for homeless teens in Westchester County (N.Y.). In 1983 he earned a J.D. degree at Pace University Law School.

He briefly represented Larry Davis, accused of robbing and killing drug dealers, when he was a senior staff lawyer for the Legal Aid Society. In 1990 Cohen joined with William Kunstler and Lynne Stewart (who was indicted for this case) for the defense of the sheikh Abdul Rahman Yasin, the mastermind of the World Trade Center bombing in 1993.

Cohen has frequently visited the Gaza Strip. One of his clients was Mousa Abu Marzook, a member of Hamas; he also defended Hezbollah and al-Qaeda members such as a relative of Bin Laden, his son in law, a case that generated harsh criticism. Cohen has said that he will not take a major case unless he identifies with the client's politics and likes them, and he has been accused of anti-Semitism and of being a "terrorist mouthpiece."

In 1996, Cohen represented squatters occupying buildings in New York City's East Village, and advocated that the area become a "zone of resistance" against gentrification, with checkpoints on the borders.

He was involved in unsuccessful negotiations for the release of Peter Kassig, held hostage by ISIS. By request of an old friend, the navy veteran John Penley, Cohen accepted the role of intermediary. According to The Intercept: "While he lacked connections with Islamic State itself, Cohen was able to reach out to Jordan-based Islamist scholar Abu Muhammad al-Maqdisi, and convince him to open discussions with Turki Binali" but the negotiation failed when Abu Muhammad Maqdisi was arrested.

In 2002, Cohen represented Mazin Assi, who was found guilty for the 2000 New York synagogue firebombing.

== Felony conviction ==
In April 2014, Cohen pleaded guilty to obstructing and impeding the Internal Revenue Service and failing to file tax returns, a felony. The conviction resulted in loss of his law license, for which he reapplied after his release from prison. He was charged with receiving cash payments totaling $35,000 that were not reported to the IRS. Prosecutors said he failed to report more than $3 million to the IRS and ran his law practice largely "off the books." He was sentenced to eighteen months in federal prison. He claimed the case was politically motivated. Cohen was sentenced to 18 months in prison and served time at USP Canaan in Waymart, Pennsylvania, U.S. penitentiary.
