= Shirah Neiman =

American prosecutor (1943–2025)

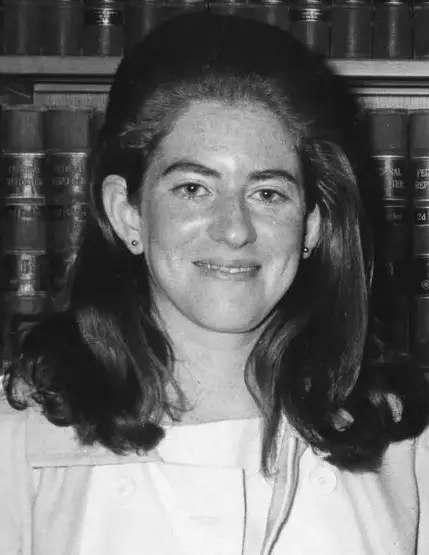
- Neiman in 1970
- Born: December 19, 1943; New York City, U.S.
- Died: January 4, 2025 (aged 81); New York City, U.S.
- Education: Barnard College; Columbia Law School
- Occupation: Prosecutor
- Employer: U.S. Attorney's Office for the Southern District of New York

Shirah Neiman (December 19, 1943 – January 4, 2025) was an American prosecutor who served for over four decades in the U.S. Attorney's Office for the Southern District of New York. She was the first woman in decades to be hired into the office's criminal division and held various leadership roles, including deputy U.S. attorney and chief counsel.

== Early life and education ==
Neiman was born in Brooklyn, New York, on December 19, 1943, to Morris and Dorothy Neiman. Her father was a professor of Hebrew literature at Brooklyn College and the Ramaz School, and her mother was a Juilliard-trained concert pianist who died in 1967. Raised in an Orthodox Jewish household, Neiman attended the Ramaz School, where she excelled in Talmudic studies. In her junior year, she protested gender discrimination when girls were diverted to typing and cooking classes while boys continued Torah study. Although her appeal to the principal was unsuccessful, she graduated as salutatorian.

Neiman graduated cum laude from Barnard College in 1965. She credited her decision to pursue a legal career to Phoebe Morrison, a former judge and Yale Law School graduate who was one of her professors at Barnard. Following her undergraduate studies, Neiman attended Columbia Law School, where she served on the law review and was a Harlan Fiske Stone Scholar for all three years. She graduated magna cum laude in 1968. During her time at Columbia, her father completed his Ph.D., and they received their degrees on the same day.

== Career ==
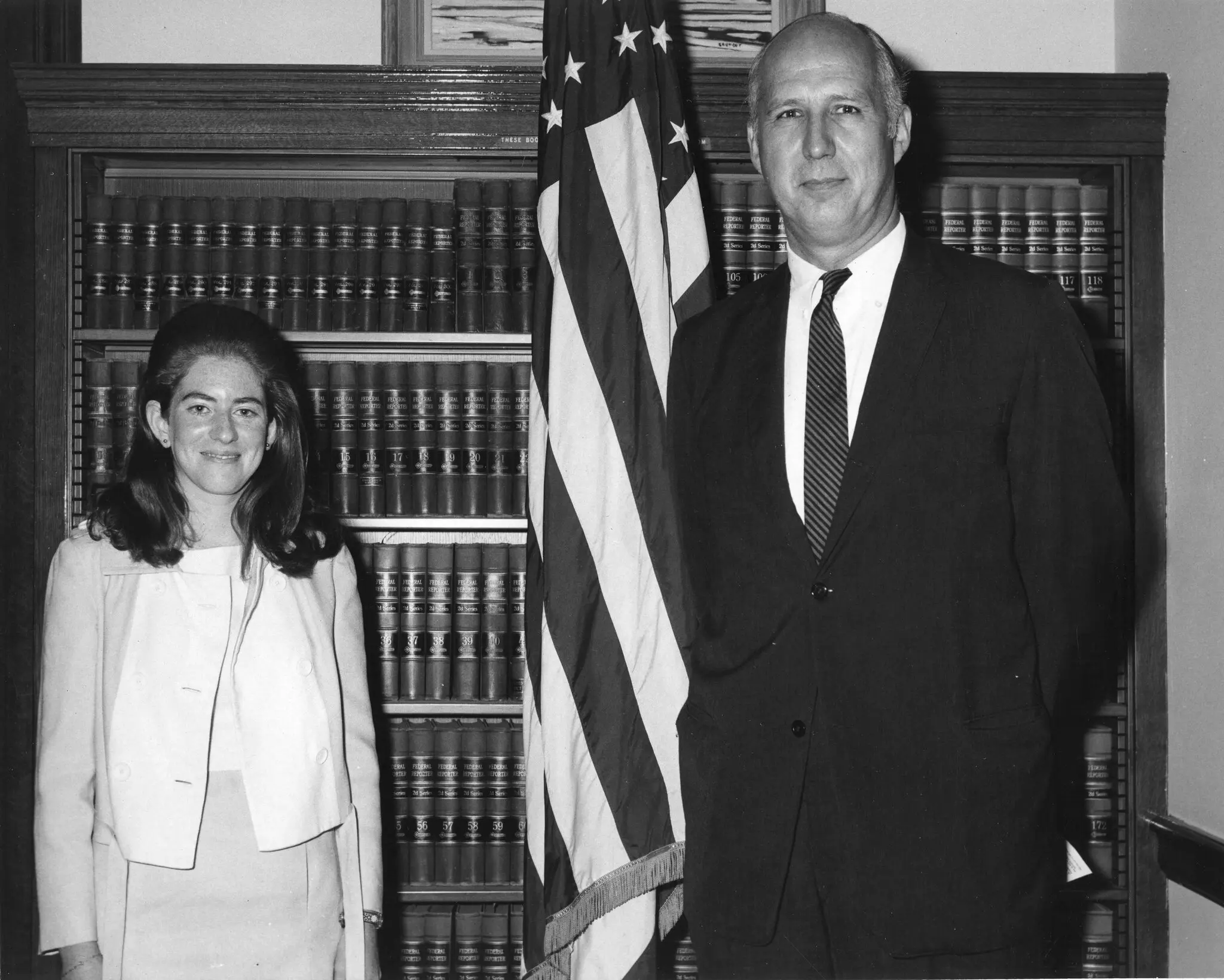
Neiman at her swearing-in ceremony in 1970 with U.S. Attorney Whitney North Seymour Jr.

Neiman clerked for two federal judges, including Milton Pollack of the U.S. District Court for the Southern District of New York. During her clerkship, she worked on cases such as the prosecution of antiwar activist Sam Melville.

In 1970, Neiman became an assistant U.S. attorney in the criminal division of the U.S. Attorney's Office for the Southern District of New York, becoming the first woman hired in that division since 1952. She faced a challenging application process, including sexist questions about her ability to persuade juries and work with male Federal Bureau of Investigation (FBI) agents. Neiman declined a higher-paying offer from a private law firm to accept the position, stating that the role offered unparalleled trial experience. Her starting salary was US$14,300 (equivalent to $115,785 in 2024) compared to the private sector offer of US$19,000 (equivalent to $153,840 in 2024).

In her early years in the criminal division, Neiman argued against assumptions that women could not handle criminal cases or navigate male-dominated environments, stating, "Try it and see." She managed a caseload of approximately 100 cases at various stages of development and emphasized that success was measured by thorough case preparation and courtroom performance rather than conviction rates.

Neiman specialized in criminal tax law and white-collar prosecutions. In 1979, she led the successful prosecution of mobster Anthony Salerno. She briefly left the Southern District in 1975 to serve on the U.S. Department of Justice task force investigating the Watergate scandal before returning to her role in New York.

From 1993 to 2002, Neiman served as deputy U.S. attorney under Mary Jo White. In 2002, she became chief counsel to U.S. Attorney James Comey and retired in 2011 after more than 40 years of service. In 2012, she was appointed to monitor compliance at BNP Paribas as part of a New York State Department of Financial Services investigation into violations of U.S. sanctions.

== Personal life and death ==
Neiman was fluent in Hebrew and French and took modern dance classes before her role as an assistant U.S. attorney limited her time for outside activities.

Neiman died in Riverdale, Bronx on January 4, 2025, following a recent diagnosis of multiple tumors. She was 81.
