= Conservative Synagogue Adath Israel of Riverdale =

Conservative synagogue in the Bronx, New York

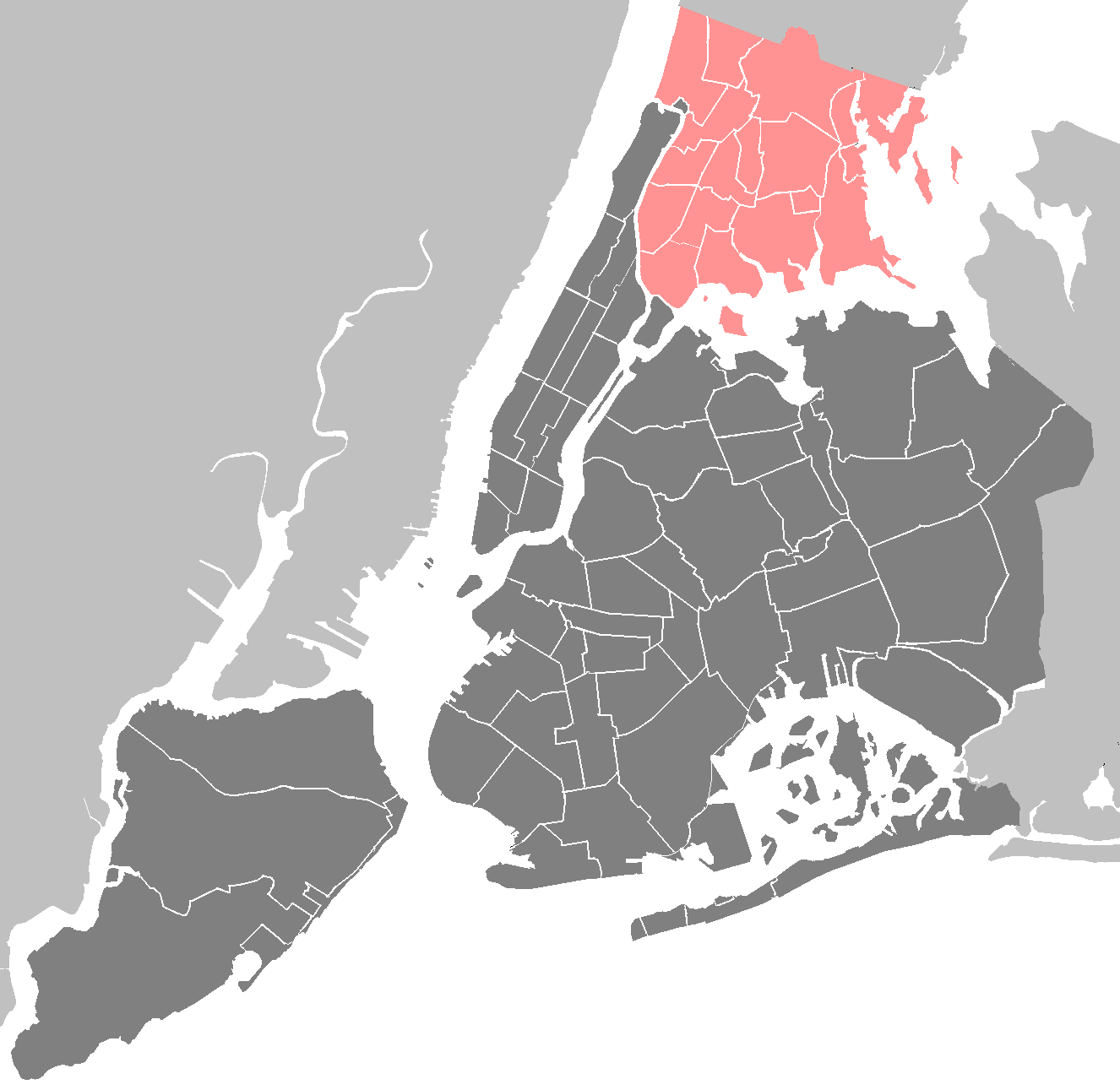
- Location in The Bronx, New York City

Religion
- Affiliation: Conservative Judaism
- Ecclesiastical or organisational status: Synagogue
- Governing body: United Synagogue of Conservative Judaism
- Leadership: Rabbi Barry Dov Katz
- Status: Active

Location
- Location: Riverdale, The Bronx, New York City, New York
- Country: United States
- Coordinates: 40°53′52.36″N 73°54′25.81″W

Architecture
- Architect: Percival Goodman
- Type: Synagogue
- Established: 1954 (as a congregation)
- Completed: 1962

Website
- www.csair.org

The Conservative Synagogue Adath Israel of Riverdale (CSAIR) is a Conservative, egalitarian congregation and synagogue located in Riverdale, The Bronx, in New York City, New York.

Founded in 1954, the congregation is a member of the United Synagogue of Conservative Judaism and is led by Rabbi Barry Dov Katz, who was appointed to the position in 1998.

== History ==
The Conservative Synagogue of Riverdale was founded in 1954, with Max Kadushin serving as its first rabbi. The first building to be erected by the new congregation was its Hebrew school.

In 1962, a new sanctuary, designed by architect Percival Goodman, was dedicated and the community started to grow. In 1973, the Conservative Synagogue merged with Adath Israel of the Grand Concourse. When the two joined, a plaque was dedicated: "We loved our house of worship. It enriched our lives and uplifted our souls."

CSAIR has daily morning and evening services, regular holiday services, an additional monthly havurah alternative service, extensive child-focused religious and educational services, the Marsha Dane Hebrew School, and various adult education programs.

=== 2000 firebombing attack ===
On the morning of October 8, 2000, the eve of Yom Kippur, the holiest day in the Jewish year, two Molotov cocktails were thrown, but did not ignite, at the synagogue's door. Two Palestinian men were arrested and the first suspects to be prosecuted under recently enacted New York's Hate Crimes Act of 2000, which increased penalties for crimes motivated by bias. 21-year-old Mazin Assi was found guilty on seven counts of weapons possession, harassment and attempted arson, along with hate crimes violations and received 15 years in prison. The getaway driver, 18-year-old Mohammed Alfaqih, was found guilty on one count of criminal mischief and sentenced to four years in prison. Separate trials for Assi and Alfaqih took place in the Bronx County Courthouse, but the respective juries heard the same testimony and saw the same evidence. Both Assi and Alfaqih made taped confessions. Assi told police he "wanted to teach the rich Jews of Riverdale a lesson for supporting Israel." Alfaqih told police he "had hate in his heart for Jewish people." During the trial, the Jewish community avoiding having visibly Jewish observers in the courtroom. Assi was defended by attorney Stanley Cohen and Lynne Stewart and appealed his sentence, arguing that the hate crime law had not gone into effect on the day of the attack. He also said his actions could not be a hate crime because they were directed at a synagogue, rather than people. The New York State Supreme Court Appellate Division ruled that a hate crime conviction was valid. On March 31, 2010, the New York Court of Appeals, the state's highest court, unanimously said that the stricter punishments under the hate crime law applied. Bronx District Attorney Robert Johnson and the synagogue's president Barry Dov Katz called the sentences appropriate. Katz called the appeal "an affront to our common humanity."

== Notable members ==
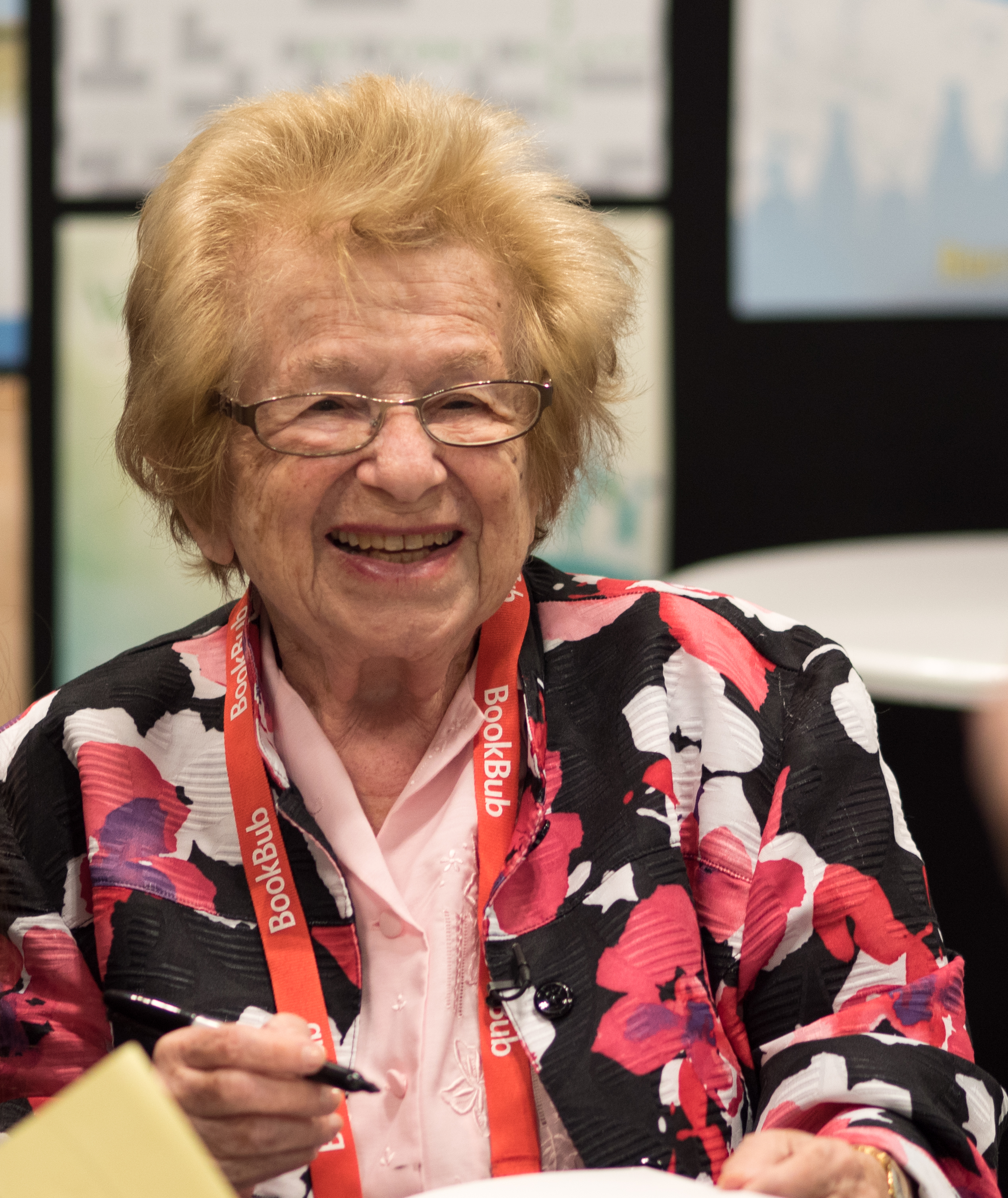
Dr. Ruth Westheimer

- Ruth Westheimer (1928–2024), better known as Dr. Ruth, German-American sex therapist, talk show host, author, professor, Holocaust survivor, and former Haganah sniper.

== Notable rabbis ==
- Norman Salit (1896–1960)
