= Pinkhos Churgin =

Israeli scholar

- פנחס חורגין
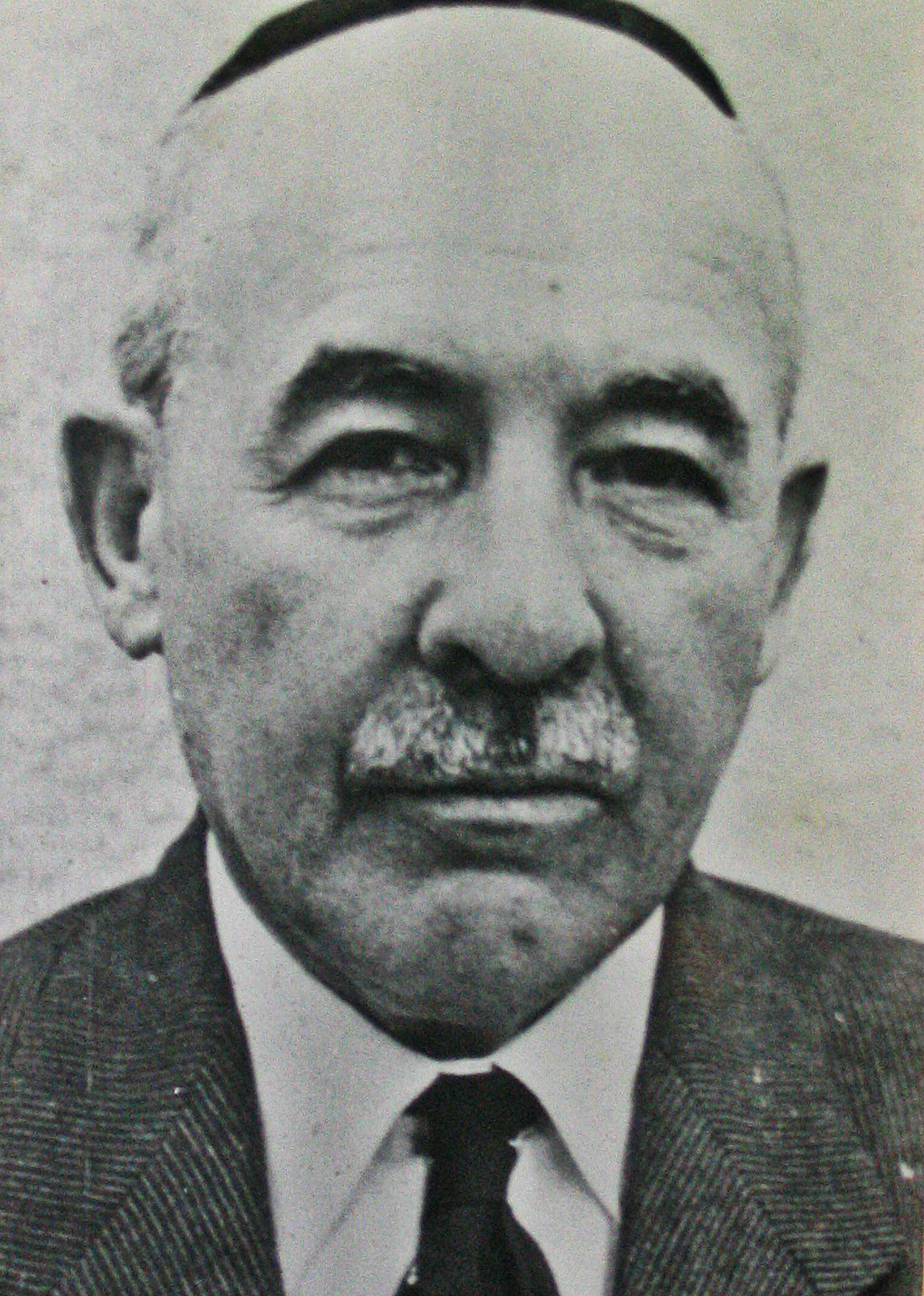
- Pinkhos Churgin
- Born: 1894; Pohost, Belorussia
- Died: 1957 (aged 62–63)
- Known for: First President of Bar-Ilan University

Pinkhos Churgin (Hebrew: פנחס חורגין; 1894–1957) was an Israeli scholar who was the first President of Bar-Ilan University.

== Biography ==
Churgin was born in Pohost, Belorussia, a shtetl near Pinsk. In 1907 he and his parents immigrated to Palestine, and settled in Jerusalem. In 1910 he went to study at the Volozhin Yeshiva. Churgin returned to Palestine in 1912. In 1915 he went to the United States and taught Hebrew. He studied as an undergraduate at Clark College, and then at Yale University, earning a Ph.D. in the field of Semitics, as a student of the famous researcher Charles C. Torrey. His dissertation, "Targum Jonathan to the Prophets", was published by Yale in 1927 and has since become a classic. It was twice reprinted in the 1980s.

He was instrumental in the development of Yeshiva University in New York City. In 1920 he began teaching at their Teachers' Institute. He was appointed dean of the Institute in 1924. In 1949 Churgin was named president of the Mizrachi Organization of America. He moved to Israel in 1955 to serve as the first President of Bar-Ilan University. He was succeeded as president in 1957 by Joseph H. Lookstein.
