= Noam T. Wasserman =

American academic

- Education: University of Pennsylvania (BS Econ., BSE); Harvard University (MBA, PhD)
- Occupation: Academic
- Children: 8

Dr. Noam T. Wasserman is an American academic. He is currently the head of school at the Ramaz School. Previously, he held the position of dean at Yeshiva University Sy Syms School of Business; before that, he was professor of clinical entrepreneurship at the University of Southern California and the director of USC's Founders Central Initiative. Additionally, he previously served as an associate professor of business administration at the Harvard Business School. His research has focused on Organizational Behavior and Entrepreneurship. He has written about the challenges faced by the founders of startup companies.

== Early life ==
Noam Wasserman graduated from the University of Pennsylvania in 1992, where he received a Bachelor of Science degree in computer science and engineering and a Bachelor of Science in economics from Wharton. He received a master in business administration from the Harvard Business School in 1999, where he was a Baker Scholar. He received a master's degree in sociology from the Harvard Graduate School of Arts and Sciences in 2001, and a PhD in organizational behavior from the Harvard Business School in 2002.

== Career ==
Dr. Wasserman was an assistant professor of business administration at the Harvard Business School from 2003 to 2008. He was an associate professor from 2008 to 2016. He received the Innovation in Entrepreneurship Pedagogy Award from the Academy of Management in 2010 for "Founders’ Dilemmas", a "second-year M.B.A. elective course" at the HBS. The course asks students if they plan on starting their own businesses after the HBS, and highlights what interpersonal issues they may encounter. Additionally, Wasserman was a visiting associate professor at Stanford University in 2014. In 2016, Wasserman become a professor of clinical entrepreneurship at the University of Southern California. He is also the founding director of USC's Founder Central Initiative, which researches issues and decision making faced by founders in the early stages of startups.

Wasserman is the author of The Founder’s Dilemmas: Anticipating and Avoiding the Pitfalls That Can Sink a Startup. The book is based on data on "10,000 founders from 3,500 start-ups" assembled by Wasserman. It was reviewed in the Family Business Review.

Dr. Wasserman draws a distinction between chief executive officers who are "Kings" and want to keep their job at all costs, and those who are "Rich" and don't mind stepping down if this leads to more profit-making for the company. While Wasserman writes about business corporations, Mark Charendoff, the president of the Maimonides Fund applies this dichotomy to philanthropic gifts, arguing that donors should ask themselves if the CEOs of non-profit organizations are more interested in the results derived from their donations, or in their own careerist self-interest.

On March 4, 2019, it was announced that Wasserman would become the dean of the Sy Syms School of Business at Yeshiva University. His position took effect in May 2019.

On November 25, 2024, it was announced that he would become Ramaz head of school. His position took effect on August 1, 2025.

== Personal life ==
Noam Wasserman is married, and he has eight children. They reside in Brookline, Massachusetts.
