= Haskel Lookstein =

American Modern Orthodox Rabbi (born 1932)

Rabbi Haskel Lookstein

Personal life
- Born: March 21, 1932 (age 94) New York City, New York
- Spouse: Audrey Katz (m. 1959)
- Children: 4
- Parents: Rabbi Joseph Lookstein (father); Gertrude (Gerdie) Schlang Lookstein (mother)
- Education: Ramaz School; Columbia University; Rabbi Isaac Elchanan Theological Seminary at Yeshiva University

Religious life
- Religion: Judaism
- Denomination: Orthodox Judaism

Jewish leader
- Predecessor: Joseph Lookstein
- Position: Senior Rabbi
- Synagogue: Congregation Kehilath Jeshurun
- Began: 1966
- Ended: 2015
- Other: Principal, Ramaz School (1966 – 2015)
- Semikhah: 1958 (RIETS)

Haskel Lookstein (born March 21, 1932) is an American Modern Orthodox rabbi. He is Rabbi Emeritus of Congregation Kehilath Jeshurun on the Upper East Side of Manhattan, where he served most his entire rabbinic career (1958–2015) He was also principal of the Ramaz School from 1966 through 2015.

== Early years and personal life ==
Lookstein was born in 1932 to Joseph and Gerdie (Schlang) Lookstein in Manhattan. His father was assistant rabbi at Kehilath Jeshurun at the time, and his mother was granddaughter of the senior rabbi, Rabbi Moses Zevulun Margolies.

As a child in the 1940s and 1950s, Lookstein would maintain a "shul scorecard", tracking the weather, the subject of his father's sermon, the details of any special occasions, and the number of congregants in attendance, which hovered in the 200s, depending on the subject of the sermon.

He married the former Audrey Katz on June 21, 1959. They have four children. Their daughter Debra (Debbie) married Shelly David Senders, a pediatrician, in 1986.Their son, Rabbi Joshua Lookstein is the Associate Head of School at the Ramaz School.

== Education ==
Lookstein started first grade at the Ramaz School in 1937, the year it was established by his father, by then senior rabbi of Congregation Kehilath Jeshurun. The school was named in honor of Haskel Lookstein's great-grandfather and Rabbi Margolies.

Lookstein received his undergraduate degree from Columbia University and took a master's degree at Yeshiva University. After receiving his rabbinic ordination from Rabbi Isaac Elchanan Theological Seminary in 1958, he was offered pulpits in Detroit and at the Sephardic Temple in Cedarhurst, New York. He was also offered a position as an assistant rabbi serving under his father, Rabbi Joseph Lookstein, a choice he was warned against. Ultimately, he decided for his home congregation and was installed as assistant rabbi at Congregation Kehilath Jeshurun, serving under his father, on June 14, 1958.

== Work ==
In 1958, Rabbi Lookstein began serving as Assistant Rabbi of Congregation Kehilath Jeshurun. In 1966, The New York Times devoted an article to Lookstein's May 14 sermon on the weekly Torah portion of Behar / Bechukotai, in which Lookstein described the Talmud as a model for a modern civil rights manual. In the sermon, he characterized the 25th chapter of the Book of Leviticus, which is read at the beginning of Parashat Behar, as "one of the most profound sources" for the social consciousness of religion during the Civil Rights era, and went on to explicate the relevance of the Talmud, noting, for example, that it holds that no man is free if he does not have economic opportunity or the right to live where he chooses.

Also in 1966, Lookstein began his tenure as principal of the Ramaz School.

Rabbi Lookstein's political activism began with repeated visits to the former Soviet Union, and numerous rallies on behalf of Natan Sharansky and Soviet Jewry, and it continued with activism on behalf of the Jews of Israel and worldwide.

Following the death of his father, in July 1979, Rabbi Lookstein assumed the position of senior rabbi of Congregation Kehilath Jeshurun. His mother light-heartedly told him at the time that he'd finally have a nice office. Filled with concern at the responsibility of filling the role served by his father as the congregation's leader, he was reassured after his father's funeral by his mother, who said: "Haskel, you'll sit there; that was dad's seat", and shortly thereafter: "Well, you'll finally have a nice office"; successfully assuaging his worries.

He was selected by Newsweek magazine as the most influential Orthodox pulpit rabbi in the United States in 2008, ranked second nationwide behind Conservative Rabbi David Wolpe of Los Angeles. Newsweek's rankings were based on success in congregational growth and inspiration, leadership in the community and within his denominational movement, and the ability to serve the spiritual needs of his congregation.

Lookstein has a vision of an open and centrist Orthodox Judaism which he defines as "a middle of the road philosophy of Orthodox Judaism that embraces the entire community", with "an uncompromising love of all Jews".

== Controversy ==
=== President Obama's National Prayer Service ===
On January 21, 2009, Rabbi Lookstein was one of three rabbinical participants in the National Prayer Service at the National Cathedral, representing, loosely speaking, the Orthodox Jewish contingent. The Rabbinical Council of America (RCA), the primary American modern-Orthodox rabbinic association, initially took exception to his presence, stating that "participation in a prayer service held in the sanctuary of a church is prohibited" and adding: "Any member of the RCA who attends such a service does so in contravention of this policy and should not be perceived as representing the organization in any capacity." After publicizing its initial statement, however, the RCA softened its stance. Rabbi Basil Herring, its executive director, issued a new statement: "Rabbi Lookstein did not represent the Rabbinical Council of America in attending that service, and therefore, we have no comment on the matter."

=== Jewish conversions ===
A woman who was converted to Judaism by Lookstein was refused recognition as a Jew by an Israeli Rabbinical Court in Petah Tikva, Israel, part of an international controversy over just who outside of the official Israeli Rabbinate will have their conversions recognized in Israel. The controversy gained a significantly higher profile because Lookstein also converted Ivanka Trump, daughter of Donald Trump, prior to her 2009 marriage to Jared Kushner. The Israeli government sometimes does not accept conversions performed by "Orthodox rabbis not on its list of approved authorities." The rejection of conversions performed by Lookstein was condemned by the Jewish Agency for Israel, the large international NGO "responsible for the immigration ... and absorption of Jews and their families from the Diaspora into Israel," which accused the Chief Rabbinate of "undermining of the legitimacy of the Diaspora faith communities," including Orthodox rabbis outside of Israel.

=== RNC invocation ===
In July 2016, Lookstein accepted the invitation of Ivanka Trump, a member of his congregation, to offer the opening invocation at the 2016 Republican National Convention (RNC). After the invitation was made public, many Kehilath Jeshurun congregants, as well as Ramaz alumni, signed a petition requesting that Lookstein refrain from appearing at the RNC, condemning Trump's "racist, misogynistic rhetoric". Lookstein, responding to the uproar, backtracked, and in an e-mail sent out to the congregants, he explained that he was withdrawing from the RNC "in the interest of bringing our community together". His prepared remarks, which Lookstein also sent out, included the following benediction:

Almighty God: We know that we are living in very dangerous times, when all of these blessings are threatened from without, by forces of terror and unimaginable brutality, and from within, by those who sow the seeds of bigotry, hatred, and violence, putting our lives and our way of life at risk.

In the aftermath, some argued that the pressure put on Lookstein to withdraw was counterproductive, inferring, from the content of his prepared remarks, a subtle rebuke to then-nominee Trump.
