= Ramaz School =

Private school in New York City, United States

Coordinates: 40.7790°N 73.9564°W

- ישיבת רמז
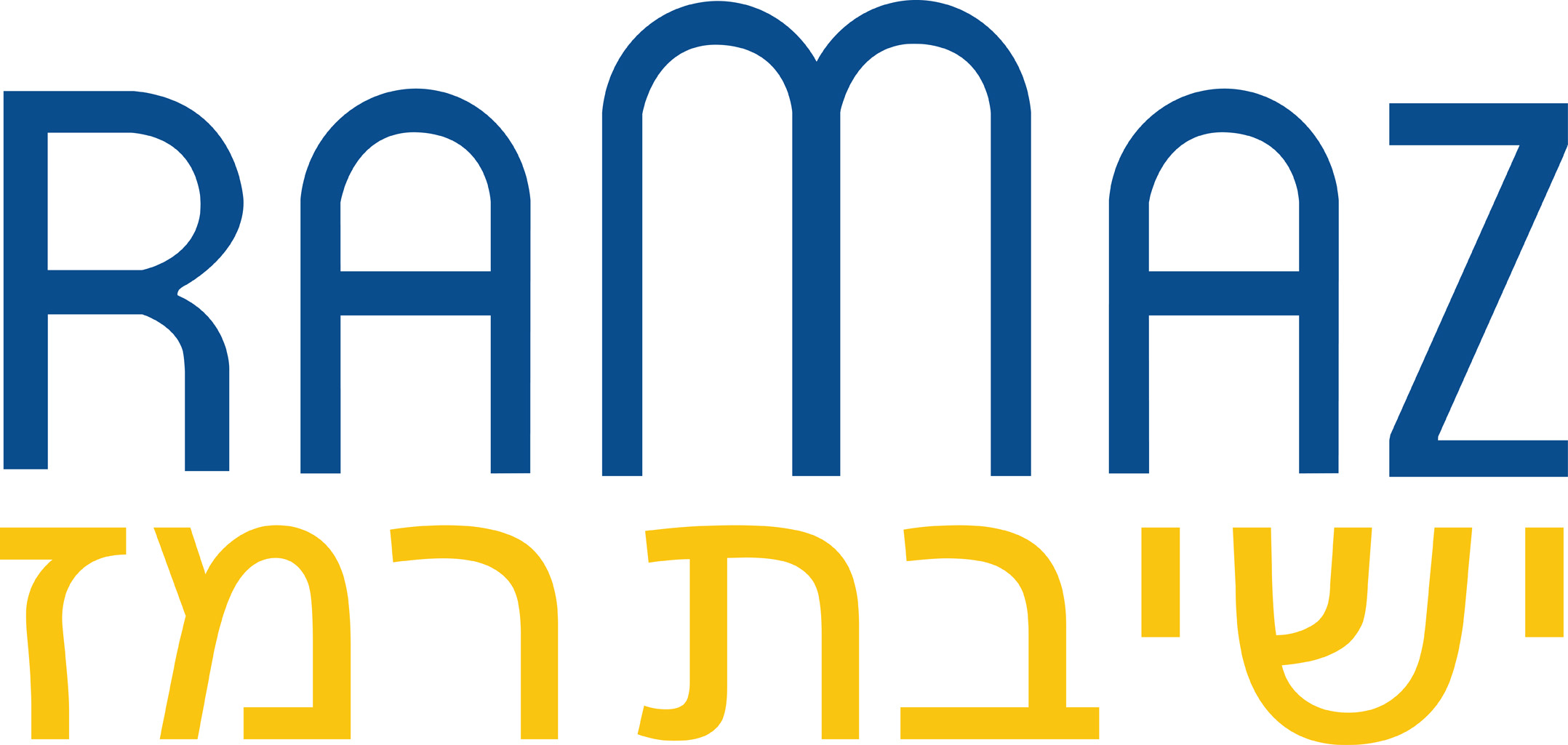

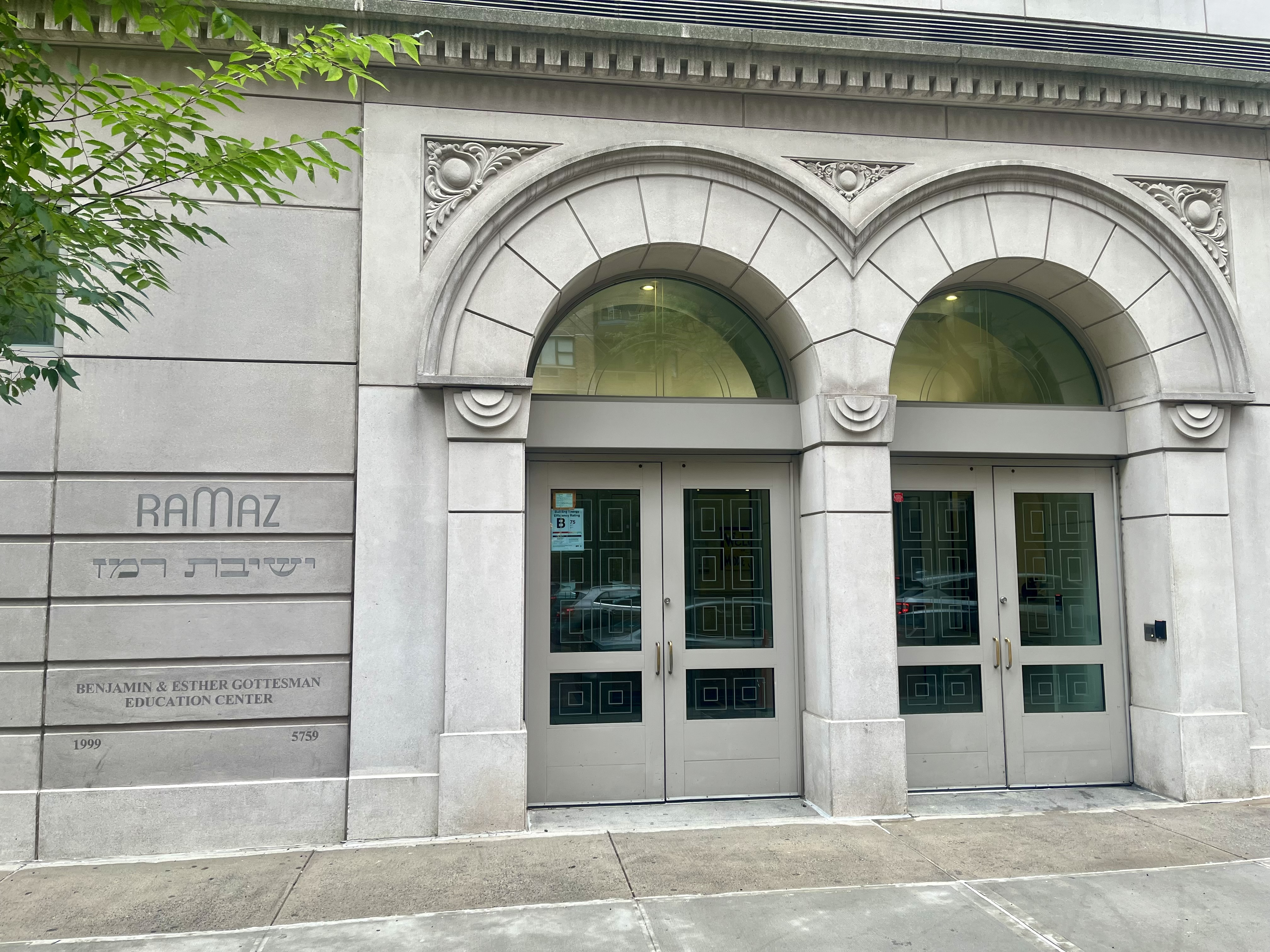
- The entrance to the middle school in 2025

Location
- 60 East 78th Street (Upper School); 114 East 85th Street (Middle School); 125 East 85th Street (Lower School & Early Childhood Center); New York City, New York; US

Information
- Type: Private coeducational Jewish Day School
- Religious affiliation: Modern Orthodox Judaism
- Established: 1937
- Founder: Joseph H. Lookstein
- Head of school: Noam T. Wasserman
- Faculty: 386
- Grades: Nursery-12
- Gender: Coeducational
- Enrollment: 1150
- Schedule: Day
- Campus type: Urban
- Colors: Blue and Gold
- Athletics conference: MYHSAL
- Mascot: The Ramaz Ram
- Team name: The Ramaz Rams
- Accreditation: Middle States Association of Colleges and Schools, New York State Association of Independent Schools
- Newspaper: Rampage
- Yearbook: Panorama
- Website: ramaz.org

The Ramaz School is an American coeducational Jewish Modern Orthodox day school which offers a dual curriculum of general studies taught in English and Judaic studies taught in Hebrew. The school is located on the Upper East Side of Manhattan in New York City. It has an early childhood center (nursery-kindergarten), a lower school (1st-4th grade), a middle school (5th-8th grade), and an upper school (9th-12th grade).

The Ramaz Upper School is a college preparatory program designed to develop an appreciation for and understanding of the intellectual disciplines that are part of western civilization. The Judaic studies curriculum provides a program through which the religious and cultural tradition of Judaism is both taught and experienced. Approximately fifty percent of the upper school student body advances from the middle school. Students commute from the Bronx, Brooklyn, Queens, Westchester, and Nassau counties in New York; Stamford and New Haven in Connecticut; and metropolitan New Jersey. Some students attend on a weekly or less frequent basis, coming from more distant communities.

Ramaz was founded in 1937 and is affiliated with Congregation Kehilath Jeshurun ("KJ"), a synagogue located on East 85th Street which shares a building with the lower school and is across the street from the middle school. The congregation and its rabbi, Joseph Lookstein, helped to found and finance the school.

Architect James Rossant designed the modernist upper school building, completed in 1981.

In 2007, the school was featured in the Wall Street Journal for its exceptional acceptance rates into elite universities.

== History ==
Founded in 1937 by Rabbi Joseph H. Lookstein through the generosity of New York lawyer and philanthropist Max J. Etra, Ramaz takes its name from the initials of Rabbi Moses Zevulun Margolies, the grandfather-in-law of Lookstein. The former principal, Rabbi Haskel Lookstein, is the son of Joseph Lookstein and was a member of the first class of six students.

Classes were initially held in many locations over the years, including the vestry rooms of Congregation Kehilath Jeshurun. After the closing of Finch College, Ramaz bought the college's campus and renovated the buildings.

In 2007, Joyce Villarin, a former nurse at the school, treated a child for an injury that he claimed his father caused. Villarin contacted the father who admitted to injuring his son. The Ramaz administration told Villarin not to report the incident to the police. Villarin did report this and was fired in 2008 because the school thought that she was "not a team player." Villarin sued the school in Manhattan Supreme Court in 2009, arguing that the state's Social Services Law obligated her to report the potential abuse. Under the law, school faculty are required to report to state authorities a suspicion that a child is being abused or mistreated. On April 12, 2012, the New York State Court of Appeals ruled in favor of Villarin and found that she can sue the school for retaliatory termination.

On November 30, 2007, The Wall Street Journal listed Ramaz as one of the top schools for graduates entering the top eight universities in the country, with 10 out of a class of 100 (class of 2007) going to these schools.

In January 2009, The Wall Street Journal reported that Ramaz lost $6 million in the collapse of the Bernard Madoff investment scheme.

The Ramaz School had proposed a 28-story project to be built in place of the Lower School during 2008–2010. The building would have replaced the current school with a new building split into ten floors used by the school and topped by 18 floors of condominiums. Air rights of the adjoining synagogue would be transferred for use by the adjoining school/condo structure. The project may have had to be scaled back following a review by the city's Board of Standards & Appeals because the height is more than what is permitted at this site. The plans were withdrawn by the school in July 2008. However, due to a fire in the adjacent Congregation Kehilath Jeshurun building in July 2011, the Lower school began to undergo repairs and refurbishments for water damage. Since the building was not ready to welcome students that September, the Temple Emanu-El of New York and Park Avenue Synagogue volunteered their facilities for students until November 2011. On November 8, 2011, the Lower school reopened its doors.

In 2019, it was discovered that an anonymous donation of $500,000 which Ramaz received in 2007 had been from one of Jeffrey Epstein's private charities. The donation was reported to be a thank-you to the lawyer Jay Lefkowitz, whose children attended Ramaz, in exchange for his securing Epstein's plea deal.

== Co-curricular activities and athletics ==
The Ramaz School's team name is the Ramaz Rams, and their logo is a Ram's head. Ramaz fields a number of competitive and recreational athletic teams throughout the school year. In the Upper School, there are varsity teams for both boys and girls in basketball, tennis, volleyball, and floor hockey; these teams compete in both the Yeshiva High School Athletic League and local independent school leagues. Ramaz also fields soccer, baseball, swim, table tennis, and track teams.

Ramaz's Model Congress team participates in the University of Pennsylvania and Princeton University Model Congress tournaments, and their Model UN team competes in the annual Yeshiva University National Model United Nations event. Ramaz's College Bowl team participates in independent tournaments, their Math Team competes in the New York Math League and the Mandelbrot Competition, the Chess Club competes in the Yeshiva Chess League, the Science Olympiad team competes against 15 other New York and New Jersey schools in a competition administered by the Board of Jewish Education, and their Hidon HaTanakh and Torah Bowl teams compete against local Jewish Day Schools. Ramaz Upper School students have succeeded in the 2004–2005 Siemens Westinghouse Competition and the 2007 NCTE Achievement Awards in Writing. Ramaz's creative writing magazine, Parallax, has also consistently been awarded the gold medal from the Columbia Scholastic Press Association.

The Ramaz Upper School also has special interest clubs, including a Robotics Club, Coalition for the Homeless, an Israel Advocacy Club, and fine and performing arts clubs. The Ramaz Chamber Choir has competed in national choral competitions, performed on CBS Sunday Morning News, and at the White House and is on the Best of Jewish A Cappella, Volume 3.

== Notable alumni ==
- Aviva Cantor (born 1940), journalist, lecturer, and author
- Glenn Cohen (psychologist), chief psychologist of the Mossad
- Adam Ferziger (born 1964), historian
- Ari Gold (1974–2021), pop singer and songwriter
- Shai Held (born 1971), rosh yeshiva of Mechon Hadar
- Isaac Herzog (born 1960), 11th President of Israel, former Israeli Tourism Minister, chairman of the Labor party, head of the opposition, and son of former Israeli President Chaim Herzog
- Matthew Hiltzik (born 1972), CEO and president of Hiltzik Strategies, a consulting and communications firm
- Sam Lassner (born 1992), also known as Prince Fox, DJ, songwriter, and producer
- Nathan Lewin (born 1936), attorney
- Natasha Lyonne (born 1979), actress in Orange Is the New Black and creator of Russian Doll, writer, director, and producer
- Leandra Medine (born 1988), author, fashion blogger/designer
- Daphne Merkin (born 1954), author and journalist
- J. Ezra Merkin (born 1953), former money manager and Bernie Madoff affiliate
- Peter N. Miller (born 1964), historian and academic
- Michael Mukasey (born 1941), the 81st United States Attorney General
- Shirah Neiman (1943–2025), federal prosecutor in the U.S. Attorney's Office for the Southern District of New York, Deputy U.S. Attorney
- Haviva Ner-David (formerly Haviva Krasner-Davidson), Israeli feminist activist and rabbi
- Avi Nesher, (born 1952), Israeli film director
- Achinoam Nini (born 1969; known professionally as Noa), Israeli rock singer-songwriter, percussionist, poet, composer, and human rights activist
- Sam Nunberg (born 1981), former political advisor to Donald Trump
- Joshua Prager (born 1971), author and journalist
- Michael Recanati (1957–2015), businessman and philanthropist
- Philippe Reines (born 1969), Deputy Assistant Secretary of State, and spokesman for Secretary of State Hillary Clinton
- Danielle Sassoon (born 1986), former acting US Attorney for the Southern District of New York
- Baruch Shemtov (born 1987), fashion designer, entertainment reporter, journalist, and entrepreneur
- Adam Szubin, Acting U.S. Treasury Secretary, Acting U.S.Under Secretary for Terrorism and Financial Intelligence, and director of Treasury's Office of Foreign Assets Control (OFAC); lawyer at Sullivan & Cromwell
- Larry Tanz (born 1970), VP of Global Television at Netflix
- Merryl Tisch, New York State Schools Chancellor (through 2015)
- Tevi Troy, Deputy Secretary of the U.S. Department of Health and Human Services
- David Twersky (1950–2010), journalist, Zionist activist, and peace advocate
- Elisha Wiesel (born 1972), chief information officer of Goldman Sachs; hedge fund manager of Niche Plus; son of Elie Wiesel, chairman of the Elie Wiesel Foundation for Humanity
- Elizabeth Wurtzel (1967–2020), author of Prozac Nation, journalist, attorney
