= Bechukotai =

33rd weekly Torah portion

Bechukotai, Bechukosai, or Bəḥuqothai (Biblical) (בְּחֻקֹּתַי bəḥuqqōṯay—Hebrew for "by my decrees," the second word, and the first distinctive word, in the parashah) is the 33rd weekly Torah portion (פָּרָשָׁה, parashah) in the annual Jewish cycle of Torah reading and the 10th and last in the Book of Leviticus. It constitutes Leviticus 26:3–27:34. The parashah addresses blessings for obeying the law, curses for disobeying it, and vows. The parashah is made up of 3,992 Hebrew letters, 1,013 Hebrew words, 78 verses, and 131 lines in a Torah Scroll (סֵפֶר תּוֹרָה, Sefer Torah).

Jews generally read it in May or early June. The lunisolar Hebrew calendar contains up to 55 weeks, the exact number varying between 50 in common years and 54 or 55 in leap years. In leap years (for example, 2024 and 2027), Parashat Bechukotai is read separately. In common years (for example, 2025 and 2026), Parashat Bechukotai is combined with the previous parashah, Behar, to help achieve the needed number of weekly readings.

In years when the first day of Passover falls on a Sabbath (as it did in 2022), Jews in Israel and Reform Jews read the parashah following Passover one week before Conservative and Orthodox Jews in the Diaspora. In such years, Jews in Israel and Reform Jews celebrate Passover for seven days and thus read the next parashah (in 2018, Shemini) on the Sabbath one week after the first day of Passover, while Conservative and Orthodox Jews in the Diaspora celebrate Passover for eight days and read the next parashah (in 2018, Shemini) one week later. In some such years (for example, 2018), the two calendars realign when Conservative and Orthodox Jews in the Diaspora read Behar together with Bechukotai while Jews in Israel and Reform Jews read them separately.

== Readings ==
In traditional Sabbath Torah reading, the parashah is divided into seven readings, or עליות, aliyot.

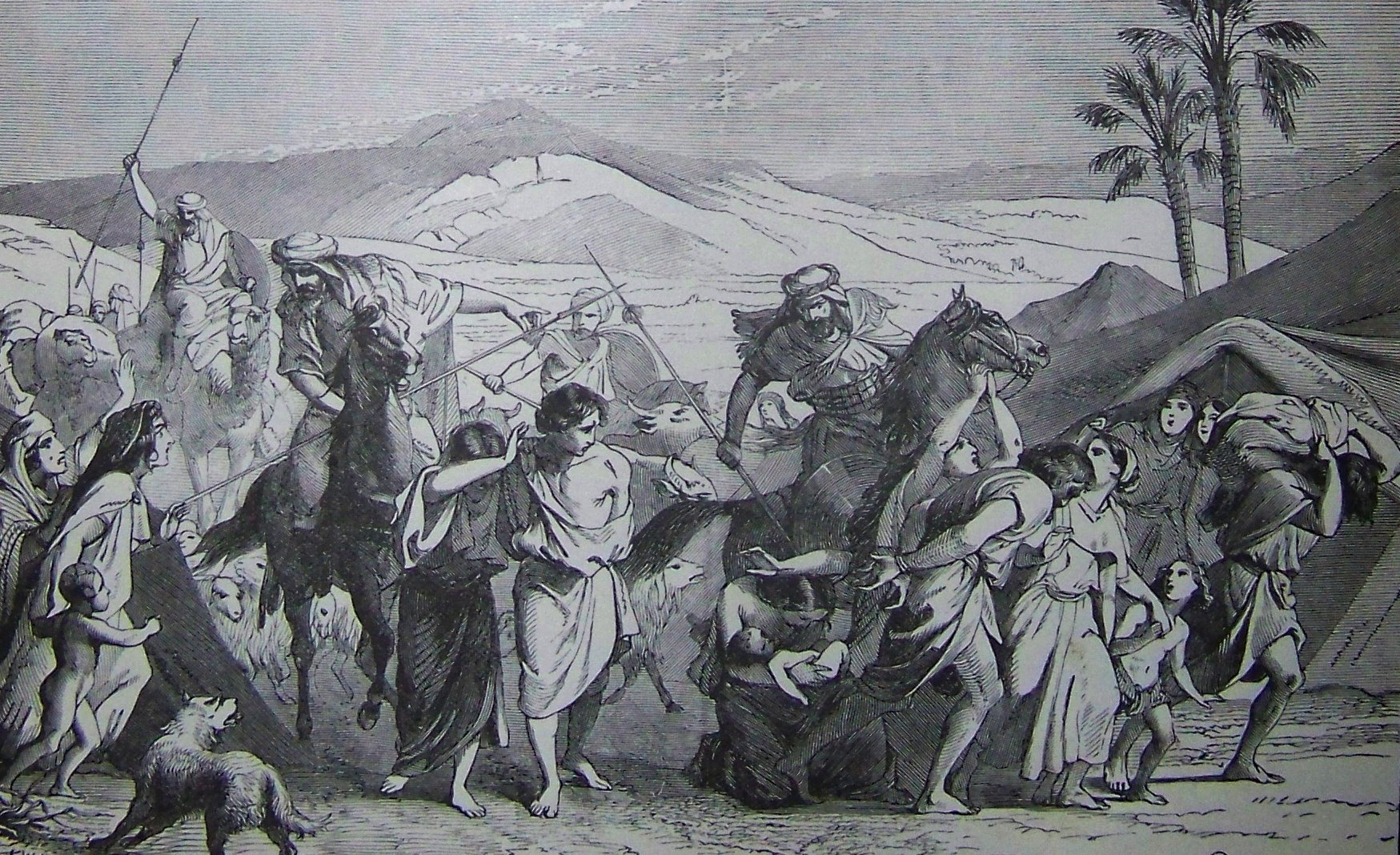
Israelites Carried Captive (illustration from the 1890 Holman Bible)

=== First reading—Leviticus 26:3–5 ===
In the first reading, God promises that if the Israelites follow God's laws, God will bless Israel with rains in their season, and abundant harvests.

=== Second reading—Leviticus 26:6–9 ===
In the second reading, God promises that if the Israelites follow God's laws, God would bless Israel with peace, victory over enemies, and fertility, and God's presence.

=== Third reading—Leviticus 26:10–46 ===
In the third reading, God promises that if the Israelites follow God's laws, God will bless Israel with God's presence. But in the section known as Tocheichah or the Admonitions, if the Israelites do not observe God's commandments, God will wreak upon Israel misery, consumption, fever, stolen harvests, defeat by enemies, poor harvests, attacks of wild beasts, pestilence, famine, desolation, and timidity. Those who survive will be removed to the land of their enemies, where they will become heartsick over their iniquity, confess their sin, and atone. God promises them that He will remember His covenant with Jacob, Isaac, Abraham, and the ancients whom God freed from Egypt.

=== Fourth reading—Leviticus 27:1–15 ===
In the fourth reading, God told Moses to instruct the Israelites that when anyone vows to offer God the value of a human being, the following scale would apply:

- for a man from 20 to 60 years of age, 50 shekels of silver;
- for a woman from 20 to 60 years, 30 shekels;
- for a boy from 5 to 20 years, 20 shekels;
- for a girl from 5 to 20 years, 10 shekels;
- for a boy from 1 month to 5 years, 5 shekels;
- for a girl from 1 month to 5 years, 3 shekels;
- for a man 60 years or over, 15 shekels; and
- for a woman 60 years or over, 10 shekels.

But if a vower could not afford the payment, the vower must appear before the priest, and the priest will assess the vower according to what the vower could afford. If the vow concerns an animal that could be brought as an offering, the animal is holy, and one cannot exchange another for it, and if one does substitute one animal for another, the thing vowed and its substitute will both be holy. If the vow concerns an unclean animal that could not be brought as an offering, the vower is to present the animal to the priest, the priest is to assess it, and if the vower wishes to redeem it, the vower is to add one-fifth to its assessment. If one consecrates a house to God, the priest is to assess it, and if the vower wishes to redeem it, the vower is to add one-fifth to the assessment.

=== Fifth reading—Leviticus 27:16–21 ===
In the fifth reading, if one consecrates to God land of one's ancestral holding, the priest is to assess it in accordance with its seed requirement. If the vower consecrates the land after the jubilee year, the priest is to compute the price according to the years left until the next jubilee year, and reduce the assessment accordingly. If the vower wishes to redeem the land, the vower is to add one-fifth to the assessment and retain title, but if the vower does not redeem the land and the land is sold, it will no longer be redeemable, and at the jubilee the land is to become the priest's holding.

=== Sixth reading—Leviticus 27:22–28 ===
In the sixth reading, if one consecrates land that one purchased (not land of ancestral holding) the priest is to compute the assessment up to the jubilee year, the vower is to pay the assessment as of that day, and in the jubilee the land is to revert to the person whose ancestral holding the land was. No firstling of a clean animal could be consecrated, for it already belongs to God. But a firstling of an unclean animal should be redeemed at its assessment plus one-fifth, and if not redeemed, is to be sold at its assessment. Nothing that one had proscribed for God (subjected to cherem) could be sold or redeemed.

=== Seventh reading—Leviticus 27:29–34 ===
In the seventh reading, no human being proscribed could be ransomed, but he is to be put to death. All tithes from crops are to be God's, and if one wishes to redeem any of the tithes, the tither is to add one-fifth to them. Every tenth head of livestock is to be holy to God, and the owner is not to choose among good or bad when counting off the tithe.

=== Readings according to the triennial cycle ===
Jews who read the Torah according to the triennial cycle of Torah reading read the parashah according to a different schedule.

== In inner-biblical interpretation ==
The parashah has parallels or is discussed in these Biblical sources:

=== Leviticus chapter 26 ===
Leviticus 26:9 addresses God's role in the creation of children. While Leviticus 12:6–8 required a new mother to bring a burnt-offering and a sin-offering, Leviticus 26:9 Deuteronomy 28:11 and Psalm 127:3–5 make clear that having children is a blessing from God, Genesis 15:2 and 1 Samuel 1:5–11 characterize childlessness as a misfortune, and Leviticus 20:20 and Deuteronomy 28:18 threaten childlessness as a punishment.

In Leviticus 26:14–15, God warned of consequences “if you reject My laws and spurn My rules.” Similarly, in Amos 2:4, the 8th century BCE prophet Amos condemned people of Judah, “because they have spurned the Teaching of the Lord and have not observed His laws.”

The Admonitions of Leviticus 26:14–38 are paralleled in Deuteronomy 28:15–68. The curses in Leviticus are considered more severe than those in Deuteronomy, for "the former [were] spoken by Moses in the name of God and the latter by Moses on his own initiative; the former is worded in first person and addressed to the Jews in plural while the latter is in first-person and addressed in singular form".

In Leviticus 26:42–45, God promises to "remember" God's covenant with Jacob, Isaac, and Abraham to deliver the Israelites and the Land of Israel. Similarly, God remembered Noah to deliver him from the flood in Genesis 8:1, God promised to remember God's covenant not to destroy the Earth again by flood in Genesis 9:15–16, God remembered Abraham to deliver Lot from the destruction of Sodom and Gomorrah in Genesis 19:29, God remembered Rachel to deliver her from childlessness in Genesis 30:22, God remembered God's covenant with Abraham, Isaac, and Jacob to deliver the Israelites from Egyptian bondage in Exodus 2:24 and 6:5–6, Moses called on God to remember God's covenant with Abraham, Isaac, and Jacob to deliver the Israelites from God's wrath after the incident of the Golden Calf in Exodus 32:13 and Deuteronomy 9:27, the Israelites were to blow upon their trumpets to be remembered and delivered from their enemies in Numbers 10:9, Samson called on God to deliver him from the Philistines in Judges 16:28, Hannah prayed for God to remember her and deliver her from childlessness in 1 Samuel 1:11 and God remembered Hannah's prayer to deliver her from childlessness in 1 Samuel 1:19, Hezekiah called on God to remember Hezekiah's faithfulness to deliver him from sickness in 2 Kings 20:3 and Isaiah 38:3, Jeremiah called on God to remember God's covenant with the Israelites to not condemn them in Jeremiah 14:21, Jeremiah called on God to remember him and think of him, and avenge him of his persecutors in Jeremiah 15:15, God promises to remember God's covenant with the Israelites and establish an everlasting covenant in Ezekiel 16:60, God remembers the cry of the humble in Zion to avenge them in Psalm 9:13, David called upon God to remember God's compassion and mercy in Psalm 25:6, Asaph called on God to remember God's congregation to deliver them from their enemies in Psalm 74:2, God remembered that the Israelites were only human in Psalm 78:39, Ethan the Ezrahite called on God to remember how short Ethan's life was in Psalm 89:48, God remembers that humans are but dust in Psalm 103:14, God remembers God's covenant with Abraham, Isaac, and Jacob in Psalm 105:8–10, God remembers God's word to Abraham to deliver the Israelites to the Land of Israel in Psalm 105:42–44, the Psalmist calls on God to remember him to favor God's people, to think of him at God's salvation, that he might behold the prosperity of God's people in Psalm 106:4–5, God remembered God's covenant and repented according to God's mercy to deliver the Israelites in the wake of their rebellion and iniquity in Psalm 106:4–5, the Psalmist calls on God to remember God's word to God's servant to give him hope in Psalm 119:49, God remembered us in our low estate to deliver us from our adversaries in Psalm 136:23–24, Job called on God to remember him to deliver him from God's wrath in Job 14:13, Nehemiah prayed to God to remember God's promise to Moses to deliver the Israelites from exile in Nehemiah 1:8, and Nehemiah prayed to God to remember him to deliver him for good in Nehemiah 13:14–31.

=== Leviticus chapter 27 ===
Tamara Cohn Eskenazi wrote that Biblical laws required Israelites to act as redeemers for relatives in four situations: (1) redemption of land in Leviticus 25:25–34, (2) redemption of persons from slavery, especially in Leviticus 25:47–50, (3) redemption of objects dedicated to the sanctuary in Leviticus 27:9–28, and (4) avenging the blood of a murdered relative in Numbers 35.

The Torah addresses tithes in Leviticus 27:30–33, Numbers 18:21–24, and Deuteronomy 14:22–29 and 26:12–14.

== In early nonrabbinic interpretation ==
The parashah has parallels or is discussed in these early nonrabbinic sources:

=== Leviticus chapter 27 ===
Reading Leviticus 27:1–8, Philo taught that in the case of those who vowed not merely property but their own selves, the law affixed a price to their vows, not having regard to the vower's beauty, importance, or anything of the kind, but treating each individual alike (separating men from women, and infants from the fully grown). Philo interpreted the law to set this price with equality for three reasons: (1) The importance of a vow is equal whether it was made by a person of great or of little importance. (2) Those who have made a vow should not be exposed to the treatment of slaves, who were valued according to the condition and beauty of their bodies. (3) Most importantly, while people value inequality, God honors equality.

== In classical rabbinic interpretation ==
The parashah is discussed in these rabbinic sources from the era of the Mishnah and the Talmud:

=== Leviticus chapter 26 ===
The Gemara reasoned that according to the opinion of Rabbi Meir, the words "If you walk in My statutes" in Leviticus 26:3 are written because "If you walk in My statutes," you will receive blessings; conversely, as Leviticus 26:15 tells us, "And if you shall reject My statutes," you will receive curses. However, the Gemara reasoned that according to the opinion of Rabbi Ḥanina ben Gamliel, we need both clauses, as it might enter one's mind to say: If one follows God's statutes one will receive a blessing, whereas if one rejects God's statutes one will receive neither a blessing nor a curse. The verse therefore teaches us that the rejection of God's statutes warrants a curse.

The Sifra asked whether the words "If you walk in My statutes" in Leviticus 26:3 might refer to observing religious duties. But the Sifra noted that the continuation of Leviticus 26:3 says, "and keep My commandments, and do them," and that must cover observing religious duties. Thus the Sifra concluded that the words "If you walk in My statutes" must mean laboring in the Torah.

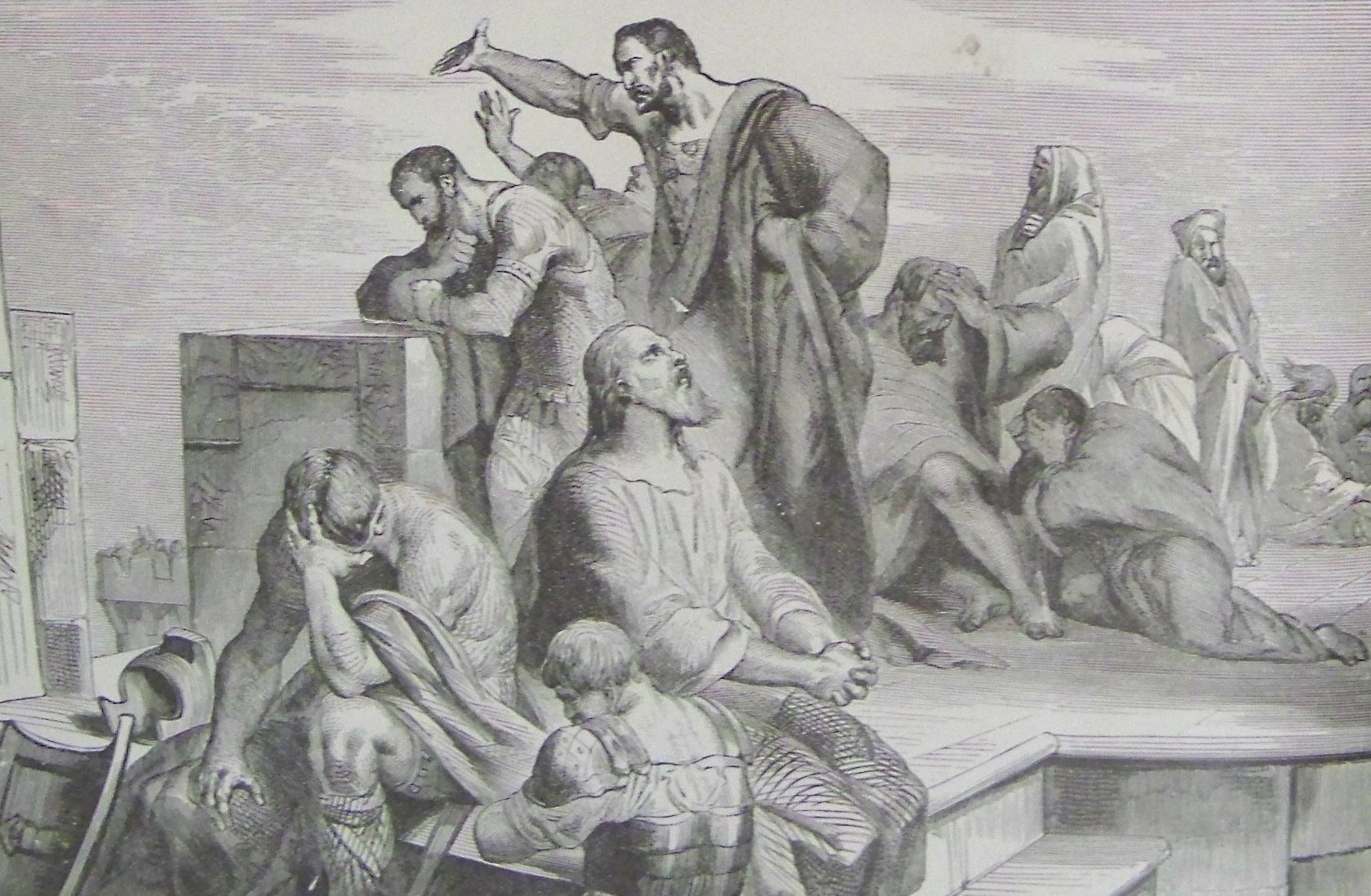
Despair of the defenders of Jerusalem (illustration from the 1890 Holman Bible)

The Mishnah taught that they read the blessings and curses of Leviticus 26:3–45 and Deuteronomy 28:1–68 on public fast days. The Mishnah taught that they did not interrupt the reading of the curses, but had one person read them all. In the Babylonian Talmud, however, Abaye taught that this rule applies only with regard to the curses in Leviticus 26, but with regard to the curses in Deuteronomy 28, one may interrupt them and have two different people read them. The Gemara explained this distinction by noting that the curses in Leviticus are stated in the plural, and Moses pronounced them from the mouth God, and as such, they are more severe. The curses in Deuteronomy, however, are stated in the singular, and Moses said them on his own, like the rest of the book of Deuteronomy, and are thus considered less harsh. The Tosefta reported that some say that on Tisha B'Av, they read the curses starting at Leviticus 26:14.

The Mishnah taught that when (in the words of Leviticus 26:6) "the sword [went] through [the] land," they would sound an alarm in all places, because it was a spreading evil.

The Tanna Devei Eliyahu taught that if you live by the commandment prohibiting murder (in Exodus 20:13 and Deuteronomy 5:17), then (in the words of Leviticus 26:6) "the sword shall not go through your land." If, however, you transgress the commandment, then (in God's words in Leviticus 26:33) “I will draw out the sword after you.”

The Gemara deduced that the Sanctuary (that is, the Temple in Jerusalem) was called “Tabernacle” from Leviticus 26:11, “And I will set my Tabernacle among you” (as this was said after the Israelites had already erected the Tabernacle in the wilderness). And the Gemara deduced from Exodus 25:8, “And let them make Me a sanctuary, that I may dwell among them,” that the Tabernacle was called “Sanctuary.” Thus the Gemara concluded that Scripture calls the Tabernacle “Sanctuary” and the Sanctuary (that is, the Temple) “Tabernacle,” and one may thus analogize between the two.

A baraita taught that several of the curses in Leviticus 26:16–35 result from particular transgressions. Rabbi Eleazar the son of Rabbi Judah read the word "behalah" ("terror") in Leviticus 26:16 as "be-challah" ("on account of challah") to interpret Leviticus 26:16 to teach that as punishment for the neglect of the challah tithe, God fails to bless what is stored, a curse is sent on prices, and people sow seed but others eat the harvest. The baraita interpreted Leviticus 26:22–23 to teach that as punishment for vain oaths, false oaths, desecration of God's Name, and desecration of the Sabbath, wild beasts multiply, domestic animals cease, population decreases, and roads become desolate. Using Jeremiah 33:25 to equate the word "covenant" with the Torah, the baraita interpreted Leviticus 26:25–26 to teach that as punishment for delaying judgment, perverting judgment, corrupting judgment, and neglecting Torah, sword and spoil increase, pestilence and famine come, people eat and are not satisfied, and people eat their scarce bread by weight. And the baraita interpreted Leviticus 26:30–35 to teach that as punishment for idolatry and failure to observe the Sabbatical (Shmita) and Jubilee (Yovel) years, the Jews are exiled and others come to dwell in their land.

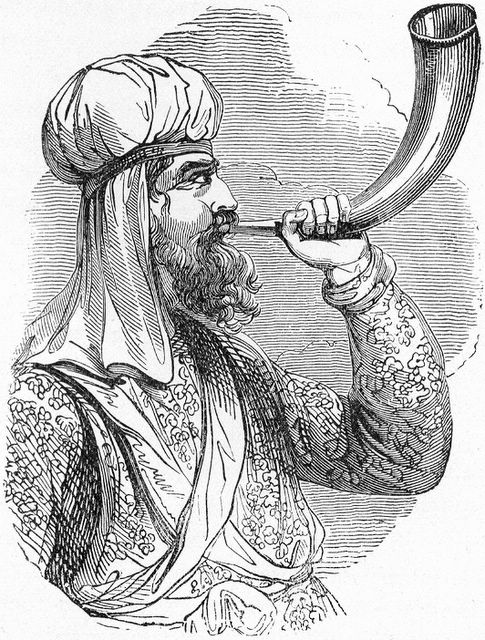
A priest blowing a horn (illustration from Henry Davenport Northrop's 1894 Treasures of the Bible)

Just as Leviticus 26:19 attributes famine to sin, the Mishnah taught that a famine from drought comes when some of the people do not give tithes, a famine from tumult and drought comes when all decide not to give tithes, and a famine of annihilation comes when they decide (in addition) not to set apart the dough offering. Just as Leviticus 26:25 attributes the sword to sin, the Mishnah taught that the sword comes to the world for the delay of justice, for the perversion of justice, and because of those who interpret the Torah counter to the accepted law. And just as Leviticus 26:25 attributes pestilence to sin, the Mishnah taught that pestilence comes to the world for failure to execute judgment in capital crimes and for violation of the laws governing the produce of the Sabbatical year.

The Mishnah taught that the coming of the sword, as in Leviticus 26:25, was one of several afflictions for which they sounded the ram's horn (shofar) in alarm in every locale, because it is an affliction that spreads.

The Gemara read the words of Leviticus 26:37, "And they shall stumble one upon another," to mean that one will stumble through the sin of another. The Gemara concluded that all everyone is held responsible for each another. Similarly, elsewhere, the Gemara read the words of Leviticus 26:37, "And they shall stumble one upon another," to mean that for all transgressions of the Torah, the whole world is punished. Thus the Gemara taught that all Jews stand as guarantors for one another.

The Gemara reconciled apparently discordant verses touching on vicarious responsibility. The Gemara noted that Deuteronomy 24:16 states: "The fathers shall not be put to death for the children, neither shall the children be put to death for the fathers; every man shall be put to death for his own sin," but Exodus 20:5 says: "visiting the iniquity of the fathers upon the children." The Gemara cited a baraita that interpreted the words "the iniquities of their fathers shall they pine away with them" in Leviticus 26:39 to teach that God punishes children only when they follow their parents' sins. The Gemara then questioned whether the words "they shall stumble one upon another" in Leviticus 26:37 do not teach that one will stumble through the sin of the other, that all are held responsible for one another. The Gemara answered that the vicarious responsibility of which Leviticus 26:37 speaks is limited to those who have the power to restrain their fellow from evil but do not do so.

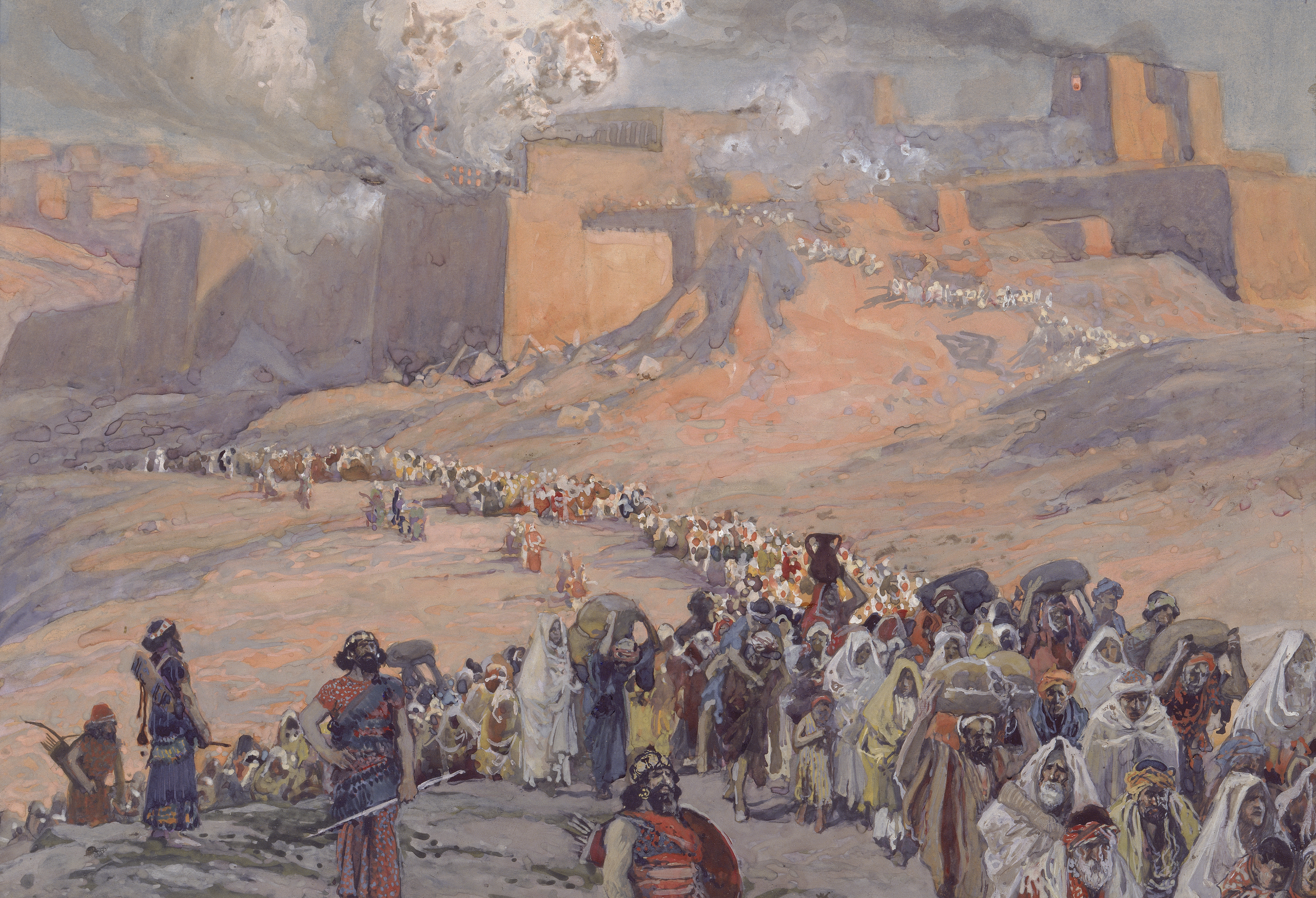
The Flight of the Prisoners (watercolor circa 1896–1902 by James Tissot)

In Leviticus 26:41, the heart is humbled. A midrash catalogued the wide range of additional capabilities of the heart reported in the Hebrew Bible. The heart speaks, sees, hears, walks, falls, stands, rejoices, cries, is comforted, is troubled, becomes hardened, grows faint, grieves, fears, can be broken, becomes proud, rebels, invents, cavils, overflows, devises, desires, goes astray, lusts, is refreshed, can be stolen, is enticed, errs, trembles, is awakened, loves, hates, envies, is searched, is rent, meditates, is like a fire, is like a stone, turns in repentance, becomes hot, dies, melts, takes in words, is susceptible to fear, gives thanks, covets, becomes hard, makes merry, acts deceitfully, speaks from out of itself, loves bribes, writes words, plans, receives commandments, acts with pride, makes arrangements, and aggrandizes itself.

The Tosefta noted that Leviticus 26:42 reports that God said that God would remember God's covenants with Jacob, Isaac, and Abraham—in that order—while in every other place, Scripture gives precedence to Abraham over the other Patriarchs. The Tosefta concluded that this teaches that Scripture deems the three equivalent to each other.

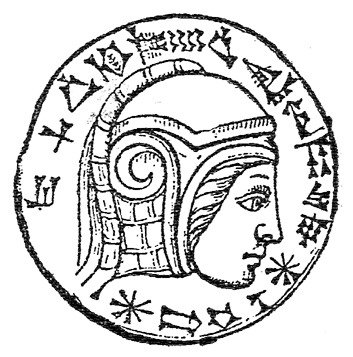
An engraving that might depict Nebuchadrezzar II, the Biblical Nebuchadnezzar

A midrash interpreted the words, "And yet for all that, when they are in the land of their enemies, I will not reject them," in Leviticus 26:44 to teach that the Shekhinah accompanied Israel into exile. Samuel of Nehardea interpreted the words, "I will not reject them, neither will I abhor them, to destroy them utterly, and to break My covenant with them, for I am the Lord their God," in Leviticus 26:44 to teach that God did "not reject" the Jews in the days of the Greeks, nor "abhor them" in the days of Nebuchadnezzar, nor "destroy them utterly" in the days of Haman, nor "break [God's] covenant with them" in the days of the Persians, "for [God will be] the Lord their God" in the days of Gog and Magog. Similarly, a Baraitha taught that God did "not reject" them in the days of the Chaldeans, for God sent them Daniel, Hananiah, Mishael, and Azariah, God did not "abhor them" in the days of the Greeks, for God sent them Simeon the Righteous, the Hasmonean and his sons, and Mattathias the High Priest, and God did not "destroy them utterly" in the days of Haman, for God sent them Mordecai and Esther, and God did not "break [God's] covenant with them" in the days of the Persians, for God sent them the house of Rabbi and the generations of Sages, "for [God will be] the Lord their God" in the time to come, when no nation or people will be able to subject them.

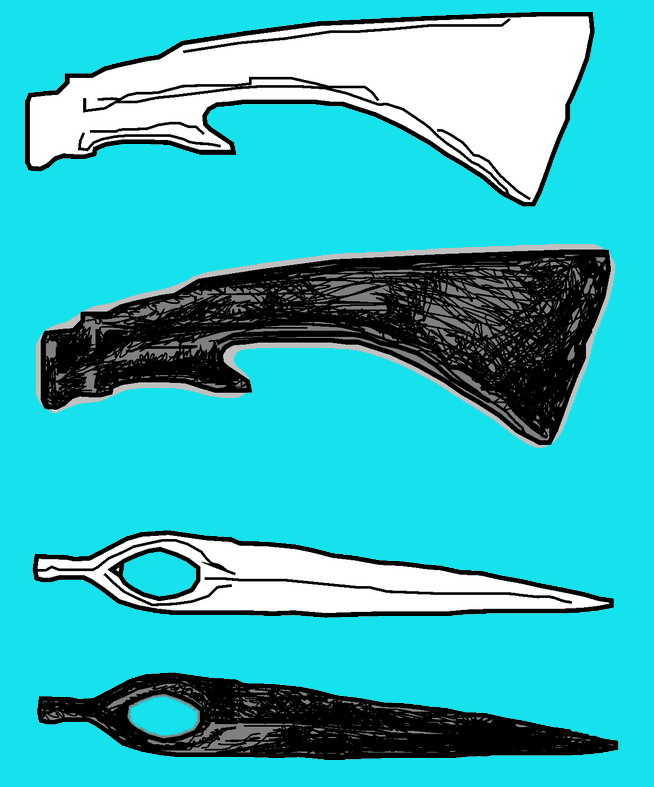
bronze ax heads of the type used between 1500 BCE and 500 BCE in the region of the Adriatic Sea (2008 drawing by Bratislav Tabaš)

=== Leviticus chapter 27 ===
Tractate Arakhin in the Mishnah, Tosefta, and Babylonian Talmud interpreted the laws of dedicatory vows in Leviticus 27:1–33.

Rabbi Simeon ben Yoḥai taught that just as the texts "He shall not break his word" in Numbers 30:3 and "Defer not to pay it" in Ecclesiastes 5:3 apply to vows, so they also apply to valuations, and thus Moses exhorted the Israelites in Leviticus 27:2: "When a man shall clearly utter a vow of persons to the Lord, according to your valuation... "

Interpreting the law of vows in Leviticus 27:2, the Mishnah taught that a young child's vows were not binding. When a girl turned 11 years old and throughout the year thereafter, they examined to determine whether she was aware of the significance of her vows. The vows of a girl 12 years old or older stood without examination. When a boy turned 12 years old and throughout the year thereafter, they examined to determine whether he was aware of the significance of his vows. The vows of a boy 13 years old or older stood without examination. For girls below age 11 or boys below age 12, even if they said that they knew in honor of Whose Name they vowed, their vows and dedications were not valid. After girls turned 12 or boys turned 13, even though they said that they did not know in the honor of Whose Name they vowed, their vows and dedications stood. The Sifri Zutta told that once a youth told Rabbi Akiva that the youth had dedicated a shovel. Rabbi Akiva asked the youth whether perhaps he had sanctified his shovel to the sun or the moon. The youth replied that Rabbi Akiva did not need to worry, as the youth had sanctified it to the One Who had created them. Rabbi Akiva told the youth that his vows were valid.

The Mishnah taught that the law of valuation sometimes tended toward leniency, and at other times tended toward stringency. The law valued equally the handsomest and the ugliest men in the country, either one owed 50 selas.

The Mishnah taught that to secure a vow to the Temple, they seized property from the one who made the vow. But they let the one who made the vow keep food for 30 days, garments for 12 months, bed and bedding, shoes, and tefillin. If the one who made the vow was a craftsperson, they left two of every kind of tool. If the one who made the vow was a carpenter, they left two axes and two saws. Rabbi Eliezer said that if the one who made the vow was a farmer, they left a yoke of oxen. If the one who made the vow was a donkey-driver, they left a donkey.

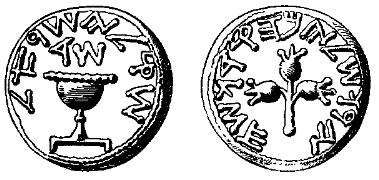
a silver shekel from Judaea at about 70 CE (illustration from the 1903 Encyclopaedia Biblica)

Comparing the redemption values for people between the ages of 20 and 60 in Leviticus 27:3–4 with the values for people aged 60 and older in Leviticus 27:7, the Gemara asked why an older woman retained a third of her adult value, but an older man did not retain even that much of his adult value. In response, the Gemara noted that Hezekiah said people say that an old man in the house is a burden, while an old woman in the house is a treasure.

Interpreting the instruction of Leviticus 27:8 that "according to the means of him that vowed shall the priest value him," the Mishnah taught that this was done according to the ability of the one who vowed. The Mishnah taught that if a poor person vowed to give the value of a rich person, the poor person would pay only the valuation for a poor person. But if a rich person vowed to give the value of a poor person, the rich person still had to pay the full value of a rich person. Citing Leviticus 27:8, the Gemara explained that the Merciful One made the obligation dependent upon the means of the one who vowed. The Tosefta taught that while the valuation of a rich man was 50 selas as stated in Leviticus 27:3, the valuation of a poor man was one sela.

Tractate Temurah in the Mishnah, Tosefta, and Babylonian Talmud interpreted the laws of substituting one sacrifice for another in Leviticus 27:1–33.

Tractates Terumot, Ma'aserot, and Ma'aser Sheni in the Mishnah, Tosefta, and Jerusalem Talmud interpreted the laws of tithes in Leviticus 27:30–33, Numbers 18:21–24, and Deuteronomy 14:22–29 and 26:12–14.

The Pirke De-Rabbi Eliezer taught that Jacob designated Levi as a tithe, holy to God, within the meaning of Leviticus 27:32. Jacob wished to ford the Jabbok and was detained there by an angel, who asked Jacob whether Jacob had not told God (in Genesis 28:22), "Of all that you shall give me I will surely give a tenth to You." So Jacob gave a tenth of all the cattle that he had brought from Paddan Aram. Jacob had brought some 5,500 animals, so his tithe came to 550 animals. Jacob again tried to ford the Jabbok but was hindered again. The angel once again asked Jacob whether Jacob had not told God (in Genesis 28:22), "Of all that you shall give me I will surely give a tenth to You." The angel noted that Jacob had sons and that Jacob had not given a tithe of them. So Jacob set aside the four firstborn sons (whom the law excluded from the tithe) of each of the four mothers, and eight sons remained. He began to count from Simeon, and included Benjamin, and continued the count from the beginning. And so Levi was reckoned as the tenth son, and thus the tithe, holy to God, as Leviticus 27:32 says, "The tenth shall be holy to the Lord." So the angel Michael descended and took Levi and brought him up before the Throne of Glory and told God that Levi was God's lot. And God blessed him, that the sons of Levi should minister on earth before God (as directed in Deuteronomy 10:8) like the ministering angels in Heaven.

== In medieval Jewish interpretation ==
The parashah is discussed in these medieval Jewish sources:

=== Leviticus chapter 26 ===
Baḥya ibn Paquda read Leviticus 26:3–12 to teach that God sends observable rewards for the fulfillment of observable duties. While for fulfillment of inner, hidden duties, God rewards with hidden rewards, that is, in the World To Come. And God's punishments for hidden and revealed misdeeds is similar. This can be seen in how God has guaranteed to God's people that for their visible service, God will give them visible and swift rewards in this world, as God explained in Leviticus 26:3–12, "If you will go in My ways ... ". Likewise, for visible sins, God sends visible punishment in this world, because most people understand only what is visible and not what is hidden, as Deuteronomy 29:28 says: "the hidden things belong to God, but the revealed things belong to us and to our children, forever." And Leviticus 20:4 says "if the people will turn their eyes away from the [evil] acts of this man and his family, I will turn My face to this man and his family." Hence, Baḥya taught, the reward and punishment for the fulfillment or transgression of the duties of the heart belongs to God, and consequently, Scripture omits an explanation of their reward and punishment in the World To Come. Reading Leviticus 26:11–12, "My soul shall not abhor you, and I ... will be your God, and you shall be My people," Baḥya found allusions to the proposition that pleasing God and drawing near to God are the greatest rewards.

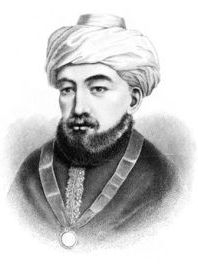
Moses Maimonides

Maimonides read Leviticus 26:21 to say, "If you walk with Me by chance, and will not hearken to Me; I will bring seven times more plagues on you according to your sins." Maimonides thus interpreted the verse to mean that if God punishes one with troubles, and one considers them as mere accidents, then God will send more serious punishments. Maimonides saw this expressed in Leviticus 26:27–28, which he read to say, "If you walk with Me by chance: then I will walk with you also in the fury of chance." For people's belief that their troubles are mere accidents will lead them to continue in their wrong actions and will prevent them from abandoning their evil ways. In a similar vein, Jeremiah 5:3 says, "You have stricken them, but they have not grieved." For this reason, God commanded us to pray to God, to entreat God, and to cry before God in time of trouble.

Baḥya ibn Paquda read Leviticus 26:41, "if their uncircumcised heart be humble and they accept their punishment," to teach that humility is called for when accepting God's judgment.

Baḥya ibn Paquda argued that evidence of God's existence can be found in Jews' position among the nations since the Exile began and Jews' condition in their midst, notwithstanding that Jews do not agree with them in belief or practice, as they well know. Even so, Jews' standard of living is close to theirs, and perhaps better. Baḥya argued that this is as God promised in Leviticus 26:44, "And yet for all that, when they are in the land of their enemies, I will not reject them neither will I abhor them, utterly to destroy them and to break my covenant with them for I am the Lord their God."

=== Leviticus chapter 27 ===
Maimonides considered the law concerning the exchange of a sacrifice as preventive, for if it were permitted to substitute a good animal for a bad one, people would substitute a bad animal for a good one and say that it was better than the original. Thus, Leviticus 27:9 sets forth the rule that if any such change took place, both the "original sacrifice and the exchange thereof should be holy." And Maimonides explained that the reason for the rule of Leviticus 27:13–15 that when a person redeemed a thing devoted to the Sanctuary, the person needed to add one fifth, was because people are usually selfish and naturally inclined to keep and save their property. The owner would therefore not take the necessary trouble in the interest of the Sanctuary and would not expose the property sufficiently to the valuer, and its true value would not be fixed. Therefore, the owner had to add one-fifth. Maimonides taught that these rules were laid down in order that people should not despise what was connected to the name of God, and which served as a means of approaching God.

== In modern interpretation ==
The parashah is discussed in these modern sources:

=== Leviticus chapters 25–27 ===
Jay Sklar identified the following chiastic structure in Leviticus 25–27:

A—laws about redemption (Leviticus 25)

B—blessings for covenant obedience and curses for covenant disobedience (Leviticus 26)

A'—laws about redemption (Leviticus 27)

=== Leviticus chapter 27 ===
Mary Douglas noted that while chapter 25 deals with person-to-person obligations, the release of slaves, their return to their homes, redemption of property, remission of secular debts, chapter 27 deals with the same topics from the point of view of debts to God. In Leviticus 27:24, God respected the jubilee law. And God allowed redemption of persons in Leviticus 27:2–8, of property in Leviticus 27:14–15, and animals in Leviticus 27:9–13. God, as a creditor, came under the power of the jubilee laws. God proved God's generosity by telling Moses the conditions under which persons, animals, or chattels that had been dedicated to God's service could be redeemed. Douglas also taught that chapter 27 serves a rhetorical function. Douglas saw in chapter 27 a ring composition in which the end of Leviticus returns to its beginning. Noting that Leviticus starts with the meats reserved for the priests at a sacrifice, Douglas pointed out that at the end, Leviticus is largely about consecrated things and the things that belong to God: blood, the priests, the land, and dedicated animals.

Leviticus 27:25 reports that a shekel equals 20 gerahs. This table translates units of weight used in the Bible:

Weight Measurements in the Bible
Unit	Texts	Ancient Equivalent	Modern Equivalent
gerah (גֵּרָה)	Exodus 30:13; Leviticus 27:25; Numbers 3:47; 18:16; Ezekiel 45:12	1/20 shekel	0.6 grams [ 0.021 ounces ];
bekah (בֶּקַע)	Genesis 24:22; Exodus 38:26	10 gerahs; half shekel	6 grams; 0.21 ounces
pim (פִים)	1 Samuel 13:21	2/3 shekel	8 grams; 0.28 ounces
shekel (שֶּׁקֶל)	Exodus 21:32; 30:13, 15, 24; 38:24, 25, 26, 29	20 gerahs; 2 bekahs	12 grams; 0.42 ounces
mina (maneh, מָּנֶה)	1 Kings 10:17; Ezekiel 45:12; Ezra 2:69; Nehemiah 7:70	50 shekels	0.6 kilograms; 1.3 pounds
talent (kikar, כִּכָּר)	Exodus 25:39; 37:24; 38:24, 25, 27, 29	3,000 shekels; 60 minas	36 kilograms; 79 pounds

Robert A. Oden taught the idea that spoils of holy war were devoted to God (חֵרֶם, cherem) evident in Leviticus 27:28–29, Numbers 18:14, and Deuteronomy 7:26 was revelatory of (1) as "to the victor belong the spoils," then since God owned the spoils, then God must have been the victor and not any human being, and (2) the sacred and religiously obligatory nature of holy war, as participants gained no booty as a motivation for participation.

== Commandments ==
According to Sefer ha-Chinuch, there are 7 positive and 5 negative commandments in the parashah:

- When one vows a person's value, to estimate the value as determined by the Torah
- Not to substitute another beast for one set apart for sacrifice
- The new animal, in addition to the substituted one, retains consecration.
- To estimate the value of consecrated animals
- To estimate the value of consecrated houses

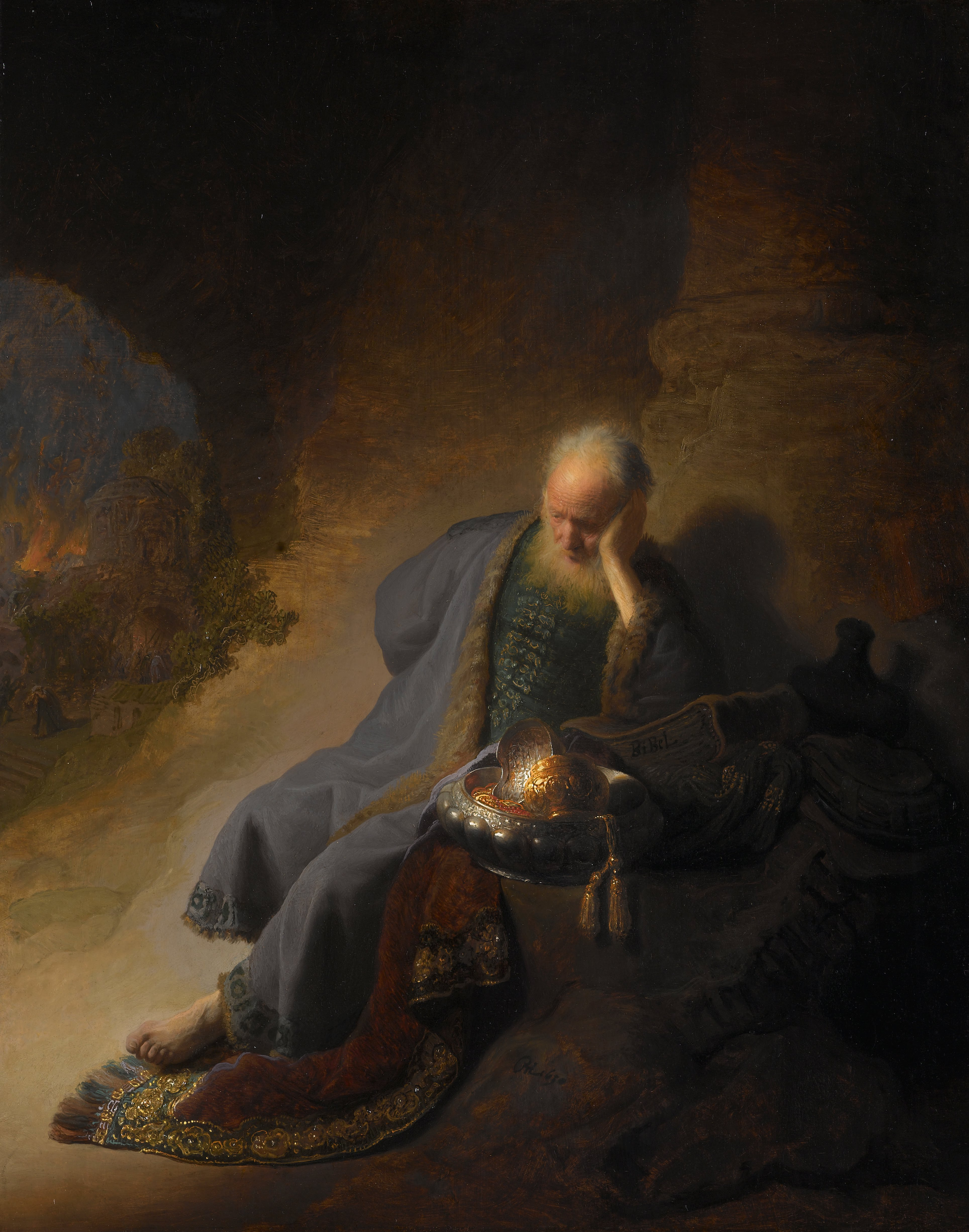
Jeremiah Lamenting the Destruction of Jerusalem (painting by Rembrandt)

- To estimate the value of consecrated fields
- Not to change consecrated animals from one type of offering to another
- To carry out the laws of interdicting possessions
- Not to sell interdicted possessions
- Not to redeem interdicted possessions
- To separate the tithe from animals every year
- Not to redeem the tithe

== Haftarah ==
The haftarah for the parashah is Jeremiah 16:19–17:14. The blessings and curses in Leviticus 26 are matched by a curse on "the man that trusts in man" in Jeremiah 17:5 and a blessing on "the man that trusts in the Lord" in Jeremiah 17:7.
