= Tokhachah =

The Hebrew word tokhaḥah (Hebrew: תּוֹכָחָה, plural תּוֹכָחֹת tōkhaḥōt) meaning chastisement, correction, admonition, rebuke or reproof, refers to the prescriptive practice of intervening in the incorrect or improper actions of others, an obligatory mitzvah in Judaism based on Leviticus 19:17. Vocalized slightly differently, tokheiḥah (Hebrew: תוֹכֵחָה) refers to a day of tokhaḥah occurring in consequence to transgressions.

The "Tokheiḥah" refers to the Torah reading of Leviticus 26:14–43, a section of parashat Bechukotai, the final portion of the Leviticus. The section specifies the consequences of failure by the people of Israel in following God's laws and keeping the divine commandments. This section is emphasized through contrast with the verses directly preceding it, which relate the blessings God will bestow if the people of Israel walk in God's ways and keep the commandments. Deuteronomy 28:15–68 has a similar series of curses proclaimed by Moses as the consequence of a failure by his people to follow God's laws and keep the commandments. Because of the distressing nature of the admonitions—terror, disease, warfare, famine and desolation—this section is traditionally read in a low voice in synagogue readings (but loud enough to be audible to the congregation). The Kitzur Shulchan Aruch of Rabbi Shlomo Ganzfried prescribed that the Tokheiḥah must always be read without a break, and that three verses before the admonitions and three verses after the admonitions, read in a normal, fully audible voice, must always be included in the reading. Thus the admonitions would always be accompanied by the message that God would remember his covenant with Abraham, Isaac and Jacob.
