= Glenn Cohen (psychologist) =

American-Israeli psychologist

- Born: October 26, 1964 (age 62); New York City, United States
- Education: Hebrew University of Jerusalem (B.A., Psychology and Geography); Bar-Ilan University (M.A., Clinical Psychology)
- Occupations: Psychologist; executive coach; speaker
- Known for: Debriefing October 7 hostages; Mossad Chief Operational Psychologist; E.L.I.T.E. method
- Website: www.glenn-cohen.com

Glenn Richard Cohen (born October 26, 1964) is an American-Israeli psychologist and former officer of the Mossad (Israel's national intelligence agency).

Following the Hamas attack on Israel of 7 October 2023, Cohen was designated as the first mental health professional to meet returning hostages upon their release, and subsequently led the team of psychologists that debriefed the hostages released from Gaza captivity between November 2023 and October 2025.

== Biography ==
Cohen was born and raised in New York City. He studied at Ramaz High School and was an avid basketball player. In 1982, he made aliya to Israel. After a year studying at Yeshiva, he enlisted in the Israel Defense Forces (IDF) in 1984.

=== Education ===
Cohen earned his undergraduate degree (B.A) in Psychology and Geography from The Hebrew University of Jerusalem, and his graduate degree (M.A) in Clinical Psychology from Bar-Ilan University, specializing in combat-related PTSD.

== Military and intelligence career ==
Cohen graduated from the Israeli Air Force flight academy and served for seven years as a search and rescue helicopter pilot. After his discharge, he was recruited by the Mossad where he served for 30 years, retiring as Chief Operational Psychologist. He retired from the Mossad in 2015.

== October 7 hostage crisis ==
Following the Hamas October 7 attack in 2023, Cohen was called up to serve in IDF emergency reserve duty in the Hostage Negotiation Unit, serving for over five months. He was the first psychologist to meet returning hostages as they crossed back into Israel.

Cohen authored the protocol for the psychological recovery and debriefing of returning hostages, and led the team that debriefed hostages released from Hamas captivity. He coined the term 'humanitarian intelligence' to describe an intelligence-gathering approach that centers on the trauma victim's wellbeing, contrasting it with existing US protocols that prioritize security debriefing immediately upon a hostage's return.

Cohen drew on lessons from the reception of Israeli POWs after the 1973 Yom Kippur War, noting that those POWs had described their treatment upon return as one of the worst aspects of their captivity experience.

Cohen has also written about post-traumatic growth (PTG), arguing that national trauma can serve as a catalyst for societal renewal.
