= Steven Haft =

American film producer

- Born: 1949 (age 76–77); Manhattan, New York City, U.S.
- Education: J.D. Hofstra University School of Law
- Occupations: Media executive Attorney; Film producer
- Spouse: Lisa Birnbach (divorced)
- Children: 3

Steven Haft is an American media executive, attorney and film producer.

== Biography ==
Haft was born in Manhattan and raised in Flushing, Queens, the son of Helen (née Urdang) and Nathan "Nuddy" Haft. He is a graduate of Hofstra University School of Law and is a member of the bar of the U. S. Supreme Court. After studying, Haft produced films for over 20 years including Jakob the Liar and Dead Poets Society.

In 2000, he accepted a position with AOL as vice president and chief strategy officer for its $1.2 billion in sales Interactive Marketing Group. He left AOL to found the media consultancy company Indyworks, which focuses on the impact of emerging technologies on media. His clients included Comcast Cable, the Corporation for Public Broadcasting, the College Television Network, AirMedia, Edelman and Burson-Marstellar. He is the senior vice president of innovation for the magazine publisher Time Inc.

== Philanthropy and civic service ==
Haft has been involved in environmental issues, human rights and arts in education since the 1970s. He sat on the board of United States' variant of the TerraMar Project, which was a United Nations NGO that promoted the Clean Oceans provision of the Sustainable Development Goals program, until TerraMar (US) announced that it had ended operations on July 12, 2019, after the sex trafficking charges against Jeffrey Epstein and Ghislaine Maxwell, became public.

Haft is an advisory board member of the Global Partnerships Forum, which acts as an intermediary linking business entities, government agencies and the United Nations to develop shared goals and efforts. He is an elected member of the Motion Picture Academy and a trustee emeritus of Robert Redford's Sundance Institute and was appointed by the New York mayor, Michael Bloomberg, to the board of the Brooklyn Navy Yard Corporation. He is vice chair of the Presidential Scholars Foundation, is a STEM advisor to the Center for the Study of The Presidency & Congress and has done work for the John D. Rockefeller III Fund, the John Hay Whitney Foundation, the United Automobile Workers and the American Civil Liberties Union. He was a co-founder of the original Earth Day in 1970.

== Personal life ==
He is divorced from the author Lisa Birnbach; they have three children, one of them being Sam Haft of the Living Tombstone. He attended the Modern Orthodox Jewish synagogue Congregation Kehilath Jeshurun in Manhattan.

== Filmography ==
He was a producer in all films unless otherwise noted.

=== Film ===
Year	Film	Credit
1987	Beyond Therapy	
1988	Mr. North	
1989	Dead Poets Society	
1993	Hocus Pocus	
1996	Last Dance	
1996	Emma	
1999	The Third Miracle	
1999	Jakob the Liar	
1999	The Bumblebee Flies Anyway	
2000	Beautiful Joe	
2000	Tigerland	
2003	The Singing Detective	
2004	Eulogy	
2007	Intervention	Executive producer
2017	Three Christs	Executive producer
2022	Hocus Pocus 2	

As writer

Year	Film
1996	Last Dance

=== Television ===
Year	Title	Credit	Notes
1983	Nightcap		
1985	The Recovery Room	Executive producer	Television pilot
1992	Stormy Weathers	Executive producer	Television film
1992	American Playhouse	Executive producer	
1994	The Spider and the Fly	Executive producer	Television film
1995	The Courtyard	Executive producer	Television film
1996	The Ultimate Lie	Executive producer	Television film
1997	A Match Made in Heaven	Executive producer	Television film
1998	Rear Window	Executive producer	Television film
1999	Pirates of Silicon Valley	Executive producer	Television film
1999	Strange Justice	Executive producer	Television film
2001	America Undercover	Executive producer	Documentary
2001	No Ordinary Baby	Executive producer	Television film
2002	Warning: Parental Advisory	Executive producer	Television film
2005	Making Your Fortune Online with Marsha Collier	Executive producer	Documentary
1995−2008	Mad TV	Co-executive producer	
