= Moses S. Margolies =

Rabbi Moshe sebulun Margolies
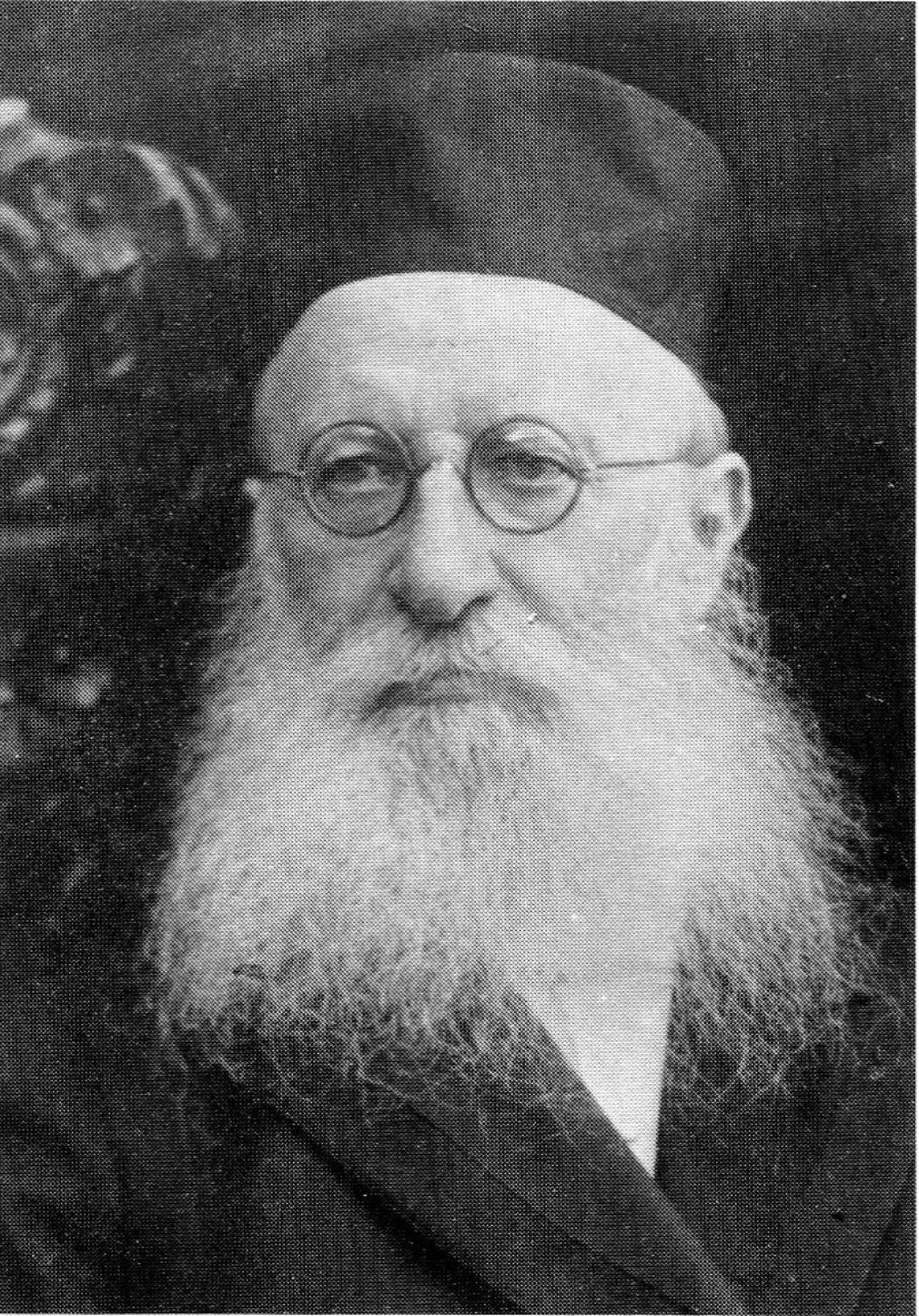

Personal life
- Born: April 1851 Kroza, Lithuania
- Died: August 25, 1936 (aged 85) Belmar, New Jersey, U.S.
- Children: 4

Religious life
- Religion: Judaism
- Denomination: Orthodox

Jewish leader
- Predecessor: Mordecai Kaplan
- Successor: Joseph Lookstein
- Synagogue: Kehilath Jeshurun (New York)
- Began: 1906
- Ended: 1936
- Yahrtzeit: 7 Elul 5696
- Semikhah: Rabbi Yomtov Lipman Heilpern

Moses Sebulun Margolies (April 1851 – August 25, 1936) (Hebrew: משה זבולן מרגליות) was a Russian-born American Orthodox who served as senior rabbi of Congregation Kehilath Jeshurun on the Upper East Side of the New York City borough of Manhattan. In its obituary, The New York Times described Margolies as the "dean of orthodox rabbis in North America," a "Zionist leader and Jewish educator."

== Early life ==
Margolies was born in Kroza, Russian Empire (now Kražiai, Lithuania) in April 1851 and received his rabbinical training at the yeshivas in Kroza and Białystok. He received semikha from Rabbi Yomtov Lipman Heilpern, the Oneg Yom Tov, around 1876. Shortly thereafter, he became the rabbi of Sloboda at age 26, serving there about a dozen years until he immigrated to the United States.

== American career ==
Margolies was summoned to Boston in 1889 to serve as the chief rabbi for that city's Orthodox Jewish community. Margolies held that position from seven years. He came to New York City in 1906 to serve as rabbi of Congregation Kehilath Jeshurun, described by The New York Times as "one of the largest and most influential Orthodox congregations in the country."

He was one of the founders of the Union of Orthodox Rabbis (Agudas Harrabonim) and served as the organization's honorary president.

As part of the anti-Nazi Boycott of 1933, Margolies rose from his sickbed to address the overflow crowd at Madison Square Garden on March 27, 1933, bringing the crowd of 20,000 to its feet with his prayers that the antisemitic persecution cease and that the hearts of Israel's enemies should be softened.

== Personal life ==
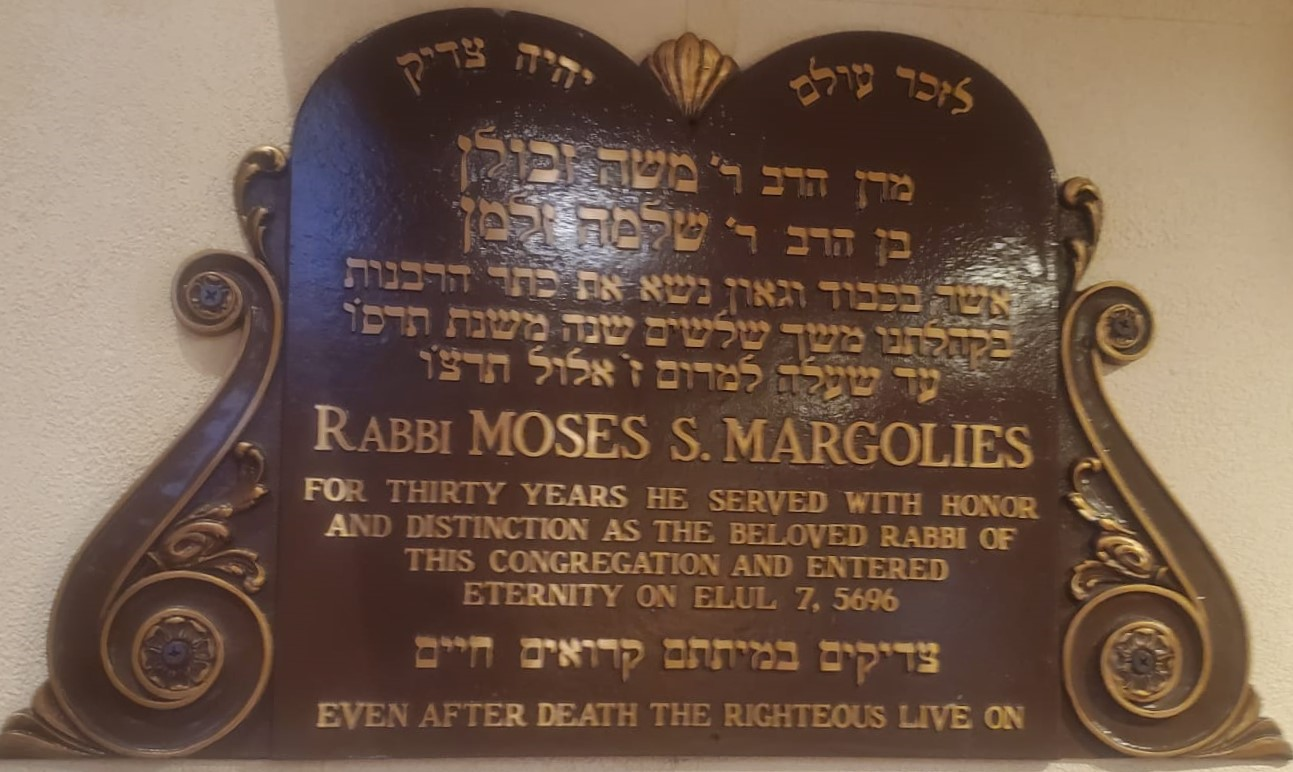
Plaque dedicated to Rabbi Moses S. Margolies at Congregation Kehilath Jeshurun

Margolies had four children — two sons, Hyman and Samuel, and two daughters, Ida Newman and Etta Schlang.

Etta, or Hadas in Hebrew, married Isadore Schlang and was the mother of the future Rebbetzin Gerdie Lookstein. She died in 1932.

Samuel Margolies, or Shlomo Zalman in Hebrew (1877-1917), followed his father into the rabbinate. He was the rabbi of Congregation Anshe Emeth in Cleveland, Ohio from 1904 to 1917, when he died in a car accident. During his time there, he founded, led, and promoted many Orthodox institutions, including the Union of Jewish Organizations, the Cleveland Kehillah, the Hebrew Institute, a kosher kitchen at Mount Sinai Hospital, the Yiddishe Velt newspaper, and Talmud Torah schools. He and his wife Rena Franks Margolies had two sons, Asher and Daniel. Architectural and art critic John Margolies was Asher's son.

=== Legacy ===
Margolies died at age 85 on August 25, 1936, at the Carlton Hotel in Belmar, New Jersey, with his wife and remaining two children at his bedside. Margolies had been the oldest living rabbi in America. He had been stricken with pneumonia a week before his death. Funeral ceremonies were to be held the following day at Congregation Kehilath Jeshurun.

His daughter Etta's son-in-law, Rabbi Joseph Lookstein, had served as assistant rabbi at the congregation since receiving his rabbinical ordination in 1926, and had filled in for Margolies during his prolonged illness. Lookstein became the congregation's senior rabbi following the death of Margolies.

Lookstein founded the Ramaz School in 1937, which was named in honor of Margolies, known by the acronym of "Rabbi Moshe Zevulun." Lookstein's son Haskel Lookstein, was a member of the school's inaugural class of six students. The Ramaz School had an enrollment of approximately 750 students in 1990, which had grown to 1,100 students in elementary through high school by 2007.
