= Synagogue Council of America =

The Synagogue Council of America was an American Jewish organization of synagogue and rabbinical associations, founded in 1926. The Council was an umbrella-body bridging the three primary religious movements within Judaism in the United States. It included:

- The Union of Orthodox Jewish Congregations of America (Orthodox)
- The Rabbinical Council of America (Orthodox)
- The United Synagogue of Conservative Judaism (Conservative)
- The Rabbinical Assembly (Conservative)
- The Union of American Hebrew Congregations (Reform)
- The Central Conference of American Rabbis (Reform)

The Council dissolved in 1994, facing financial difficulties and fractiousness among its members: the organization effectively collapsed after a proposal to relocate the council's offices from Manhattan to White Plains, New York (where it would have been housed in a Reform congregation) was rejected by Orthodox members of the organization. Rabbi Haskel Lookstein of the Orthodox Congregation Kehilath Jeshurun, the organization's final president, lamented the lack of "people who are really interested in maintaining the organization". Steven Bayme considers that the Council's collapse was symbolic of the general Orthodox drift to the right, and raised serious questions of how orthodoxy can cooperate with the broader Jewish community in areas of external protection, support for Israel and Jewish continuity.

The records of the organization are stored with the American Jewish Historical Society at the Center for Jewish History (CJH) in New York, which also maintains a history of the organization.

The North American Boards of Rabbis formed in 1999 as part of an effort at interdenominational cohesiveness in the Jewish community. The organization aimed to become a parent body for boards of rabbis in individual communities; its first president was Orthodox Rabbi Marc Schneier, then serving as president of the New York Board of Rabbis.

The Synagogue Council of America (SCA) was founded in 1926 by the congregational and rabbinical organizations of the major Jewish religious movements of American Jewry. The six bodies were:

- The United Synagogue of America
- The Rabbinical Assembly (Conservative)
- The Union of Orthodox Jewish Congregations
- The Rabbinical Council of America (Orthodox)
- The Union of American Hebrew Congregations
- The Central Conference of American Rabbis (Reform)

The presidents and officers, rabbis, rotated among the three movements. Later, the position of a lay chairman of the Board of Governors, appointed by the synagogal bodies, was established.

The original declaration of principles provided that the SCA seek those common concerns shared by all six constituent bodies. Thus, the SCA offered a central address for a diverse religious community that could achieve sufficient consensus to be able to speak literally with "one voice" to the larger world on vital issues. Since consensus was necessary for any action, position, and statement, the SCA did not address internal religious conflicts which often embroiled the religious community.

It is apparent that over the many decades, SCA leaders exercised great care and discipline to determine agendas in a way which avoided confrontations which would lead to the casting of a veto by one constituent because of a particular ideological or theological position. Indeed, the veto was resorted to only once or twice during the SCA's history. There was criticism of this arrangement by those who thought the purpose of the SCA was to adjudicate or at least reconcile the religious differences dividing the Jewish community. Not to be able to do so was viewed as "weakness" or "ineffectualness". But that was not SCA's mandate. This self-imposed restrictiveness accounted for the continued viability of the SCA, allowing it to develop into a full-fledged "church body" working with the other major church bodies in the USA and abroad, and with governmental agencies and the White House.

There have been other efforts to bring individual Conservative, Orthodox and Reform Jews together to address — collectively — internal Jewish religious issues of faith and practice. The parties failed to achieve consensus on such divisive issues as conversion, inter-marriage, and women’s participation in the synagogue service.

== Closing ==
The Synagogue Council of America closed its doors in 1994 after 68 years of existence due to a number of circumstances which combined to render the organization no longer viable, not least of which was the SCA’s inability to raise funds. The constituent agencies historically contributed less than 10% of its operating needs, the balance being produced each year through aggressive fundraising by the SCA itself. There was a diminution of interest in support and participation as the UOJCA, the US, and the UAHC increasingly wanted to establish their own denominational presence in interfaith exchanges and social action work with the very agencies the SCA related to in their names as well. Increasing religious divisions in Israel contributed to increased tensions among the denominations of American Jewry, making cooperation and consensus even more difficult to achieve within the Synagogue Council. The constituent bodies became increasingly driven by internal agendas, overcoming the historic commitment of each to achieve the consensus indispensable to preserving the organization and its program.

== Bibliography ==
The facts and figures contained in this report are on file with the LARGE CITY BUDGETING CONFERENCE (LCBC).

Rabbi Henry D. Michelman Executive Vice President, Synagogue Council from 1981 – 1992.
