= Mary Prince (nanny) =

Nanny for the daughter of US President Jimmy Carter (born 1946)

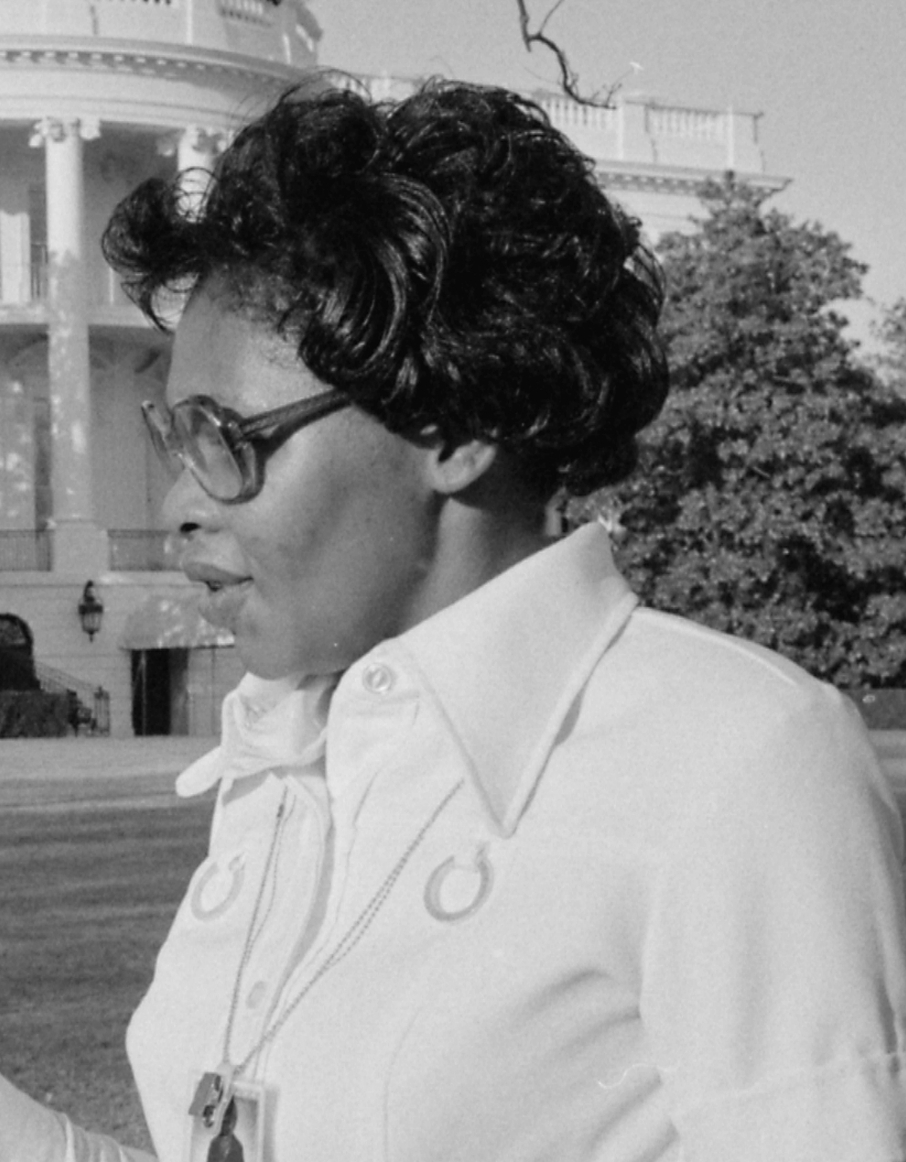
- Prince in 1977
- Born: 1946 (age 79–80); Richland, Georgia, U.S.
- Children: 2

Mary Prince (born 1946; also called by her married name Mary Fitzpatrick until officially separated from her husband in 1979) is an African American woman wrongly convicted of murder who then became the nanny for Amy Carter, the daughter of US President Jimmy Carter and his wife Rosalynn Carter, and was eventually granted a full pardon.

== Early life and family ==
She was born "in stark rural poverty" in 1946 in Richland, Georgia, the second of three sisters. She did not recall her father, and her mother and stepfather separated when she was aged about 9. Her older sister Carrie Francis died of a brain abscess when Mary was 12, after which she dropped out of school to look after her younger sister. She briefly married at age 14, and had her first son. A year later she began work as a domestic. She became pregnant with her second son in New York in 1964, before returning to Georgia in 1967, where she eventually became a cashier in a restaurant.

When she lived and worked in the White House, her sons stayed in an apartment in the working-class Washington suburb of Suitland, Maryland and were looked after by her sister during the day, while she took a taxi to take care of them in the evening before returning by taxi to the White House late at night to be up early for Amy. She officially separated from her husband in 1979, and changed her name back from Mary Fitzpatrick to Mary Prince. She is a devout Christian.

== Conviction for murder ==
She was sentenced to life imprisonment after being convicted of murdering another woman's boyfriend in April 1970 in Lumpkin, Georgia.

She and her cousin Aniemaude had gone into a bar in Lumpkin, and Aniemaude got into an argument. In 1977, Mary said: "I went outside and heard a shot. Aniemaude and this woman were fighting over Aniemaude's gun. I didn’t know anything about guns, but I tried to take it away and it went off. We didn't know it had hit anyone." Clare Crawford added: "The other woman, however, claimed that Mary seized the gun and deliberately fired it, killing the woman's boyfriend."

Prince was defended by a white court-appointed lawyer whom she first met on the day of the trial. In 1977, she said "I was under the impression I was pleading guilty to involuntary manslaughter, but it turned out to be murder." Jimmy Carter (in 2005) and Kate Andersen Brower (in 2015) both wrote that her lawyer advised her to plead guilty and promised a light sentence. Clare Crawford wrote in 1977 that "Her attorney says that he read the indictment to Mary before she made her plea". Prince said in 1977 that she saw her lawyer twice for 10 or 15 minutes and that she spent a total of less than an hour in court before receiving her life sentence.

Jimmy Carter said Prince was lucky the dead man was not white, as she would then have "likely" suffered the fate of Lena Baker, a black woman pardoned in 2005, 60 years after being executed by electric chair. Rosalynn Carter said that she was convicted because of the color of her skin.

== Nanny to Amy Carter ==
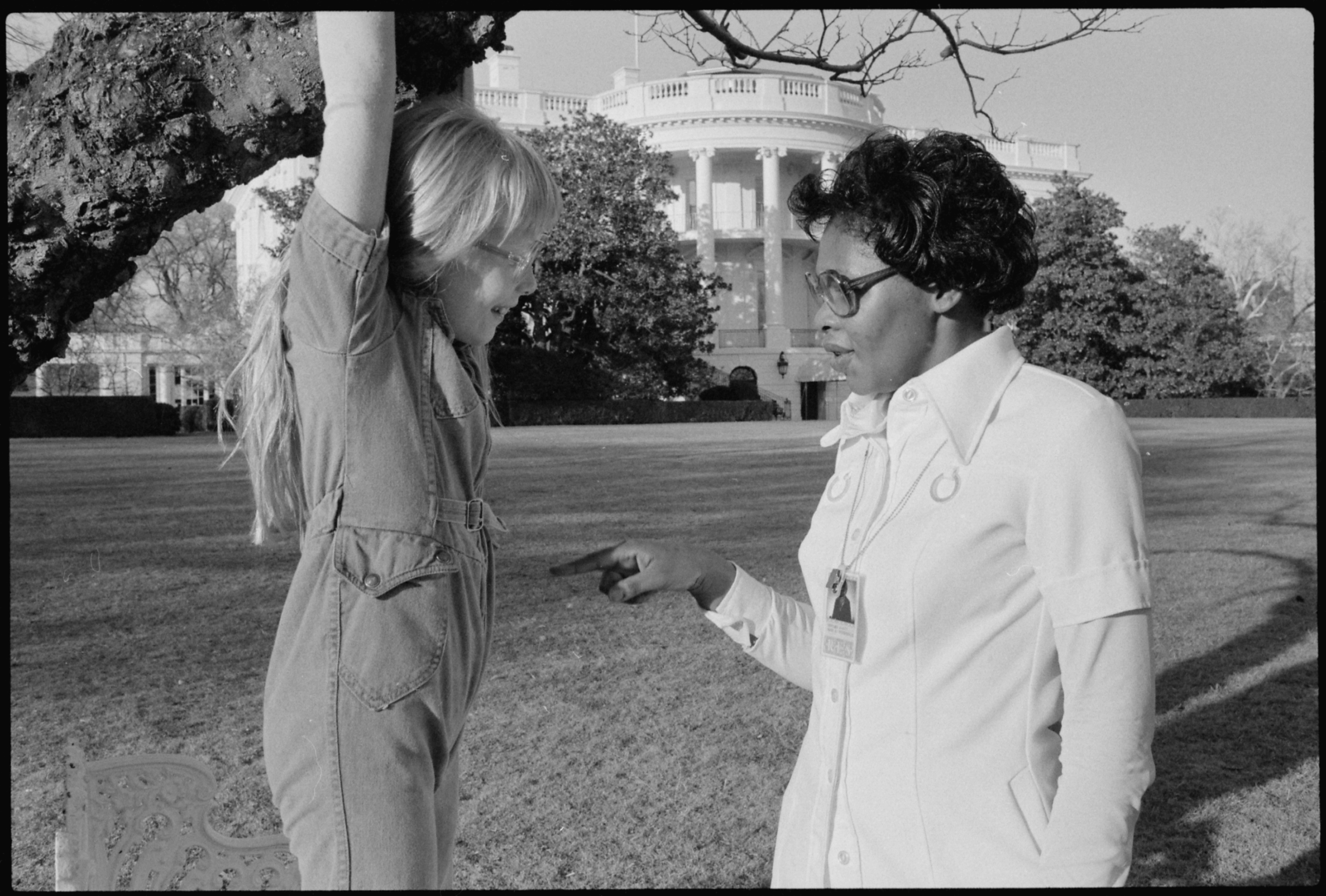
Amy Carter playing on the White House grounds with Mary Fitzpatrick in 1977

Prince became Amy's nanny in 1971 while Jimmy Carter was governor of Georgia and she was a trusty prisoner assigned to the governor's mansion, after being interviewed in December 1970 and chosen that month by Rosalynn Carter to look after Amy because Rosalynn was convinced of her innocence.

In 1975, when Jimmy Carter's term as governor ended, Prince was sent back to prison. However, in January 1977 she was able to travel to Washington for Carter's inauguration as U.S. president. Partly thanks to a letter to the parole board by First Lady Rosalynn Carter, and partly thanks to Jimmy Carter, who asked to be designated as her parole officer, Prince was reprieved, and was able to live and work at the White House for the four years of Carter's presidency.

== Pardon ==
Prince was granted a full pardon during the Carter administration, after "a reexamination of the evidence and trial proceedings by the original judge revealed that she was completely innocent".

== Later life ==
As of 2015, she lived near the Carters in Plains, Georgia, and saw them frequently. She sometimes babysat for their grandchildren.

== Media portrayal ==
When she was in the White House, her story was widely reported in the media, and some of the coverage was "not ... kind". The coverage included a skit on Saturday Night Live, with Amy played by Sissy Spacek, and Prince played by comedian Garrett Morris in drag.

== Legacy ==
Jimmy Carter dedicated his 2004 book, Sharing Good Times, to Prince, and discusses her in his 2005 book, Our Endangered Values: America's Moral Crisis, as an example of the dangers of racism and of the death penalty, saying that had the dead man been white, she would "likely" have been wrongfully executed like Lena Baker. Prince is also featured in the 2015 Kate Andersen Brower book The Residence: Inside the Private World of the White House.

Writer, convicted murderer, prison escapee and former Black Liberation Army member Assata Shakur, in her 1988 book Assata: An Autobiography, creates a critical portrait of Carter's relationship towards Mary Prince, comparing Carter's treatment of Mary as akin to that of a domestic slave and stating that this is a notable example of how the criminal justice system perpetuates Black and Third World people's enslavement.
