= Assata aka Joanne Chesimard =

- Film poster
- Directed by: Fred Baker
- Written by: Fred Baker
- Produced by: Fred Baker; Kat Roberts-Henry
- Starring: Assata Shakur
- Cinematography: Jato Smith
- Edited by: Tracy Utley
- Music by: Roy Hargrove
- Release date: February 1, 2008
- Running time: 93 minutes
- Country: United States
- Language: English

Assata aka Joanne Chesimard is a 2008 biographical film directed by Fred Baker. The film, premiering at the San Diego Black Film Festival, is a biography of Assata Shakur, a controversial member of the Black Liberation Army and US fugitive.

== Cast ==
- Will Blagrove: FBI Agent
- Rick Borgia: District Attorney
- J.D. Brown: Trooper Werner Foerster
- Kathleen Cleaver: Herself
- Pat Dempsey: James Harper (as Jack P. Dempsey)
- Lila Dupree: White Woman - Escape
- Charles Everett: Justin
- Omar Gonzalez: Fred Hampton Jr.
- Steven Hill: Sundiata Acoli
- Rosemari Mealy: Herself
- Bryant Pearson: Lead Escaper
- Robert Sciglimpaglia: Assistant Prosecuting Attorney
- Assata Shakur: Herself
- Char Sydney: Assata - as young woman
- Erika Vaughn: Asha
