= Assata: An Autobiography =

1988 memoir by Assata Shakur

- Author: Assata Shakur
- Language: English
- Genre: Autobiography
- Published: 1988; 38 years ago
- Publisher: Lawrence Hill Books
- Publication place: United States, Cuba
- Pages: 320 pp

Assata: An Autobiography is a 1988 autobiographical book by Assata Shakur. The book was written in Cuba where Shakur lived after being granted political asylum in 1984.

== Synopsis ==
The autobiography begins on May 2, 1973. Shakur recounts what happened after a shooting on the New Jersey State Turnpike. The shooting left Zayd Shakur and New Jersey State Trooper Werner Foerster killed, Assata Shakur wounded, and Sundiata Acoli on the run. The book continues with Shakur describing her early childhood growing up in Queens, New York, with her mother, and spending her summers in Wilmington, North Carolina, with her grandparents. Shakur tells her story by going back and forth between the "present" with Shakur's hospitalization, incarceration, pregnancy and trial following the events on the New Jersey State Turnpike; and the "past" with her early childhood schooling, the beginning of her radicalization, and her time as a prominent Black Power and human rights revolutionary.

=== "To My People" ===
"To My People" was a recorded statement released by Assata Shakur while in jail in Middlesex County, New Jersey. The tape was recorded on Independence Day, 1973, and was broadcast on numerous radio stations. Shakur includes the transcript of the recording in Chapter 3 of the autobiography. The recording was released in response to the media coverage about Shakur after the New Jersey Turnpike Shooting. In the recording, Shakur publicly described herself as a black revolutionary, her participation in the Black Liberation Army and her participation in the incident. In the message, Shakur describes the corruption of police, structural inequality between blacks and whites, and the American support of brutal wars and regimes in Cambodia, Vietnam, and South Africa.

== Chapter-by-chapter summary ==
=== Foreword ===
"Assata: An Autobiography" begins with forewords by political activist, philosopher, and author Angela Davis and lawyer, teacher, and author Lennox Hinds. Davis and Hinds were both participating in a benefit at Rutgers University in New Brunswick, New Jersey at the time that Shakur was awaiting trial for murder in the 1970s. Both Davis and Hinds served in the leadership of the National Alliance Against Racist and Political Repression.

In her foreword, Angela Davis discusses her involvement in the benefit at Rutgers University for campaigning to free political prisoners such as Shakur. While the event did not lead to Shakur's freedom, it was an impressive step in the right direction. Additionally, Davis explains Shakur's initial run-in with the state troopers on the New Jersey Turnpike in 1973 with acquaintances Zayd Shakur and Sundiata Acoli, then shares a similar experience. After the benefit at Rutgers, Davis notes that she, too, was signalled to stop by a cop car even though no violations occurred. Hinds was following close behind, and when he went to approach the police car, stating he was their lawyer, one of the officers pulled a gun on him. In this instant, Davis and Hinds were afraid to make any move, fearing that it would be misconstrued, just like what happened with Shakur, which left her with a murder charge and plenty more injustices during imprisonment. Lastly, Davis emphasizes the misinterpretations of Shakur and their various effects.

Lennox Hinds represented Shakur in a lawsuit against the New Jersey prison for the less-than-ideal conditions she endured throughout her time. In his foreword to this autobiography, Hinds notes that the first time they met was when she was in the hospital, handcuffed to her bed. He goes on to write about some contributing factors and prior engagements leading up to Shakur's fearful image before her encounter on the turnpike, most predominantly, her involvement with the Black Panther Party. Shakur was an outspoken Black woman who worked hard to fight for her brothers and sisters of the world, and throughout her autobiography, it is clear this is a personal piece; however, it is also a highly political text. Hinds categorizes Shakur alongside Martin Luther King Jr., because her presence and advocacy threatened the administration just like King's did. Lastly, Hinds makes it a point to emphasize the concerning and distorted experiences Shakur endured throughout her imprisonment for a wrongfully convicted crime because of her race.

These forewords by Davis and Hinds bring awareness to Black people's existence in society and the non-existent threat the police force imposed upon them during this period. Additionally, they highlight the lived experiences of Black individuals and emphasize that Shakur's story is not a one-off or a unique experience; these instances occur again and again, but there is no change in authority, and these racial injustices continue.

=== Chapters 1–4 ===
==== Chapter 1 ====
Shakur introduces herself as a Black revolutionary, describing herself as a Third World woman living in a First World country. She recounts the harrowing experience of being shot and the police killing her companion, Zayd, on the New Jersey Turnpike in 1973. Shakur regards her mistreatment at the hands of law enforcement as an instance of racism and prejudice, as she sees herself as being targeted simply for being Black. She recounts overhearing the police contemplate killing her, too. The ambulance arrives and she is dragged across the pavement into it. Once at the hospital, she recounts her feelings of it being inconsequential whether she lives or dies, as she is harassed by doctors and police. She feels fear as she finds herself in a hospital surrounded by white people. Despite her significant injuries, she is belittled and mocked for them and for her race by police and doctors. She is examined and fingerprinted, and they repeatedly ask her why she shot the trooper, but she does not respond as she mentally resolves to withstand their brutal treatment. Later in the chapter, she narrates the oppressive environment in which detectives continue to harass her for information; she ultimately remains resolute in her silence. The chapter closes with her trial and she faces a judge who reads to her the multiples charges against her.

==== Chapter 2 ====
Shakur discusses her childhood, looking back on her family and past experiences. Born JoAnne Deborah Byron in Jamaica, New York, to a divorced mother, she describes herself as a bright child. She reflects on her childhood by emphasizing how her grandparents instilled dignity and self-respect into her as core principles. Overall, Shakur highlights the racism of growing up as a Black girl in America and she emphasizes how her family's teachings related to the societal expectations of her.

==== Chapter 3 ====
In this chapter, Assata describes her transportation from Hospital to Jail. She describes her cell and furnishings and environment within her cell. On her first day, she is subject to the routine of prison as well as other prisoners and their habits. Later, Assata speaks with the Warden, who refers to Assata as Joanne, to discourage her from wanting to leave her cell, citing threats on her life. During her internment, Evelyn contacts multiple officials in law enforcement to petition on Assata’s behalf. Assata highlights that Nixon and other government officials should be criminally acknowledged, citing news and television painting the Black Liberation Army as a criminal organization. Assata goes on to describe her time in prison, including violence, issues with prison doctors, and other inmates. During the jury selection process, an issue arises with a juror providing a biased opinion on the case, causing issues within the court and resulting in a postponement.

==== Chapter 4 ====
Assata reflects on her life in middle school, focusing on courses and boys. In this she divulges her previous worries of how others perceived her. Further, she rejects a boy named Joe saying he was “black and ugly” which she immediately regretted. Assata then recounts her experiences exploring the world and discovery, to the dismay of her parents. She also explains how she went to Evelyn’s house when she first ran away. Later, she describes a robbery of a jewellery store she committed with Tina and Tina’s mother. After this, they celebrate at a bar and end up in a gang meeting, where the gang discussed an issue with a rival gang named “The Bishops”. She goes one to describe her confusion of Tyrone’s constant desire to fight, which leads her to reject an idea of being with him and taking his name.

=== Chapters 5–8 ===
==== Chapter 5 ====
This chapter involves Shakur’s transfer from Middlesex County Jail to Rikers Island and the horrid treatment she receives from the staff, while at the same time undergoing a legal battle regarding her alleged bank robbery case. It outlines the injustices of the judicial system, showcasing the judge’s inherent biases when dealing with Assata and Kamau’s case. Shakur meets a supportive group of women while imprisoned, and they are surprised to see that she is not “bigger, blacker, and uglier” like the media has portrayed her. This chapter also deals with the problem of incarceration and motherhood, as Assata and Kamau grow increasingly intimate in their solidarity, and when the two get kicked out of the courtroom they are assigned to a room by themselves where Shakur's child is conceived.

==== Chapter 6 ====
Shakur discusses a period in her late adolescence when she ran away from her mother’s house at age 13 to find work in Greenwich Village, encountering the harsh realities of living on the street. She finds work hustling men and working as a barmaid, quickly getting an up-close experience with racism and sexism in society. After working for and getting fired by (in the same day) a cafeteria owner who sexually harasses her, Shakur uses her day's pay to get a hotel room and subsequently meets Miss Shirley, a trans woman who befriends her. Shirley acts as Shakur's mentor for the remainder of her stay in Greenwich Village, showing her how to survive in the hostile streets. At the end of the chapter one of her aunt's friends sees her in the street and brings her back home, ending her stint of independence.

==== Chapter 7 ====
Shakur, after being acquitted in the bank robbery trial in the Southern District of New York, is sent back to New Jersey. In Morristown jail, she recalls friendly dealings with her friends, and continued harassment and racism from the prison guards. She recalls the fraudulent jury selection process, in which no Black people were selected. As the trial proceeds, she becomes increasingly worn out to the point of illness, and contemplates her deteriorating mental health. She eventually realizes that she is pregnant. At first no one believes her. The various doctors she speaks to tell her that she is suffering from an intestinal disease. She spends her days alone in her jail cell contrasting the misery and ugliness of the world, with the beautiful, exciting anticipation of having a baby, of being a mother. To conclude the chapter, she meets her new doctor, a man whom she feels reassured by. His name is Ernest Wyman Garret. Shakur's condition worsens, though, and Dr. Garrett realizes that she is in danger of miscarrying. A ruling is announced that she will be temporarily removed from the trial during her pregnancy, and Sundiata will be tried alone in the meantime.

==== Chapter 8 ====
This chapter follows Shakur living in Manhattan with her aunt, Evelyn, on 80th Street. She delights in the new neighbourhood, the people, the many stores, the sights, the museums, and her growing interest in art–despite her contempt for the snobs who treat her poorly at the galleries. She contemplates her contempt for the rich, and her naive feelings of money as a solution to problems. While living on 80th Street, she spends most her time on the stoop viewing the various happenings, the coming and going of people, the fights, the arguments. She tries to understand her feelings of excitement towards the "misery" and "malice" of this street. She describes the growing resentment she felt for one of her school teachers who discriminated against her for her music taste. She goes to an NAACP meeting in which she is unable to answer, to the organizers' satisfaction, a question about how to react if someone spits in her face while she is participating in a boycott. She branches off of her recollection of her time with Evelyn, and begins to write about how she has grown to understand the world, and how she has come to understand that injustice and racism are at the heart of America.

=== Chapters 9–12 ===
==== Chapter 9 ====
Chapter 9 describes Shakur’s pregnancy and the ways in which she is mistreated by prison and hospital staff during the birth, and while navigating the various medical complications she experiences throughout. After being determined pregnant at Roosevelt Hospital, she is returned to Rikers Island prison to suffer with minimal medical attention and little to no food that suits her new dietary needs. Her lawyers attempt to file for medical maltreatment but are thwarted by the malicious US judicial system which is determined to keep Shakur in inhumane conditions. When she goes into labour in September 1974, she is taken to Elmhurst Hospital where she is prohibited from receiving treatment from her chosen doctor. A demonstration is held outside while her doctor and lawyer fight for her right to choose who delivers her baby. In the meantime, Shakur declares she will deliver the baby herself, highlighting her strength in resisting oppression. Once the hospital eventually concedes to her demands, the baby is delivered with no complications but kept separated from Shakur for most of her hospital stay. Upon returning to the prison after a short recovery period, she is brutalized by a group of guards and unjustly thrown into the Punitive Segregation Area. The chapter concludes with the poem “Leftovers–What Is Left”, which draws attention to the struggle of perpetuating hope in a society that is built to destroy it. In this chapter, Shakur uses the depiction of the hardships she endures during her pregnancy to show how difficult it can be to maintain hope, but that it is always worth it when you are protecting the future for new life.

==== Chapter 10 ====
Chapter 10 shows the evolution of Shakur’s awareness of global issues and how this impacts her perception of her everyday life. When she is 17, Shakur quits school, moves out of her mother’s house, and gets a boring desk job. At first, she expresses excitement at being a part of a community and working for a great company, until she realizes how little the company cares for her as an individual. This marks one of the first moments in which she acknowledges society’s perception of her as nothing more than an instrument of capitalism. Shakur discusses a time in which one of her white colleagues brings up the riots of the 1960s and asks for her opinion after going on about how Black people were burning down their own neighbourhoods for nothing, to which Shakur helplessly agrees. The next time the topic comes up at work, she decides to express her true opinion, eventually resulting in her being fired. At this point, she begins to become more passionate about local and global issues, specifically when it comes to arguing with those who disagree. It is not until she makes friends with a few African men and embarrasses herself with her lack of knowledge surrounding the war with Vietnam, that she realizes she has never doubted the word of the United States government. This prompts her to begin doing her own research as well as cements her distrust in the government. As her perception evolves, she expresses feeling as if she does not fit in any one group, leading to her seeking opportunities to become more involved in her community. She gets a job at an employment agency and helps put together a conference to provide young Black college students with interviews for big corporations. Shakur is then saddened to realize that a great many students paid hundreds of dollars to be at this conference only for a select few to secure interviews. The chapter ends with the poem “Culture” which highlights Shakur’s distaste for the perpetuation of European culture as a result of colonialism. In this chapter, Shakur shows how her perception and interpretation of global events and issues has changed as she expands her knowledge base and begins conversing with others like her.

==== Chapter 11 ====
This chapter focuses on the accusation and unjust arrest of Assata Shakur. This chapter illustrates the quick escalation between her and the law. Assata becomes a victim of police brutality and an unfair judicial system in which she is ultimately accused of a Queen's bank robbery. Although she pleads not guilty and is returned to the workhouse, in a turn of events she, is then forced to wear the same clothes as the robber in the robbery she is accused of, and her photograph is superimposed over the original photo of the thief to convince the jury in her trial that she is guilty. However, before the first trial for the supposed bank robbery, she must undergo a trial for being accused of kidnapping of a known drug dealer for ransom, along with two others, in which the case is acquitted.

==== Chapter 12 ====
Here we see a new form of Assata who is evolving while attending a community college in Manhattan. As she is attending college she encounters many individuals whose ideals align with her political viewpoints. During her time at college, she takes a closer look at the history of oppression. Through her research, she finds that the institutions that are tasked with educating the general population have fallen short on educating the general public on the history of oppression. While engaging in research she learns of the prosecution of people of colour which fuels her desire to contribute to social change.

=== Chapter 13–16 ===
==== Chapter 13 ====
This chapter begins with Assata talking about the Murder of Martin Luther King. Throughout her autobiography she talks about prosecuting the individuals who are creating systematic injustice and bodily harm towards African Americans and a form of rebellion to ensue. She changes colleges and experiences more radicalization towards social change and the revolution for equality. She states that for things to change in this revolution white radicals, hippies, individuals of Mexican descent, African Americans, and individuals of Asian descent would have to join for real social change to be made. While working as an assistant to a doctor in Alcatraz she witnesses Indigenous people protesting. She comes to the realization that true history will never be taught or learned as the education system only remembers one type of history. She later seeks the Black Panther Party who she greatly admires.

==== Chapter 14 ====
Following her acquittal regarding the previous kidnapping charge, Assata is moved to the Manhattan Correctional Center, where she still experiences persecution but also reunites with former cellmates and experiences more freedom in the general population as opposed to being in isolation. She faces another trial regarding the case of her bank robbery and is worried about being convicted, but the case is surprisingly overturned and she is acquitted. However, right after this case she is sent back to Rikers Island and placed in solitary confinement once more.

==== Chapter 15 ====
Chapter 15 focuses on Shakur's journey as a member of the Black Panther Party (BPP). As she first walks down the streets of Harlem on her first day as a member, she is bright and electric, full of energy. It does not take her long, however, to understand that even within organizations that are focused on liberating and supporting Black communities, power is quick to inflate egos. Her work helping others, especially children, is fulfilling to her. It is in her moments of community work that Shakur finds the purpose and passion she longed for when she originally joined the party. She has goals to continue growing programs like this, however, political differences within the party quickly arise. As complications within and outside of the party becomes more apparent, Shakur understands that the best option for her is to leave the party that she once admired so deeply. Once she leaves, Shakur notices the increasing surveillance that authorities have implemented on her everyday life. An energy has shifted, and she can feel that something is happening that she cannot see. The chapter ends with Shakur being informed that the police are at her apartment, and she is warned not to go home.

==== Chapter 16 ====
After getting a warning that the Feds have been keeping close tabs on her movement and correspondences, Shakur decides to “go underground,” which she also describes as living a clandestine existence. At first, this experience did not require her to upheave her entire life, as all she needed to do was keep her interactions low and not draw attention to herself. While she lays low, she is informed by a friend that her image is plastered all over the news, with the media linking her to the death of a cop. Shakur understands that the police’s claim to only want her for questioning is most likely untrue. In order to avoid being detained, she goes deeper into hiding, cutting close ties to those that can be easily traced back to her. She later finds refuge with a friend with whom she doesn’t have any external links to. At the end of the chapter, Shakur dons a wig and a maid’s outfit as a disguise to board the train in the early morning. During her time on the train, she realizes that all around her are Black women heading somewhere, most likely to their jobs. Each and everyone one of them covers their natural hair with a wig, and Shakur discerns that surviving in America as a Black person means having to disguise and hide yourself. She hopes that this reality does not remain, and dreams of a free future for all who have to minimize themselves to fit a white standard.

=== Chapter 17–20 ===
==== Chapter 17 ====
Chapter 17 depicts Shakur's perception of the Black Liberation Army, including her own ideas for how the organization can become more effective as a revolutionary asset. She describes the Black Liberation Army as an organization without a single leader or chain of command. Rather, it is made up of various groups working towards a common goal. She discusses the idea of armed struggle and how it drives people to join movements. When reflecting on this, she emphasizes more scientific modes of action, meaning less action inspired by emotion alone and more attention on working toward common goals effectively. The groups must work strategically rather than through brute force or direct physical action. This is difficult and a common issue amongst the community as they are the ones often victimized by brutality and violence. She focuses on how the goals have changed to mobilizing Black masses.

==== Chapter 18 ====
After her acquittal in the Queens robbery case, Shakur is brought to Middlesex County Jail for men. While she spends a little over a year in solitary confinement during the Jersey trial, the National Conference of Black Lawyers and various members of the defense team file a civil suit against the state for the inhumane conditions of her solitary confinement. Although the conditions are ruled to be cruel, the state bypasses these claims to keep Shakur locked up. Following these events, Shakur's defense team struggles to find fitting lawyers and experts to help with the Jersey case; however, various student supporters volunteer to help. After the death of Stanley Cohen, Shakur's defense attorney, a large number of legal documents related to her case went missing. Evelyn discovers that these documents mysteriously ended up in the New York City Police Department but the majority was still not found. Shakur feels exhausted by the case, the biased jury, and the racist judge. Looking back at the trial, she claims it was incorrect and unprincipled to participate. She says that participating in the trial was partaking in her own oppression – "the only ones who can free us are ourselves."

==== Chapter 19 ====
Shakur is transferred to a Maximum Security Prison in Alderson, West Virginia – a prison for the most dangerous women in the country. Isolated from the rest of the world, she calls this prison the most brutal concentration camp in the country. Although Shakur does not get along with other prisoners, she meets Lolita Lebrón, one of the most respected political prisoners in the world. Although Shakur is a big supporter of Lolita’s views, they have minor disagreements over religion and politics. Shakur befriends a Catholic nun, Mary Alice, and learns about liberation theology in order to have intellectual conversations with Lolita. However, Shakur does not get the chance to follow through with this plan as the prison closes down and she is brought back to New Jersey again.

==== Chapter 20 ====
Within this chapter, Shakur's experience shows her grappling with navigating motherhood while incarcerated. She struggles on multiple fronts while being separated from her young daughter, Kakuya, and with her daughter viewing her as a stranger more than a parent. Further, Shakur accounts the difficulty of her daughter coming to terms with her absence, illustrating a multitude of complicated emotions when Kakuya believes Shakur can easily leave prison to be with her but simply chooses not to. This brief chapter contains broad insight into the pain that is inflicted on families through the prison industrial complex, as the separation of parents from their children hinders the growth and well-being of all parties involved. After this visit, Shakur vows to leave prison. The chapter ends with a poem dedicated to Kakuya. It describes Shakur's wish to be in her life, to see her joy and happiness, to have her go beyond all her expectations, and to inherit a world bigger than what she herself was afforded.

=== Chapter 21 and postscript ===
==== Chapter 21 ====
Shakur is visited by her grandmother, during which she discloses a vivid dream she had about Shakur. Shakur describes how her grandmother is well-known for her prophetic dreams—dreams which manifest in the real world. However, these dreams do not merely manifest spontaneously, but must be worked for. They operate simply as a guiding knowledge that leads one to partake in the experiences they are meant to encounter. Her grandmother explains that the content of her dream showed Shakur returning home, and after her return she bathes and dresses her. At first Shakur assumes she is a child in the dream, but upon finding that she is a grown adult she panics, thinking the dream’s prophecy is her death. Her grandmother assures her that she is alive and well, but is unable to elaborate on the complexities of the dream’s meaning. For Shakur, returning home means escaping state capture. She knows this reality cannot come to fruition with her waiting idly, and while she feels fear creeping in, she makes up her mind to leave. She scales her mental hurdles by chanting her belief in herself. The chants reinforce her confidence and allow her to remain steadfast in her mission to not forget the feeling of freedom. The chapter ends with Shakur speaking outside of prison, but the details regarding her escape are intentionally omitted.

==== Postscript ====
The postscript begins with Shakur reflecting on her freedom. She goes through a series of emotions beginning with elation and disbelief of how far she had come. These joyful feelings are then followed by somber ones as she reflects on the horrors that preceded her freedom from prison. She describes herself as overcome by emotions, ones she had spent so much time and effort suppressing while incarcerated. The chapter continues with Shakur reflecting on how far she has come in her ideals and opinions on revolution and her place within it. She then shifts the focus to her new life in Cuba. She compares her new life to her old one, and is left shocked by the lack of racism she experiences in Cuba, even going as far as saying that racism is a foreign concept to the locals. Shakur considers the anti-racist policies put in place by the Cuban government and reflects on the differences between those and the ways in which the United States attempts to combat racism. She compares how racism in America shapes the everyday lives of its citizens and how Cuba, lacking the same type of racism, is comparably much happier. The section concludes with Shakur calling home to her aunt. Her aunt is cold at first as she does not believe it is her, based on the many fake letters she's received from the police pretending to be Shakur. Once her aunt realizes it is truly her, she gets into contact with Shakur's mother and daughter and the four of them finally reconnect in Cuba. The book ends with Shakur, her mother, her aunt, and her daughter sharing stories and past experiences together in Cuba.

== Major themes ==
=== Oppression and resistance ===
Shakur describes the oppression she faced and witnessed throughout her life. The book begins with the physical abuse she received from New Jersey police officers in the hospital after the shooting on the Turnpike. She discusses the trials against her and describes them as completely fabricated. Along with the oppression from the state, she recounts the racism she, and her family experienced in North Carolina as well as watching the National Association for the Advancement of Colored People (NAACP) train people for peaceful protests and sit-ins. Shakur describes resistance methods taken by the NAACP, including the peaceful, non-violence ideology. Though she does not adopt this, she respects it. Shakur chooses to take on roles with the Black Panther Party and Black Liberation Army as forms of resistance to social oppression.

=== Revolution ===
Throughout the book Shakur describes her personal desire to be a revolutionary, and the social revolution she believes is necessary for African Americans and other minorities. She discusses this revolution many times, including in the “To My People” recording. The idea of revolution is also mentioned when she makes the opening statement at the New York State Supreme Court County of Kings during the trial against her, where she was accused of the kidnap of a drug dealer, for which she was acquitted.

=== Black Panther Party ===
In Chapter 13, Shakur describes her introduction into the Black Panther Party while visiting the Bay Area. She discusses her reservations about joining the party with the members which included their lack of politeness and respect for the people they talked to. Shakur eventually joins while living in New York. It is when she joins the party, she witnesses and experiences the Federal Bureau of Investigation infiltration of political organizations now known as COINTELPRO. It is this surveillance that leads her to choose to go "underground" and eventually leave the party.

== Critical reception ==
The New York Times' review stated: "The book's abrupt shifts in time can annoy after a while, as can the liberties she takes with spelling – court, America and Rockefeller, for example, become kourt, amerika and Rockafella. But, all in all, the author provides a spellbinding tale that evokes mixed feelings in the way the autobiographies of Malcolm X, Sonny Carson and Claude Brown did in years past."

== Legacy and influence ==
The book was first published in the United Kingdom by Zed Books in 1987. In 1999, an American edition was released by Lawrence Hill Books of Brooklyn, New York.

Rapper Common released "A Song for Assata" in 2000 after visiting Shakur in Cuba. The song details some of the events in the book.

The 2016 edition of the book features forewords by activist Angela Davis (written in 2000) and criminal justice scholar Lennox S. Hinds (written in 1988).

The book was adapted as an audio dramatization by BBC Radio 4 in July 2017.
