= Amy Carter =

Daughter of Jimmy Carter (born 1967)

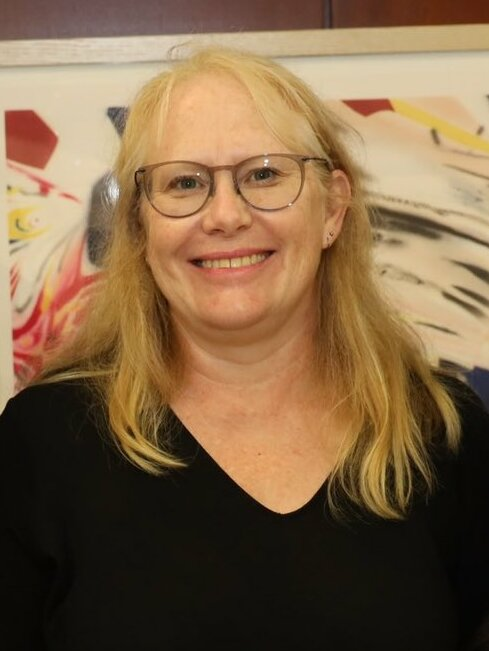
- Carter in 2023
- Born: Amy Lynn Carter; October 19, 1967 (age 58); Plains, Georgia, U.S.
- Education: Memphis College of Art (BFA); Tulane University (MA)
- Spouse: James Wentzel (m. 1996; div. 2005) John Kelly (m. 2007)
- Children: 2
- Parents: Jimmy Carter (father); Rosalynn Carter (mother)
- Relatives: Jack Carter (brother); Jason Carter (nephew); James Earl Carter Sr. (paternal grandfather); Lillian Gordy Carter (paternal grandmother); Hugh Carter Jr. (second cousin); Rockwell (third cousin); Redfoo (third cousin)

Amy Lynn Carter (born October 19, 1967) is the only daughter and fourth child of the 39th U.S. president Jimmy Carter and his wife Rosalynn Carter. Carter first entered the public spotlight as a child when she lived in the White House during her father's presidency.

== Early life ==
Amy Carter was born on October 19, 1967, in Plains, Georgia. Prior to her birth, the family held a vote whether their parents should try for a baby daughter. According to her brother: "The family voted a year before she was born on whether my parents ought to have a baby daughter, and a year later, there she was. We even picked out her name beforehand—out of a Webster's Dictionary." She was raised in Plains until her father was elected governor of Georgia in 1970 and her family moved into the Georgia Governor's Mansion in Atlanta. In 1976, when she was nine, her father was elected President of the United States, and the family moved to the White House. Carter attended public schools in Washington during her four years in the White House; first Stevens Elementary School and then Rose Hardy Middle School. After her father's presidency, Carter moved to Atlanta and spent her senior year of high school at Woodward Academy in College Park, Georgia. She was a Senate page during the 1982 summer session. Carter attended Brown University, where she was known for her activism against apartheid and the CIA. She was academically dismissed in 1987, "for failing to keep up with her coursework". Carter later earned a Bachelor of Fine Arts degree from the Memphis College of Art in 1991 and a master's degree in art history from Tulane University in New Orleans in 1996.

== Life in the White House ==
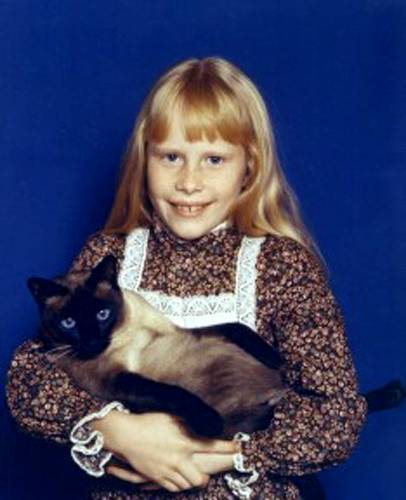
Carter with her pet cat in 1977

In January 1977, at the age of nine, Carter entered the White House, where she lived for four years. She was the subject of much media attention during this period. Young children had not lived in the White House since the early 1960s presidency of John F. Kennedy (and would not again do so after the Carter presidency until the inauguration of Bill Clinton, in January 1993, when Chelsea moved in.)

While Carter was in the White House, she had a Siamese cat named Misty Malarky Ying Yang, which was the last cat to occupy the White House until Socks, owned by Clinton. Carter also accepted an elephant from Sri Lanka; the animal was given to the National Zoo in Washington, D.C.

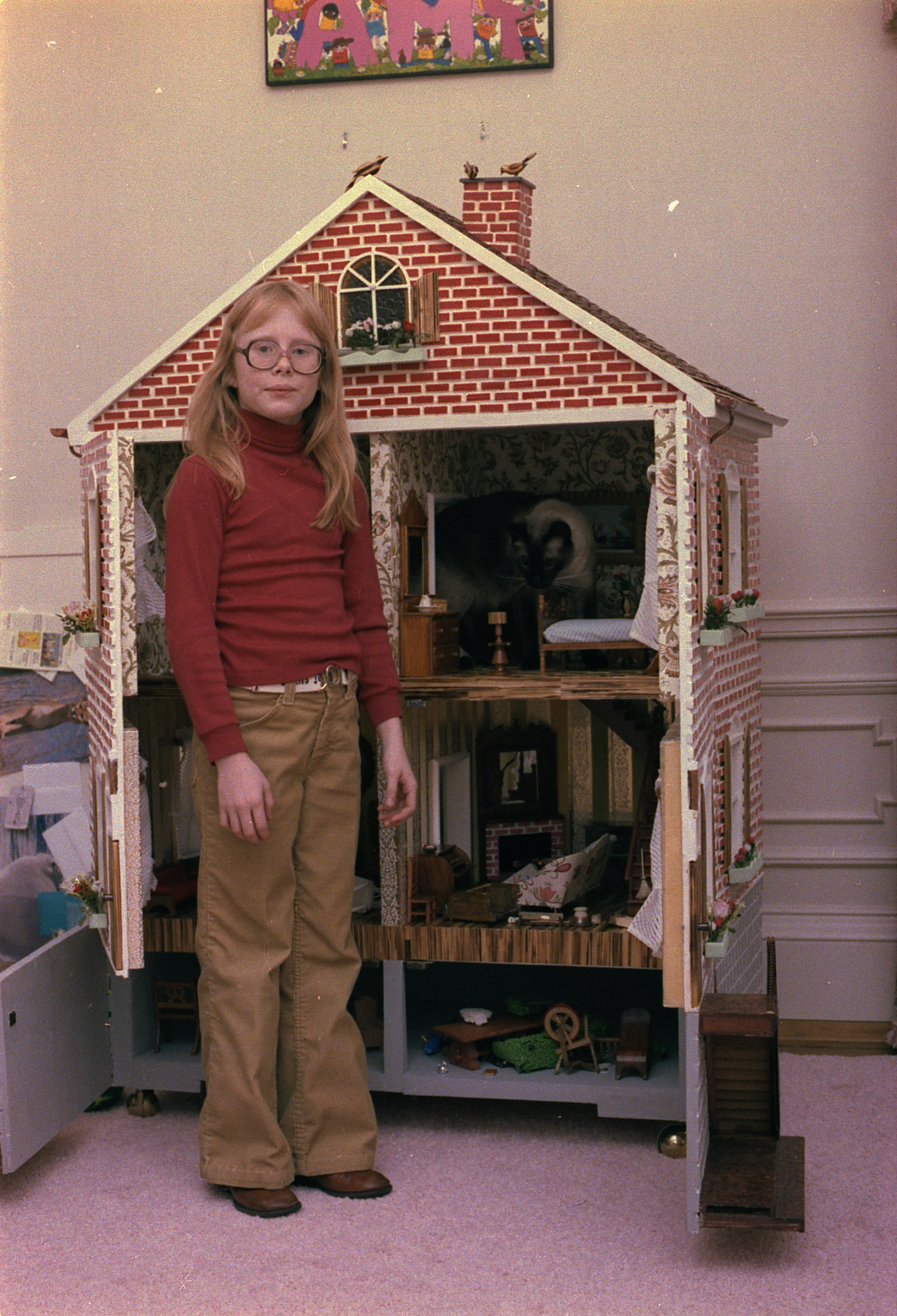
Carter pictured in the White House with her cat and dollhouse, 1978

Carter roller-skated through the White House's East Room and had a treehouse on the South Lawn. When she invited friends over for slumber parties in her tree house, Secret Service agents monitored the event from the ground.

Mary Prince (an African American woman wrongly convicted of murder, and later exonerated and pardoned) acted as her nanny for most of the period from 1971 until Jimmy Carter's presidency ended, having begun in that position through a prison release program in Georgia.

Carter did not receive the "hands off" treatment that most of the media later afforded to Chelsea Clinton. President Carter mentioned his daughter during a 1980 debate with Ronald Reagan, when he said he had asked her what the most important issue in that election was and she said, "the control of nuclear arms".

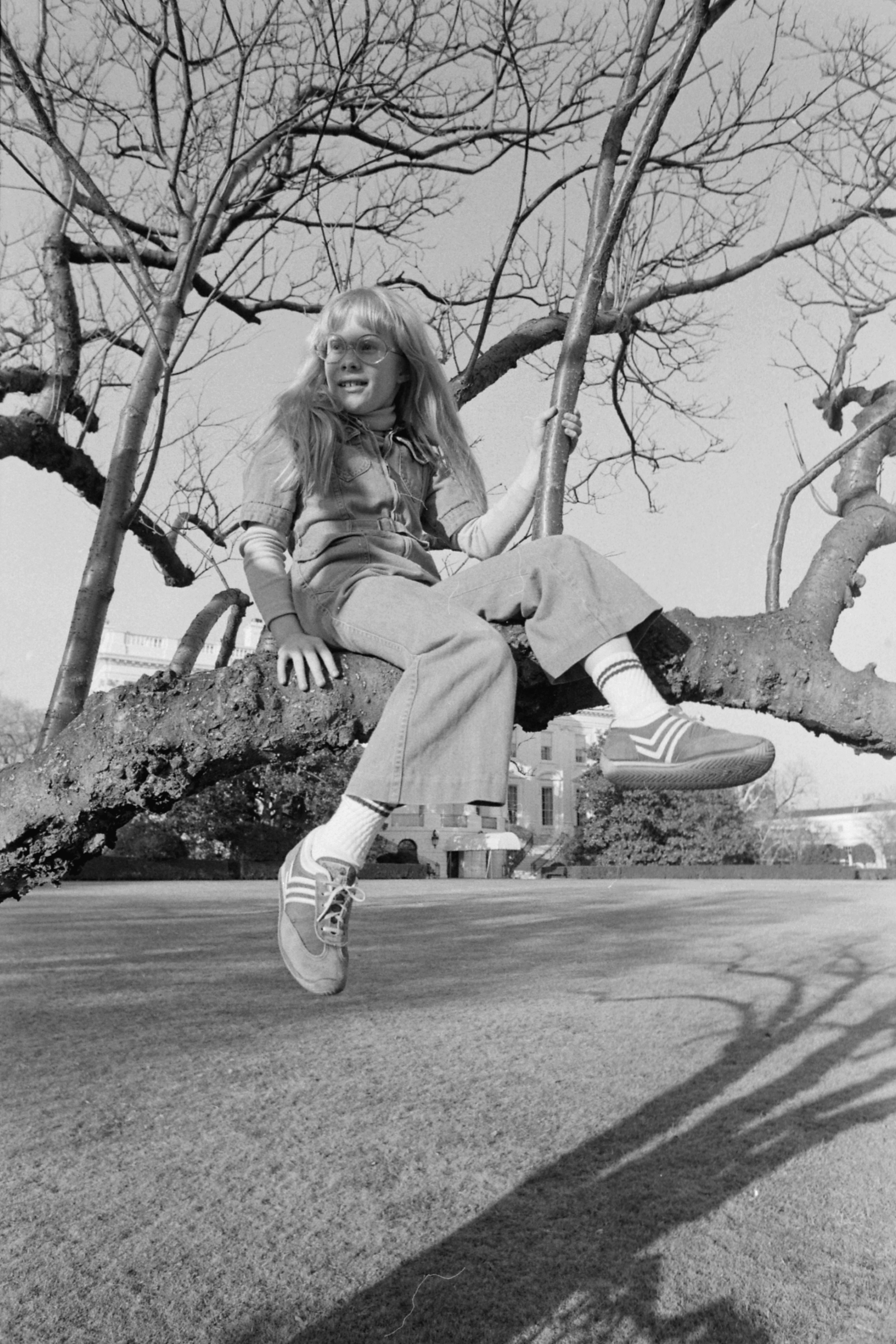
Carter playing in a tree at the White House in 1977

On February 21, 1977, during a White House state dinner for Canada's Prime Minister Pierre Trudeau, nine-year-old Amy was seen reading two books, Charlie and the Great Glass Elevator and The Story of the Gettysburg Address, while the formal toasts by her father and Trudeau were exchanged.

== Activism ==
Amy Carter later became known for her political activism. She participated in sit-ins and protests during the 1980s and early 1990s that were aimed at changing U.S. foreign policy towards South African apartheid and Central America. Along with activist Abbie Hoffman and 13 others, she was arrested, while still a Brown student, during a 1986 demonstration at the University of Massachusetts Amherst for protesting CIA recruitment there. She was acquitted of all charges in a well-publicized trial in Northampton, Massachusetts. Attorney Leonard Weinglass, who defended Hoffman in the Chicago Seven trial in the 1960s, utilized the necessity defense, successfully arguing that because the CIA was involved in criminal activity in Central America and other hotspots, preventing it from recruiting on campus was equivalent to trespassing in a burning building.

== Other work ==
Carter gave an interview on Late Night with David Letterman in 1982. She illustrated The Little Baby Snoogle-Fleejer, her father's book for children, published in 1995.

She is a member of the board of counselors of the Carter Center, established by her father, which advocates for human rights and diplomacy.

== Personal life ==
From 1996 to 2005, Carter was married to computer consultant James Gregory Wentzel. They have a son, Hugo James Wentzel, who in 2023 was featured on the second season of reality TV competition show Claim to Fame. Since 2007, she has been married to John Joseph "Jay" Kelly. They have a son.

== In popular culture ==
Little House on the Prairie actress Alison Arngrim impersonated Carter on the 1977 Laff Records comedy album Heeere's Amy.

== See also ==
- List of children of presidents of the United States
