= Joan Greenbaum =

American political economist and labor activist

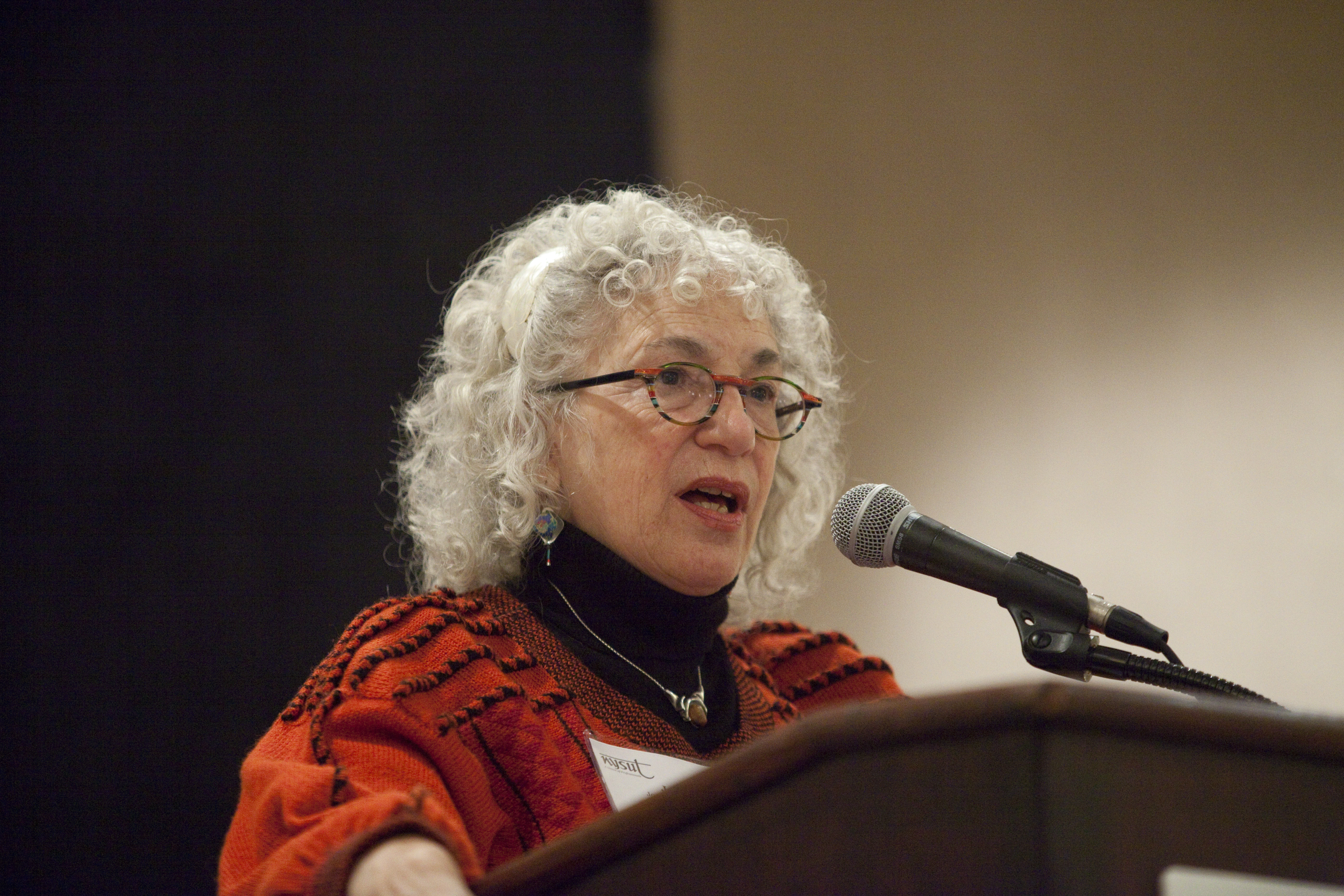
- Joan Greenbaum at the NYSUT Health and Safety Conference in 2013
- Born: October 7, 1942 (age 83); Bronx, NY, United States
- Education: Union Graduate College, Penn State
- Scientific career
- Fields: participatory design, labor studies, political economy, environmental psychology, automation
- Workplaces: City University of New York

Joan Greenbaum (born October 7, 1942) is an American political economist, labor activist, and Professor Emerita at the CUNY Graduate Center (Environmental Psychology) and LaGuardia Community College (Computer Systems Information). She also taught and conducted research at Aarhus University (Computer Science) (1986–88; 1991–92; 2007), and the University of Oslo (Informatics) (1995–96). Her numerous books and articles focus on participatory design of technology information systems, technology and workplace organization, and gender and technology.

== Personal life and education ==
Born to Harriet and Nathan Greenbaum in Bronx, NY, Greenbaum attended public schools in White Plains, NY. She earned a B.A. in economics at Penn State (1963) and a Ph.D. in Political Economy from Union Graduate School (1977), with coursework at the New School for Social Research and a scholarship from the Institute for Policy Studies. Greenbaum has four sons and several grandchildren.

== Technology ==
As an undergraduate student, Greenbaum programmed one of the first computers, the IBM 650, a vacuum tube computer system, in binary code. Following college, she worked as a computer programmer at IBM at a time when few women worked in computer systems. Greenbaum was the first woman faculty member in the Computer Systems Information Department (then called Data Processing) at LaGuardia Community College shortly after it was founded as a cooperative educational institution, making higher education accessible to local factory works and other laborers (1973-2007). More recently, she was a fellow at the research institute AI Now (2019-2020)

== Labor activism ==
Greenbaum is a longtime labor activist championing workers' rights and raising awareness of social justice issues. In the late 1960s-early 70s, she was an activist with Computer People for Peace, an organization of workers in the computer field who were against the War in Vietnam. She was active in early efforts to unionize computer workers, which she discussed in a 2019 interview with Logic magazine, and said:

"I believe everything starts with a single issue. You start with a single issue, and my issue was working conditions."

She is a member of the executive board of the Professional Staff Congress (PSC), the union that represents more than 30,000 faculty and staff at the City University of New York, and co-founded the Environmental Health and Safety Watchdogs. She was given the Unsung Hero Award at the New York State United Teachers (NYSUT) Health and Safety Conference in 2013.

== Participatory Design ==
Greenbaum's academic work has been most influential among scholars in the technology and design fields, specifically those working on participatory design of computer systems, which involves the active involvement of all stakeholders (e.g. employees, partners, customers, citizens, end users) in the design process to help ensure the result meets their needs and is usable. She collaborated with scholars in Scandinavia, where the concept of cooperative design took root and who developed strategies and techniques for workers to influence the design and use of computer applications at the workplace. Also in the area of participatory design, Greenbaum's work has been applied to studies of museums and cultural heritage institutions. Dagny Stuedahl, a professor in media design who has written about participatory design methods in museums in Norway, has been influenced by Greenbaum's focus on the organizational context for participation and involvement in processes that is central for the innovations in heritage institutions.

== Books ==
From her work with participatory design, Greenbaum wrote three books: In the Name of Efficiency (Temple University Press, 1979); Design at Work: Cooperative Design of Computer Systems (Erlbaum Press, 1991), which she co-authored with Morten Kyng; and Windows on the Workplace: Computers, Jobs, and the Organization of Office Work in the Late Twentieth Century (1995, Monthly Review Press) In the Name of Efficiency is considered a core text in the field of labor studies, while Design at Work, her most cited piece of work, remains one of the central publications in the field of information systems design and organizational change. Windows on the Workplace: captures stories of organizations and the people who work for them, focusing on the history of office technology in the 50 years prior to publication. The 2004 second edition was updated to include the use of the internet in offices. Of her work, John Bellamy Foster wrote, "Joan Greenbaum, who has conducted extensive research into high technology and the division of labor in office work...argues that "deskilling," though an important and fundamental strategy," often only lays "the groundwork for other devices in management's bag of tricks"

== Selected peer-reviewed articles and book chapters ==
- “The Head and the Heart : Using Gender Analysis to Study Social Construction of computer systems”, Computers and Society, ACM SIGCAS, July 1990
- "Return to the Garden of Eden? Learning, Working, and Living”, with Fischer, Gerhard & Frieder Nake, The Journal of the Learning Sciences, 9(4), Fall 2000, pp505–513.
- “Got Air”, with David Kotelchuck, Working USA, Fall 2003, Vol. 7, No. 2. reprinted in “Got Air: Indoor air quality in US offices”, with David Kotelchuck, in Vernon Mogensen, ed., Worker Safety Under Siege: Labor, Capital and the Politics of Workplace Safety (M.E. Sharpe, 2005).
- “Appropriating digital environments: (Re) constructing the physical through the digital”, in ReSearching a Digital Bauhaus, T. Binder, L. Malbom (eds). Springer Verlag, 2008.
- "Participation, the camel and the elephant of design", with Daria Loi, CoDesign, International Journal of Cocreation in Design and the Arts. Vol. 8, No 2-3 Sept 2012, Taylor & Francis.
- "Heritage: Having a Say", Chapter 2 with Finn Kensing, in The Handbook of Participatory Design, Keld Bodker, Jesper Simonsen, Toni Robertson, eds., Routledge 2012.

== Selected Keynote Addresses ==
- “The Design Challenge-Creating a Mosaic out of Chaos”, ACM Computer Human Interaction Conference (CHI), Denver, May 1995.
- "Creating a Sense of Place”, Information Technology, Transnational Democracy & Gender, Lulea, Sweden, 2003.
- “Social Inclusion & Exclusion in IT design”, International Federation for Information Processing (IFIP), Limerick, Ireland, July 2006.
- “Political Economy of Mobile Technology”, 30th International Labour Process Conference, Stockholm, Sweden, March 2012
