= Gloria Rolando =

Cuban filmmaker and screenwriter (born 1953)

- Born: Gloria Victoria Rolando Casamayor; 4 April 1953 (age 73); Havana, Cuba
- Education: University of Havana
- Occupations: Filmmaker; screenwriter

Gloria Victoria Rolando Casamayor, known as Gloria Rolando (born 4 April 1953), is a Cuban filmmaker and screenwriter. Her career as a director spans more than 35 years at the Cuban national film institute ICAIC, and she also heads Imágenes del Caribe, an independent film-making group. Her films, such as Reshipment (2014), characteristically document the history of people of the African diaspora.

== Biography ==
Born in Havana, Cuba, in 1953, Gloria Rolando attended Amadeo Roldan Conservatory, from where she graduated in music theory, piano, harmony, music history and musical notation, and in 1976 earned a B.A. degree in Art History from the University of Havana. She then began working as an assistant director at the Cuban Institute of Cinematographic Arts and Industry (ICAIC). She did postgraduate studies in Caribbean Literature, presenting her final paper, "Emigration, a Recurring Theme in Caribbean Literature", at Havana University in 1987.

Her documentaries take as their subject matter the history of the African diaspora in the Caribbean, using filmmaking as a way to preserve culture and spiritual values. Her first documentary, Oggun: An Eternal Presence (1991), which paid homage to those who have preserved the African Yoruba religion in Cuba, won the Premio de la Popularidad at the Festival de Video Mujer e Imagen in Ecuador in 1994, and Rolando went on to make more than a dozen other documentaries, winning several other awards.

Interviewed in 2014 when her film Reshipment was touring the US, Rolando said: "When we talk about the African diaspora, sometimes people don't know very much about what happened in the history of the Caribbean—and Cuba is a Caribbean island that shared many destinies with other Caribbean countries. Even if we speak Spanish and others speak French or English, we have many things in common. So I think that the expectation, the interest and the reaction that I see [in U.S. audiences] are because people want to know what happened with the rest of the blacks in the continent. ...Through my films, they get a little bit. I cannot cover in a documentary of one hour the whole complexity of the history of the Caribbean countries, of our history as black people. But at least people [can] get some elements that allow them to continue studying or [doing more] research, especially the young generation."

Among her best known works are Cuba, My Footsteps in Baraguá (1996), a history of the West Indian community in eastern Cuba, Eyes of The Rainbow (1997), a film about Assata Shakur, and a three-part series on the 1912 massacre of members of the Partido Independiente de Color (Independent Party of Color), entitled Breaking the Silence (2010). Rolando's most recent documentary, Dialog with My Grandmother (2016), is based on a 1993 conversation she had with her grandmother, Inocencia Leonarda Armas y Abre.

Rolando heads an independent film-making group, Imágenes del Caribe, based in Havana. They are currently producing a documentary on the Oblate Sisters of Providence, the first Black Catholic religious order in the United States.

== Selected filmography ==
- 1991: Oggun: An Eternal Present
- 1996: My Footsteps in Baraguá
- 1997: Eyes of the Rainbow/Ojos del arco iris
- 2000: El Alacrán / The Scorpion
- 2001: Raices de Mi Corazon/Roots of My Heart
- 2003: Los Marqueses de Atarés
- 2004: Nosotros y el Jazz / The Jazz in Us
- 2007: Pasajes Del Corazón y La Memoria (Historias de Cubanos y Caimaneros). English: Cherished Island Memories
- 2010: 1912: Breaking the Silence Chapter 1 / 1912, Voces para un Silencio, Capitulo 1
- 2011: 1912: Breaking the Silence, Chapter 2 / 1912, Voces para un Silencio, Capitulo 2
- 2012: 1912: Breaking the Silence, Capitulo 3 / 1912, Voces para un Silencio, Capitulo 3
- 2014: Reembarque / Reshipment
- 2016: Dialogo con mi abuela/Dialog with My Grandmother

== Selected awards ==
- 1994: Premio de la Popularidad at the Festival de Video Mujer e Imagen in Ecuador for Oggun: An Eternal Present
- 2000: Distinción "Gitana Tropical", from Dirección Provincial de Cultura de la Ciudad de la Habana.
- 2000: Diploma "Al Mérito Artístico", from Ministerio de Cultura y el Ministro de Educación Superior, Cuba.
- 2009: Medalla Federico Fellini from UNESCO to Gloria Rolando as director
- 2010: Sara Gómez Prize for Pasajes del corazon y la memoria (2007), from the Consejo Nacional de Casas de Cultura (Havana) at the 30th Festival Internacional del Nuevo Cine Latinoamericano.
- 2012: Walterio Carbonell Prize for the series 1912, Voces para un silencio
- 2013: Caracol Prize (director category) from UNEAC for 1912, Voces para un silencio
- 2016: Caracol Prize (documentary category) from UNEAC for Dialogo con mi abuela
- Dialogo con mi abuela nominated for Best Short Documentary, Pan African Film Festival, Los Angeles, 2017
