= Eyes of the Rainbow =

1997 film by Gloria Rolando about Assata Shakur

Eyes of The Rainbow is a 1997 documentary film by Gloria Rolando about Assata Shakur. The film was recorded in Cuba 33 years after Shakur's exile. The film consists primarily of a personal interview with Assata herself on the day her mother died as she recounts her experience as a prisoner in the United States. She reflects on the abuses she suffered as an inmate and the night she escaped from the correctional facility. The film encompasses the African Spirit Oya to illustrate the struggles Shakur has faced as a revolutionary. In the video Shakur talks about her life in Cuba, the influence of her grandmother as well as Afro-Cuban ancestry as a result of the African Diaspora.
