= Computer People for Peace =

American left-wing political organization

- Abbreviation: CPP
- Formation: 1968; 58 years ago
- Dissolved: 1974; 52 years ago
- Headquarters: New York City, New York, United States
- Members: 200 at the most

The Computer People for Peace (CPP) was an activist organization active in the technology industry from 1968 to 1974.

The CPP had its roots in the anti-war movement of the 60s. Its founders included Joan Greenbaum. Outside the anti-war movement, CPP was against “the use of computer information systems as a means of social control”, “corporate racism” and “the role of automation on rising unemployment.”, among other issues. They intermittently published a newsletter called "Interrupt" until at least March 1973.

In 1969, they posted bail for one of the Panther 21, Sundiata Acoli, in NYC.

In 1972, Computer People for Peace addressed Congress about the need to protect citizens from the potential misuse of computer technology.
