= National Conference of Black Lawyers =

U.S. professional association

The National Conference of Black Lawyers (NCBL) is an American association, formed in 1968, to offer legal assistance to black civil rights activists, it is made up of judges, law students, lawyers, legal activists, legal workers, and scholars.

Noted clients included Angela Davis, Assata Shakur, the Attica Brothers, Geronimo Pratt, Mumia Abu-Jamal, the Ben Chavis and the Wilmington Ten. The organization lobbied against apartheid in South Africa.

They expanded from African-American oppression to help other groups in countries like: Northern Ireland, the Palestinian territories, Cuba, Nicaragua, Guyana, Grenada, and throughout Southern Africa.

The group's mission is: "To protect human rights, to achieve self-determination of Africa and African Communities and to work in coalition to assist in ending oppression of all peoples."
