= Assata Shakur =

American political activist (1947–2025)

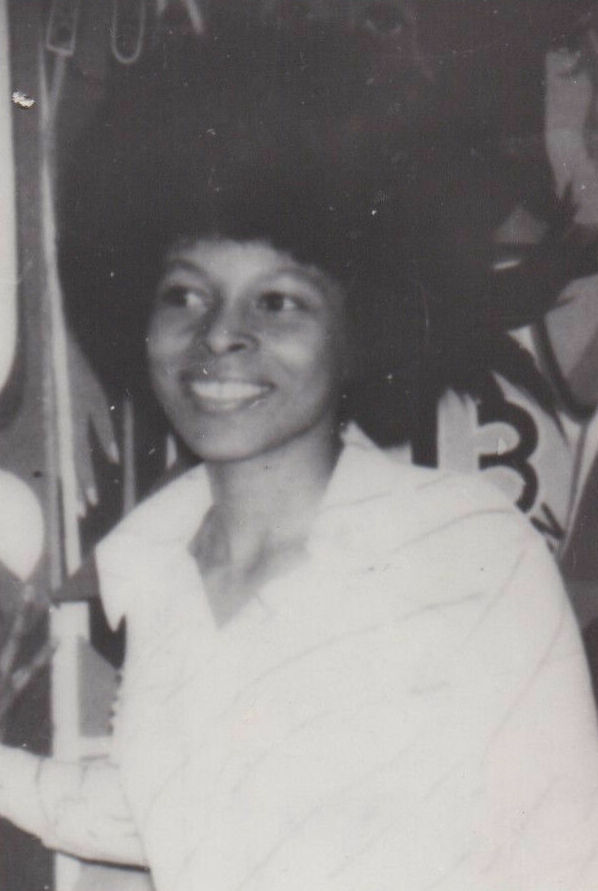
- Shakur in the 1970s
- Born: JoAnne Deborah Byron; July 16, 1947 (Note: The Federal Bureau of Investigation notes that Shakur also used August 19, 1952, as her birthdate.); New York City, New York, U.S.
- Died: September 25, 2025 (aged 78); Havana, Cuba
- Other name: JoAnne Chesimard
- Occupation: Political activist
- Known for: Black Liberation Army and subsequent exile in Cuba; first woman added to FBI Most Wanted Terrorists list; godmother of Tupac Shakur
- Notable work: Assata: An Autobiography
- Spouse: Louis Chesimard (m. 1967; div. 1970)
- Children: 1
- Allegiance: Black Panther Party (1970); Black Liberation Army (1971–1981)
- Convictions: First degree murder; Atrocious assault and battery; Assault and battery against a police officer; Assault with a dangerous weapon; Assault with intent to kill; Illegal possession of a weapon
- Penalty: Life imprisonment
- Escaped: November 2, 1979
- Escape end: Never captured; remained a fugitive for 45 years, 327 days after her escape.

Assata Olugbala Shakur (/əˈsɑːtə ʃəˈkʊər/ ə-SAH-tə shə-KOOR; born JoAnne Deborah Byron, July 16, 1947 – September 25, 2025) was a Black American political activist, revolutionary, and fugitive who was a member of the Black Panther Party, and later the Black Liberation Army. In 1977, she was convicted of the first-degree murder of New Jersey State Trooper Werner Foerster during a shootout on the New Jersey Turnpike in 1973. She escaped from prison in 1979 and was wanted by the FBI, with a $1 million reward for information leading to her capture, and an additional $1 million reward offered by the New Jersey attorney general. She was never caught and remained a fugitive for 45 years.

Born in Flushing, Queens, Shakur grew up in New York City and Wilmington, North Carolina. After running away from home several times, she was taken in by an aunt, who later acted as one of her lawyers. Shakur became involved in political activism while attending the Borough of Manhattan Community College and the City College of New York. After graduation, she adopted the name Assata Shakur and briefly joined the Black Panther Party before becoming a member of the BLA.

Between 1971 and 1973, Shakur was charged with several crimes, leading to a multi-state manhunt. On May 2, 1973, Shakur, along with BLA members Zayd Malik Shakur and Sundiata Acoli, were stopped on the New Jersey Turnpike. The incident escalated into a shootout with State Troopers Werner Foerster and James Harper. Foerster was killed and Harper was wounded; Zayd Shakur was killed, and both Assata Shakur and Acoli were wounded. At her 1977 trial, Shakur was convicted on multiple charges, including the murder of Foerster and the assault of Harper, and was sentenced to life plus 26 to 33 years in prison. Shakur maintained that she could not have fired the shots that wounded Harper and killed Foerster, as her right arm had been injured by police gunfire early in the confrontation.

While serving her sentence at the Clinton Correctional Facility for Women in New Jersey, Shakur escaped in 1979 with the assistance of members of the BLA and the May 19th Communist Organization. She was granted political asylum in Cuba in 1984, where she resided for the remainder of her life despite ongoing efforts by the U.S. government to secure her extradition. In 2013, the FBI added her to its FBI Most Wanted Terrorists list under the name Joanne Deborah Chesimard, making her the first woman to be listed. Shakur died on September 25, 2025, at the age of 78, according to the Cuban Foreign Ministry.

== Early life and education ==
Assata Shakur was born JoAnne Deborah Byron, in Flushing, Queens, on July 16, 1947. She lived for three years with her mother, schoolteacher Doris E. Johnson, and retired grandparents, Lula and Frank Hill.

In 1950, Shakur's parents divorced, and she moved with her grandparents to Wilmington, North Carolina. After elementary school, Shakur moved back to Queens to live with her mother and stepfather (her mother had remarried); she attended Parsons Junior High School. Shakur still frequently visited her grandparents in the South. Her family struggled financially and argued frequently; Shakur spent little time at home.

She often ran away, staying with strangers and working for short periods of time, until she was taken in by her mother's sister, Evelyn A. Williams, a civil rights worker who lived in Manhattan. Shakur called her Aunt Evelyn the heroine of her childhood, as she was constantly introducing her to new areas of knowledge. She said her aunt was "very sophisticated and knew all kinds of things. She was right up my alley because i [sic] was forever asking all kinds of questions. I wanted to know everything. She would give me a book and say, 'Read this,' and i would eat up that book like it was ice cream." Williams often took her niece to museums, theaters, and art galleries.

Shakur converted to Catholicism as a child and attended the all-girls Cathedral High School for six months before transferring to public high school, which she attended for a while before dropping out. Her aunt helped her to later earn a General Educational Development (GED) degree.

Shakur later wrote that teachers seemed surprised when she answered a question in class, as if not expecting black people to be intelligent and engaged. She said she was taught a sugar-coated version of history that ignored the oppression suffered by people of color, especially in the United States. In her autobiography, she wrote: "I didn't know what a fool they had made out of me until i grew up and started to read real history."

Shakur attended Borough of Manhattan Community College (BMCC) and then the City College of New York (CCNY) in the mid-1960s, where she became involved in many political activities, civil rights protests, and sit-ins.

She traced her interest in communism to a 1964 debate about the Vietnam War with several African students attending Columbia University:

I continued saying the first thing that came into my head: that the U.S. was fighting communists because they wanted to take over everything. When someone asked me what communism was, i opened my mouth to answer, then realized i didn't have the faintest idea. My image of a communist came from a cartoon. It was a spy with a black trench coat and a black hat pulled down over his face, slinking around corners.... I felt like a bona fide clown.... I knew i didn't know what the hell communism was, and yet i'd been dead set against it.... I never forgot that day.... Only a fool lets somebody else tell him who his enemy is.

In 1967, she was arrested for the first time — with 100 other BMCC students — on charges of trespassing. The students had chained and locked the entrance to a college building to protest the low numbers of black faculty and the lack of a Black Studies program.

== Black Panther Party and Black Liberation Army ==
After attending CCNY, Shakur moved to Oakland, California, where she joined the Black Panther Party (BPP), and worked to organize protests and community education programs. After returning to New York City, she led the BPP chapter in Harlem, coordinating the Free Breakfast for Children program, free clinics, and community outreach. But she soon left the party, disliking the macho behavior of the men and believing that the BPP members and leaders lacked knowledge and understanding of African-American history.

Shakur joined the Black Liberation Army (BLA), an offshoot whose members were inspired by the Vietcong and the Algerian National Liberation Front. They mounted a campaign of guerilla activities against the U.S. government, using such tactics as planting bombs, holding up banks, and murdering drug dealers and police.

She began using the name Assata Olugbala Shakur in 1971, rejecting JoAnne Chesimard as a "slave name". Assata is a West African name, derived from Aisha, said to mean "she who struggles", while Shakur means "thankful one" in Arabic. Olugbala means "savior" in Yoruba. She identified as an African and felt her old name no longer fit: "It sounded so strange when people called me JoAnne. It really had nothing to do with me. I didn't feel like no JoAnne, or no Negro, or no amerikan. I felt like an African woman."

== Allegations and manhunt ==
On April 6, 1971, Shakur was shot in the stomach during a struggle with a guest at the Statler Hilton Hotel in Midtown Manhattan. According to police, Shakur knocked on the door of a guest's room, asked "Is there a party going on here?", then displayed a revolver and demanded money. In 1987, Shakur confirmed to a journalist that there was a drug connection in this incident but refused to elaborate.

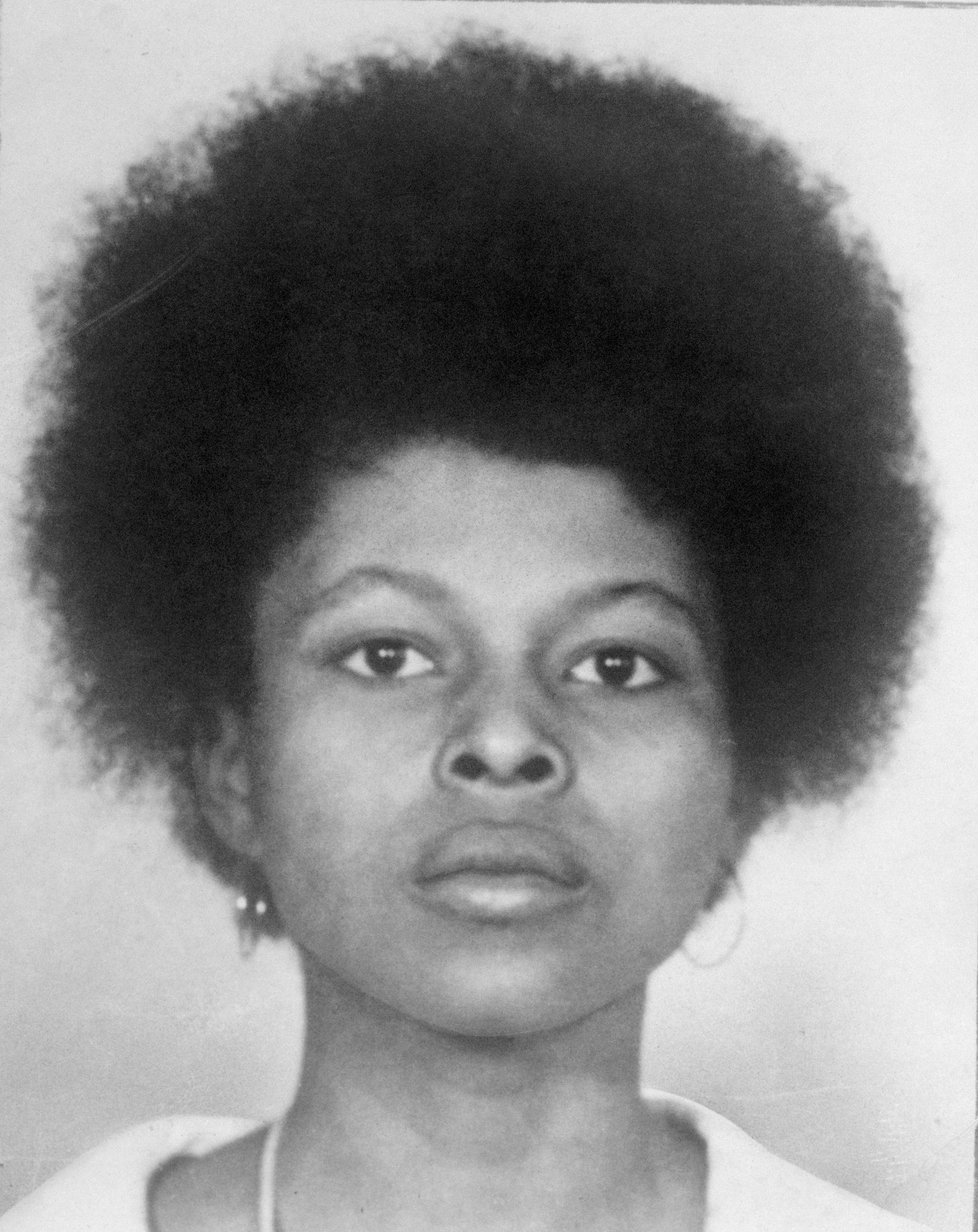
New York City Police Department mugshot of Shakur, April 1971

She was booked on charges of attempted robbery, assault, reckless endangerment, and possession of a deadly weapon, then released on bail. Shakur is alleged to have said that she was glad that she had been shot; afterward, she was no longer afraid to be shot again.

Following an August 23, 1971, bank robbery in Queens, Shakur was sought for questioning. A photograph of a woman (who was later alleged to be Shakur) wearing thick-rimmed black glasses, with a high hairdo pulled tightly over her head, and pointing a gun, was widely displayed in banks. The New York Clearing House Association paid for full-page ads displaying material about Shakur. In 1987, when asked in Cuba about police allegations that the BLA gained funds by conducting bank robberies and theft, Shakur responded, "There were expropriations, there were bank robberies."

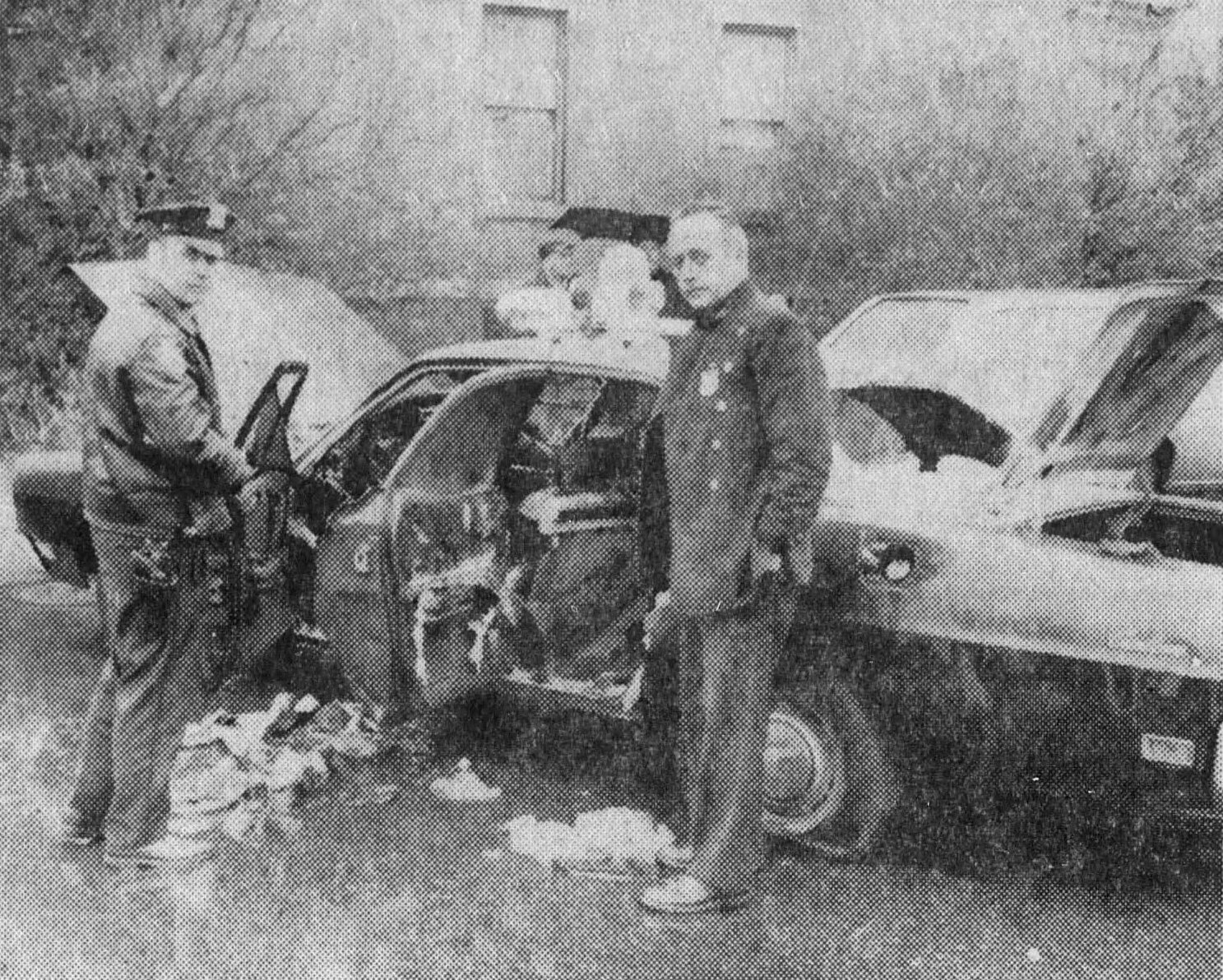
Police stand next to the patrol car that was destroyed by a hand grenade attack on December 20, 1971.

On December 21, 1971, Shakur was named by the New York City Police Department as one of four suspects in a hand grenade attack that destroyed a police car and injured two officers in Maspeth, Queens. When a witness identified Shakur and Andrew Jackson from FBI photographs, a 13-state alarm was issued three days after the attack. Law enforcement officials in Atlanta, Georgia, said that Shakur and Jackson had lived together in Atlanta for several months in the summer of 1971.

Shakur was wanted for questioning for wounding a police officer on January 26, 1972, who was attempting to serve a traffic summons in Brooklyn. After an $89,000 Brooklyn bank robbery on March 1, 1972, a Daily News headline asked: "Was that JoAnne?" Shakur was identified as wanted for questioning after a September 1, 1972, bank robbery in the Bronx.

On September 14, 1972, Monsignor John Powis alleged that Shakur was involved in an armed robbery at Our Lady of the Presentation Church in Brownsville, Brooklyn. Shakur and two men entered the church under the guise of asking for a letter of recommendation for a job. Powis was ordered to open the church's safe. When Powis struggled to open the safe, one of the robbers reportedly said "We usually just blow the heads off White men". After the safe was opened, Powis was tied up, gagged, had a hood put over his head, and then was locked in the bathroom. Powis identified Shakur in photographs shown to him by the police and stated that he didn't know her, but had heard of her because she was reportedly involved in the murder of a White real estate agent on Howard Avenue in Brooklyn a few weeks prior.

In 1972, Shakur became the subject of a nationwide manhunt after the FBI alleged that she led a Black Liberation Army cell that had conducted a "series of cold-blooded murders of New York City police officers". The FBI said these included the "execution style murders" of New York City Police Officers Joseph Piagentini and Waverly Jones on May 21, 1971, and NYPD officers Gregory Foster and Rocco Laurie on January 28, 1972. Shakur was alleged to have been directly involved with the Foster and Laurie murders, and involved tangentially with the Piagentini and Jones murders.

Some sources identify Shakur as the de facto head of the BLA after the arrest of co-founder Dhoruba Moore. Robert Daley, Deputy Commissioner of the New York City Police, for example, described Shakur as "the final wanted fugitive, the soul of the gang, the mother hen who kept them together, kept them moving, kept them shooting". Years later, some police officers argued that her importance in the BLA had been exaggerated by the police. One officer said that they had created a "myth" to "demonize" Shakur because she was "educated", "young and pretty".

As of February 17, 1972, when Shakur was identified as one of four BLA members on a short trip to Chattanooga, Tennessee, she was wanted for questioning (along with Robert Vickers, Twyman Meyers, Samuel Cooper, and Paul Stewart) in relation to police killings, a Queens bank robbery, and the grenade attack on police. Shakur was reported as one of six suspects in the ambushing of four policemen—two in Jamaica, Queens, and two in Brooklyn—on January 28, 1973.

By June 1973, an apparatus that would become the FBI's Joint Terrorism Task Force (JTTF) was issuing nearly daily briefings on Shakur's status and the allegations against her.

According to Kathleen Cleaver and George Katsiaficas, the FBI and local police "initiated a national search-and-destroy mission for suspected BLA members, collaborating in stakeouts that were the products of intensive political repression and counterintelligence campaigns like NEWKILL". They "attempted to tie Assata to every suspected action of the BLA involving a woman". The JTTF would later serve as the "coordinating body in the search for Assata and the renewed campaign to smash the BLA", after her escape from prison. After her capture, however, Shakur was not charged with any of the crimes for which she was purportedly the subject of the manhunt.

Shakur and others claim that she was targeted by the FBI's COINTELPRO as a result of her involvement with the black liberation organizations. Specifically, documentary evidence suggests that Shakur was targeted by an investigation named CHESROB, which "attempted to hook former New York Panther Joanne Chesimard (Assata Shakur) to virtually every bank robbery or violent crime involving a black woman on the East Coast". Although named after Shakur, CHESROB (like its predecessor, NEWKILL) was not limited to Shakur.

Years later when she was living in Cuba, Shakur was asked about the BLA's alleged involvement in the killings of police officers. She said, "In reality, armed struggle historically has been used by people to liberate themselves... But the question lies in when do people use armed struggle... There were people [in the BLA] who absolutely took the position that it was just time to resist, and if black people didn't start to fight back against police brutality and didn't start to wage armed resistance, we would be annihilated."

== New Jersey Turnpike shootout ==
On May 2, 1973, at about 12:45 a.m., Assata Shakur, along with Zayd Malik Shakur and Sundiata Acoli, were stopped on the New Jersey Turnpike in East Brunswick by State Trooper James Harper—backed up by Trooper Werner Foerster in a second patrol vehicle—for driving with a broken tail light. Also, the vehicle was "slightly" exceeding the speed limit. Recordings of Trooper Harper calling the dispatcher were played at the trials of both Acoli and Assata.

The stop occurred 200 yards (183 m) south of what was then the Turnpike Authority administration building. Acoli was driving the two-door vehicle, Assata was seated in the right front seat, and Zayd was in the right rear seat. (Note: Note that the New York Times source given here reverses the roles of Zayd Shakur and Acoli.) Trooper Harper asked the driver for identification, noticed a discrepancy, asked him to get out of the car, and questioned him at the rear of the vehicle.

With the questioning of Acoli, accounts by participants of the confrontation begin to differ. According to initial police statements, at this point one or more of the suspects had begun firing with semiautomatic handguns, and Trooper Foerster fired four times before falling mortally wounded. At Acoli's trial, Harper testified that the gunfight started "seconds" after Foerster arrived at the scene. Harper further testified that Foerster reached into the vehicle, pulled out and held up a semi-automatic pistol and ammunition magazine, and said, "Jim, look what I found," while facing Harper at the rear of the vehicle.

The police ordered Assata and Zayd to put their hands on their laps and not to move. Harper said that Assata reached down to the right of her right leg, pulled out a pistol, and shot him in the shoulder, after which he retreated behind his vehicle. Questioned by prosecutor C. Judson Hamlin, Harper said he saw Foerster shot just as Assata was hit by bullets from Harper's gun. In his opening statement to a jury, Hamlin said that Acoli shot Foerster with a .38 caliber semiautomatic pistol and used Foerster's own gun to "execute him". According to the testimony of State Police investigators, two jammed semi-automatic pistols were discovered near Foerster's body.

Acoli drove the car, a white Pontiac LeMans with Vermont license plates—which contained Assata, who was wounded, and Zayd, who was dead or dying—5 miles (8 km) down the road. The vehicle was chased by three patrol cars, and the booths down the turnpike were alerted. Acoli stopped and exited the car and, after being ordered to halt by a trooper, fled into the woods as the trooper emptied his gun. Assata walked toward the trooper with her bloodied arms raised in surrender. Acoli was captured after a 36-hour manhunt—involving 400 people, state police helicopters, and bloodhounds. Zayd's body was found in a nearby gully along the road.

According to a New Jersey Police spokesperson, Assata was on her way to a "new hideout in Philadelphia" and "heading ultimately for Washington". A book found in the vehicle was said to contain a list of potential BLA targets. Assata testified that she was on her way to Baltimore for a job as a bar waitress.

With gunshot wounds in both arms and a shoulder, Assata was moved to Middlesex General Hospital under "heavy guard" and was reported to be in "serious condition". Trooper Harper was wounded in the left shoulder, reported in "good" condition, and given a protective guard at the hospital. Assata was interrogated and arraigned from her hospital bed. Her defense team alleged that her medical care during this period was "substandard".

She was transferred from Middlesex General Hospital in New Brunswick to Roosevelt Hospital in Edison after her lawyers obtained a court order from Judge John Bachman. She was transferred a few weeks later to Middlesex County Workhouse.

During an interview, Assata discussed her treatment by the police and medical staff at Middlesex General Hospital. She said the police beat and choked her and were "doing everything that they could possibly do as soon as the doctors or nurses would go outside".

== Criminal charges and dispositions ==
Between 1973 and 1977, in New York and New Jersey, Assata Shakur was indicted ten times, resulting in seven different criminal trials. She was charged with two bank robberies, the kidnapping of a Brooklyn heroin dealer, the attempted murder of two Queens police officers stemming from a January 23, 1973, failed ambush, and eight other felonies related to the Turnpike shootout. Of these trials, three resulted in acquittals, one in a hung jury, one in a change of venue, one in a mistrial due to pregnancy, and one in a conviction. Three indictments were dismissed without trial.

Criminal charge	Court	Arraignment	Proceedings	Disposition
Attempted armed robbery at Statler Hilton Hotel; April 5, 1971	New York Supreme Court, New York County	November 22, 1977	None	Dismissed
Bank robbery in Queens; August 23, 1971	United States District Court for the Eastern District of New York	July 20, 1973	January 5–16, 1976	Acquitted
Bank robbery in Bronx: Conspiracy, robbery, and assault with a deadly weapon September 1, 1972	United States District Court for the Southern District of New York	August 1, 1973	December 3–14, 1973	Hung jury
Bank robbery in Bronx: Conspiracy, robbery, and assault with a deadly weapon September 1, 1972	United States District Court for the Southern District of New York	August 1, 1973	December 19–28, 1973	Acquitted
Kidnapping of James E. Freeman; December 28, 1972	N.Y. Supreme Court, Kings County	May 30, 1974	September 6 – December 19, 1975	Acquitted
Murder of Richard Nelson; January 2, 1973	N.Y. Supreme Court, New York County	May 29, 1974	None	Dismissed
Attempted murder of policemen Michael O'Reilly and Roy Polliana; January 23, 1973	N.Y. Supreme Court, Queens County	May 11, 1974	None	Dismissed
Turnpike shootout: First-degree murder, second-degree murder, atrocious assault and battery, assault and battery against a police officer, assault with a dangerous weapon, assault with intent to kill, illegal possession of a weapon, and armed robbery May 2, 1973	N.J. Superior Court, Middlesex County	May 3, 1973	October 9–23, 1973	Change of venue
Turnpike shootout: First-degree murder, second-degree murder, atrocious assault and battery, assault and battery against a police officer, assault with a dangerous weapon, assault with intent to kill, illegal possession of a weapon, and armed robbery May 2, 1973	N.J. Superior Court, Middlesex County	May 3, 1973	January 1 – February 1, 1974	Mistrial due to pregnancy
Turnpike shootout: First-degree murder, second-degree murder, atrocious assault and battery, assault and battery against a police officer, assault with a dangerous weapon, assault with intent to kill, illegal possession of a weapon, and armed robbery May 2, 1973	N.J. Superior Court, Middlesex County	May 3, 1973	February 15 – March 25, 1977	Convicted
Source: Shakur, 1987, p. xiv.

=== Bronx bank robbery mistrial ===
In December 1973, Shakur was tried for a September 29, 1972, $3,700 robbery of the Manufacturer's Hanover Trust Company in the Bronx, along with co-defendant Kamau Sadiki (born Fred Hilton). In light of the pending murder prosecution against Shakur in New Jersey state court, her lawyers requested that the trial be postponed for six months to permit further preparation. Judge Lee P. Gagliardi denied a postponement, and the Second Circuit denied Shakur's petition for mandamus. In protest, the lawyers stayed mute, and Shakur and Sadiki conducted their own defense. Seven other BLA members were indicted by District Attorney Eugene Gold in connection with the series of holdups and shootings on the same day, who—according to Gold—represented the "top echelon" of the BLA as determined by a year-long investigation.

The prosecution's case rested largely on the testimony of two men who had pleaded guilty to participating in the holdup. The prosecution called four witnesses: Avon White and John Rivers, both of whom had already pled guilty to the robbery, and the manager and teller of the bank. White and Rivers, although having pled guilty, had not yet been sentenced for the robbery and were promised that the charges would be dropped in exchange for their testimony.

White and Rivers testified that Shakur had guarded one of the doors with a .357 magnum pistol and that Sadiki had served as a lookout and drove the getaway truck during the robbery. Neither White nor Rivers was cross-examined due to the defense attorney's refusal to participate in the trial. Shakur's aunt and lawyer, Evelyn Williams, was cited for contempt of court after walking out of the courtroom after many of her attempted motions were denied. The trial was delayed for a few days after Shakur was diagnosed with pleurisy.

During the trial, the defendants were escorted to a "holding pen" outside the courtroom several times after shouting complaints and epithets at Judge Gagliardi. While in the holding pen, they listened to the proceedings over loudspeakers. Both defendants were repeatedly cited for contempt of court and eventually barred from the courtroom, where the trial continued in their absence. A contemporary New York Times editorial criticized Williams for failing to maintain courtroom "decorum," comparing her actions to William Kunstler's recent contempt conviction for his actions during the "Chicago Seven" trial.

Sadiki's lawyer, Robert Bloom, attempted to have the trial dismissed and then postponed due to new "revelations" regarding the credibility of White, a former co-defendant, by then working for the prosecution. Bloom had been assigned to defend Sadiki/Hilton over the summer, but White was not disclosed as a government witness until right before the trial. Judge Gagliardi instructed both the prosecution and the defense not to bring up Shakur or Sadiki's connections to the BLA, saying they were "not relevant". Gagliardi denied requests by the jurors to pose questions to the witnesses—either directly or through him—and declined to provide the jury with information they requested about how long the defense had been given to prepare, saying it was "none of their concern". This trial resulted in a hung jury and then a mistrial, when the jury reported to Gagliardi that they were hopelessly deadlocked for the fourth time.

=== Bronx bank robbery retrial ===
The retrial was delayed for one day to give the defendants more time to prepare. The new jury selection was marked by attempts by Williams to be relieved of her duties, owing to disagreements with Shakur as well as with Hilton's attorney. Judge Arnold Bauman denied the application, but directed another lawyer, Howard Jacobs, to defend Shakur while Williams remained the attorney of record. Shakur was ejected following an argument with Williams, and Hilton left with her as jury selection continued.

After the selection of twelve jurors (60 were excused), Williams was allowed to retire from the case, with Shakur officially representing herself, assisted by lawyer Florynce Kennedy. In the retrial, White testified that the six alleged robbers had saved their hair clippings to create disguises, and identified a partially obscured head and shoulder in a photo taken from a surveillance camera as Shakur's. Kennedy objected to this identification on the grounds that the prosecutor, assistant United States attorney Peter Truebner, had offered to stipulate that Shakur was not depicted in any of the photographs.

Although both White and Rivers testified that Shakur was wearing overalls during the robbery, the person identified as Shakur in the photograph was wearing a jacket. The defense attempted to discredit White on the grounds that he had spent eight months in Matteawan Hospital for the Criminally Insane in 1968, and White countered that he had faked insanity (by claiming to be Allah in front of three psychiatrists) to get transferred out of prison.

Shakur personally cross-examined the witnesses, getting White to admit that he had once been in love with her; the same day, one juror (who had been frequently napping during the trial) was replaced with an alternate. During the retrial, the defendants repeatedly left or were thrown out of the courtroom. Both defendants were acquitted in the retrial; six jurors interviewed after the trial stated that they did not believe the two key prosecution witnesses. Shakur was immediately returned to Morristown, New Jersey, under a heavy guard following the trial. Louis Chesimard (Shakur's ex-husband) and Paul Stewart, the other two alleged robbers, had been acquitted in June.

=== Turnpike shootout mistrial ===
The Turnpike shootout proceedings continued with Judge John E. Bachman in Middlesex County. New Jersey Superior Court Judge Leon Gerofsky ordered a change of venue in 1973 from Middlesex to Morris County, New Jersey, saying "it was almost impossible to obtain a jury here comprising people willing to accept the responsibility of impartiality so that defendants will be protected from transitory passion and prejudice." Morris County had a far smaller black population than Middlesex County. On this basis, Shakur unsuccessfully attempted to move the trial to federal court.

Before jury selection was complete, it was discovered that Shakur was pregnant. Due to the possibility of miscarriage, the prosecution successfully requested a mistrial for Shakur; Acoli's trial continued.

=== Attempted murder dismissal ===
Shakur and four others (including Fred Hilton, Avon White, and Andrew Jackson) were indicted in the State Supreme Court in the Bronx on December 31, 1973, on charges of attempting to shoot and kill two policemen—Michael O'Reilly and Roy Polliana, who were wounded but had since returned to duty—in an ambush in St. Albans, Queens, on January 28, 1973. On March 5, 1974, two new defendants (Jeannette Jefferson and Robert Hayes) were named in an indictment involving the same charges. On April 26, while Shakur was pregnant, New Jersey Governor Brendan Byrne signed an extradition order to move Shakur to New Jersey to face two counts of attempted murder, attempted assault, and possession of dangerous weapons related to the alleged ambush; however, Shakur declined to waive her right to an extradition hearing, and asked for a full hearing before Middlesex County Court Judge John E. Bachman.

Shakur was extradited to New York City on May 6, arraigned on May 11 (pleading not guilty), and remanded to jail by Justice Albert S. McGrover of the State Supreme Court, pending a pretrial hearing on July 2. In November 1974, New York State Supreme Court Justice Peter Farrell dismissed the attempted murder indictment because of insufficient evidence, declaring "The court can only note with disapproval that virtually a year has passed before counsel made an application for the most basic relief permitted by law, namely an attack on the sufficiency of the evidence submitted by the grand jury."

=== Kidnapping trial ===
Shakur was indicted on May 30, 1974, on the charge of having robbed a Brooklyn bar and kidnapping bartender James E. Freeman for ransom. Shakur and co-defendant Ronald Myers were accused of entering the bar with pistols and shotguns, taking $50 from the register, kidnapping the bartender, leaving a note demanding a $20,000 ransom from the bar owner, and fleeing in a rented truck. Freeman was said to have later escaped unhurt. The text of Shakur's opening statement in the trial is reproduced in her autobiography. Shakur and co-defendant Ronald Myers were acquitted on December 19, 1975, after seven hours of jury deliberation, ending a three-month trial in front of Judge William Thompson.

=== Queens bank robbery trial ===
In July 1973, after being indicted by a grand jury, Shakur pleaded not guilty in Federal Court in Brooklyn to an indictment related to a $7,700 robbery of the Bankers Trust Company bank in Queens on August 31, 1971. Judge Jacob Mishlerset set a tentative trial date of November 5 that year. The trial was delayed until 1976, when Shakur was represented by Stanley Cohen and Evelyn Williams. In this trial, Shakur acted as her own co-counsel and told the jury in her opening testimony:

I have decided to act as co-counsel, and to make this opening statement, not because I have any illusions about my legal abilities, but, rather, because there are things that I must say to you. I have spent many days and nights behind bars thinking about this trial, this outrage. And in my own mind, only someone who has been so intimately a victim of this madness as I have can do justice to what I have to say.

One bank employee testified that Shakur was one of the bank robbers. Three other bank employees, including two tellers, testified that they were uncertain. The prosecution showed surveillance photos of four of the six alleged robbers, contending that one of them was Shakur wearing a wig. Shakur was forcibly subdued and photographed by the FBI on the judge's order, after having refused to cooperate, believing that the FBI would use photo manipulation. A subsequent judge determined that the manners in which the photos were obtained violated Shakur's rights and ruled the new photos inadmissible.

In her autobiography, Shakur recounts being beaten, choked, and kicked on the courtroom floor by five marshals, as Williams narrated the events to ensure they would appear on the court record. Shortly after deliberation began, the jury asked to see all the photographic exhibits taken from the surveillance footage. The jury determined that a widely circulated FBI photo allegedly showing Shakur participating in the robbery was not her.

Shakur was acquitted after seven hours of jury deliberation on January 16, 1976, and was immediately remanded back to New Jersey for the Turnpike trial. The actual transfer took place on January 29. She was the only one of the six suspects in the robbery to be brought to trial. Andrew Jackson and two others indicted for the same robbery pleaded guilty. Jackson was sentenced to five years in prison and five years' probation. Another was shot and killed in a gunfight in Florida on December 31, 1971, and the last remained at large at the time of Shakur's acquittal.

=== Turnpike shootout retrial ===
Shakur's murder trial for the Turnpike shootout took place in New Brunswick, Middlesex County, New Jersey, not far from the East Brunswick site of the gunfight.

By the time she was retried in 1977, Acoli had already been convicted of shooting and murdering Foerster. The prosecution argued that Assata had fired the bullets that had wounded Harper, while the defense argued that the now deceased Zayd had fired them. Based on New Jersey law, if Shakur's presence at the scene could be considered as "aiding and abetting" the murder of Foerster, she could be convicted even if she had not fired the bullets which had killed him.

A total of 289 articles had been published in the local press relating to the various crimes with which Shakur had been accused. Shakur again attempted to move the trial to federal court. The United States District Court for the District of New Jersey denied the petition and also denied Shakur an injunction against the holding of trial proceedings on Fridays. An en banc panel of the United States Court of Appeals for the Third Circuit affirmed.

The nine-week trial was widely publicized and was even reported on by the Telegraph Agency of the Soviet Union (TASS). During the trial, hundreds of civil rights campaigners demonstrated outside of the Middlesex County courthouse each day.

Following the 13-minute opening statement by Edward J. Barone, the first assistant Middlesex County prosecutor (directing the case for the state), William Kunstler (the chief of Shakur's defense staff) moved immediately for a mistrial, calling the eight-count grand jury indictment "adversary proceeding solely and exclusively under the control of the prosecutor", whom Kunstler accused of "improper prejudicial remarks"; Judge Theodore Appleby, noting the frequent defense interruptions that had characterized the previous days' jury selection, denied the motion.

On February 23, Shakur's attorneys filed papers asking Judge Appleby to subpoena FBI Director Clarence Kelley, Senator Frank Church and other federal and New York City law enforcement officials to testify about the FBI Counter Intelligence Program, which they alleged was designed to harass and disrupt black activist organizations. Kunstler had previously been successful in subpoenaing Kelley and Church for the trials of American Indian Movement (AIM) members charged with murdering FBI agents. The motion (argued March 2)—which also asked the court to require the production of memos, tapes, documents, and photographs of alleged COINTELPRO involvement from 1970 to 1973—was denied.

Shakur herself was called as a witness on March 15, the first witness called by the defense; she denied shooting either Harper or Foerster, and also denied handling a weapon during the incident. She was questioned by her own attorney, Stuart Ball, for under 40 minutes, and then cross-examined by Barone for less than two hours (see the Witnesses section below). Ball's questioning ended with the following exchange:

On that night of May 2[n]d, did you shoot, kill, execute or have anything to do with the death of Trooper Werner Foerster?

No.

Did you shoot or assault Trooper James Harper?

No.

Under cross-examination, Shakur was unable to explain how three magazines of ammunition and 16 live shells had gotten into her shoulder bag; she also admitted to knowing that Zayd Shakur carried a gun at times, and specifically to seeing a gun sticking out of Acoli's pocket while stopping for supper at a Howard Johnson's restaurant shortly before the shooting. Shakur admitted to carrying an identification card with the name "Justine Henderson" in her billfold the night of the shootout, but denied using any of the aliases on the long list that Barone proceeded to read.

==== Defense attorneys ====
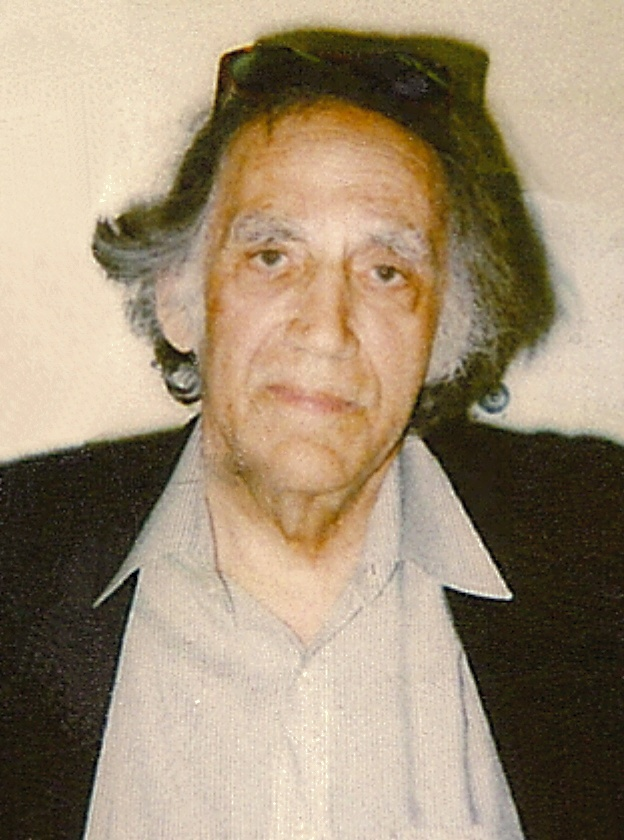
William Kunstler, the chief of Shakur's defense staff.

Shakur's defense attorneys were William Kunstler (the chief of Shakur's defense staff), Stuart Ball, Robert Bloom, Raymond A. Brown, Stanley Cohen (who died of unknown causes early on in the Turnpike trial), Lennox Hinds, Florynce Kennedy, Louis Myers, Laurence Stern, and Evelyn Williams, Shakur's aunt. Of these attorneys, Kunstler, Ball, Cohen, Myers, Stern and Williams appeared in court for the turnpike trial. Kunstler became involved in Shakur's trials in 1975, when contacted by Williams, and commuted from New York City to New Brunswick every day with Stern.

Her attorneys, in particular Lennox Hinds, were often held in contempt of court, which the National Conference of Black Lawyers cited as an example of systemic bias in the judicial system. The New Jersey Legal Ethics Committee also investigated complaints against Hinds for comparing Shakur's murder trial to "legalized lynching" undertaken by a "kangaroo court". Hinds' disciplinary proceeding reached the U.S. Supreme Court in Middlesex County Ethics Committee v. Garden State Bar Ass'n (1982). According to Kunstler's autobiography, the sizable contingent of New Jersey State Troopers guarding the courthouse were under strict orders from their commander, Col. Clinton Pagano, to completely shun Shakur's defense attorneys.

Judge Appleby also threatened Kunstler with dismissal and contempt of court after he delivered an October 21, 1976, speech at nearby Rutgers University that in part discussed the upcoming trial, but later ruled that Kunstler could represent Shakur. Until obtaining a court order, Kunstler was forced to strip naked and undergo a body search before each visit with Shakur—during which Shakur was shackled to a bed by both ankles. Judge Appleby also refused to investigate a burglary of her defense counsel's office that resulted in the disappearance of trial documents, amounting to half of the legal papers related to her case. Her lawyers also claimed that their offices were secretly recorded.

==== Witnesses ====
Sundiata Acoli, Assata Shakur, Trooper Harper, and a New Jersey Turnpike driver who saw part of the incident were the only surviving witnesses. Acoli did not testify or make any pre-trial statements, nor did he testify in his own trial or give a statement to the police. The driver traveling north on the turnpike testified that he had seen a State Trooper struggling with a Black man between a white vehicle and a State Trooper car, whose revolving lights illuminated the area.

Shakur testified that Trooper Harper shot her after she raised her arms to comply with his demand. She said that the second shot hit her in the back as she turned to avoid it, and that she fell onto the road for the duration of the gunfight before crawling back into the backseat of the Pontiac—which Acoli drove 5 miles (8 km) down the road and parked. She testified that she remained there until State Troopers dragged her onto the road.

Trooper Harper's official reports state that after he stopped the Pontiac, he ordered Acoli to the back of the vehicle for Trooper Foerster—who had arrived on the scene—to examine his driver's license. The reports then state that after Acoli complied, and as Harper was looking inside the vehicle to examine the registration, Trooper Foerster yelled and held up an ammunition magazine as Shakur simultaneously reached into her red pocketbook, pulled out a 9mm handgun and fired at him. Trooper Harper's reports then state that he ran to the rear of his car and shot at Shakur who had exited the vehicle and was firing from a crouched position next to the vehicle.

==== Jury ====
A total of 408 potential jurors were questioned during the voir dire, which concluded on February 14. All of the 15 jurors—ten women and five men—were white, and most were under thirty years old. Five jurors had personal ties to State Troopers (one girlfriend, two nephews, and two friends). A sixteenth female juror was removed before the trial formally opened, when it was determined that Sheriff Joseph DeMarino of Middlesex County, while a private detective several years earlier, had worked for a lawyer who represented the juror's husband. Judge Appleby repeatedly denied Kunstler's requests for DeMarino to be removed from his responsibilities for the duration of the trial "because he did not divulge his association with the juror".

One prospective juror was dismissed for reading Target Blue, a book by Robert Daley, a former New York City Deputy Police Commander, which dealt in part with Shakur and had been left in the jury assembly room. Before the jury entered the courtroom, Judge Appleby ordered Shakur's lawyers to remove a copy of Roots: The Saga of an American Family by Alex Haley from a position on the defense counsel table easily visible to jurors. The Roots TV miniseries adapted from the book and shown shortly before the trial was believed to have evoked feelings of "guilt and sympathy" with many white viewers.

Shakur's attorneys sought a new trial on the grounds that one jury member, John McGovern, had violated the jury's sequestration order. Judge Appleby rejected Kunstler's claim that the juror had violated the order. McGovern later sued Kunstler for defamation; Kunstler eventually publicly apologized to McGovern and paid him a small settlement. Additionally, in his autobiography, Kunstler alleged that he later learned from a law enforcement agent that a New Jersey State Assembly member had addressed the jury at the hotel where they were sequestered, urging them to convict Shakur.

==== Medical evidence ====
A key element of Shakur's defense was medical testimony meant to demonstrate that she was shot with her hands up and that she would have been subsequently unable to fire a weapon. A neurologist testified that the median nerve in Shakur's right arm was severed by the second bullet, making her unable to pull a trigger. Neurosurgeon Dr. Arthur Turner Davidson, Associate Professor of Surgery at Albert Einstein College of Medicine, testified that the wounds in her upper arms, armpit and chest, and severed median nerve that instantly paralyzed her right arm, would only have been caused if both arms were raised, and that to sustain such injuries while crouching and firing a weapon (as described in Trooper Harper's testimony) "would be anatomically impossible".

Davidson based his testimony on an August 4, 1976, examination of Shakur and on X-rays taken immediately after the shootout at Middlesex General Hospital. Prosecutor Barone questioned whether Davidson was qualified to make such a judgment 39 months after the injury; Barone proceeded to suggest (while a female Sheriff's attendant acted out his suggestion) that Shakur was struck in the right arm and collar bone and "then spun around by the impact of the bullet so an immediate second shot entered the fleshy part of her upper left arm" to which Davidson replied, "Impossible."

Dr. David Spain, a pathologist from Brookdale Community College, testified that her bullet scars as well as X-rays supported her claim that her arms were raised, and that there was "no conceivable way" the first bullet could have hit Shakur's clavicle if her arm was down.

Judge Appleby eventually cut off funds for any further expert defense testimony. Shakur, in her autobiography, and Williams, in Inadmissible Evidence, both claim that it was difficult to find expert witnesses for the trial, because of the expense and because most forensic and ballistic specialists declined on the grounds of a conflict of interest when approached because they routinely performed such work for law enforcement officials.

==== Other evidence ====
According to Angela Davis, neutron activation analysis that was administered after the shootout showed no gunpowder residue on Shakur's fingers and forensic analysis performed at the Trenton, New Jersey, crime lab and the FBI crime labs in Washington, D.C., did not find her fingerprints on any weapon at the scene. According to tape recordings and police reports made several hours after the shoot-out, when Harper returned on foot to the administration building 200 yards (183 m) away, he did not report Foerster's presence at the scene; no one at headquarters knew of Foerster's involvement in the shoot-out until his body was discovered beside his patrol car, more than an hour later.

==== Conviction and sentencing ====
On March 24, the jurors listened for 45 minutes to a rereading of testimony of the State Police chemist regarding the blood found at the scene, on the LeMans, and Shakur's clothing. That night, the second night of jury deliberation, the jury asked Judge Appleby to repeat his instructions regarding the four assault charges 30 minutes before retiring for the night, which led to speculation that the jury had decided in Shakur's favor on the remaining charges, especially the two counts of murder.

Appleby reiterated that the jury must consider separately the four assault charges (atrocious assault and battery, assault on a police officer acting in the line of duty, assault with a deadly weapon, and assault with intent to kill), each of which carried a total maximum penalty of 33 years in prison. The other charges were: first-degree murder (of Foerster), second-degree murder (of Zayd Shakur), illegal possession of a weapon, and armed robbery (related to Foerster's service revolver). The jury also asked Appleby to repeat the definitions of "intent" and "reasonable doubt".

Shakur was convicted on all eight counts: two murder charges and six assault charges. Upon hearing the verdict, Shakur said—in a barely audible voice—"I am ashamed that I have even taken part in this trial", and that the jury was racist and had "convicted a woman with her hands up." When Judge Appleby told the court attendants to "remove the prisoner," Shakur herself replied: "The prisoner will walk away on her own feet." After Joseph W. Lewis, the jury foreman, read the verdict, Kunstler asked that the jury be removed before alleging that one juror had violated the sequestration order (as detailed above).

At the post-trial press conference, Kunstler blamed the verdict on racism, stating that "the white element was there to destroy her". When asked by a reporter why, if that were the case, it took the jury 24 hours to reach a verdict, Kunstler replied, "That was just a pretense." A few minutes later the prosecutor Barone disagreed with Kunstler's assessment saying the trial's outcome was decided "completely on the facts".

At Shakur's sentencing hearing on April 25, Appleby sentenced her to 26 to 33 years in state prison (10 to 12 for the four counts of assault, 12 to 15 for robbery, 2 to 3 for armed robbery, plus 2 to 3 for aiding and abetting the murder of Foerster), to be served consecutively with her mandatory life sentence. However, Appleby dismissed the second-degree murder of Zayd Shakur, as the New Jersey Supreme Court had recently narrowed the application of the law. Appleby finally sentenced Shakur to 30 days in the Middlesex County Workhouse for contempt of court, concurrent with the other sentences, for refusing to rise when he entered the courtroom. To become eligible for parole, Shakur would have had to serve a minimum of 25 years, which would have included her four years in custody during the trials.

=== Nelson murder dismissal ===
In October 1977, New York State Superior Court Justice John Starkey dismissed murder and robbery charges against Shakur related to the death of Richard Nelson during a hold-up of a Brooklyn social club on December 28, 1972, ruling that the state had delayed too long in bringing her to trial. Judge Starkey said, "People have constitutional rights, and you can't shuffle them around." The case was delayed in being brought to trial as a result of an agreement between the governors of New York and New Jersey as to the priority of the charges against Shakur.

Three other defendants were indicted in relation to the same holdup: Melvin Kearney died in 1976 from an eight-floor fall while trying to escape from the Brooklyn House of Detention. Twymon Myers was killed by police while a fugitive. Andrew Jackson had the charges against him dismissed after two prosecution witnesses could not identify him in a lineup.

=== Attempted robbery dismissal ===
On November 22, 1977, Shakur pleaded not guilty to an attempted armed robbery indictment stemming from the 1971 incident at the Statler Hilton Hotel. Shakur was accused of attempting to rob a Michigan man staying at the hotel of $250 of cash and personal property. The prosecutor was C. Richard Gibbons. The charges were dismissed without trial.

== Imprisonment ==
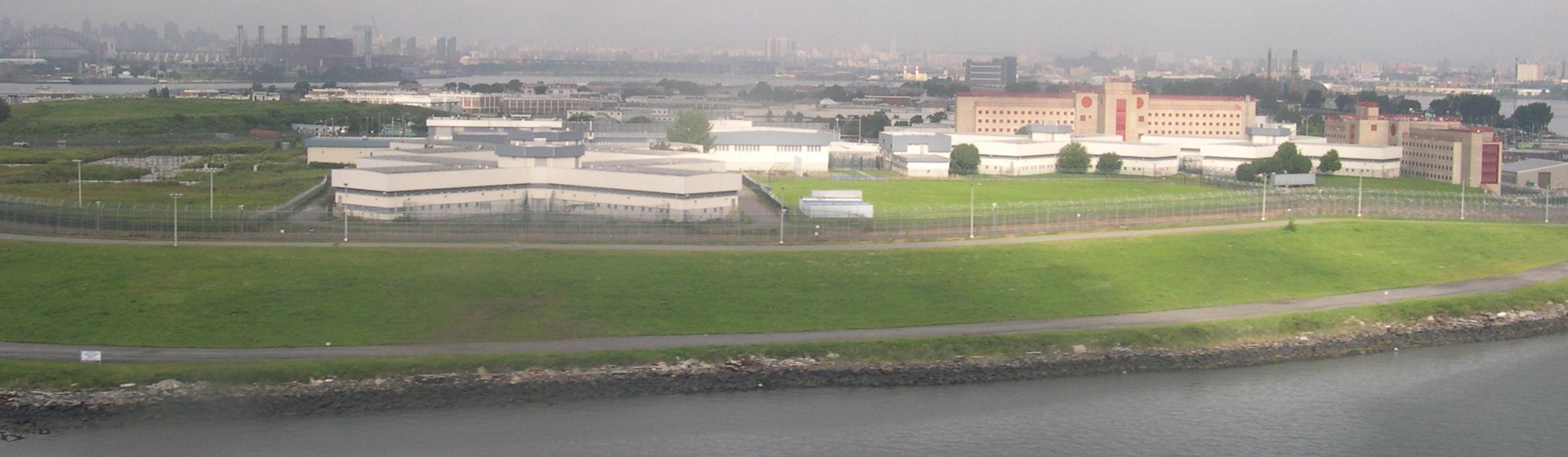
Shakur was kept in solitary confinement on Rikers Island for 21 months.

After the Turnpike shootings, Shakur was briefly held at the Garden State Youth Correctional Facility in Yardville, Burlington County, New Jersey, and later moved to Rikers Island Correctional Institution for Women in New York City where she was kept in solitary confinement for 21 months. Shakur's only daughter, Kakuya Shakur, was conceived with Kamau Sadiki during Shakur's trial. Kakuya was born on September 11, 1974, in the "fortified psychiatric ward" at Elmhurst General Hospital in Queens, where Shakur stayed for a few days before being returned to Rikers Island.

In her autobiography, Shakur claims that she was beaten and restrained by several large female officers after refusing a medical exam from a prison doctor shortly after giving birth. After a bomb threat was made against Judge Appleby, Sheriff Joseph DeMarino lied to the press about the exact date of her transfer to Clinton Correctional Facility for Women; he later claimed the threat to be the cause of his falsification. She was also transferred from the Clinton Correctional Facility for Women to a special area staffed by women guards at the Garden State Youth Correctional Facility, where she was the only female inmate, for "security reasons".

When Kunstler first took on Shakur's case (before meeting her), he described her basement cell as "adequate", which nearly resulted in his dismissal as her attorney. On May 6, 1977, Judge Clarkson Fisher, of the United States District Court for the District of New Jersey, denied Shakur's request for an injunction requiring her transfer from the all-male facility to Clinton Correctional Facility for Women; the Third Circuit affirmed.

On April 8, 1978, Shakur was transferred to Alderson Federal Prison Camp in Alderson, West Virginia, where she met Puerto Rican nationalist Lolita Lebrón and Mary Alice, a Catholic nun, who introduced Shakur to the concept of liberation theology. At Alderson, Shakur was housed in the Maximum Security Unit, which also contained several members of the Aryan Sisterhood as well as Sandra Good and Lynette Fromme, followers of Charles Manson.

On February 20, 1979, after the Maximum Security Unit at Alderson was closed, Shakur was transferred to the Clinton Correctional Facility for Women in New Jersey. According to her attorney Lennox Hinds, Shakur "understates the awfulness of the condition in which she was incarcerated", which included vaginal and anal searches. Hinds argues that "in the history of New Jersey, no woman pretrial detainee or prisoner has ever been treated as she was, continuously confined in a men's prison, under twenty-four-hour surveillance of her most intimate functions, without intellectual sustenance, adequate medical attention, and exercise, and without the company of other women for all the years she was in custody".

Shakur was identified as a political prisoner as early as October 8, 1973, by Angela Davis, and in an April 3, 1977, The New York Times advertisement purchased by the Easter Coalition for Human Rights. An international panel of seven jurists were invited by Hinds to tour a number of U.S. prisons, and concluded in a report filed with the United Nations Commission on Human Rights that the conditions of her solitary confinement were "totally unbefitting any prisoner". Their investigation, which focused on alleged human rights abuses of political prisoners, cited Shakur as "one of the worst cases" of such abuses and including her in "a class of victims of FBI misconduct through the COINTELPRO strategy and other forms of illegal government conduct who as political activists have been selectively targeted for provocation, false arrests, entrapment, fabrication of evidence, and spurious criminal prosecutions". Amnesty International, however, did not regard Shakur as a former political prisoner.

== Escape ==
In early 1979, "the Family", a group of BLA members, began to plan Shakur's escape from prison. They financed this by stealing $105,000 from a Bamberger's store in Paramus, New Jersey. On November 2, 1979, Shakur escaped the Clinton Correctional Facility for Women in New Jersey when three members of the Black Liberation Army visiting her drew concealed .45-caliber pistols and a stick of dynamite, seized two correction officers as hostages, commandeered a van and (with the assistance of members of the May 19th Communist Organization) made their escape. No one was injured during the prison break, including the officers held as hostages who were left in a parking lot.

According to later court testimony, Shakur lived in Pittsburgh until August 1980, when she flew to the Bahamas. Mutulu Shakur, Silvia Baraldini, Sekou Odinga, and Marilyn Buck were charged with assisting in her escape; Ronald Boyd Hill was also held on charges related to the escape. In part for his role in the event, Mutulu was named on July 23, 1982, as the 380th addition to the FBI's Ten Most Wanted Fugitives list, where he remained for the next four years until his capture in 1986. State correction officials disclosed in November 1979 that they had not run identity checks on Shakur's visitors and that the three men and one woman who assisted in her escape had presented false identification to enter the prison's visitor room, before which they were not searched. Mutulu Shakur and Buck were convicted in 1988 of several robberies as well as the prison escape.

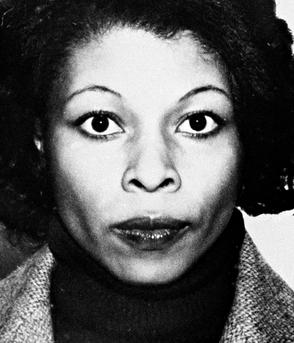
A photo of fugitive Assata Shakur from 1977, distributed by the FBI in 1982.

At the time of the escape, Kunstler had just started to prepare her appeal. After her escape, Shakur lived as a fugitive for several years. The FBI circulated wanted posters throughout the New York–New Jersey area; her supporters hung "Assata Shakur is Welcome Here" posters in response. In New York, three days after her escape, more than 5,000 demonstrators organized by the National Black Human Rights Coalition carried signs with the same slogan. At the rally, a statement from Shakur was circulated condemning U.S. prison conditions and calling for an independent "New Afrikan" state.

For years after Shakur's escape, the movements, activities and phone calls of her friends and relatives—including her daughter walking to school in upper Manhattan—were monitored by investigators in an attempt to ascertain her whereabouts. In July 1980, FBI director William H. Webster said that the search for Shakur had been frustrated by residents' refusal to cooperate, and a New York Times editorial opined that the department's commitment to "enforce the law with vigor—but also with sensitivity for civil rights and civil liberties" had been "clouded" by an "apparently crude sweep" through a Harlem building in search of Shakur.

In particular, one pre-dawn April 20, 1980, raid on 92 Morningside Avenue, during which FBI agents armed with shotguns and machine guns broke down doors and searched through the building for several hours while preventing residents from leaving, was seen by residents as having "racist overtones". In October 1980, New Jersey and New York City Police denied published reports that they had declined to raid a Bedford–Stuyvesant, Brooklyn building where Shakur was suspected to be hiding for fear of provoking a racial incident. Following her escape, Shakur was also charged with unlawful flight to avoid imprisonment.

== Political asylum in Cuba ==
In 1984, Shakur was in Cuba having traveled to the country from Mexico according to former FBI Assistant Director John Miller. That year she was granted political asylum there. The Cuban government paid approximately $13 a day toward her living expenses. In 1985, her daughter, Kakuya, who had been raised by Shakur's mother in New York, came to live with her. In 1987 her presence in Cuba became widely known when she agreed to be interviewed by Newsday.

In an open letter, Shakur said Cuba was "One of the Largest, Most Resistant and Most Courageous Palenques (Maroon Camps) that has ever existed on the Face of this Planet". She said Fidel Castro was a "hero of the oppressed" and referred to herself as a "20th century escaped slave". Shakur is also known to have worked as an English-language editor for Radio Havana Cuba.

=== Books ===
In 1987 she published Assata: An Autobiography, which was written in Cuba. Her autobiography has been cited in relation to critical legal studies and critical race theory. The book does not give a detailed account of her involvement in the BLA or the events on the New Jersey Turnpike, except to say that the jury "[c]onvicted a woman with her hands up!" It gives an account of her life beginning with her youth in the South and New York. Shakur challenges traditional styles of literary autobiography and offers a perspective on her life that is not easily accessible to the public.

The book was published by Lawrence Hill & Company in the United States and Canada but the copyright is held by Zed Books Ltd. of London due to "Son of Sam" laws, which restrict who can receive profits from a book. In the six months preceding the publications of the book, Evelyn Williams, Shakur's aunt and attorney, made several trips to Cuba and served as a go-between with Hill. Her autobiography was republished in Britain in 2014 and a dramatized version performed on BBC Radio 4 in July 2017.

In 1993 she published a second book, Still Black, Still Strong, with Dhoruba bin Wahad and Mumia Abu-Jamal.

In 2005 SUNY Press released The New Abolitionists: (Neo)Slave Narratives and Contemporary Prison Writings, edited and with an added introduction by Joy James, in which Shakur's "Women in Prison: How We Are" is featured.

=== Extradition attempts ===
In 1997 Carl Williams, the superintendent of the New Jersey State Police, wrote a letter to Pope John Paul II asking him to raise the issue of Shakur's extradition during his talks with President Fidel Castro. During the pope's visit to Cuba in 1998, Shakur agreed to an interview with NBC journalist Ralph Penza. Shakur later published an extensive criticism of the NBC segment, which inter-spliced footage of Trooper Foerster's grieving widow with an FBI photo connected to a bank robbery of which Shakur had been acquitted.

In March 1998, New Jersey Governor Christine Todd Whitman asked U.S. Attorney General Janet Reno to do whatever it would take to extradite Shakur from Cuba. Later in 1998, U.S. media widely reported claims that the United States State Department had offered to lift the Cuban embargo in exchange for the return of 90 U.S. fugitives, including Shakur.

In September 1998, the United States Congress passed a non-binding resolution, asking Cuba for the return of Shakur as well as 90 fugitives believed by Congress to be residing in Cuba; House Concurrent Resolution 254 passed 371–0 in the House and by unanimous consent in the Senate. The Resolution followed the lobbying efforts of Governor Whitman and New Jersey Representative Bob Franks. Before the passage of the Resolution, Franks stated: "This escaped murderer now lives a comfortable life in Cuba and has launched a public relations campaign in which she attempts to portray herself as an innocent victim rather than a cold-blooded murderer."

In September 1998, in an open letter to Castro, chair of the Congressional Black Caucus Representative Maxine Waters of California said that many members of the Caucus, including herself, were against Shakur's extradition and had mistakenly voted for the bill, which was placed on the accelerated suspension calendar, generally reserved for non-controversial legislation. In the letter, Waters explained her opposition, calling COINTELPRO "illegal, clandestine political persecution."

On May 2, 2005, the 32nd anniversary of the Turnpike shootings, the FBI classified her as a domestic terrorist, increasing the reward for assistance in her capture to $1 million, the largest reward placed on an individual in the history of New Jersey. New Jersey State Police superintendent Rick Fuentes said "she is now 120 pounds of money." The bounty announcement reportedly caused Shakur to "drop out of sight" after having previously lived relatively openly, including having her home telephone number listed in her local telephone directory. New York City Councilman Charles Barron, a former Black Panther, called for the bounty to be rescinded.

The New Jersey State Police and Federal Bureau of Investigation had an agent officially assigned to her case while she was an escapee. Calls for Shakur's extradition increased following Fidel Castro's 2006–2008 transfer of presidential duties. In a May 2005 television address, Castro had called Shakur a victim of racial persecution, saying "They wanted to portray her as a terrorist, something that was an injustice, a brutality, an infamous lie."

In 2013, the FBI announced it had added Shakur to its list of 'Most Wanted Terrorists', the first time that a woman was so designated. The reward for her capture and return was doubled to $2 million.

In June 2017, President Donald Trump gave a speech "cancelling" the Cuban thaw policies of his predecessor Barack Obama. A condition of making a new deal between the United States and Cuba is the release of political prisoners and the return of fugitives from justice. Trump specifically called for the return of "the cop-killer Joanne Chesimard".

== Personal life and death ==
In April 1967, she married Louis Chesimard, a fellow student-activist at CCNY, in a Catholic wedding ceremony. Their married life ended within a year; they divorced in December 1970 and Chesimard was granted an annulment. In her 320-page memoir, Shakur gave one paragraph to her marriage, saying that it ended over their differing views of gender roles.

Shakur's daughter, Kakuya Shakur, was born during her trial for murder. Kakuya's father is Kamau Sadiki, another codefendant in the case.

Shakur was widely described as rapper Tupac Shakur's godmother.

According to the Cuban Ministry of Foreign Affairs, Assata Shakur died in Havana on September 25, 2025, following health problems. She was 78.

== Cultural influence and legacy ==
The Guardian describes Shakur as "an icon of Black liberation", noting that "her life and memoir inspired racial justice movements for decades." Shakur's writings have influenced the 2020s Black Lives Matter movement. In their obituaries, The New York Times and Rolling Stone called Shakur a folk hero. BBC News described her as a hero to many US left wing activists. ABC News noted that she "continued to be a top priority for law enforcement officials in the United States over more than four decades". Shakur also served as a symbol for fraught Cuba–United States relations. Academic Joy James described Shakur as "extraordinary" for surviving in exile despite the U.S. bounty on her, and for being a leader not tied to a male counterpart, unlike other Black female revolutionaries of her era. Her reputation exceeded that of all other East Coast Panthers.

According to academic Dylan Rodriguez, to many "U.S. radicals and revolutionaries" Shakur represents a "venerated (if sometimes fetishized) signification of liberatory desire and possibility". In 2008, a Bucknell University professor included Shakur in a course on "African-American heroes"—along with figures such as Harriet Tubman, Sojourner Truth, John Henry, Malcolm X, and Angela Davis. Her autobiography is studied together with those of Angela Davis and Elaine Brown, the only women activists of the Black Power movement who have published book-length autobiographies. Rutgers University professor H. Bruce Franklin, who excerpts Shakur's book in a class on "Crime and Punishment in American Literature," describes her as a "revolutionary fighter against imperialism."

In 2015, Black Lives Matter Global Network Foundation co-founder Alicia Garza wrote: "When I use Assata's powerful demand in my organizing work, I always begin by sharing where it comes from, sharing about Assata's significance to the Black Liberation Movement, what its political purpose and message is, and why it's important in our context." Upon Assata's death, Black Lives Matter Grassroots Inc. vowed to fight in her memory, and Black Lives Matter organizer Malkia Cyril expressed sorrow, stating, "The world in this era needs the kind of courage and radical love she practiced if we are going to survive it". The Chicago-based Black activist group Assata's Daughters is named in her honor. In April 2017, former San Francisco 49ers quarterback Colin Kaepernick's foundation donated $25,000 to the group. The National Conference of Black Lawyers and Mos Def are among the professional organizations and entertainers to support Assata Shakur; the "Hands Off Assata" campaign is organized by Dream Hampton.

A documentary film about Shakur, Eyes of The Rainbow, written and directed by Cuban filmmaker Gloria Rolando, appeared in 1997. The official premiere of the film in Havana in 2004 was promoted by Casa de las Américas, the main cultural forum of the Cuban government. Assata aka Joanne Chesimard is a 2008 biographical film directed by Fred Baker. The film premiered at the San Diego Black Film Festival and starred Assata Shakur herself.

Numerous musicians have composed and recorded songs about her or dedicated to her: Common recorded "A Song for Assata" on his album Like Water for Chocolate (2000) after traveling to Havana to meet with Shakur personally. Nas listed her name in the booklet of his album Untitled, among important black figures who inspired the album. Digable Planets, The Underachievers and X-Clan have also recorded songs about Shakur. Shakur has been described as a "rap music legend" and a "minor cause celebre". Actress Teyana Taylor said that her character in the 2025 movie, One Battle After Another, was based on Shakur.

=== Controversies related to honoring Shakur's legacy ===
On December 12, 2006, the Chancellor of the City University of New York, Matthew Goldstein, directed City College's president, Gregory H. Williams, to remove the "unauthorized and inappropriate" designation of the "Guillermo Morales/Assata Shakur Community and Student Center", which was named by students in 1989. A student group won the right to use the lounge after a campus shutdown over proposed tuition increases. CUNY was sued by student and alumni groups after removing the plaque. As of April 7, 2010, the presiding judge has ruled that the issues of students' free speech and administrators' immunity from suit "deserve a trial".

Following controversy, in 1995, Borough of Manhattan Community College renamed a scholarship that had previously been named for Shakur. Black NJ State Trooper Anthony Reed, who has left the force, sued the police force because, among other things, persons had hung posters of Shakur, altered to include Reed's badge number, in a Newark barracks. He felt it was intended to insult him, as she had killed an officer, and that the act was "racist in nature".

In 2015, New Jersey's Kean University dropped hip-hop artist Common as a commencement speaker because of police complaints. Members of the State Troopers Fraternal Association of New Jersey expressed their anger over Common's "A Song For Assata". In July 2017, the Women's March official Twitter feed celebrated Shakur's birthday, leading to criticism from some media outlets.

Upon her death, the Chicago Teachers' Union released a post on Twitter honoring her, which received immediate criticism for commemorating a convicted murderer whose crime left a police officer dead. Among others, New Jersey Governor Phil Murphy labeled the CTU's post as "shameful and depraved," though others such as former Ohio state senator Nina Turner and the Democratic Socialists of America released similar statements commemorating Shakur's life and celebrating her actions.
