= Sundiata Acoli =

American political activist (born 1937)

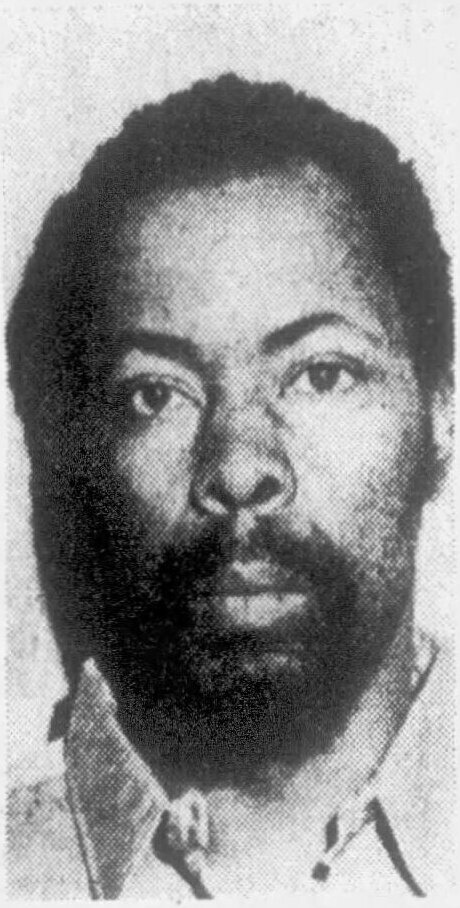
- Mugshot of Acoli on May 3, 1973
- Born: Clark Edward Squire; January 14, 1937 (age 89); Decatur, Texas, U.S.
- Education: Prairie View A&M University
- Status: Paroled
- Conviction: First degree murder
- Penalty: Life imprisonment

Details
- Date apprehended: May 4, 1973; served for 49 years, 22 days until he was paroled on May 26, 2022.

Sundiata Acoli (born January 14, 1937, as Clark Edward Squire) is an American political activist who was a member of the Black Panther Party and the Black Liberation Army. He was sentenced to life in prison in 1974 for murdering a New Jersey state trooper. Acoli was granted parole in 2022 at the age of 85.

== Early life ==
Acoli was born on January 14, 1937, in Decatur, Texas, and raised in Vernon, Texas. He graduated from high school in Texas at the age of 15, and graduated from Prairie View A&M University in 1956 with a degree in mathematics at age 19. After university, he became a computer analyst for NASA, working at Edwards Air Force Base in California. In 1963 he moved to New York City, becoming involved in the civil rights movement, before moving again in the summer of 1964 to Mississippi to continue his activism.

Acoli was radicalised by the assassination of Martin Luther King in April 1968 and that same year joined the Harlem chapter of the Black Panther Party as its finance minister. He was arrested on April 2, 1969, in the Panther 21 conspiracy case, in which members were accused of planning coordinated bombing and long-range rifle attacks on two police stations and an education office in New York City. A group called Computer People for Peace raised $50,000 bail for him but it was rejected by the judge. Acoli and the other defendants were ultimately acquitted of all charges in that case in 1971.

== New Jersey Turnpike shooting ==
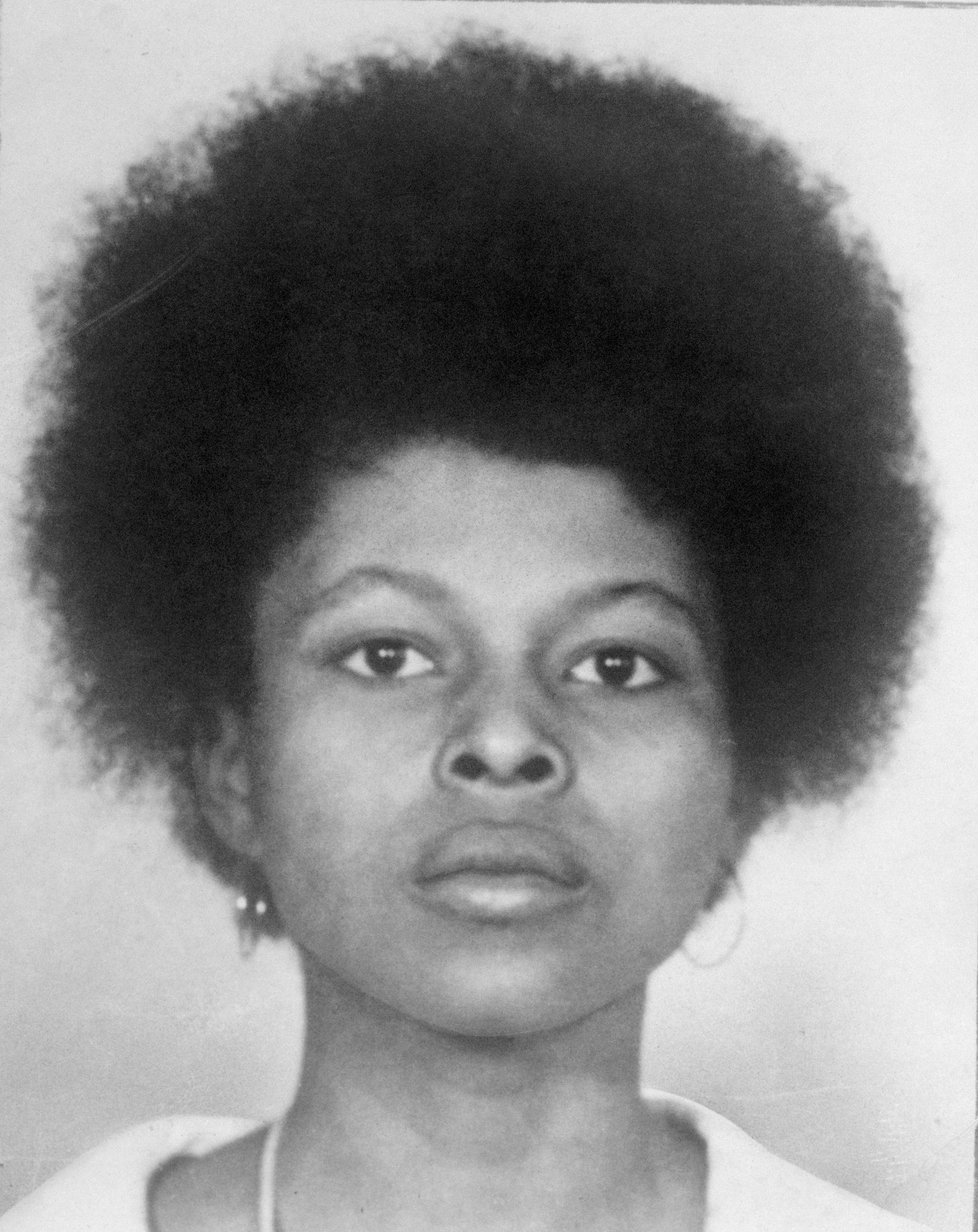
Assata Shakur (pictured in 1971), who accompanied Acoli and Zayd Malik Shakur on the night of May 2, 1973

On May 2, 1973, at about 12:45 a.m., Acoli, along with Zayd Malik Shakur (born James F. Costan) and Assata Shakur (born JoAnne Chesimard), were stopped on the New Jersey Turnpike in East Brunswick for driving with a broken tail light by State Trooper James Harper, backed up by Trooper Werner Foerster in a second patrol vehicle. The vehicle was also exceeding the speed limit. Recordings of Trooper Harper calling the dispatcher were played at the trials of both Acoli and Assata Shakur. The stop occurred 200 yards (183 m) south of what was then the Turnpike Authority administration building. Acoli was driving the two-door vehicle, Assata Shakur was seated in the right front seat, and Zayd Shakur was in the right rear seat. (Note: Note that the New York Times source given here reverses the roles of Zayd Shakur and Acoli.) Trooper Harper asked the driver for identification, asked him to get out of the car, and questioned him at the rear of the vehicle.

It is at this point, with the questioning of Acoli, that the accounts of the confrontation begin to differ (see the witnesses section of the Assata Shakur article). However, in the ensuing shootout, Trooper Foerster was shot twice in the head with his own gun and killed, Zayd Shakur was killed, and Assata Shakur and Trooper Harper were wounded.

According to initial police statements, at this point one or more of the suspects began firing with automatic handguns and Trooper Foerster fired four times before falling mortally wounded. At Acoli's trial, Harper testified that the gunfight started "seconds" after Foerster arrived at the scene. At this trial, Harper said that Foerster reached into the vehicle, pulled out and held up an automatic pistol and ammunition magazine, and said "Jim, look what I found", while facing Harper at the rear of the vehicle. At this point, Assata Shakur and Zayd Shakur were ordered to put their hands on their laps and not to move; Harper said that Assata Shakur then reached down to the right of her right leg, pulled out a pistol, and shot him in the shoulder, after which he retreated to behind his vehicle. Questioned by prosecutor C. Judson Hamlin, Harper said he saw Foerster shot just as Assata Shakur was felled by bullets from Harper's gun. In his opening statement to a jury, Hamlin said that Acoli shot Foerster with a .38 caliber automatic pistol and then used Foerster's own gun to "execute him". According to the testimony of State Police investigators, two jammed semi-automatic pistols were discovered near Foerster's body.

In Shakur's version of events, she says she was shot and wounded with her hands up and couldn't have killed Foerster. Acoli said at the time that he was hit by a bullet, blacked out and couldn't remember what happened.

Acoli then drove the car (a white Pontiac LeMans with Vermont license plates)—which contained Assata Shakur, who was wounded, and Zayd Shakur, who was dead or dying—5 miles (8 km) down the road. The vehicle was chased by three patrol cars and the booths down the turnpike were alerted. Acoli then exited the car and, after being ordered to halt by a trooper, fled into the woods as the trooper emptied his gun. Assata Shakur then walked towards the trooper with her bloodied arms raised in surrender. Acoli was captured after a 36-hour manhunt—involving 400 people, state police helicopters, and bloodhounds. Zayd Shakur's body was found in a nearby gully along the road.

== Prison ==
A jury convicted Acoli of first-degree murder in 1974 and sentenced him to life without the possibility of parole until after 25 years served. Upon entering New Jersey State Prison he was subsequently confined to a new and specially created Management Control Unit (MCU), where he remained for almost five years.

In September 1979, Acoli was transferred to Marion, Illinois, federal prison. In July 1987 he was transferred to the federal penitentiary at Leavenworth, Kansas. In the fall of 1992, Acoli was denied parole. He was up for parole again in 2012. On September 29, 2014, a New Jersey state appeals court officially granted Acoli's request for parole, though the state of New Jersey appealed this ruling. A higher court reversed this ruling in February 2017. On November 21, 2017, the appeals board denied parole, and Acoli was not scheduled to be eligible to apply again until 2032 when he would have been 94 years old. However, the New Jersey Supreme Court ordered that he be made eligible to apply for parole again sooner, and he was ultimately granted parole in May 2022 at the age of 85.

== In popular culture ==
Sundiata Acoli is hailed in the song "Sunshine" by hip hop artist Yasiin Bey alongside Mumia Abu Jamal and Assata Shakur. He is also given a "revolutionary salute" at the end of the Dead Prez song "I Have A Dream, Too", along with Zayd Shakur and Assata Shakur.
