= She'ar Yashuv Cohen =

Israeli rabbi

Rabbi She'ar Yashuv Cohen
- אליהו יוסף שאר ישוב כהן
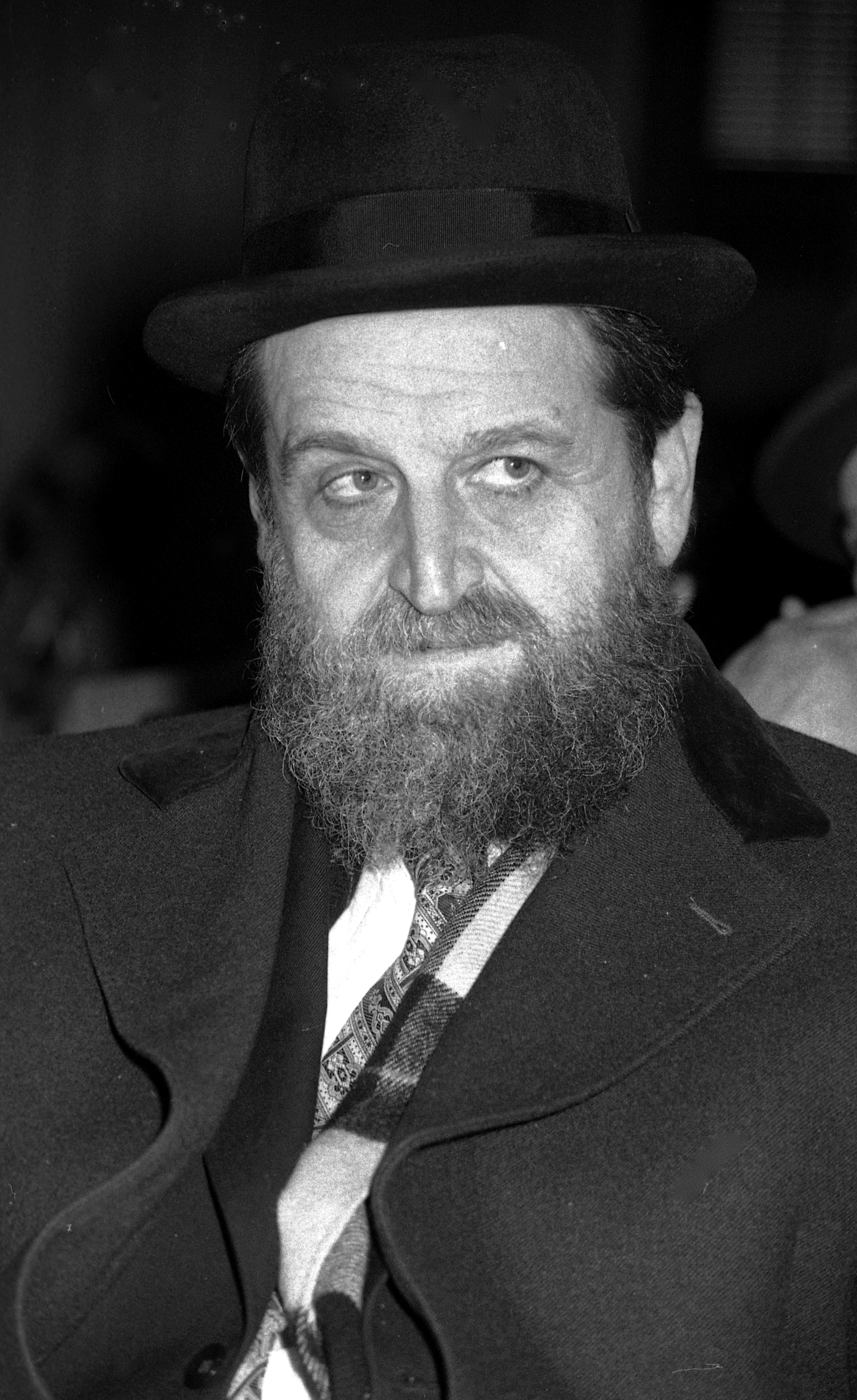
- Rabbi She'ar Yashuv Cohen in 1983
- Title: Chief Rabbi of Haifa

Personal life
- Born: 4 November 1927 Jerusalem
- Died: 5 September 2016 (aged 88) Haifa
- Spouse: Naomi
- Children: 1
- Parent(s): Rabbi David Cohen and Sara

Religious life
- Religion: Judaism
- Denomination: Orthodox Judaism

Eliyahu Yosef She'ar-Yashuv Cohen (Hebrew: אליהו יוסף שאר ישוב כהן; 4 November 1927 – 5 September 2016) was the Ashkenazi Chief Rabbi of Haifa, Israel and the President of its rabbinical courts (1975–2011).

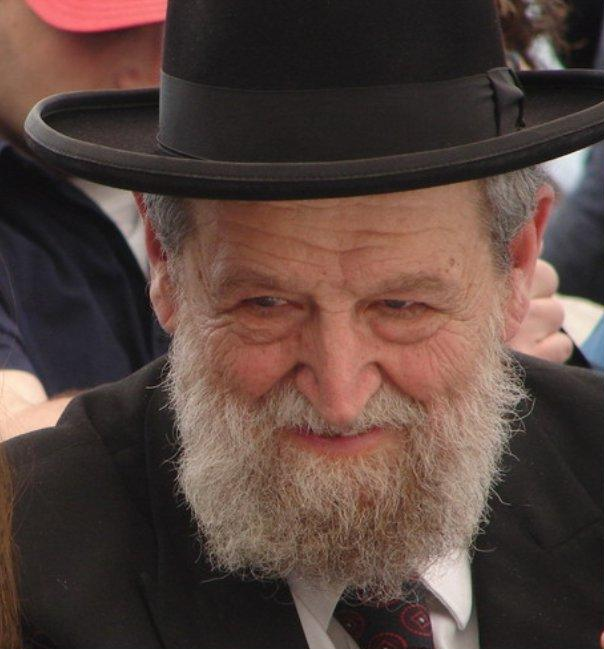
Rabbi She'ar Yashuv Cohen in 2007

== Biography ==
Eliyahu Yosef She'ar-Yashuv Cohen born in Jerusalem, an 18th-generation descendant in a family of rabbis and Torah scholars. The name "She'ar-Yashuv" (Hebrew: שאר ישוב, lit. 'a few/a remnant will return') is based on the eponymous son of the prophet Isaiah (see Isaiah 7:3). His father was Rabbi David Cohen who was known as the "Nazir of Jerusalem." His mother was Sarah Etkin, among the founders of Omen, a religious women's organization that became the Emunah movement.

Cohen attended Talmud Torah Geulah and studied at the yeshivot "Torat Yerushalayim," "Mercaz Harav," and "Etz Hayyim." In his youth he became close to Abraham Isaac Kook. Yeshayahu Hadari, co-founder of Yeshivat Hakotel, said that Kook used to attend the melaveh malkah at the Cohen home and Eliyahu would play the violin.

Cohen and his sister were encouraged to become Nazirites, but they chose not to follow in their father's path, apart from remaining vegetarians. When he was growing up, Cohen's hair was not cut, he wore canvas shoes, and he followed the Nazirite practices of his father. At the age of 12, a special Beit Din of Jerusalem rabbis convened in his house to release him from the Nazirite vow. Even afterwards, out of an idealism for the holiness of life, he did not eat meat including fish, nor did he drink wine.

Cohen was married to Dr. Naomi G. Cohen, daughter of Rabbi Dr. Hayyim Shimshon Herbert S. Goldstein, a rabbinic leader and long-time President of the Union of Orthodox Jewish Congregations of America and other national organizations, and granddaughter of the philanthropist Harry Fischel. His sister Rabbanit Tzefiya, was married to Rabbi Shlomo Goren, the Ashkenazi Chief Rabbi of Israel. The Cohens had a daughter, Eliraz Kraus, six grandchildren, and several great-grandchildren.

== Military service ==
In 1948, while studying at Mercaz Harav, Cohen joined Brit Hahashmona'im, a resistance movement that fought against the British mandate. He was also an active member of the Haganah. With the support of his father and the Rosh Yeshiva of Mercaz Harav, Tzvi Yehuda Kook, he led a group of youths who fought as part of the Hish in the 1947–1949 Palestine war, and helped to found the first military-religious core group that developed into a Yeshivat Hesder.

During the 1947–1949 War of Independence, Cohen defended Jerusalem and Gush Etzion, where he fought with Etzel for the Old City of Jerusalem. He accompanied convoys of soldiers to Jerusalem and Gush Etzion, and also fought to defend the Gush. He was severely injured in the fighting to defend the Old City, and when the Jewish Quarter fell, he was captured by the Arab Legion of the Jordanian Army. Together with the survivors of Gush Etzion and the defenders of the Jewish Quarter, he was taken to Amman and then to the prison camp in Mafraq. In prison, his leg was operated on, but he remained handicapped. He became one of the leaders of the POWs, and earned the respect of both British and Arab commanders in the camp.

Cohen served in the IDF for seven years and reached the rank of Sgan Aluf (lieutenant colonel). He participated in talks with the Jordanians on returning the remains of Jews killed in Gush Etzion during the war. He also participated in an IDF delegation to the United States, and served in senior positions in the army rabbinate, including army chaplain and chief rabbi of the Israeli Air Force.

Cohen volunteered to fight in the Yom Kippur War and served as Chaplain of the unit that crossed the Suez Canal.

== Political and public office ==
Cohen held an honorary degree in law from the law faculty of Hebrew University. He specialized in legal advice on rabbinic rulings. He researched Israeli law and its harmonization with the laws relating to the Land of Israel. Afterwards, he served as the deputy mayor of Jerusalem in the Mafdal (NRP) party, and continued in this role after the city was unified in the Six-Day War in 1967.

Several years after the death of Yehoshua Kaniel in 1975, Cohen replaced him as Ashkenazi Chief Rabbi of Haifa. He is also President of the Harry Fischel Institute for Talmudic Research and Torah Law. He founded the Midrasha HaGevoha LaTorah ("Advanced Torah Institute") and the Ariel Institute in Jerusalem. In 1983 and 1993, he was a candidate for position of Ashkenazi Chief Rabbi of Israel. He was a senior rabbinical adviser to the Chief Rabbinate of Israel. He was the president of the Jerusalem Lodge of Bnai Brith, and of the Bnai Tsion "Sons of Zion" association in Israel. He was elected twice as President of the Jewish Law Association, and three consecutive times as a member of the Board of Governors of the University of Haifa. In 1999 Bar-Ilan University conferred upon him an honorary doctorate. When Rabbi Cohen reached the age of 80, the City Council of Haifa unanimously conferred upon him the title: "Honorary Citizen."

Several years ago, the Jerusalem D.A. summoned Rabbi Cohen to a hearing in connection with the alleged improper running of "Jewish Studies" courses for members of the police and other security personnel. These courses had been conducted for several years in Jerusalem under the auspices of institutes presided over by the former Chief Rabbis of Israel, Rabbi Ovadia Yosef and Rabbi Mordechai Eliyahu. At the request of the then Chief Chaplain of the Northern Command of the Police, the Ariel Institutes of Haifa, under the presidency of Rabbi Cohen, agreed to host a parallel program for those living and serving in the northern part of the country. While the D.A. did not consider Rabbi Cohen to have been involved in the running of the program, he reprimanded him for having allowed the Ariel Institutes to grant a scholarship to the Yeshiva student son of the initiator and head of the Haifa program, labeling it as a bribe. Rabbi Cohen did not wish to go to a court of law to contend the allegation, particularly since he was already well over the mandatory age of retirement. The D.A. agreed not to press charges, on condition that the Rabbi would officially announce his retirement. He became Chief Rabbi Emeritus.

== Interfaith dialogue ==
Cohen was active in interfaith dialogue. He was awarded Israel's Sovlanut (tolerance) award in 1991. He served as a chief of the senior council for dialogue between the Chief Rabbinate of Israel and the Vatican, and recently became chair of the council for dialogue between Judaism and Islam; he acted as an emissary of the Israel Chief Rabbinate to interfaith meetings and was on the Board of World Religious Leaders for The Elijah Interfaith Institute.

In October 2008, Rabbi Cohen was invited by Pope Benedict XVI, to lecture before the International Catholic Church Synod in Rome, that is the supreme body of the Catholic Church, where he presented the Jewish view of the place of the Hebrew Bible (Old Testament) in the Jewish religion and liturgy. He used the occasion to oppose plans to beatify Pope Pius XII.

On 28 January 2009, the Chief Rabbinate of Israel broke off official ties with the Vatican indefinitely in protest over the Pope's decision to lift the excommunication of controversial bishop Richard Williamson, a member of the Society of Saint Pius X. Shear Yashuv Cohen, chairman of the Rabbinate's commission, told The Jerusalem Post that he expected Williamson to publicly retract his statements before meetings could be renewed.

Cohen later reconciled with Pope Benedict in March 2009.

Cohen led the Jewish delegation of the Chief Rabbinate of Israel to the ninth meeting of the Commission for Dialogue between Jews and Catholics in Rome from 17 to 20 January 2010. He also chaired the Jewish delegation in the 11th Bilateral Commission meeting in March 2012.

== Views and opinions ==
In a March 2005 article in Makor Rishon he wrote:

The State of Israel is dear and beloved to me as the first flowering of our redemption [Reishit Tzemihat Ge'ulateinu]. Especially for this reason, I cannot avoid... expressing my clear position that the "State of Israel" is not the supreme value in our lives, in terms of being a goal unto itself. There are more important demands that take priority over this, since surely everyone who seeks to be in the State of Israel aims to protect them and guard them...

Cohen continues with an appeal to then-prime minister Ariel Sharon:

It is asked: Why uproot the settlements? Why can they not exist in a Palestinian state... and continue to observe all the commandments of inhabiting the Holy Land, as our fathers and forefathers did throughout the generations...?

During the evacuation of Gush Katif, Cohen strongly criticized the government of Israel: "Whoever uproots Jewish settlements in the land of Israel and God forbid will even cause destruction of synagogues and uprooting graves, will not be cleansed in this world nor in the afterlife... this is the highest form of evil and cruelty..."

He later added, "I cannot consider an act more cruel and more evil than what the government of Israel did this week in Gush Katif, like this with one hand. The act of demolition of a synagogue is something that is unheard of among nations of the world... There is no sin greater than this."

== Vegetarianism ==
Cohen remained a vegetarian throughout his entire life. He was a patron of the International Jewish Vegetarian Society.

== Published works ==
- חקרי הלכה - קובץ תשובות, פסקים וקונטרסי הלכה דברים שכתב, חיבר ופרסם במשך שנות כהונתו ברבנות העיר חיפה
- שי כהן - שעורים, תשובות, ברורים וחקרי הלכה, הארות במשפט התורה ובמחשבת ישראל
- משנת הנזיר - עיקרי משנתו ותולדות חייו של הרב דוד כהן (אביו של הרב שאר ישוב כהן), מתוך יומניו, עם מבואות ופרקי זכרונות
- בסתר המדרגה - דברים מתוך משנת מרן נזיר אלקים הרב דוד כהן ומבואות לשיטתו
- יונתי בחגוי הסלע - חיבור שחיבר לעילוי נשמת אמו, הרבנית שרה כהן
- שלשה שותפים - להארת דמותם של: רבו הרב אברהם יצחק הכהן קוק, אביו הנזיר הרב דוד כהן ואמו הרבנית שרה כהן

== See also ==
- Jewish vegetarianism
