= Naomi G. Cohen =

Israeli Jewish scholar (1930–2022)

- Naomi G. Cohen
- Born: Naomi Nechama Goldstein; 6 August 1930; New York, NY
- Died: 13 February 2022; Jerusalem, Israel
- Occupations: Scholar of Jewish philosophy, women's activist
- Spouse: Rabbi She'ar Yashuv Cohen
- Parent(s): Rabbi Herbert Goldstein, Rebecca Fischel Goldstein

Naomi Goldstein Cohen (1930–2022) was an authority on Jewish thought and history, especially Philo, a scholar who pioneered the teaching of Talmud to women, and an innovator among religious feminists in Israel. She helped to found several women's organizations including Emunah, the Israel Women's Network and Kolech. She was awarded several honors for her initiatives and actions, among them the "Exemplary Woman of Haifa" award, Yekirat Haifa (Worthy Citizen of Haifa) Yekirat Kolech (Worthy of Kolech), and a certificate of appreciation from the "Mavoi Satum" organization for her contributions to helping women whose husbands refuse to give them a divorce.

She was the wife of Rabbi She'ar Yeshuv Cohen, who became the chief Ashkenazi rabbi of Haifa in 1975.

She died on 13 February 2022 and is buried on the Mount of Olives.

== Education and career ==
Cohen was born in New York City on 6 August 1930, the youngest child of Rabbi Dr. Herbert (Haim Shimshon) Goldstein and Rebecca Fischel, and the granddaughter of the philanthropist Harry Fischel. Rabbi Goldstein was the Rabbi of the West Side Institutional Synagogue in Manhattan and professor of homiletics and practical rabbinics at Yeshiva University.

She was a student in the first class of the Jewish day school, Ramaz, founded in 1937.

Upon her graduation in 1949, following the establishment of the State of Israel, Cohen moved to Jerusalem to study at the Hebrew University of Jerusalem. She enrolled in a direct-to-Master's program in the Humanities and studied Classical Studies, (including Greek) Bible, and the History of the Jewish People She received her Master's degree in 1965.

Her father-in-law, Rabbi David Cohen, known as the Nazir (Nazirite), encouraged her continue on to a PhD and to study Philo of Alexandria in the original Greek (since she had studied it as part of her Master's degree). They shared the idea that Philo should be "returned" to the Jewish bookshelf and not only studied from the perspective of Christian scholars.

She completed her dissertation at Hebrew University in 1969 on the topic "Jewish Names and their Significance in Asia Minor during the Hellenistic and Roman Periods," and received her degree in 1971.

She taught in the departments of Jewish Philosophy and Jewish Thought at Tel Aviv University and at the University of Haifa. She was later a senior research fellow at the University of Haifa. The main topics she taught were the writings and philosophy of Philo of Alexandria, Hellenistic Judaism, Judeo-Greek traditions, and Midrash. She also researched the history of education and the prayer book.

== Activism and feminism ==
Cohen was a pioneer of religious feminism in Israel and was active in various frameworks dedicated to advancing the status of women. In the 1950s, while living in Jerusalem and at the request of Sarah Herzog, the wife of Chief Rabbi Yitzchak Herzog, (and grandmother of the Yitzchak Herzog, the 6th president of the State of Israel) she founded and ran the Young Women's Circle of the Omen Mizrachi movement, (later the Emunah organization), serving first as chairperson and later as president. She also served on the national board of Emunah. After she moved to Haifa, she founded the Haifa chapter of Omen, (later Emunah).

In 1984 together with Alice Shalvi, she helped found Israel Women's Network and was on the founding board. She was a co-founder of the Association of Academic Women in Israel, and a member of the Ne'emanei Torah Va'Avodah movement. She participated in the founding conference of the Kolech organization in 1998 and served on its executive council for several years. She was a signatory on its document of founding and lectured at each of its annual conferences. She was also very involved in Mavoi Satum, which provides support and legal representation in Rabbinic courts for women whose husband's refuse to give them a Jewish divorce.

She also established and taught a Talmud class for women in Haifa which ran for close to forty years, starting in 1978. It was the first one in Israel to be taught on a regular basis and helped legitimize women's study of Talmud.

== Awards ==
In addition to her academic work Cohen was active in the fields of culture, social welfare, and the advancement of women, for which she was honored with several awards.

1982 awarded the "Woman of Exemplary Merit of Haifa".

2008 awarded Yekirat Kolech by Kolech.

2008 received a Certificate of Appreciation of Mavoi Satum.

2010 awarded Yekirat Haifa (Worthy Person of City of Haifa).

== Writings ==
In addition to her teaching and voluntary activities, Cohen wrote many papers and also created teaching materials for students and teachers to teach history in schools.

=== Books ===
- Philo Judaeus: His Universe of Discourse, ISBN 978-3-8204-1650-3, (1995) Publisher: Peter Lang
- Philo's Scriptures: Citations from the Prophets and Writings: Evidence for a Haftarah Cycle in Second Temple Judaism, ISBN 978-90-04-16312-6, (2007) Publisher: Brill
- The Prophetic Books in Alexandria: the Evidence from Philo Judaeus in Prophets, Prophecy, and Prophetic Texts in Second Temple Judaism, ISBN 978-0-567-02780-1, (2006) 166-193 Edited by Michael H. Floyd and Robert D. Haak. New York: T&T Clark

=== Articles ===
==== Key Philo articles ====
- The Jewish Dimension of Philo's Judaism—An Elucidation of de Spec. Leg. IV 132–150, Journal of Jewish Studies Volume 38, Issue 2 (1987)
- Earliest evidence of the Haftarah cycle for the Sabbaths between the 17th of Tammuz and Sukkoth in Philo. Journal of Jewish Studies 48,2 (1997) 225-249
- Philo's "literal meaning" and rabbinic "peshat". World Congress of Jewish Studies 11,A (1993) 171-178
- Philo's Cher. 40–52, Zohar III 31a, and BT Hag. 16a, Journal of Jewish Studies Volume 57, Issue 2 (2006)
- Philo Judeaus and the Torah True Library Tradition: A Journal of Orthodox Jewish Thought , Vol. 41, No. 3 (FALL 2008), pp. 31-48
- Philo's Place in the Chain of Jewish Tradition, Tradition: A Journal of Orthodox Jewish Thought , Vol. 44, No. 2 (SUMMER 2011), pp. 9-17

==== Talmud articles ====
- Women and the Study of Talmud, Tradition: A Journal of Orthodox Jewish Thought, Fall 1988, Vol. 24, No. 1 (Fall 1988), pp. 28-37
- Religious Legislation in Israel, Tradition: A Journal of Orthodox Jewish Thought, Vol. 31, No. 4 (Summer 1997), pp. 34-38
- Bruria in the Bavli and in Rashi "Avodah Zarah" 18B, Tradition: A Journal of Orthodox Jewish Thought, Vol. 48, No. 2/3 (SUMMER-FALL 2015), pp. 29-40
- Rabbi Meir, a descendant of Anatolian proselytes. Journal of Jewish Studies 23 (1972) 51-59

==== Other articles ====
- Josephus and Scripture: Is Josephus' Treatment of the Scriptural Narrative Similar Throughout the "Antiquities" I-XI? Jewish Quarterly Review, 54,4 (1964) 311-332
- Jewish Names as Cultural Indicators in Antiquity, Journal for the Study of Judaism in the Persian, Hellenistic, and Roman Period, Vol. 7, No. 2 (1976), pp. 97-128 (32 pages) Publisher: Brill
- From Nabi to Mal'ak to "Ancient Figure" Journal of Jewish Studies Volume 36, Issue 1 Apr 1985
- Taryag and the Noahide Commandments, Journal of Jewish Studies Volume 43, Issue 1Apr 1992
- The Names of the Translators in the Letter of Aristeas: A Study in the Dynamics of Cultural Transition, Journal for the Study of Judaism in the Persian, Hellenistic and Roman Period, 15 (1984) 32-64 Publisher: Brill
- Cohen, Naomi G. "The Orthodox Woman: Continuity and Change" (Hebrew). In Women in Judaism. Discussion Papers 2. Ramat Gan: 1999.

== Video ==
https://www.youtube.com/watch?v=NZhG5RR6-C4 (Hebrew)
