= Shimshon Dovid Pincus =

Israeli-American rabbi

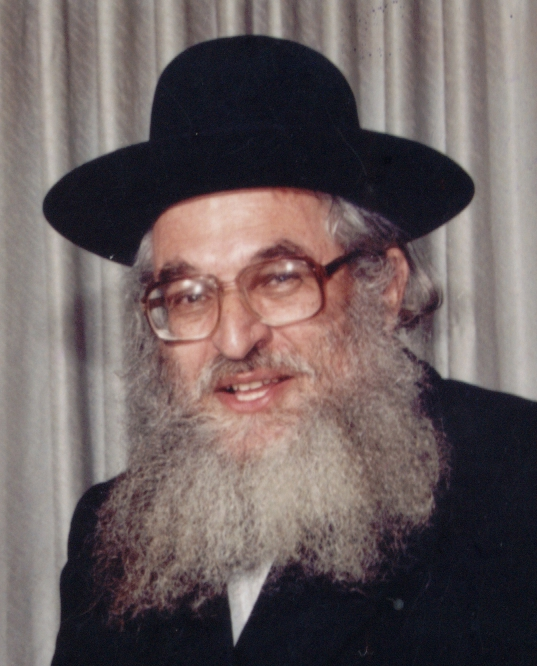
- Pincus in 1990
- Born: August 1944
- Died: April 12, 2001 (aged 56); Car accident
- Burial place: Jerusalem

Shimshon Dovid Pincus (Hebrew: שמשון דוד פינקוס; August 1944 – April 12, 2001) was an Israeli haredi (ultra-orthodox) rabbi of American origin who worked in Ofakim.

== Biography ==
Pincus learned in Beth Hatalmud Rabbinical College, a yeshiva in New York City under Aryeh Leib Malin. Afterwards, he moved to Israel to learn in Brisk yeshiva under Berel Soloveitchik, the son of the Brisker Rav. He studied Kabbalah with Yaakov Moshe Hillel. After his marriage he lived in Bnei Brak and then in the Negev. At this time, he was the Mashgiach ruchani (dean) of the yeshiva in Ofakim. Afterwards, he became the rosh yeshiva in Yeruham. Pincus was Chief Rabbi of Ofakim for over twenty years.

Pincus and his wife, Chaya had 12 children. In 2001, at the age of 56, he was killed in a car accident, along with his wife and 18-year-old daughter, Miriam. They are buried in Jerusalem.

== Works ==
Among his books* are:

- Sha'arim B'Tefillah
- Breichos B'Chesbon
- Shabbos Malkesa
- Hagada Shel Pesach, Tiferes Shimshon
- Sichos HaRav Shimshon Dovid Pincus
- Tiferes Avos
- Ohel Miriam
- Nefesh Shimshon - Shabbos Kodesh
- Nefesh Shimshon - HaTorah U'Kinyana
- Nefesh Shimshon - Galus U'Nechama
- Nefesh Shimshon - Tehillim
- Nefesh Shimshon - Seder HaTefillah
- Nefesh Shimshon - Sha'ari Emunah
- Nefesh Shimshon - Pesach, Sefiras Ha'Omer, and Shavous
- Nefesh Shimshon - Al HaTorah
- Moadei Hashanah - Elul and Rosh Hashanah
- Nefesh Chaya - The Unique Avodas HaShem of the Jewish Woman

'*'These are translations of books that he wrote in Hebrew.
