= Rebecca Fischel Goldstein =

Rabbi's wife and community activist

Rebecca Fischel Goldstein (March 1, 1891 – June 4, 1961) was an entrepreneurial American Jewish communal leader in New York City. She was the wife of Rabbi Herbert S. Goldstein, founder of the (West Side) Institutional Synagogue, and the daughter of philanthropist Harry Fischel and Jane Brass Fischel. She held leadership positions in Jewish women's organizations, many of which she helped found. Through her involvement in initiatives relating to Jewish religious life, education, and communal affairs she helped define the role of the Orthodox American Rabbi's wife. She was often called a "powerhouse Rebbetzin" (rabbi's wife).

== Early life and education ==
Goldstein was born in New York City on March 1, 1891, the second daughter of Harry Fischel, a prominent Jewish philanthropist, and Jane Brass Fischel, who was involved in the women's suffrage movement.

Goldstein attended Barnard College (Class of 1912) and then attended the newly created Jewish Theological Seminary's Teacher's Institute, graduating in the first class.

She married her husband Herbert S. Goldstein in 1915 and they had 4 children, Simeon, Gabriel, Josephine Reichel, and Naomi G. Cohen.

== Defining the role of the American Orthodox Rabbi's wife ==
Rebecca Goldstein viewed her primary role as her husband's help mate in building the Institutional Synagogue and worked side by side with him. According to Shuly Rubin Schwartz, with the huge influx of immigrants from Eastern Europe at the turn of the twentieth century, rabbis faced challenges to keep them involved in Jewish life and the synagogue. The challenge was often greater regarding their American-born and educated children. Rabbi Goldstein and his wife understood this and worked together as a team to attract and involve young congregants and provide Jewish education for them.

The Institutional Center was created primarily as a synagogue and Jewish school but also as a community center. Founded in 1917 in an old theater on West 116th Street, it also had a pool in the basement, and became known as "the shul with the pool". The thought was that this might attract them to stay/return for synagogue services.

While her husband handled the religious and educational functions, Goldstein often joined in the pastoral work with congregants. She also attracted young people by inviting them to Friday night dinners in their home, and held Shabbat afternoon "at homes". She founded the Daughters of the Institutional Synagogue to provide mentoring, support, and Jewish education for young Jewish women, and was viewed as a mother figure.

She believed that Judaism should be the center of women's lives and founded the Women’s League of the Institutional Synagogue, the first Sisterhood in an Orthodox synagogue, to involve the women in the synagogue. During World War I, women were involved in knitting sweaters and socks for soldiers and making garments for the wounded. After the war activities included holiday-specific preparations of the synagogue and handouts for the children, such as floral decorations on Shavuot, mini-Torahs and candies on Simchat Torah, groggers (noise makers) and hamentachen on Purim, decorations and kiddushes for the Sukkah. Goldstein also organized the women to collect donations for the needy on Passover, organized synagogue and school fundraising events such as bazaars, theater events, and wrote pamphlets to explain Kashrut and other topics of interest to congregants.

Goldstein also set up a Social Service League to help save poor Jewish boys and girls from falling into crime by providing them with religious education and care. She enlisted the help of Jewish Big Brother and Sister organizations.

== Communal and religious leadership ==
Goldstein was active in Jewish communal organizations in New York City.

=== Women's Branch of the OU ===
In 1923 she was one of the founders and president of the Women’s Branch of the Union of Orthodox Jewish Congregations of America (OU) from 1924 to 1936. Its goal was “to re-establish the Jewish home as a sanctuary and to recreate the Jewish mother as the priestess.” Pamphlets distributed by the Women’s Branch explained women’s ritual obligations and presented kosher as the key to developing a spiritually and physically healthy Jewish home. The Women’s Branch published kosher cookbooks to help women keep kosher. She also established a Collegiate Branch for college students as a means to provide additional Jewish education and to help combat intermarriage and assimilation.

In a 1925 address to the Women's Branch Goldstein said, “We are anxious to make every Orthodox Jewess more keenly interested in all things that are Jewish and to stimulate her love for her religion and her people. This, in our opinion, can be done most effectively by means of women’s organizations.”

==== Certification of Kosher Food ====
With the advent of the refrigerator and the spread in the use of frozen and canned goods, the women felt the need to increase the availability of kosher food produced by local and national food companies.

Goldstein and members of the Women's Branch developed the idea of a kosher food certification program where food produced by manufacturers would be supervised and certified that they abided by kosher standards. They created a Kosher Committee which launched a program of “making kosher products available to the housewife". They lobbied the OU to agree to set up a certification system and also reached out to multiple manufacturers to persuade them to substitute kosher ingredients for non-kosher ones.

The first product to receive certification, in 1924, were Sunshine Crackers, manufactured by the Loose-Wiles Biscuit Company. This was followed in 1925 by Heinz's vegetarian beans. In 1927, they developed the OU symbol to appear on products and it is still in use today.

In a 1934 article in the Women's Branch Newsletter, Goldstein wrote: “We were successful in persuading the Sunshine Biscuit Company to establish a kosher department. Twenty-six of Heinz’s ‘57 varieties’ are packed under our supervision . . . This work must of necessity progress slowly, for we must be absolutely certain before our Union can put its stamp on any article . . . .”

=== Hebrew Teacher’s Training School for Girls ===
In 1928 Goldstein was involved in founding the Hebrew Teacher's Training School for Girls to address the lack of trained female teachers who could teach various Jewish topics such as history, tradition, and Hebrew texts, as an alternative to JTS' Teachers Institute (which she had attended). The school was later merged into Yeshiva University.

=== Other activities ===
Goldstein also participated in the Yeshiva University Women's Organization where she helped raise $250,000 for the building of its first student dormitory at Yeshiva University in 1927. She was active in Mizrachi Women's Organization (today AMIT), the Federation of Jewish Women's Organizations, and Hadassah. She also was a director of Home of Daughters of Jacob old age home.

== Death ==
Goldstein died in New York City on June 4, 1961, at the age of 70.

== Memorials ==
In 1961 the West Side Institutional Synagogue created a memorial for Goldstein.

In 1961 the Harry Fischel Institute in Jerusalem created a Rebecca F. Goldstein Loan Fund for Scholars

In 1962 the Harry and Jane Fischel Foundation contributed to the Women’s Branch of the Union of Orthodox Jewish Congregations for educational work in memory of Rebecca F. Goldstein.

In 1964 a Rebecca F. Goldstein kindergarten was established in Jerusalem.

The Yeshiva University Archives is the repository for the Herbert S. Goldstein and Rebecca (Fischel) Goldstein family papers.
