= Binyamin Zeilberger =

Orthodox rabbi from New York City

Rabbi Binyamin Zeilberger
- Zeilberger (at left) with Elya Svei

Personal life
- Born: March 14, 1921 Koenigshaufen, Germany
- Died: October 10, 2005 (aged 84) Brooklyn, New York
- Spouse: Sara Rochel Zeilberger née Kaplan
- Education: Mir Yeshiva (Belarus)

Religious life
- Religion: Judaism
- Denomination: Orthodox Judaism

Jewish leader
- Predecessor: Chaim Vysokier
- Successor: Yehuda Zeilberger
- Yeshiva: Beth Hatalmud Rabbinical College
- Position: Rosh yeshiva
- Yahrtzeit: 7 Tishrei

Rabbi Binyamin Zeilberger (sometimes pronounced Tzahlberger; Hebrew: רב בנימין צלברגר/ציילברגר) was the rosh yeshiva of Beth Hatalmud Rabbinical College in the second half of the twentieth century. He was an alumnus of the Mir Yeshiva in Europe.

== Early life ==
Zeilberger was born in Koenigshaufen, Germany on March 14, 1921. In 1935 he enrolled in the Mir Yeshiva in what is now Belarus, where he shared a room in a boarding house with Aryeh Leib Malin, Yonah Minsker, and Michel Feinstein.

When World War II broke out in 1939 the Mir Yeshiva (and many other yeshivas in Poland) fled to Lithuania. Zeilberger remained with the yeshiva when it moved to Japan in 1941, then to Shanghai, and then in 1947 to the United States where it was reëstablished in Brooklyn.

Zeilberger married Sara Rochel Kaplan.

== Beth Hatalmud Rabbinical College ==
Zeilberger soon joined the Beth Hatalmud Rabbinical College in Bensonhurst, Brooklyn, established in 1950 by older students from the Mir Yeshiva who had also escaped from Europe including Aryeh Leib Malin. Zeilberger later became a rosh yeshiva there and was on the faculty for over fifty years.

== Death ==
Zeilberger died in Brooklyn on October 10, 2005, at the age of 84.

== See also ==
- Yeshivas in World War II
