= Harry Fischel =

American businessman and philanthropist

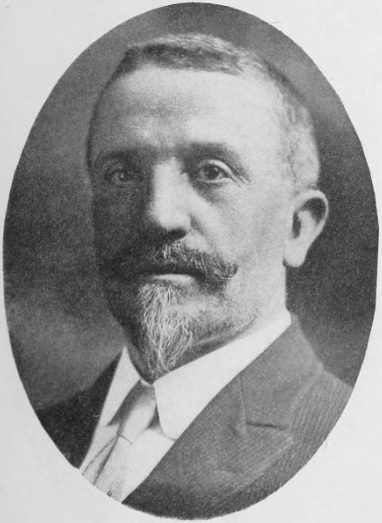
Fischel c. 1914

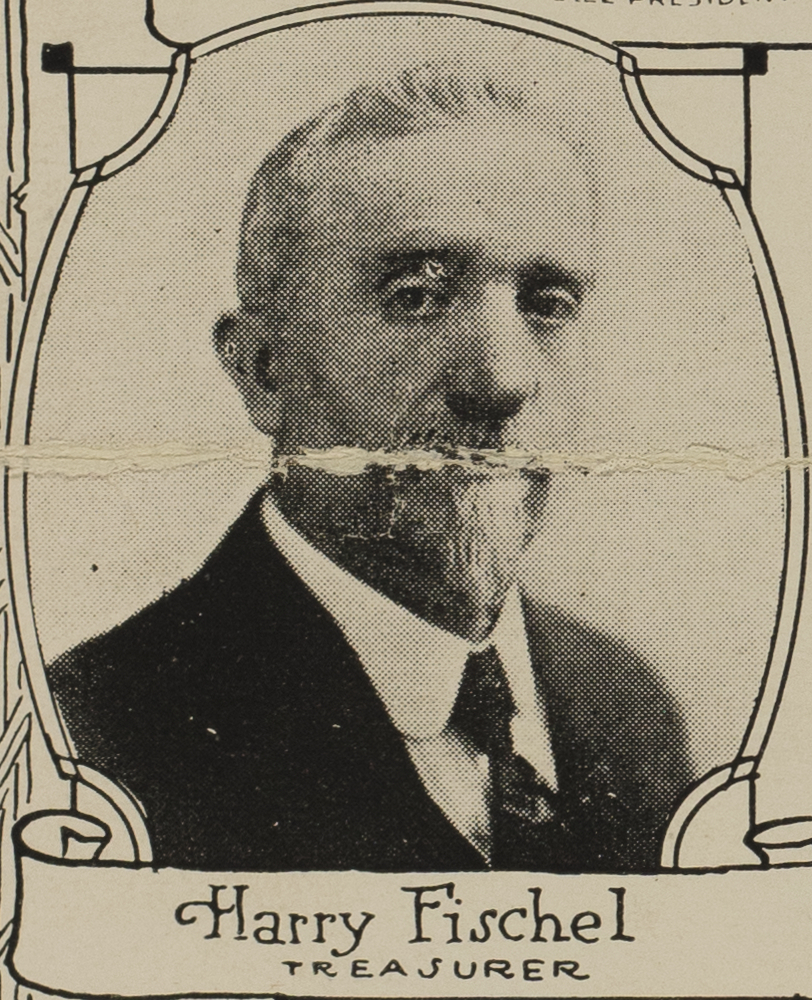
As Treasurer of HIAS c. 1922

Harry Fischel (1865–1948) was an American businessman and philanthropist based in New York City at the turn of the 20th century.

Fischel was one of the leading pioneers in the growth of American Judaism, in general, during the dynamic and precedent-setting first half of the 20th century. He was instrumental in the development of American Jewish Orthodox institutions during that period.

== Biography ==
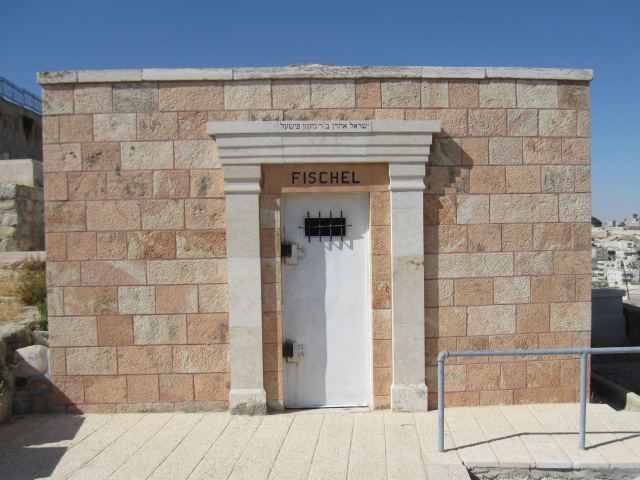
Fischel's family mausoleum in the Mount of Olives Jewish Cemetery, Jerusalem

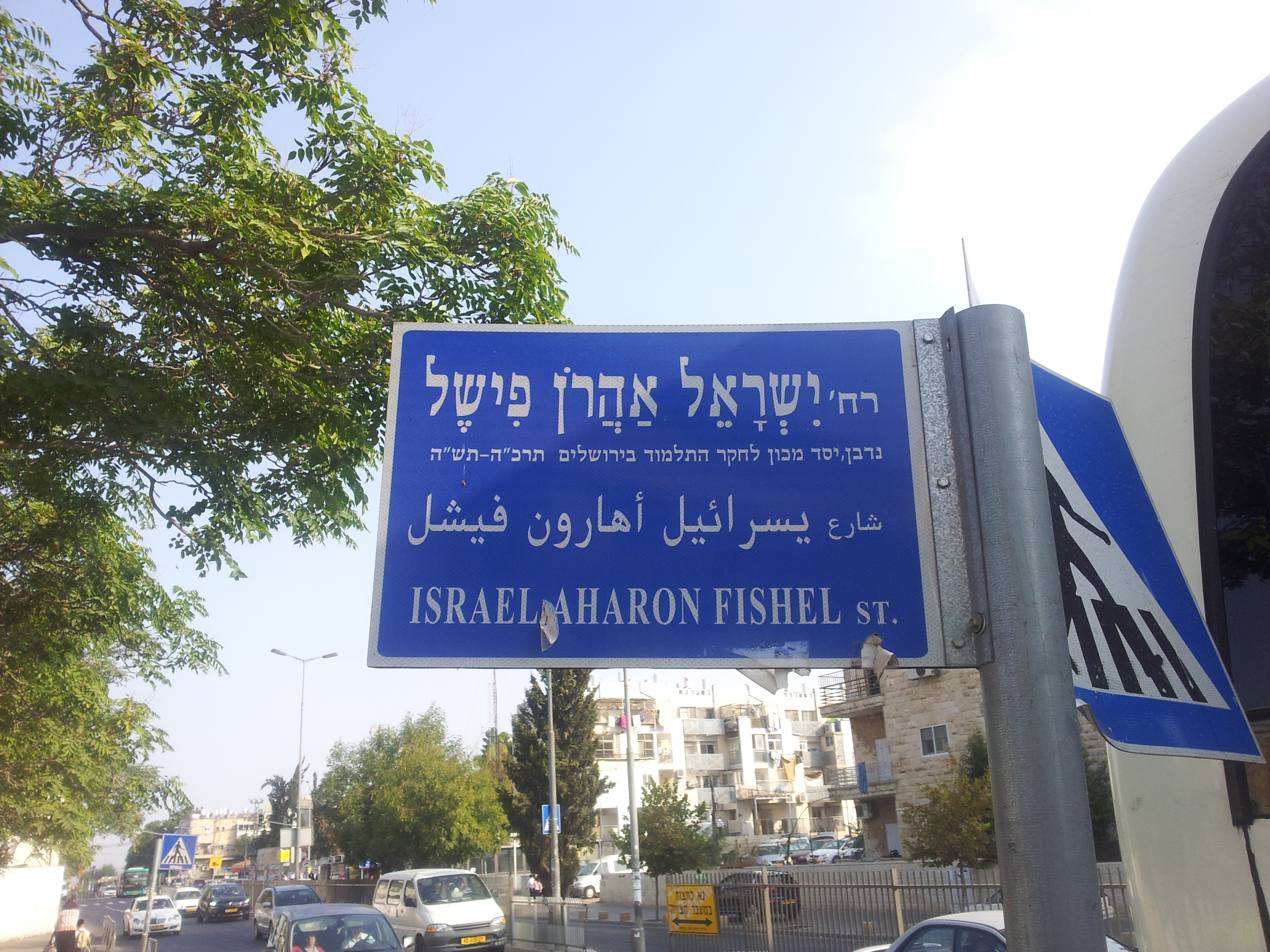
Fischel's street sign, Jerusalem

Yisroel Aaron Fischel (later known as Harry) was born on July 19, 1865, in the small, isolated town of the Russian Empire (now Lithuania) Merkinė to poor parents who were pious Jews. He became an architect and a builder at 19, emigrated to America virtually penniless at 20. Even when he earned only several dollars a week he sent money back to his parents who remained in Russia.

He and his wife made a vow that if they were successful they would donate a significant portion of their earnings to philanthropical causes.

The first building he built was on the Lower East Side of New York and introduced many new features that improved living conditions over the existing tenements. He obtained the support of Tammany Leader John F. Ahearn who helped enact the first sanitary codes related to tenements.

He earned his first million in real estate at a young age .

== Involvement in society ==
Fischel was active in matters concerning Jewish interests in the United States and Mandatory Palestine, including support for religious institutions and facilities such as Jewish schools and colleges, synagogues and kosher food kitchens, as well as various support for the Jewish worldwide community, with a focus on Jewish immigrants to the United States and Mandate Palestine.

Among his numerous distinctions were his service as the treasurer of the Hebrew Sheltering and Immigrant Aid Society (HIAS), beginning in 1890; a director of the Beth Israel Medical Center in 1891 (credited with laying the groundwork for its kosher policy that lasted 125 years); vice-president of the Hebrew Free Loan Societies; Vice President of the Beth Israel Medical Center in 1900; vice president of the Beth Hamedrash Hagadol on the Lower East Side, until he moved to Park Avenue in 1902; builder of the first modern Jewish theater in 1904 (exclusively for productions in Yiddish); charter member of the American Jewish Committee in 1906; prevailed on his co-founders to designate him to chair its second annual luncheon, to assure it and its future events would be kosher; personally prevailed on President Taft to install a kosher kitchen at Ellis Island in 1911, so that Orthodox Jewish immigrants could have the opportunity to eat kosher food during a probation period, thus becoming strong enough to pass the test to avoid deportation; president of the Uptown Talmud Torah in Manhattan in 1911 (in one of the first structures in New York built exclusively for this purpose, and then widely considered "the most important Jewish educational institution in America"); first treasurer of the Central Committee for the Relief of Jews Suffering Through the War, in 1914; member of the executive committee of the Joint Distribution Committee in 1914; organizer of the Palestine Building Loan Association in 1921; builder of a home, office, yeshiva and synagogue for the Chief Rabbi of Palestine Abraham Isaac Kook at his own expense in 1923; he established the Harry Fischel Institute for Talmudic Research in 1931 (which, after the creation of the country of Israel, trained, for many years, a large percentage of the judges who presided over the religious courts in the country); established the Harry Fischel Foundation on January 4, 1932 (later renamed the Harry & Jane Fischel Foundation).

Fischel was also a long-time member of Congregation Kehilath Jeshurun on Manhattan's Upper East Side, in which he had various roles and served as a trustee.

Fischel was involved in efforts on behalf of Yeshiva College and its predecessor entities. In 1889, Fischel became a director of the Etz Chaim Yeshiva; in 1895, Fischel became the chair of its building committee; in 1915, he became the chair of the building committee of the newly merged Etz Chaim Yeshiva and Rabbi Isaac Elchanan Theological Seminary, and a vice-president of the latter; in 1920 he became the chair of the building committee of the institution that would become Yeshiva College; and in 1927 he was the chair of the building committee upon the occasion of the laying of the cornerstone of the main building of the main campus of Yeshiva College in Washington Heights (now known as the Wilf Campus) Fischel established the Harry Fischel Graduate School for Higher Jewish Studies at Yeshiva University in 1945. The main beit midrash (study hall) in the main building of the main campus is known to this day as the Harry Fischel Study Hall. He played a primary role in saving the college from the brink of bankruptcy and closure during the Great Depression. A plaque in the main building of the main campus marks Fischel's service as acting president of Yeshiva College.

== Family ==
Fischel married Jane Brass in November 1887. The couple had four daughters and no sons who survived into adulthood. One daughter married a physician (Dr. Henry Rafsky), one married a lawyer (State Senator Albert Wald), one married a banker (David Kass), and one, married a rabbi (Rabbi Herbert S. Goldstein). Fischel openly stated that since he had no sons to bear his name, he had more of a motivation than most people to perpetuate his name by other means, in his case, the institutions named after him, in Israel and in America.

His daughter Rebecca Goldstein was a founder and served as the first president of the Women's Branch of the Orthodox Union. His granddaughter Josephine Reichel, served as national president of the Agudah Women of America; his granddaughter Dr. Naomi G. Cohen, is a professor at the University of Haifa; his grandson Simeon H.F. Goldstein, served as the executive director of the Harry Fischel Foundation; his great-granddaughter, Deborah Stepelman, serves on the board of the Riverdale Jewish Center; his great-grandson Seth Goldstein became the president of the Etz Chayim Congregation in Queens; his great-grandson Rabbi Hillel Reichel is the director of the Machon Harry Fischel (the Fischel Institute) in the historic campus and building in the Bucharian Quarter, in Israel.

Among the prominent spouses married to some of his descendants are Haifa Chief Rabbi She'ar Yashuv Cohen, who briefly served as Chief Rabbi of Israel; who also heads the Fischel Institute and the Ariel Institutes, and who previously served as Deputy Mayor of Jerusalem; and Rabbi Dr. O. Asher Reichel, who served as Rabbi of the West Side Institutional Synagogue and wrote a major biography on the historian and diplomat, Rabbi Yitzchak Isaac Halevy, based in part on his thesis when he was awarded the first M.H.L. degree ever issued by the Harry Fischel Graduate School, before he met – and married – Rabbi Goldstein's daughter, Josephine.

== Sources ==
- Goldstein, Herbert S., Fischel, Harry, Reichel, Aaron I., HARRY FISCHEL—Pioneer of Jewish Philanthropy—Forty Years of Struggle for a Principle and the Yeares Beyond (Augmented Edition) (Jersey City, New Jersey: Ktav), 2012
- Goldstein, Herbert S., Forty Years of Struggle for a Principle (New York: Bloch Publishers), 1928
- Levine, Yitchak, Harry Fischel: Orthodox Jewish Philanthropist Par Excellence, Glimpses Into American Jewish History, jewishpress.com
- Reichel, Aaron I., The Maverick Rabbi (Norfolk: Donning Publishers) 1984, 1986
- Reichel, Aaron I., “Pioneers of American Orthodoxy: Mr. Harry Fischel and Rabbi Herbert S. Goldstein,” pp. 114–117, in My Yeshiva College: 75 Years of Memories, ed. Menachem Butler and Zev Nagel (New York: Yashar Books) 2006.
