= Chizuk =

Concept in Jewish thought for spiritual encouragement

Chizuk (Hebrew: חִזּוּק) is a Hebrew term that refers to spiritual strengthening. It is derived from the root word ח.ז.ק. (chazak), meaning "to strengthen" or "to become strong." In Jewish thought, chizuk plays a central role in fortifying one's resolve in matters of faith. It is often invoked during times of difficulty or when one is seeking to improve spiritually. In many cases, chizuk is not only personal but communal, as individuals offer words of encouragement to others.

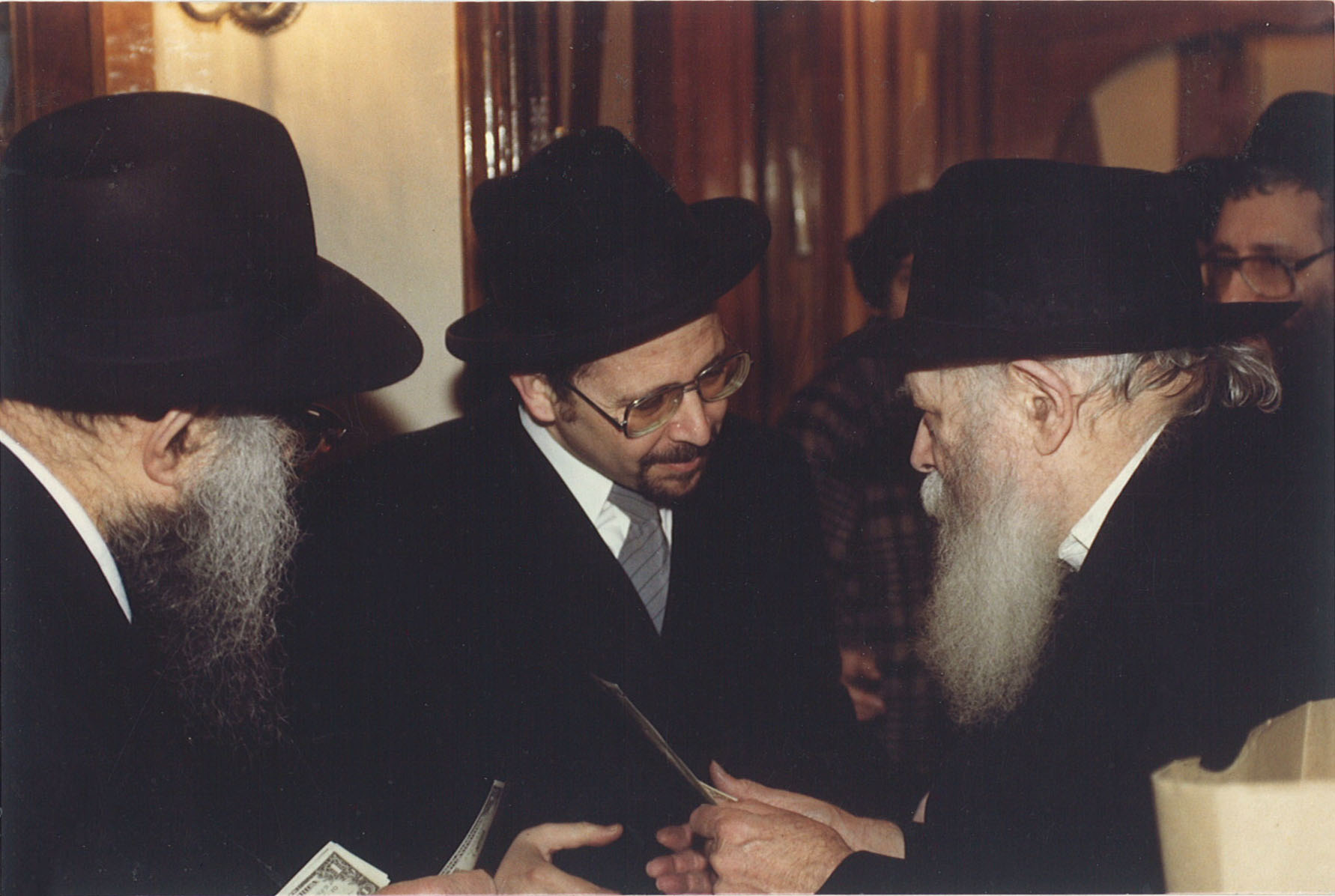
The Lubavitcher Rebbe giving chizuk

== Etymology ==
The Hebrew word chizuk originates from the root ח.ז.ק. (chet-zayin-kuf), which means "to strengthen" or "to become strong." It is closely related to the word chazak (strong) and is often used in contexts of giving or receiving encouragement. In the Torah, the term appears in various forms, such as in the command "Chazak ve'ematz" ("Be strong and courageous") given to Joshua by Moses in Deuteronomy 31:23.

== Biblical and Talmudic usage ==
Chizuk is a recurring theme throughout Jewish scripture and rabbinic literature, often reflecting the necessity of moral and spiritual fortitude. In the Gemara, specifically in Brachot 32b, the Sages note that four things require continuous chizuk: Torah study, good deeds (maasim tovim), prayer, and proper behavior (derech eretz). These practices are central to Jewish life and require sustained reinforcement, as challenges can erode one’s dedication to them.

The Maharal of Prague, in his work Be’er Hagolah, explains that the need for chizuk arises because "anything that generates antagonism must be upheld and sustained." The Maharal further elaborates that the body can weaken the soul’s ability to pursue spiritual goals, and thus, chizuk is essential for ensuring that the spiritual triumphs over the physical.

== In Judaism ==
Chizuk has been deeply integrated into Jewish tradition as a means of offering support to individuals during difficult times. For example, after the events of October 7th, 2023, which many have described as one of the darkest days for Klal Yisrael since the Holocaust, there has been an outpouring of chizuk aimed at bolstering the emotional resilience of the Jewish community.

An example of chizuk appears in the story of Joshua, who receives constant encouragement from Moshe and from Hashem as he prepares to lead the Jewish people into the Land of Israel. In Sefer Devarim 31:23, Hashem says to Joshua, "Chazak ve'ematz"—"Be strong and courageous." This is echoed repeatedly throughout the Book of Joshua as a reminder of the importance of faith in overcoming challenges. Additionally, in Pirkei Avot 5:23, it is stated, "According to the pain is the reward" (l’fum tzara agra). This reinforces the idea that spiritual growth often requires endurance, and chizuk is the spiritual energy that allows one to persevere through these trials.

In modern Jewish life, chizuk is often sought in the form of inspirational lectures and writings, designed to uplift spirits. For example, many yeshivot organize chizuk events where rabbis deliver talks aimed at strengthening the attendees' commitment to Torah observance.

In a spiritual sense, chizuk is also used to help individuals maintain faith in the face of adversity. This concept is embodied in the teaching of the Chazon Ish, who noted that while we cannot control the challenges we face, we can control our responses to them. Chizuk, in this context, becomes a tool for finding strength and purpose in suffering. A famous teaching of the Vilna Gaon also emphasizes the centrality of chizuk in overcoming personal shortcomings. He writes, "A person is alive to break whatever character defect he has not yet broken. Therefore, he must always strengthen himself. If he won’t strengthen himself, why does he live?"

== In prayer ==
In many communities, the phrase "Chazak, chazak, v'nitchazek" ("Be strong, be strong, and let us be strengthened") is recited after the reading of each of the five books of the Torah, reinforcing the idea that Torah observance requires constant chizuk.

== See also ==
- Emunah
- Bitachon
