= Yonah Karpilov =

European Yeshiva student and rabbi

Rabbi Yonah Karpilov (sitting) with his younger brother, Zeev Vilensky (1912–2000)

Yonah Karpilov (1909 – June 26, 1941), known among his peers as Rav Yonah Minsker, was an Orthodox yeshiva student in what is now Belarus. He was considered a genius and was said to be the "greatest of all yeshiva bachurim (yeshiva students) in pre-war Europe."

== Biography ==
Yonah Karpilov was one of the most accomplished students in the Yeshivas Brisk under Yitzchok Zev Soloveichik and in the Mir Yeshiva, in what is now Belarus. Despite being a student, it is said that Karpilov was worthy of being a rosh yeshiva. He was among the "lions of the Mir", the term given to that yeshiva's elite students, and his chavrusah was Yechiel Michel Feinstein, who would later become a rosh yeshiva in Israel. Among his other friends and acquaintances in Mir were the rabbis Simcha Sheps, Binyamin Zeilberger, Reuven Grozovsky, Leib Malin, and Chaim Shmuelevitz, many of whom felt humbled by him.

Karpilov authored the sefer Yonas Ilem, and composed the song Yetzaveh Tzur Chasdo. He first studied in the Mir Yeshiva before being chosen to study in Brisk; he later returned to the Mir Yeshiva. At the outbreak of World War II, the Mir Yeshiva personnel escaped their Soviet-occupied hometown of Mir to Kaunas, Lithuania. With the help of the Japanese consul to Kaunas, Chiune Sugihara, the yeshiva escaped Europe for Japan and Japanese-occupied Shanghai. Karpilov remained in Kaunas and was subsequently murdered on June 26 in the Kaunas pogrom of 1941 while standing outside the Slabodka Yeshiva. When his rebbi, Eliezer Yehuda Finkel, heard of Karpilov's murder, he wept, saying "Woe to the land, for a great man is gone. We have lost a piece of the Torah!"
