= Sara Stern-Katan =

Israeli politician (1919–2001)

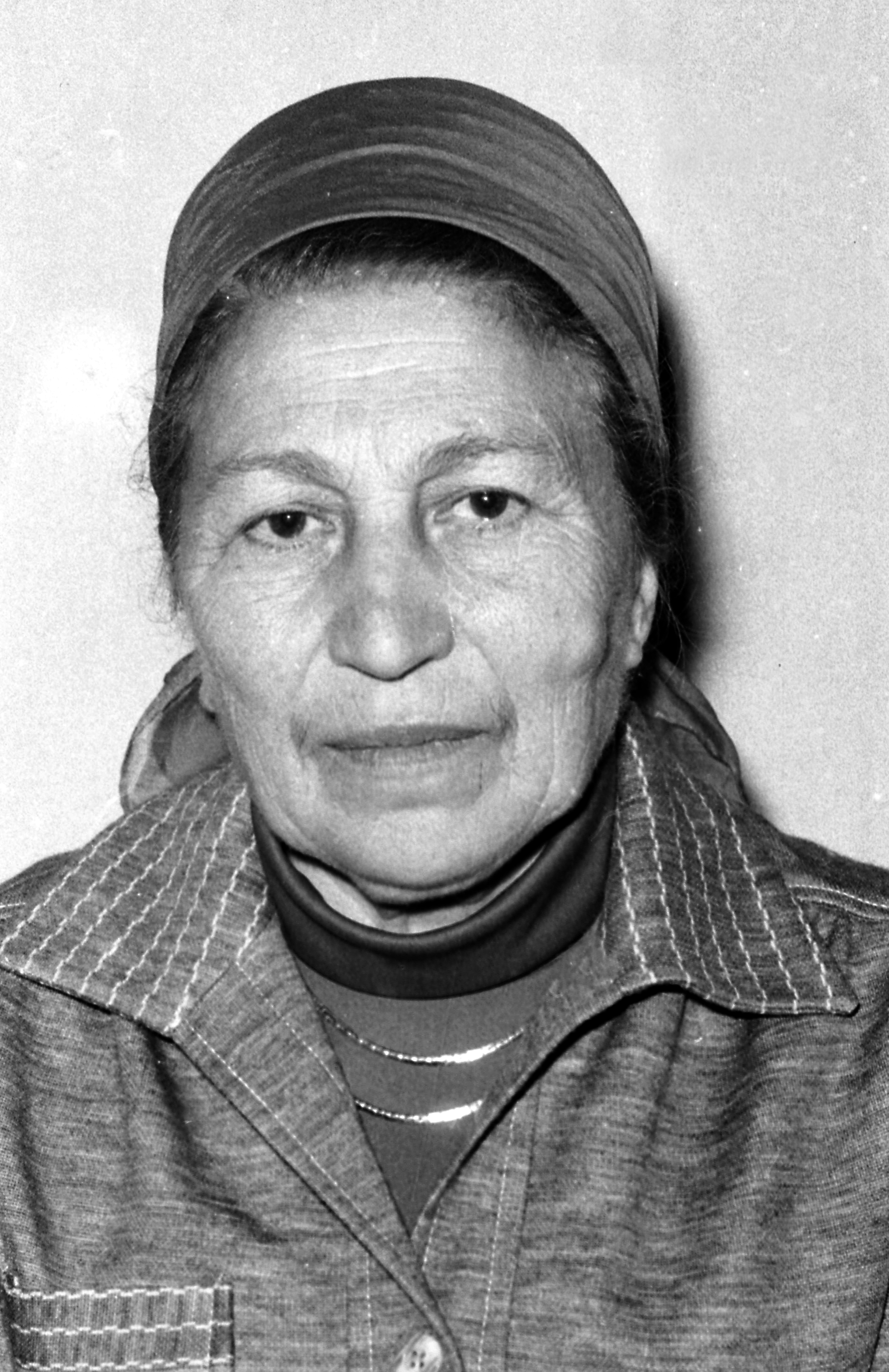
- Stern-Katan in 1977

Faction represented in the Knesset
- 1977–1981: National Religious Party

Personal details
- Born: 4 June 1919 Łódź, Poland
- Died: 23 September 2001 (aged 82)
- Awards: Israel prize (1998)

Sara Stern-Katan (Hebrew: שרה שטרן-קטן; 4 June 1919 – 23 September 2001) was an Israeli social worker and politician who served as a member of the Knesset for the National Religious Party between 1977 and 1981.

== Biography ==
Born in Łódź in 1919, Stern-Katan helped organise educational activities for the Torah VeAvoda movement in Poland and Germany, and was active in the Zionist underground during World War II. She studied social work at Simmons College in Boston, and emigrated to Mandatory Palestine in 1947.

A member of the board of the National Religious Women's Movement, she was the director of the Department of Professional Counseling for girls and women, and the development of girl's vocational boarding schools, a member of the Center of the Association for Social Services, and a member of the Ministry of Education-affiliated Education Council. She also lectured in social work at Bar-Ilan University. From 1984 to 1990 Stern-Katan served as chairwoman of Emunah, the Religious Zionist women’s organization, where she helped expand its educational and social programs.

In 1977, she was elected to the Knesset on the National Religious Party list, and was a member of the Education and Culture Committee, the Constitution, Law and Justice Committee, the Labor and Welfare Committee, and the State Control Committee. She lost her seat in the 1981 elections.

She died in 2001 at the age of 82.

== Awards ==
In 1988, Stern-Katan was awarded the Israel Prize for her special contribution to the society and the State of Israel.

== See also ==
- List of Israel Prize recipients
