= Herbert S. Goldstein =

Rabbi and communal activist in Manhattan, New York

Rabbi Herbert S. Goldstein
- הרב חיים שמשון
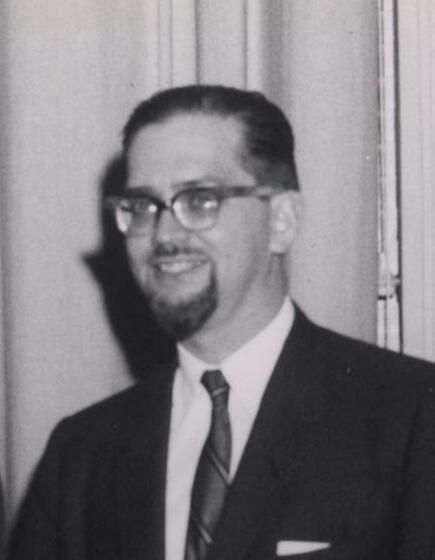
- Rabbi Herbert S. Goldstein

Personal life
- Born: February 8, 1890 New York, NY
- Died: January 2, 1970 (aged 79) New York, NY
- Buried: Mt. Eden Cemetery
- Spouse: Rebecca Fischel Goldstein
- Children: Simeon, Gabriel, Josephine Reichel, and Naomi G. Cohen
- Parents: Morris Goldstein (father); Sarah M. Mikler (mother)
- Education: BA, MA Columbia University, Rabbinic ordination Jewish Theological Seminary

Religious life
- Religion: Judaism
- Denomination: Orthodox
- Profession: Rabbi

Jewish leader
- Position: Rabbi
- Synagogue: West Side Institutional Synagogue
- Yahrtzeit: 25 Tevet
- Semikhah: Rabbi Shalom Elchanan Jaffe

Herbert S. Goldstein (February 8, 1890 – January 2, 1970) was a prominent American rabbi and Jewish leader. He was the first American-born, native English-speaking Orthodox rabbi. He founded and served as rabbi of the Institutional Synagogue, introducing a new concept in Orthodox synagogues. He was also president of the Union of Orthodox Jewish Congregations of America, founder and first president of the Rabbinical Council of America, and founder of Synagogue Council of America. He was also active in other community affairs, fighting vice and juvenile delinquency, acting as Chaplain for servicemen during WWI and WWII and helping European Jewry negatively affected by the two world wars.

He received an honorary doctor of divinity degree from Yeshiva University in 1941.

== Early life ==
Goldstein was born on the Lower East Side of New York to Morris and Sara Goldstein. His family were members of Beth Hamedrash Hagadol, where he had his Bar Mitzvah, and met his future father-in-law, Harry Fischel, who was also a member of the congregation.

He attended Etz Chaim Yeshiva, Townsend Harris High School, and Columbia University for his BA and Masters in Judaism, granted in 1912. His master's thesis was a biography of Kabbalist Moses Hayyim Luzatto and a translation of parts of his Praise for Righteousness. As a mutual wedding gift he and Rebecca translated the rest of Luzatto's poem.

He studied for rabbinic ordination at the Jewish Theological Seminary, affiliated with the Conservative movement, graduating as valedictorian in 1914. He also received private Orthodox rabbinic ordination from Rabbi Shalom Elchanan Jaffe of Beth Hamedrash Hagadol.

In 1915 he married Rebecca Fischel Goldstein, the daughter of Harry Fischel. The couple had four children.

== Rabbinic positions ==
=== Kehillat Jeshurun ===
From 1913, even before his ordination, he was engaged to deliver sermons at Congregation Kehilath Jeshurun. It had a tradition of employing a young Associate Rabbi to lecture in English to its largely English-speaking congregation, since the senior rabbi, Moses S. Margolies,(known as the Ramaz) did not speak English. Goldstein remained in this role until 1917 when he founded the Institutional Synagogue.

=== Institutional Synagogue- the creation of the “Jewish Community Center” ===
With the huge influx of Jews from Eastern Europe beginning in 1880 who were required to work on Saturdays, many abandoned traditional synagogues and sought out activities on Sunday, primarily via landsmanshaften (clubs of people from same area in Europe) or at the YM-YWHAs. American rabbis faced the dilemma of attracting them back to Judaism. The problem was even more acute with their American-born, often college-educated second generation children. Goldstein developed a unique idea of turning the synagogue into a “three-in-one” center, offering religious services, Jewish education and gymnasium/social clubs/lectures as the best way to attract young men and women and keep their Jewish identity. He published his “manifesto” on the front page of the Hebrew Standard on Sept 15, 1916, (and later published as a booklet of its own) and wrote of a synagogue that would offer modern Orthodox services designed for American congregations (differing from the old world shtetl services), educational facility for children in the afternoon and adults after work and on Sundays, with social and leisure activities in a Jewish atmosphere. Families could come at the same time and each participate in age-appropriate activities. Furthermore the Jewish Community Center would be significantly cheaper than paying for the three activities separately.

Goldstein founded Institutional Synagogue in 1917. He chose to open it in Harlem because there were 124,000 Jews living there. It was located in an old theatre at 37 West 116th Street in Harlem which had a pool in the basement and thus was nicknamed the “shul (synagogue) with a pool".

The synagogue services came first, and then the Hebrew school and then came the gymnasium and the Olympic-size swimming pool.

Goldstein and Rebecca instituted Sunday “revivals” with music, sermons, and refreshments to attract members. Several thousands attended these meetings.

In addition Goldstein and his wife created many “firsts” at the in the world of Orthodox synagogues: a Sisterhood (called Women's League), a Men’s Club, Daughters of Institutional Center (for young women) , the Young Folks League, a Social Service League, Bible, Talmud and other Jewish studies classes for adults. The Institutional Synagogue, in its prime, served approximately 3,000 people a day, and had a roster of 67 clubs.

The synagogue was located at 37 West 116th Street in Harlem and relocated to 76th Street on the Upper West Side in 1937.

Goldstein was offered the pulpit of America's oldest synagogue, Congregation Shearith Israel, most commonly known as the Spanish and Portuguese Synagogue, to succeed the Reverend Doctor Henry Pereira Mendes in 1921, but ultimately did not take the position. He stayed at the Institutional Synagogue, and its eventual successor, the West Side Institutional Synagogue until retiring. The latter was one of the most influential Orthodox synagogues in the country under his leadership.

== Other leadership roles in US ==
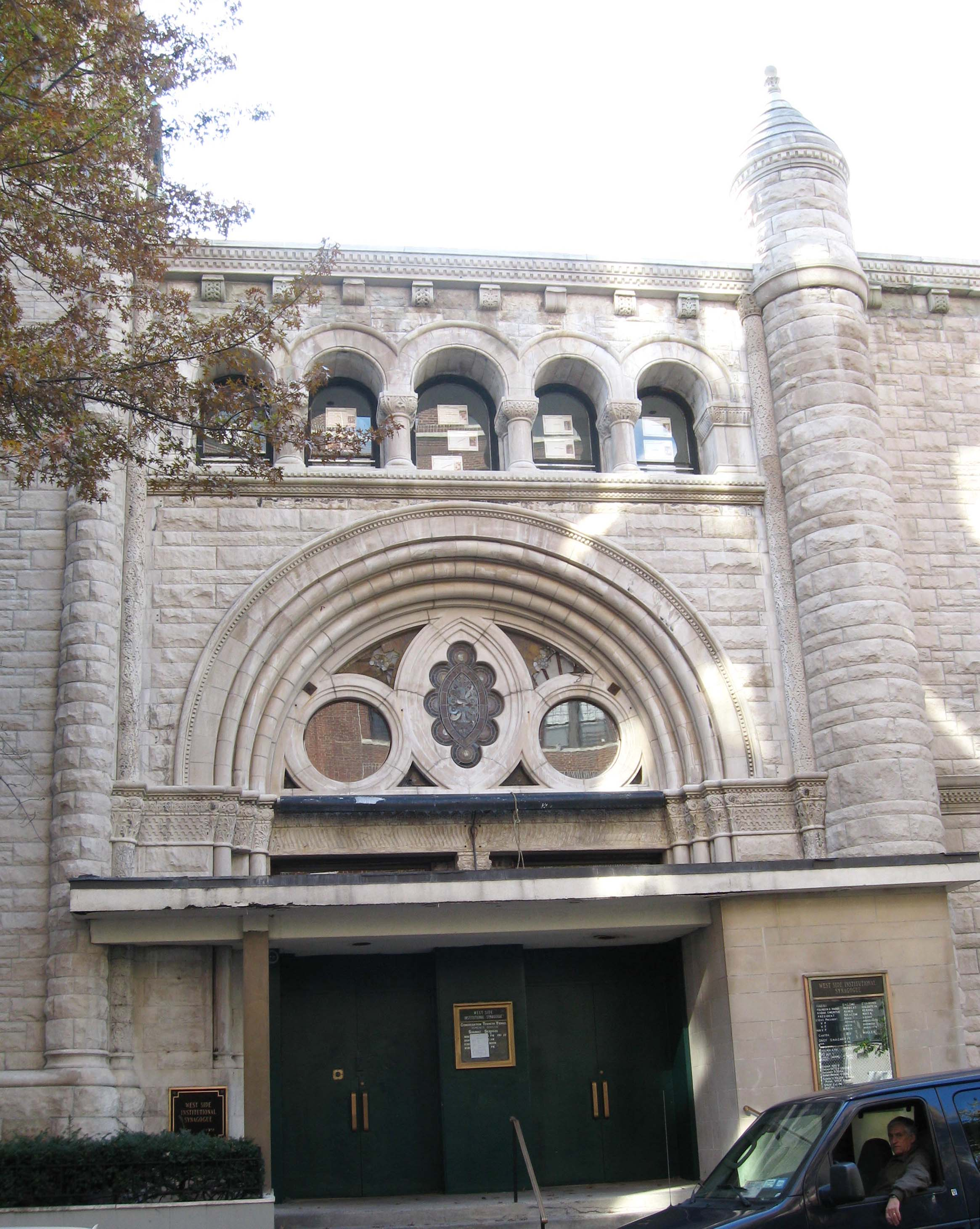
West Side Institutional Synagogue

=== Union of Orthodox Jewish Congregations of America ===
Goldstein was president of the Union of Orthodox Jewish Congregations of America (UOJCA) for close to a decade from 1924 to 1933. In 1924 at the suggestion of the Women's Branch of the OU, he helped establish the Kosher Certificate Service (KCS) which provided supervision and Kosher endorsement of products by various manufacturers. In 1927, after Sunshine Crackers and Heinz vegetarian beans and several other products received certification they created the OU the symbol to place on products, which is still in use today.

He helped create national organization for college youth (the precursor of Yavneh) and for high school youth (the precursor of the National Conference of Synagogue Youth).

He also played a role in getting Yeshiva College recognized by the New York Board of Regents, in 1928 by guaranteeing its financial viability on behalf of the UOJC.

=== Rabbinical Council of America ===
Goldstein was one of the founders of the Rabbinical Council of America in 1935 and served as president from 1938-1940. Orthodox rabbis in North America are members and it provides support, addressing various issues facing Jewish communities and interfaith dialogue.

=== Synagogue Council of America ===
Goldstein was also one of the founders of the Synagogue Council of America (SCA), an umbrella organization of leading rabbis from each of the 3 denominations of Judaism(Orthodox, Conservative, and Reform). The objective of the organization was to develop joint policies and events with regard to issues affecting American Jews. Goldstein was president from 1944-1946.

=== National Conference of Christians and Jews ===
He was a co-founder of the National Conference of Christians and Jews, and was one of the leading English-speaking fund-raisers in the Orthodox Jewish community when it was still dominated by Yiddish-speaking foreign born individuals.

=== Fights for Jewish rights ===
He led many fights for Jewish rights, beginning with the fight to expose unscrupulous fraudulent "kosher" butchers, and their powerful backers; fought for a five day work week to enable Orthodox Jews to observe the Shabbat, fought for the rights of the downtrodden, in many social settings and political arenas, including the successful fight for a historic Minimal Wage Law.

== Leadership roles in Israel ==
=== Homes for Children in Israel ===
He was president of the Keren Hayishuv the American Religious Palestine Fund, and of the Save-A-Child Foundation, which evolved into the Homes for Children in Israel.

=== World Academy for Higher Jewish Studies ===
Together with then Chief Rabbi of Israel Isaac Herzog he created the Academy from four other institutions in Israel involved in Jewish studies in Israel: Mishpat Hatorah prepared religious judges , Encyclopedia Talmudit involved in developing an Encyclopedia of Jewish law, Shaas Israeli working on a critical edition of the Talmud, and Chakikah, researching Jewish laws which could form the basis for laws in a future country of Israel. Herzog served as president and Goldstein was chairman of the Board of Trustees.

== Academic positions ==
After he was ordained he joined the staff of the Rabbi Isaac Elchanan Theological Seminary, Yeshiva University's affiliated rabbinical school, teaching primarily homiletics, the art of writing and delivering sermons. Eventually he headed the homiletics department until the early 1960s.

In 1941 he was awarded a Doctor of Divinity degree by Yeshiva University.

== Writings ==
The primary books authored by Rabbi Goldstein were:

- Bible Comments for Home Reading (The Five Books of the Chumash, plus the Book of Joshua)
- Between the Lines of the Bible (on each commandment in the Bible)
- A commentary on the Pirkei Avot (The Ethics of the Fathers).

== Books that refer to him ==
- Goldman, Yosef, Hebrew Printing In America (YGBooks 2006).
- Goldstein, Herbert S. Forty Years of Struggle for a Principle: The Biography of Harry Fischel, Bloch Publishing Company, 1928.
- Gurock, Jeffrey S. "The Orthodox Synagogue", in Wertheimer, Jack. The American Synagogue: A Sanctuary Transformed, Cambridge University Press, 2003. ISBN 0-521-53454-2
- Reichel, Aaron I. (1984) The Maverick Rabbi—Rabbi Herbert S. Goldstein and the Institutional Synagogue -- "A New Organizational Form", The Donning Company Publishers. ISBN 0-89865-174-3
