= Israel Women's Network =

Israeli feminist organization

- שדולת הנשים בישראל اللوبي النسائي في إسرائيل
- Formation: 1984
- Purpose: To achieve long-term systematic change regarding women’s rights in Israel.
- Headquarters: Ramat Gan, Israel
- Chairwoman: Yafa Vigodsky
- Key people: Dr. Michal Sela, Executive Director
- Staff: 12 (2024)
- Website: iwn.org.il

Israel Women's Network (IWN; Hebrew: שדולת הנשים בישראל, Arabic: اللوبي النسائي في إسرائيل) is a feminist non-partisan civil society organization founded in Jerusalem in 1984. IWN's mission is to advance the status of women in Israel by promoting equality through a range of projects and methods.

== Background ==
IWN was founded in 1984 as a result of a conference held in Jerusalem by the Jewish-American Congress. The four-day conference, headed by Betty Friedan, was titled "Woman as Jew, Jew as Woman: An Urgent Inquiry". The participants compiled a list of demands for legislative changes which would improve the social and political standing of women in Israel and the American Jewish diaspora. These demands were successfully presented to the heads of the Labor Party and the Likud Party, thus initiating the formation of a non-partisan organization that would focus on advancing the status of women through education, legislation and advocacy.

Alice Shalvi, one of the founders of the IWN, was chairperson of the organization. Other founders included Nitza Shapiro-Libai, Tamar Eshel, Janet Sherman, Naomi G. Cohen. They held public meetings across Israel to raise awareness about women's issues and to determine the primary obstacles concerning Israel's female population. These meetings attracted large audiences, and shed light on issues of which very few women at the time were aware. These topics included: women's health, equality in the workplace and equal opportunity, the portrayal of women in the media, lack of representation in the government, and women's status in the rabbinical courts and in family law in general.

== Origin ==
IWN gained recognition as Israel's major advocacy group for women's rights. Meetings with Knesset members to establish collaboration on women's issues became a common occurrence, which led to the unprecedented authoring of new legislation regarding women passed by Knesset, such as the Prevention of Sexual Harassment Law and the Prevention of Family Violence Law. Additionally, IWN promoted and succeeded in establishing the parliamentary Committee for the Advancement of Women as an official Knesset committee.

IWN's offices are located in Ramat Gan.

== Goals ==
Israel Women's Network targets change on a national policy level as well as on a grassroots level. IWN seeks to achieve long-term systematic change regarding women's rights in Israel. Aside from its legislative and advocacy work, the organization is engages in legal representation of women regarding pay equity, women's protective labor law enforcement and sexual harassment; increasing public participation and women's leadership; economic empowerment of marginalized women; and supporting at-risk girls and young women.

== Accomplishments ==
In 1987 IWN hosted a one-week International Conference of Women Writers, attended by approximately 60 authors from around the world. Participants debated the existence of a distinct genre identified as "women’s writing", and the perceived distinction between male and female literary styles. Also in 1987, IWN assisted Leah Shakdiel in becoming the first woman to serve on a religious council, through a petition to the Supreme Court.

In 1988, IWN, Hadassah, and AJC collaborated on an international conference on the empowerment of Jewish women. During the conference a number of participants decided to conduct a women's prayer service, including a Torah reading at the Western Wall in Jerusalem. The act was regarded as controversial and caused Orthodox men in the vicinity to display resentment and animosity. This led to the foundation of a new group, the Women of the Wall, who demanded the right of women to wear tallit and read Torah while praying at the Wall. A law formulated by IWN was passed in 1991 to address domestic violence. The law allowed the courts to provide immediate assistance to families who were faced with the threat of domestic violence by issuing a restraining order that could be extended for up to six months.

In 1994 IWN petitioned the High Court on behalf of Lieutenant Alice Miller, a female officer and student of aeronautics whom the Israel Defense Forces (IDF) had banned from taking the preliminary pilot examinations. In 1995 it was ruled that the IDF had to open its gates to women who were interested in the pilots training course. Three years later, the first female graduated flight school as a combat navigator, and 2001 marked the first graduation of a female combat pilot.

IWN was the first group to bring to government attention the phenomenon of sex trafficking in Israel. In 1997 IWN prepared a report entitled "Trafficking of Women and Forced Prostitution in Israel", which revealed that hundreds of women were being brought to Israel illegally every year from the former Soviet Union and forced into prostitution. As a result of IWN's demands, a coalition of organizations was formed to combat the trafficking of women, the Knesset passed a law banning human trafficking, and in 2000 a parliamentary committee was established in the Knesset to handle matters regarding the trafficking of women.

IWN's legal department, in 1998, initiated one of the most advanced laws in the world to outlaw sexual harassment. The law prohibits sexual harassment in all spheres, including the workplace, the military, and educational institutions. The law also broadens the definition of sexual harassment, and requires employers to take appropriate measures to prevent such harassment in the workplace by publicizing a set of rules that correspond with the law, as well as to adhere to pre-established procedures for reporting related grievances. The law demands severe punishment of those who transgress, on both the civil and criminal levels.

In 2003 IWN, with the help of volunteer lawyers, represented thirteen women who had been fired from their jobs during pregnancy. IWN's legal department formulated an amendment to the Equal Opportunities in the Workplace Act, which prohibits discrimination against pregnant women. The amendment was passed in the Knesset. Despite this amendment, IWN continues to be presented with cases of women being fired or otherwise discriminated against during pregnancy and immediately following childbirth, including a case in 2006 in which a woman, Ababitan, was fired from her job when she was seven months pregnant. IWN won an unprecedented compensation in this lawsuit on behalf of Ababitan, and continues to represent women in similar situations.

Since 2006, IWN has held consultative status with the United Nations Economic and Social Council (ECOSOC), which allows the organization to monitor the Israeli government in order to ensure that they act with accountability on women's rights in accordance with various international conventions. Additional achievements include: Prolonging mandatory paid maternity leave to 14 weeks and improving the enforcement of protective labor laws for women, preventing the raising of the retirement age for women, and monitoring the level of equal representation of women on corporate boards and public authorities.
