= Yaakov Moshe Hillel =

Kabbalistic Yeshiva Ahavat Shalom in Jerusalem

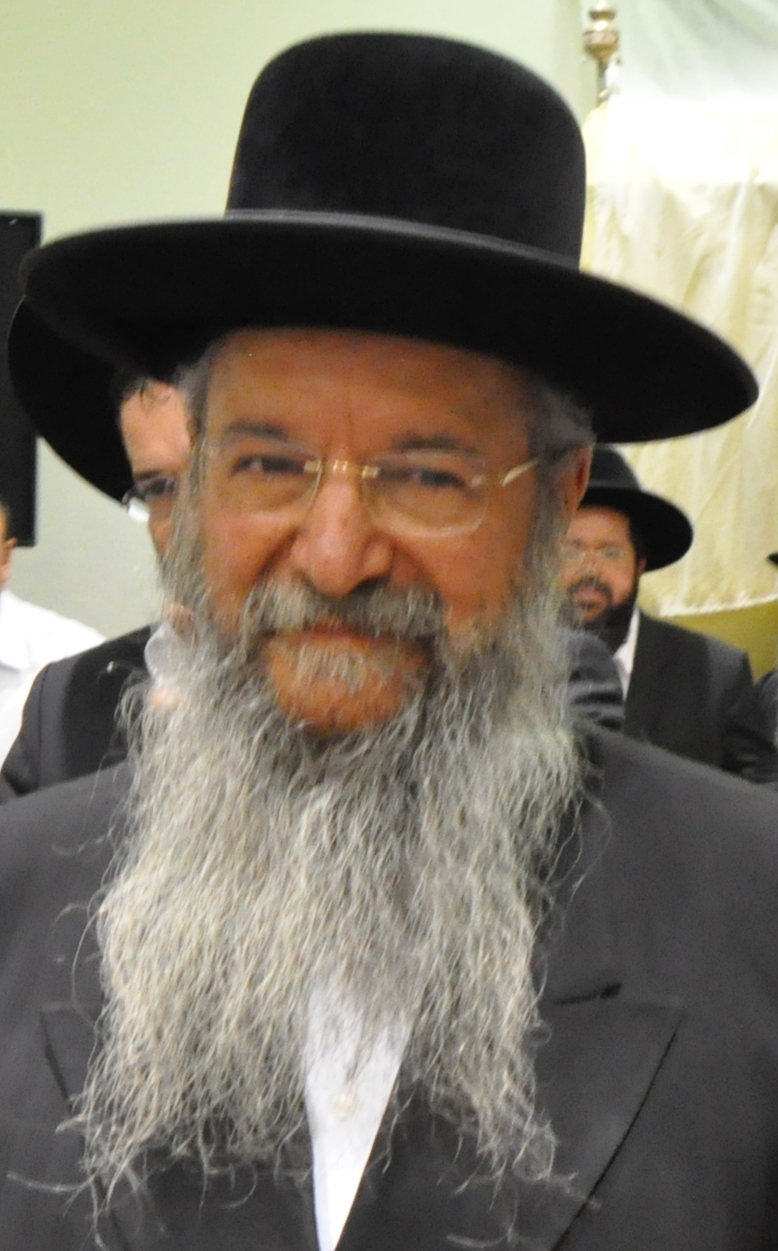
Rabbi Yaakov Moshe Hillel

Yaakov Moshe Hillel (Hebrew: יעקב משה הלל; born August 29, 1945) is the head of the Kabbalistic Yeshiva Ahavat Shalom in Jerusalem. He has been described as a prolific author and publisher of sefarim. The majority of his works are about Kabbalah.

His students include Rabbis Daniel Frisch and Shimshon Dovid Pincus.

== Biography ==
Yaakov Moshe Hillel was born in Mumbai, India to Moshe Hillel (grandson of Rabbi Avraham Hillel who served as a rabbi in Iraq). He lived in England, studied at the Gateshead Yeshiva, and later immigrated to Israel and studied at the Ponevezh Yeshiva in Bnei Brak, where he became a Talmid Muvhak of Rav Shach.

He married Ziona, daughter of Rabbi Yitzhak Ohana, who was the chief rabbi of Kiryat Shmona. After marrying, he studied at the Dayan and Rabbinical Training Institute established by Rishon Lezion, Rabbi Yitzhak Nissim, and at the Harry Fishel Institute. Among other things, he learned the basics of Kabbalah from Rabbi Mordechai Attia (the grandfather).He has 19 children. Prior to marrying, he was an artist, hence the title of Kol Hazman's biography: From Artist/Painter to Genius Kabbalist."

He established a yeshiva named Ahavat Shalom in the early 1970s, at which he began his daily classes in Kabbalah. Ahavat Shalom is the third biggest Yeshivah in the world, after Lakewood's and Mir. He used his English-speaking background to facilitate his Kiruv work. He founded a girl's seminary, Bnos Elisheva, in 2002.

== Published works ==
Many of the titles that use the word Yam (Hebrew: ים or י"ם) refer to Hillel's initials, Yud Mem (for Yaakov Moshe). Similarly, HaYam adds the letter Hay (ה), for Hillel.

His books are:

- VaYaShav HaYam - She'elot U'Teshuvot (3 volume set; volume 3: 5772) - Volume 1 is about practical yet technical aspects of writing Torah scrolls and Tefillin.
  - VaYaShav HaYam (Volume 3) - She'elot U'Teshuvot - Practical aspects, foundational issues, Shulchan Aruch (Code of Jewish Law)
- HaVayn BeChochma (understand with wisdom) - (3 volumes) Articles and Notes on Kabbalah Theory and Intention of the Rash
- Aid HaGaL HaZeh - about Lag BaOmer and Rashbi (Rabbi Shimon bar YoChai)
- Aspaklariya DeNahara - Annotation on the Preface of the River Streets of the Rash. Contains two commentaries: one called "Nahara uPashta" and the other named "MayAmKay HaYam."
- GeVurot Ha-Ari - Answers and Articles on resolving halachic and Kabalistic disputes
- GaLay HaYam - about the morning prayers in the synagogue (and praying with devotion)
- Sefat HaYam (Hebrew: שפת הים) - a seven volume set:
  - Sefat HaYam: Rosh HaShanah, Sukkot & Shavuot
  - Sefat HaYam: Sefirat HaOmer
  - Sefat HaYam: Seuda & Birkat HaNeHeNin

Topics of the other four volumes include ShoVaVim, Chanukah and Purim.

- Ruach HaYam - assorted conversations and articles (22 chapters): Kiruv, Peter Chamor, laws dealing with a new Sefer Torah, the mitzvah of Torah study, preventing desecration of graves, proper inspection of Torah scrolls & Tefillin.
  - Ruach HaYam - Hespedim (eulogies): a same-year publication of Divrei Hesped for Rav Shach, Rav Elyashiv, and 11 others. Also has 4 more chapters done in honor/in memory of.
- Pe'At HaYam al Shaar HaKaVaNot - writings about Passover, the counting of the Omer, and Shavuot.
- PeTach Shaar HaShamayim & Binyan Ariel - about studying Kabbalah (who should, how, when)
- Shorshei HaYam at Etz Chaim (5 volumes) - teachings based on Chaim Vital's Etz Chaim.

=== English ===
- Faith and Folly: The Occult in Torah Perspective was originally published in Hebrew as Tamim Tiheyeh (Hebrew: תמים תהיה).
- Ascending Jacob's Ladder - a collection of essays on basic Jewish topics (Shabbat/Holidays, Prayers, Torah study), based on "Midrash, Mussar, and Kabbalah."
- Roni Akarah: A Guide for the Childless
- (EDITOR) The Ben Ish Hai: The Life and Legacy of Rabbi Yosef Hayym
- Ascending The Path (5 Vol.) on Mesillat Yesharim. It clarifies and defines the relevance of the Mesillat Yesharim to our daily lives and includes many new concepts and explanations to aid the reader's progress along the path of the just.

=== Manuscripts/editing ===
- Bein Zro'ot Olam (Hebrew: בין זרועות עולם) - regarding positioning of a bed
- Oter Yisroel BeSifAra (Hebrew: עוטר ישראל בתפארה) - regarding Rashi and Rabbeinu Tam's Tefillin; whether they may both be worn simultaneously.
- VaYaTzetz Tzitz (Hebrew: ויצץ ציץ) - Kabbalistic view on having the fringes of the "minor" Talis (Arba Kanfot/Talis Katan) should be visible.
- Yismach Moshe (Hebrew: ישמח משה) - regarding laws of mourning.

Hillel has overseen publication of works published by his yeshiva, including Rabbi Eliyahu Eliezer Dessler's novellae on the Talmud, with an introduction written by Hillel.

== Controversy ==
In an article about Hillel's 3 volume set "Kitvuni LeDorot" Yosef Avivi alleged that large parts of the book were plagiarized from Avivi's book Binyan Ariel, not to be confused with Hillel's book of the same name.
