= David Cohen (rabbi) =

Lithuanian rabbi (1887–1972)

Rabbi David Cohen דוד כהן

Personal life
- Born: 1887 Maišiagala, Russian Empire
- Died: 8 August 1972 (aged 84–85)
- Buried: Mount of Olives Jewish Cemetery
- Children: She'ar Yashuv, Tzipiah

Religious life
- Religion: Judaism
- Denomination: Orthodox Judaism

David Cohen (Hebrew: דוד כהן; 1887–8 August 1972) (also known as "Rav Ha-Nazir," the Nazirite Rabbi) was a rabbi, talmudist, philosopher, kabbalist, and a disciple of Rabbi Abraham Isaac Kook. A noted Jewish ascetic, he took a Nazirite vow at the outbreak of World War I.

== Education ==
Cohen was born in Maišiagala, near Vilna (in modern Lithuania), the scion of a distinguished rabbinic family. In his youth he studied at the Raduń Yeshiva under Rabbi Yisrael Meir Kagan, at the Volozhin yeshiva, and at the yeshiva in Slabodka. Even at that time, his restless and inquiring mind led him to extend his studies beyond the traditional subjects taught in the yeshivot. Thus he turned to Rabbi Samson Raphael Hirsch and the early writings of Rabbi Abraham Isaac Kook. He also studied Russian to prepare himself for entrance to the university.

During the Russian Revolution of 1905 he was twice arrested but was not detained. His spiritual unrest and the desire to widen his intellectual horizon led him to enroll in the Academy for Jewish Studies established by Baron David Guenzburg, where one of his close fellow students was Zalman Shazar, later president of Israel. From there he proceeded to Germany to study at the University of Freiburg. At the outbreak of World War I he was interned as an enemy alien, but was released and made his way to Basel, Switzerland, where he became involved in the Jewish Community while continuing studying Torah and also studying philosophy, classical literature, and Roman law at the University of Basel.

He was for a time chairman of the Jewish Students' Society there and delivered lectures on Jewish philosophy. It was then that he took upon himself a lifelong Nazirite vow, which involves complete abstention from cutting one's hair and partaking of any products of the vine. However, his personal asceticism went further: he became vegetarian, eschewing not only meat but also any garment made of leather, and practised self-imposed silence vows (referred to in Hebrew as "Speech Fasts") on a regular basis. A weekly silence every Shabbat; a monthly silence every Rosh Hodesh Eve (Yom Kippur Katan), and the highlight - an annual silence period of 41 days from Erev Rosh Hodesh Elul to the end of Yom Kippur. In addition, despite being proficient in nine languages, he refused to speak anything but Hebrew. Additionally, from the capture of the Old City of Jerusalem by the Jordanians in 1947–1949 Palestine war until the capture by the IDF in the Six-Day War (1967), he vowed not to leave his home. Finally, since Israel's independence (1948), he vowed not to leave Jerusalem and, in fact, left Jerusalem only on 3 occasions after that (24 years until his passing), with each such departure being formally approved by a special Beith Din (a Rabbinical Court) granting him temporary permission to depart from his undertaking. However, he was not a recluse and was extremely warm, welcoming and respectful towards any person who came to see him, regardless of this person's status, age, or in many cases, eccentricities. Rabbi Cohen was fully aware of the day-to-day occurrences in Israel and did not hesitate to publicly express his views on important topical issues.

== Meeting Rabbi Abraham Isaac Kook ==
The turning point in his life came with his meeting, on 29 Av, with Rabbi Kook, who was then in St. Gallen in Switzerland (1915). "My life then stood in the balance," he noted. "I listened to him and was turned into a new man. ... I had found a master." He decided to abandon his secular studies and devote himself entirely to Jewish thought.

In 1922 he received an invitation from Rabbi Kook, who had returned to the Land of Israel, to become a tutor in the yeshiva which he had established. He helped draw up the curriculum, which was also to include history, philosophy, ethics, Hebrew grammar, and Bible. He was appointed lecturer in Talmud, ethics, and philosophy.

The two used to meet daily, and Rabbi Kook entrusted him with the editing of his philosophical works, to which, along with disseminating Kook's ideas, he dedicated his life, hardly publishing any of his own works, although he left over 30 works in manuscript. The principal exception was the Kol Nevu'ah, of which the first volume appeared shortly before his death. It is in two parts, "The Foundations of Jewish Religious Philosophy" and "The Foundations of Inner Wisdom."

== Personal life ==
Cohen was married to his cousin, Sarah Cohen (Etkin) and had a daughter and a son: Zfia Goren (who married Rabbi Shlomo Goren, a chief rabbi of Israel), and Rabbi She'ar Yashuv Cohen, a chief rabbi of Haifa. Cohen, his wife and his children were vegetarian.

Cohen's Yahrzeit is on the 28th of Av.

In 1977, a three-volume Festschrift entitled Nezir Ehav was published in his memory.

== See also ==
- Jewish vegetarianism
