= Beth Hatalmud Rabbinical College =

Yeshiva in Bensonhurst, Brooklyn, spinoff of Mir/Europe

Coordinates: 40.6052°N 73.9927°W

Information
- School type: Yeshiva
- Established: 1950; 76 years ago
- Website: bethhatalmud.org

Beth Hatalmud Rabbinical College, or in short known as Bais Hatalmud, is a Rabbinical college located in the Bensonhurst section of Brooklyn, New York. It was accredited by until 2025, where it withdrew from AARTS accreditation.

== Founding and mission ==
=== Background ===
Bais Hatalmud was founded in 1950 by students of the Mir Yeshiva in Belarus, which survived the Holocaust by escaping to Japan and ultimately found refuge in Shanghai where the yeshiva spent the war years. One of the deans of the Mir Yeshiva in Poland, Rabbi Avraham Kalmanowitz, managed to escape to America in 1940 and established a yeshiva in Brooklyn in 1946 that he called the Mir yeshiva. However, when the Mir student body arrived in the U.S. from Shanghai, they did not join the yeshiva founded by Rabbi Kalmanowitz. Some of the most distinguished students of the yeshiva held that while the yeshiva established by Rabbi Kalmanowitz was called the Mir Yeshiva, that yeshiva was not the Mir yeshiva that existed in Poland, and that the actual Mir Yeshiva was the one that went to Shanghai and arrived in America after World War II. This was because the institution of the Mir Yeshiva was based on the student body and that a yeshiva was based on the culture and values that were established by the yeshiva and that the yeshiva demanded its students abide by. In fact the idea that the basis of a yeshiva are the values and way of life it demanded of its students was how the original Mir yeshiva in Poland defined itself as what it gave it its identity.

=== Within the walls ===
It was therefore decided by the students of the original Mir yeshiva to establish a new institution in America that would serve as the continuation of the original Mir yeshiva. The fact that the Mir yeshiva was the only yeshiva in Europe to survive the Nazi destruction of European Jewry in its entirety was a primary reason they held that there should be a continuation of the original yeshiva in Europe in America after World War II. They called this Yeshiva Bais Hatalmud, which means The House of the Talmud.

The mission of this yeshiva was to have it be to continue the ideals and values of the Mir yeshiva was in Poland, and to preserve and uphold the way that things were in the original yeshiva. A very important aspect of the original yeshiva was a concept that was called living within the proverbial "walls" of the yeshiva. The concept of the "walls" of a yeshiva is that a yeshiva is its own world and culture separate from the world outside it. What is held to be important and what is respected and strived for within the yeshiva, is completely different than that of the outside world. Thus the proverbial "walls" of the yeshiva separate the world of the yeshiva, and those within it, from the world outside.

== Academics ==
Bais Hatalmud has an undergraduate division and a post graduate division. In the post graduate division students eventually move on from the subjects that are being studied in the yeshiva, which are limited to civil jurisprudence, and form groups where they study other parts of the Talmud. The school's accreditation is from the Association of Advanced Rabbinical and Talmudic Schools.

== History ==
A month after Rabbi Aryeh Leib Malin's marriage in 1948, a meeting was held in his home to establish Yeshivas Beis Hatalmud.

Rabbi Aryeh Leib Malin, along with Rabbi Chaim Wysokier served as the Roshei Hayeshiva. After the passing of Rabbi Malin, Harav Chaim Wysokier remained alone at the helm of the Yeshiva. Later, after Rabbi Wysokier died, the Yeshiva was led by its three remaining elders, including Harav Shalom Menashe Gotlieb, Harav Yisroel Perkowski and Harav Binyomin Zeilberger. After the passing of the Rosh yeshivah Rav Chaim Wyoskeir, there was a din torah to decide who will lead the Yeshiva. Many years of confusion and controversy followed. Today the hanhala is led by Rabbi Naftali Kaplan along with Rabbi Yehuda Zeilberger and Rabbi Chaim Leib Perkowski.

== See also ==
- Mir yeshiva (Belarus)
