= Aryeh Leib Malin =

Polish-born American rabbi, (1906–1962)

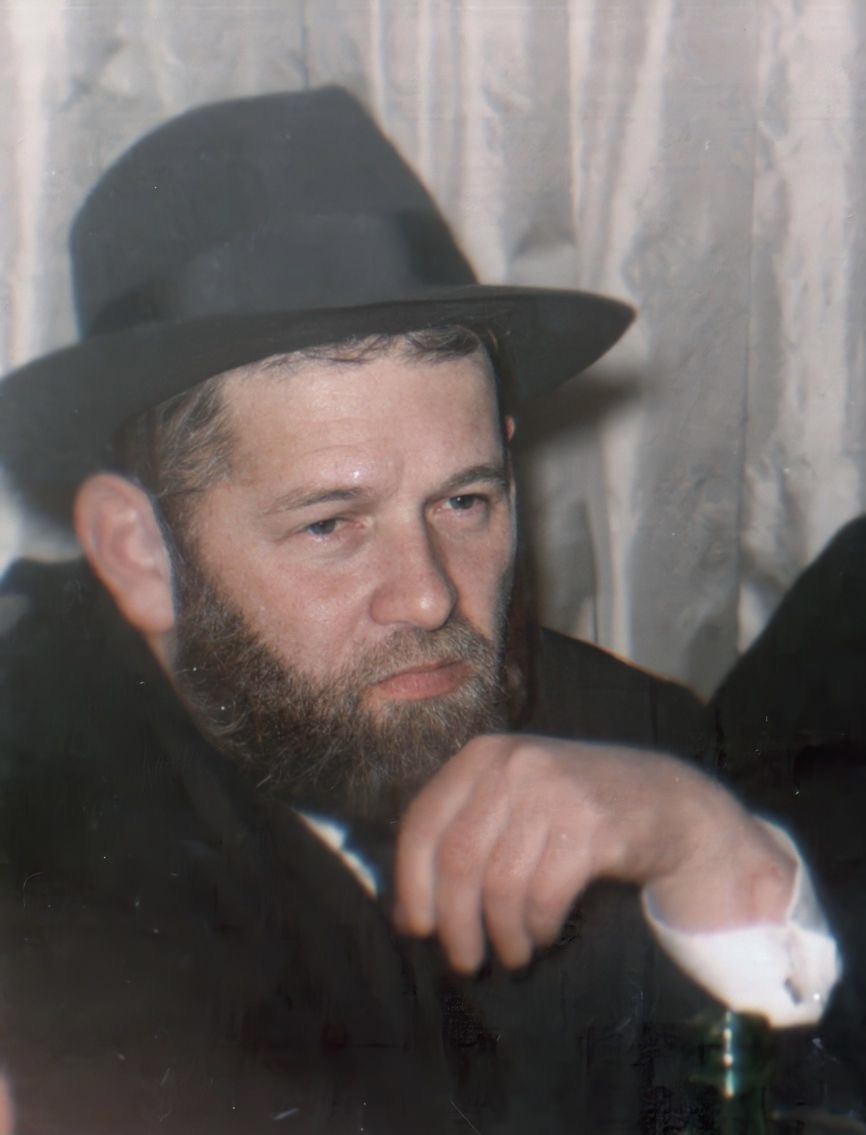
- Aryeh Leib Malin in his last years (early 1960s)

Personal life
- Born: 1906 Mileitzitz, near Białystok, Poland
- Died: 1962 (aged 55–56)
- Spouse: Yaffa Kreiser
- Parent: Avraham Moshe Malin (father)
- Notable work(s): Chidushei Reb Aryeh Leib, HaTevunoh
- Education: Grodno, Telz, Brisk, Mir Yeshiva
- Known for: Founder of Beth Hatalmud Rabbinical College
- Occupation: Rabbi, talmudic scholar, mussarist

Religious life
- Religion: Judaism

Aryeh Leib Malin (1906–1962) was a Polish-born American Haredi Jewish rabbi, Talmudic scholar, and Mussarist who taught the Torah and spread rabbinical education in Europe, China, Japan, and the United States.

== Early life and education ==
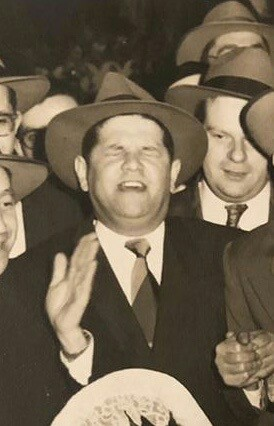
Malin dancing at a wedding (late 1940s)

Aryeh Leib Malin was born in Mileitzitz near Białystok, in Poland. His father, Rabbi Avraham Moshe, served as a dayan (rabbinical court judge) in Mileitzitz. In his early years, Malin learned in Grodno under Rabbi Shimon Shkop. Later he learned under Rabbis Elchonon Wasserman and Baruch Ber Lebowitz. As an older student, he was educated in the Mir Yeshiva of Belarus, where he gained a reputation as a prototype-follower of lomdus (in-depth study) and a model of mussar. In the study of mussar methodology and literature, Malin became a prominent student of Rabbi Yeruchom Levovitz, and he edited the second volume of Rabbi Levovitz's book Daas Chochma U'Mussar. Rabbi Yechiel Michel Feinstein, a son-in-law of Rabbi Yitzchok Zev Soloveitchik, the Brisker Rav, said of Malin that he had an ability to totally immerse himself into whatever Talmudical tractate was being learned in Mir.

At the request of Rabbi Isser Zalman Meltzer, Mir rosh yeshiva Rabbi Eliezer Yehuda Finkel sent a group of his finest scholars to Brisk to hear the Brisker Rav's lectures. Among the group that heard the Rav's shiurim on Kodashim were Malin, Ephraim Mordechai Ginsburg, Yonah Karpilov (Yonas Ilem), and the Brisker Rav's future son-in-law, Yechiel Michel Feinstein. During this period, Malin became especially close to the Brisker Rav, who took a special liking to him. Malin was able to record many of the Brisker Rav's lectures, which were later published in stencil form. He also was given special access to manuscripts of Rabbi Chaim Brisker. Rabbi Berel Povarsky of Ponevezh yeshiva – who edited and published Malin's writings, Chidushei Reb Aryeh Leib – branded his uncle's Torah as "Brisker Torah," meaning that it continues the tradition of Brisk.

In Mir, Malin was part of an elite group of students who served as models of proper behavior and learning. This group was highly respected by the leading posek, Rabbi Chaim Ozer Grodzensky, and was still fondly remembered decades later by Rabbi Chaim Pinchas Scheinberg. In 1940, while the yeshiva was in Soviet-occupied Lithuania, its leaders initially hesitated to seek permission to leave the Soviet Union. Historian Marc B. Shapiro writes that pressure from senior students, including Malin, persuaded the administration to apply for exit permits, a decision that enabled the yeshiva to escape Lithuania.

Afterward, Malin served on a committee of senior students that helped keep the dispersed yeshiva functioning as a single institution. He corresponded with Rabbi Avraham Kalmanowitz about travel arrangements and argued that students who had received Canadian visas should not leave their companions behind. The Mir Yeshiva traveled via Kobe, Japan, to Shanghai, where Malin continued to take on administrative responsibilities.

== In the United States ==
Malin's tomb on Har HaMenuchot in Jerusalem

Malin arrived in San Francisco on July 18, 1946, aboard the General M. C. Meigs with a group of rabbis and yeshiva students from Shanghai. The New York Times identified him as the leader of a 55-member contingent that planned to continue to Toronto. Immediately upon his immigration to America, he rejected proposals from Rabbi Moshe Feinstein to become rosh yeshiva of Mesivtha Tifereth Jerusalem and Rabbi Avraham Kalmanowitz to become the rosh yeshiva of the newly established Brooklyn branch of the Mir yeshiva. Instead, after his 1948 marriage to Yaffa Kreiser, daughter of Rabbi Dovid Ber Kreiser, av beis din of Greiver, Poland and a rosh yeshiva in Kletsk, Malin opted to create a yeshiva and kollel modeled on the Mir of pre-war Europe. He founded the Beth Hatalmud Rabbinical College in Brooklyn, which he regarded as a continuation of Volozhin yeshiva, Slabodka yeshiva, and Mir yeshiva.

Contemporary reports described the new institution as a collective of roughly twenty senior Mir alumni devoted to full-time advanced Talmudic study. It was established with the support of the Union of Orthodox Rabbis, which announced its formation in August 1948. In a 1952 interview, Malin said its purpose was to preserve Torah study as an end in itself, rather than merely train rabbis for professional posts.

As rosh yeshiva of Beis HaTalmud, Malin upheld standards of Torah and mussar that were instructive in themselves. One time, he announced that he would deliver a lecture on a certain sugya and then, on the day of the scheduled lecture, he cancelled it. He explained that he had been unable to see the proper desire on the part of the students to hear the lecture.

Despite being busy with the yeshiva's affairs, Malin would spend hours immersed in Torah study. About nine months before his death, he was injured by a stone thrown at him by a hooligan. On the last day of his life, he was seen in the women's section of the study hall, standing with his hands outstretched, deeply immersed in prayer. A student who saw him, who later became a prominent doctor, concluded that Malin was then suffering a heart attack. Later, Malin collapsed after arriving late to a meeting in the house of Rabbi Shabsai Frankel (who famously re-printed the works of Maimonides). He was 56 years old.

Rabbi Aharon Kotler said at Malin's funeral that the Jewish communities were deprived of a potential leader for the next generation with Malin's death.

== Works and influences ==
Malin's main work, Chidushei Rebbi Aryeh Leib, was published posthumously by his nephew Baruch Dov Povarsky. This work is on the entire scope of Shas, and is used in many present-day yeshivas, especially in matters concerning Kodashim and Nezikin, for which the work is famous. Two of Malin's students were Rabbi Mordechai Elefant and Rabbi Shimshon Dovid Pincus.

He "began publishing the Torah journal HaTevunoh as a vehicle for the Torah writings of the bnei hachaburoh" and also included "several of Reb Yeruchum's shmuessen in each issue."

== Students ==
Rabbis who were his students include

- Haim Benoliel
- Aharon Feldman
- Chaim Ozer Gorelick
- Nosson Kamenetsky
- Shimshon Dovid Pincus
