= Harry Fischel Institute for Talmudic Research =

Harry Fischel Institute for Talmudic Research ("Machon Harry Fischel") is a Jewish theological institute in Jerusalem that specializes in training dayanim (religious court judges). The institute was founded in 1931 by the American philanthropist Harry Fischel, under the impetus of Rabbi Abraham Isaac Kook ("Rav Kook"); see the Hebrew Article re Machon Ariel of which The Harry Fischel Institute is a component. Over the years, the institute has produced many religious court judges.

== Personalities ==
Well known personalities affiliated with Machon Harry Fischel include:

- Saul Lieberman was its longtime dean
- Rabbi Yaakov Hillel, a Sephardic master of kabbalah, who studied at Fischel
