= Etz Chaim Yeshiva (Manhattan) =

Former educational institution in New York City

Coordinates: 40°42′47.6″N 73°59′36.5″W

Etz Chaim Yeshiva was founded in 1886 on the Lower East Side of Manhattan, New York City. The institution was originally established as a cheder-style elementary school. In 1915, it merged with the Rabbi Isaac Elchanan Theological Seminary to form the Rabbinical College of America. After the merger, the elementary grades of Etz Chaim were discontinued, and only the high school remained. This high school eventually became today's Marsha Stern Talmudical Academy. Over time, the Rabbinical College of America evolved into Yeshiva College and later into Yeshiva University.

== History ==
On September 15, 1886 the Chebra Machsika Ishiwas Eitz Chaim was incorporated in the City of New York by a group a laymen and Rabbis. The purpose of the school, as described in the certificate of incorporation, was to instruct Jewish boys in the "Sacred Scriptures, the Talmud, and the Hebrew Language and Literature" as well as providing instruction in "reading, writing, and speaking the English Language." One of the early English teachers was the future journalist Abraham Cahan.

From 1890 until 1897, the Etz Chaim Yeshiva operated in a house at 1 Canal Street. The school moved to 85 Henry Street in 1897, where it remained until 1915.

In 1905, the Etz Chaim Yeshiva had around 175 students, who were divided into six classes. Two studied Chumash (Pentateuch) and the other four studied Talmud. The school day went from 9 am to 6 pm. The periods of 9 am to 12 pm and 1 pm to 4 pm were devoted to Religious Jewish Studies, with secular studies instruction offered from 4 pm to 6 pm.

== See also ==
- History of Yeshiva University
