= Emunah =

Women's Religious Zionist organization

Emunah is a Religious Zionist women's organization that supports Jewish education, family life, and community welfare, both in Israel and internationally. The organization provides programs for women and children, promotes social and educational initiatives, and works to strengthen the values of Religious Zionism. Its roots are in the Mizrachi movement, which established women’s groups in Palestine and around the world in the early 20th century. Sarah Herzog, mother of Chaim Herzog and Yaakov Herzog and grandmother of Isaac Herzog, the current president of Israel, founded Emunah to unite these efforts under a single, global organization.

== History ==
The origins of Emunah trace back to the early 20th century within the Mizrachi movement, a Religious Zionist organization. In 1918, the Mizrachi Women’s Federation was established in Palestine to support education, social welfare, and community engagement among Jewish women. In 1935, a women’s branch of Hapoel HaMizrachi, founded by Tova Sanhadray-Goldreich, was created to promote similar goals, including social programs, education, and volunteer work. These two organizations later merged in 1959 to form the Women’s National Religious Movement, combining their efforts to strengthen Jewish women’s participation in the Religious Zionist community.

The movement adopted the name Emunah in 1977, emphasizing the Hebrew concept of faith (emunah אמונה) as central to its philosophy and activities. The organization also expanded internationally, establishing connections with chapters in the United States and other countries, creating a worldwide network supporting Jewish education, family life, and social welfare.

In the United States, the Women's Mizrachi Federation was founded in 1925, later joining the global Emunah organization in the 1970s. The American branch became active in fundraising, social programs, and publishing, including the monthly Emunah Magazine, which ran until Spring 2016.

Over the years, Emunah has been led by notable figures such as Sarah Herzog, its founder, and chairwomen including Sara Stern-Katan (1984–1990) and Yehudith Huebner (1990–1996), who helped expand the organization’s programs both in Israel and internationally.

== Magazine ==
Emunah Magazine
- Frequency: Monthly
- Final issue: Spring 2016
- Company: Emunah of America
- Country: United States
- Based in: Brooklyn, New York
- Language: English
- OCLC: 38553311

Until 2016, the organization's American branch published Emunah, a monthly Jewish magazine, from Brooklyn, New York. It targeted the Orthodox Jewish community, featuring articles of interest to Jewish families, current issues and national news. The last magazine issue published was Spring 2016.

== Emunah Today ==
Emunah remains an active organization, with chapters across Israel, the United States, Europe, and other countries. Its work focuses on education, social services, and community engagement, especially within the Religious Zionist community.

In Israel, Emunah runs schools and kindergartens, as well as programs for young women and girls. The organization also operates daycare centers and initiatives that support children and families facing difficult circumstances.Volunteers play a central role, helping to run local programs and organize community events. Outside Israel, Emunah chapters provide funding and support for projects in Israel and maintain educational and cultural programs in their home communities. Through its programs, Emunah continues to promote Jewish education, social welfare, and the values of Religious Zionism, while empowering women to take active roles in their communities.
